= The Fortunes of Captain Blood =

1936 British historical adventure novel

- Author: Rafael Sabatini
- Language: English
- Genre: Historical; Adventure
- Publication date: 1936
- Publication place: United Kingdom
- Media type: Print
- Preceded by: Captain Blood Returns

The Fortunes of Captain Blood is a 1936 British historical adventure novel by the Anglo-Italian writer Rafael Sabatini. It is the third in Sabatini's trilogy alongside Captain Blood (1922) and Captain Blood Returns (1931).

The book is comprised of a number of separate adventures:

1. "The Dragon's Jaw"
2. "The Pretender"
3. "The Demonstration"
4. "The Deliverance"
5. "Sacrilege"
6. "The Eloping Hidalga"

== Film adaptation ==
The novel provided a loose inspiration for the 1950 film Fortunes of Captain Blood made by Columbia Pictures and starring Louis Hayward and Patricia Medina.

== Bibliography ==
- Goble, Alan. The Complete Index to Literary Sources in Film. Walter de Gruyter, 1999.
