= John Meredyth Lucas =

American television writer, director and producer

- Born: May 1, 1919; Southern California, U.S.
- Died: October 19, 2002 (aged 83); Los Angeles, U.S.
- Occupations: Television writer, director and producer
- Spouse: Joan Winfield (m. 1951; died 1978)
- Children: 3
- Parents: Wilfred Lucas (father); Bess Meredyth (mother)

John Meredyth Lucas (May 1, 1919 – October 19, 2002) was an American writer, director and producer, primarily for television.

== Career ==
Son of screenwriter Bess Meredyth and writer/director Wilfred Lucas, and the adopted son of director Michael Curtiz, Lucas grew up in Southern California, where he attended a number of schools, including Urban Military Academy, Pacific Military Academy, and Beverly Hills High School. After a failed attempt at college, he began his Hollywood career with a job as an apprentice script clerk at Warner Brothers.

He is best remembered for the work he did on Star Trek: The Original Series as a writer, producer and director. He wrote four of the episodes broadcast from 1967 to 1969: "The Changeling", "Patterns of Force", "Elaan of Troyius", and "That Which Survives". He also directed three of the episodes broadcast in 1968: "The Ultimate Computer", "The Enterprise Incident" and "Elaan of Troyius". The latter was the only episode in the original series to be directed by its writer. Lucas was credited as producer for the latter part of the second season (1967–1968).

He also wrote for Mannix, The Fugitive, The Silent Force, Harry O (David Janssen's 1970s series),The Six Million Dollar Man, and the television adaptations of Planet of the Apes and Logan's Run. Dark City (1950) and Peking Express (1951) were among his feature film writing credits. During 1959–1960 he worked in Australia on the TV series Whiplash, directing numerous episodes of the series (several of which were written by later Star Trek creator Gene Roddenberry).

In 1951 he married Australian born actress Joan Winfield. Together they raised three children. After her death in 1978, he remarried. He died in Los Angeles on 19 October 2002 from leukemia. After his death in 2002, he was cremated and his ashes were later launched into space on a suborbital flight in 2007. They were subsequently launched on an orbital flight on August 2, 2008, however the rocket failed two minutes after launch.

== Star Trek episode credits ==
- 1967 – “Obsession” – (Producer)
- 1967 – "The Changeling" – (writer)
- 1967 – "Journey to Babel" – (producer)
- 1968 – "The Gamesters of Triskelion" – (producer)
- 1968 – "A Piece of the Action" – (producer)
- 1968 – "Patterns of Force" – (writer)
- 1968 – "The Ultimate Computer" – (director)
- 1968 – "The Enterprise Incident" – (director)
- 1968 – "Return to Tomorrow" – (producer)
- 1968 – "Elaan of Troyius" – (writer and director)
- 1969 – "That Which Survives" – (teleplay)

== Filmography ==
=== Films ===
Year	Film	Credit	Notes
1943	The Gorilla Man	Dialogue Director	
1943	Murder on the Waterfront	Dialogue Director	
1943	This Is the Army	Second Assistant Director	Uncredited
1944	The Last Ride	Dialogue Director	
1947	The Unsuspected	Dialogue Director	
1950	Dark City	Screenplay By	Co-wrote screenplay with "Larry Marcus", Based on the story "No Escape" by Larry Marcus
1951	Peking Express	Screenplay By	
1951	Red Mountain	Screenplay By	
1952	Captain Pirate	Screenplay By	Co-wrote screenplay with "Frank Burt" and "Robert Libott", Based on the novel "Captain Blood Returns" by "Rafael Sabatini"
1953	Tumbleweed	Screenplay By	Based on the novel "Three Were Thoroughbreds" by "Kenneth Perkins"
1956	The Scarlet Hour	Screenplay By	Co-wrote screenplay with "Alford Van Ronkel" and "Frank Tashlin", Based on the story "The Kiss Off" by Frank Tashlin
1958	The Sign Of Zorro	Screenplay By	
1960	The Human Vapor	Story By	Uncredited
1961	The Last War	Screenplay By	English Dub (Uncredited)
1962	Gorath	Screenplay By	English Dub
1965	My Blood Runs Cold	Story By	
1971	City Beneath The Sea	Screenplay By	Based on a story by "Irwin Allen"
1974	Inferno in Paradise	Screenplay By	
1980	Farewell to the Planet of the Apes	Directed By	
1984	Yeshua	Written By, Directed By	Documentary, Co-Written and Co-Directed with "Ardon Albright"
1984	3 Days	Directed By	Short
1989	The Magic Boy's Easter	Directed By	Short, Co-Directed with "Marc Daniels"

=== Television ===
Year	TV Series	Credit	Notes
1953	Mr. and Mrs. North	Writer	2 episodes
1954–55	The Loretta Young Show	Writer	3 episodes
1954–55	The Magical World of Disney	Writer	2 episodes
1954–55	Medic	Writer, director	
1955	Stage 7	Writer	1 Episode: "The Legacy"
1955–56	Cavalcade of America	Writer, director	
1955–56	The Ford Television Theatre	Director	6 episodes
1956	Celebrity Playhouse	Director	2 episodes
1956–57	Alfred Hitchcock Presents	Director	3 episodes
1957	Broken Arrow	Writer	1 Episode: "Apache Massacre"
1957	Noah's Ark	Writer	1 Episode: "The Intruder"
1957	Dragnet	Writer	1 Episode: "The Big Blank"
1957	Code 3	Director	1 Episode: "Oil Well Incident"
1957	The George Sanders Mystery Theater	Director	1 Episode: "Love Has No Alibi"
1957	The Court of Last Resort	Director	1 Episode: "The Gordon Wallace Case"
1957	The Thin Man	Director	1 Episode: "Come Back Darling Asta"
1957–58	Zorro	Writer, director	
1958	Flight	Writer	3 episodes
1959	Cimarron City	Writer, director	
1959–61	The Lawless Years	Writer	4 episodes
1960	Pony Express	Writer	2 episodes
1961	Acapulco	Director	1 Episode: "Bell's Half Acre"
1961	Bus Stop	Writer	1 Episode: "The Covering Darkness"
1961	Whiplash	Director, Associate Producer	
1963	Burke's Law	Writer	2 episodes
1963	Laramie	Writer	1 Episode: "The Sometime Gambler"
1964–66	Ben Casey	Writer, director, producer	
1965–80	Insight	Writer, director, producer, Script Consultant	Multiple Episodes
1966–67	The Fugitive	Writer, director, Co-Producer	
1967	The Invaders	Director	1 Episode: "The Betrayed"
1967–69	Star Trek: The Original Series	Writer, director, producer	
1967–74	Mannix	Writer, director	
1970	The Silent Force	Writer	1 Episode: "Take As Directed For Death"
1970–72	Night Gallery	Director	4 episodes
1971	Medical Center	Writer	2 episodes
1971–75	Police Surgeon	Director	Multiple Episodes
1973	The Starlost	Writer	1 Episode: "The Implant People"(Uncredited)
1974	Planet of the Apes	Director	1 Episode: "Up Above the World So High"
1975	Swiss Family Robinson	Writer	2 episodes
1975–76	Harry O	Writer	5 episodes
1976–78	The Six Million Dollar Man	Writer, director	
1977	Kojak	Writer	1 Episode: "Tears for All Who Love Her"
1977	Logan's Run	Writer	1 Episode: "The Judas Goat"
1977	Rafferty	Writer	2 episodes
1978	Fantasy Island	Writer	1 Episode
1980	Beyond Westworld	Producer	5 episodes
1980	This Is The Life	Director	1 Episode: "Independence and '76"
1981	Nero Wolfe	Writer	1 Episode: "To Catch a Dead Man"
