= The Enterprise Incident =

- Star Trek: The Original Series episode
- Episode no.: Season 3 Episode 2
- Directed by: John Meredyth Lucas
- Written by: D. C. Fontana
- Cinematography by: Gerald Finnerman
- Production code: 059
- Original air date: September 27, 1968

Guest appearances
- Joanne Linville – Romulan Commander; Jack Donner – Sub-Commander Tal; Richard Compton – Technical Officer; Robert Gentile – Technician; Mike Howden – Romulan Guard; Gordon Coffey – Romulan Soldier; Eddie Paskey – Lt. Leslie; Roger Holloway – Lt. Lemli

Episode chronology
← Previous "Spock's Brain"	Next → "The Paradise Syndrome"
- Star Trek: The Original Series season 3

"The Enterprise Incident" is the second episode of the third season of the American science fiction television series Star Trek. Written by D. C. Fontana and directed by John Meredyth Lucas, it was first broadcast September 27, 1968.

The episode revolves around the crew of the Enterprise on a secret mission to steal a Romulan cloaking device.

== Plot ==
Captain Kirk orders Enterprise into Romulan space, seemingly without authorization from Starfleet. Romulan vessels intercept the Enterprise and Kirk negotiates an hour's time to consider surrendering his ship. Kirk and his Vulcan first officer, Spock, are then invited aboard the Romulan flagship.

Once aboard the Romulan ship, Kirk and Spock are taken before the female commander, who demands an explanation for their intrusion into Romulan space. Kirk claims that instrument failure caused the ship to stray off course, but Spock divulges that the captain ordered entry into Romulan space and asserts that he is insane. Romulan guards lead Kirk to their brig.

Alone with Spock in her quarters, the commander questions Spock about his career. She argues that humans may have shown their disregard for his talents and capabilities by not giving him command of a ship, but the Romulans, if he were willing, would not make that mistake.

In the Romulan brig, Kirk injures himself by lunging against the force field door. Chief Medical Officer Dr. McCoy is summoned from the Enterprise to attend to him. The commander asks McCoy to confirm Spock's characterization of the captain as mentally incompetent and McCoy does so, whereupon the commander calls on Spock to assume command of the Enterprise. Kirk, calling Spock a traitor, attacks him, and Spock defends himself using what he calls the "Vulcan death grip". Kirk slumps to the floor, and McCoy declares him dead.

Back on the Enterprise, Kirk awakens from the state of suspension brought on by the so-called death grip. His apparent insanity, the unauthorized venture into Romulan space, and Spock's betrayal have all been part of a secret Federation plan to steal a Romulan cloaking device. Kirk orders McCoy to perform surgery to give him Romulan features and then transports back to the Romulan vessel disguised as one of their officers.

Meanwhile, Spock and the commander dine in her quarters, and their conversation grows intimate. When the commander goes to change her attire, Spock directs Kirk, via communicator, to the location of the cloaking device. His signal is discovered and tracked, and Spock surrenders himself to the Romulan officers, but they are too late to prevent Kirk from stealing the cloaking device and returning with it to the Enterprise.

Chief Engineer Scott attempts to adapt the Romulan cloaking device to the Enterprise while Ensign Chekov succeeds in distinguishing Spock's life signs from those of the Romulans. Both Spock and the Romulan commander are beamed to the Enterprise where Kirk gives the order to return to Federation space. The pursuing Romulans are ready to fire upon them as Scott successfully activates the cloak and the Enterprise vanishes before their eyes.

With the danger averted, Kirk directs Spock to return the Romulan commander to her quarters until she can be delivered to a Federation outpost. In the turbolift, the commander points out to Spock that any advantage the Federation gains from studying the new cloaking device model will be temporary, as before long the Romulans will learn to circumvent it. Drawing a counterpoint between that observation and their earlier encounter aboard the Romulan ship, Spock notes that military secrets are the most fleeting of all while expressing hope that the intimacy of that encounter involved something more permanent.

== Production ==
=== Writing ===
D. C. Fontana based this story very loosely upon the Pueblo incident, in which a United States Navy ship and its crew were seized, and the crew held on charges of espionage for almost a year, after the ship allegedly strayed into North Korean waters.

The first draft of the script had Spock "raining kisses on every square inch above the shoulder" of the Romulan commander but this was changed, at Leonard Nimoy's insistence, to the more demure finger caresses. Fontana has pointed out that the "raining kisses" scene was actually an embellishment by Gene Roddenberry—one of the few he applied to third season scripts—and that the original script submitted had only an embrace and kiss, with most of the passion being delivered by the Romulan commander.

Originally, both Kirk and McCoy were disguised as Romulans and went aboard the Romulan ship to steal the cloaking device. This was dropped not only due to cost concerns, but because Robert H. Justman pointed out that having McCoy doing plastic surgery on his own ears would have stretched believability, and including a character to perform the surgery on both Kirk and McCoy would have required casting an additional role, further increasing the cost.

=== Models ===
In the original broadcast episode all three Romulan ships were actually Klingon D7 battlecruisers. Although in production order the model was first used (as a Klingon ship) in "Elaan of Troyius", in broadcast order it is first seen in this episode. Spock explains away the dual use at the start of the episode with the line "intelligence reports Romulans now using Klingon design."

In the remastered edition two of the three Romulan warships remain the D7, with the third being changed into the Romulan Bird-of-Prey as first seen in the episode "Balance of Terror". There is some historical dispute as to the reason the D7's were used for the original episode rather than the already established Bird-of-Prey. It does appear that the original model for the Bird-of-Prey had disappeared, and some believe that they chose the D7 to use an already existing model. However others believe the use of the D7 may have been a courtesy directed to Aluminum Model Toys, the model company that paid for the new D7 model.

== Non-canonical media ==
Several references to the episode appear outside of Star Trek canon.

- The name of the Romulan commander and her fate are not revealed in the episode. At least two different explanations are given in Trek novels—The Price of the Phoenix and Vulcan's Heart. (In the early days of Trek writing, many novels contradicted each other, so the commander has had a number of names and fates.) The latest explanation is given in the novel Vulcan's Heart, by Josepha Sherman and Susan Shwartz, which gives her name as Liviana Charvanek. Apparently, sometime after the events of this episode, Charvanek was returned to Romulus and resumed her military career.
- D. C. Fontana co-wrote a sequel: Star Trek: Year Four—The Enterprise Experiment, a graphic novel published by IDW Publishing in 2008.
- This episode is referenced in the video game Star Trek: Tactical Assault. During a Federation mission the player's ship is equipped with the Romulan cloaking device stolen by Kirk and ordered to launch a sneak attack on a Klingon starbase.
- The Romulan commander and Subcommander Tal are central characters in the two-part series conclusion to Star Trek Continues. The part of the Romulan commander was played by Amy Rydell, daughter of Joanne Linville, who played the role in the original episode.
- The Romulan commander appears in the independently produced science fiction audio drama Starship Excelsior season 4 episode "Tomorrow's Excelsior". In the episode it is revealed that the commander has received a promotion to Legate. The character was voiced by Joanne Linville, who played the role in the original TOS episode.

== Reception ==
In 2014, Gizmodo ranked "The Enterprise Incident" as the 48th best episode of Star Trek, out of the over 700 made by that time (including the spin-off series).

In 2016, The Hollywood Reporter rated "The Enterprise Incident" the 33rd best television episode of all Star Trek franchise television prior to Star Trek: Discovery, including live-action and the animated series but not counting the movies. They note that this episode is the favorite of the director of the 2016 film Star Trek: Beyond, Justin Lin.

In 2016, Newsweek ranked "The Enterprise Incident" as one of the best episodes of the original series. They note Spock's interaction with the Romulan commander, and the Federation's desire for a science fiction technology, Star Trek's "cloaking device".

In 2017, Comic Book Resources ranked Spock and the Romulan commander the 11th best romantic relationship of the Star Trek franchise up to that time. In 2017, CBR ranked the Romulan commander the 7th "fiercest" female character of the Star Trek universe.

In 2020, SyFy recommended watching this episode for background on Romulans for Star Trek: Picard.

In 2020, ScreenRant ranked it as the 4th best episode of TOS to re-watch. They note the similarity in the plot between this episode and season one of Star Trek: Discovery, although instead of the Romulans, the Klingons are shown.

== Releases ==
This episode was released in Japan on December 21, 1993 as part of the complete season 3 LaserDisc set, Star Trek: Original Series log.3. A trailer for this and the other episodes was also included, and the episode had English and Japanese audio tracks. The cover script was スター・トレック TVサードシーズン

The episode was released on VHS in the United Kingdom, paired with "And the Children Shall Lead".

This episode was included in the TOS Season 3 remastered DVD box set, with the remastered version of this episode.
