= Captain Blood (novel) =

1922 novel by Rafael Sabatini

Captain Blood: His Odyssey
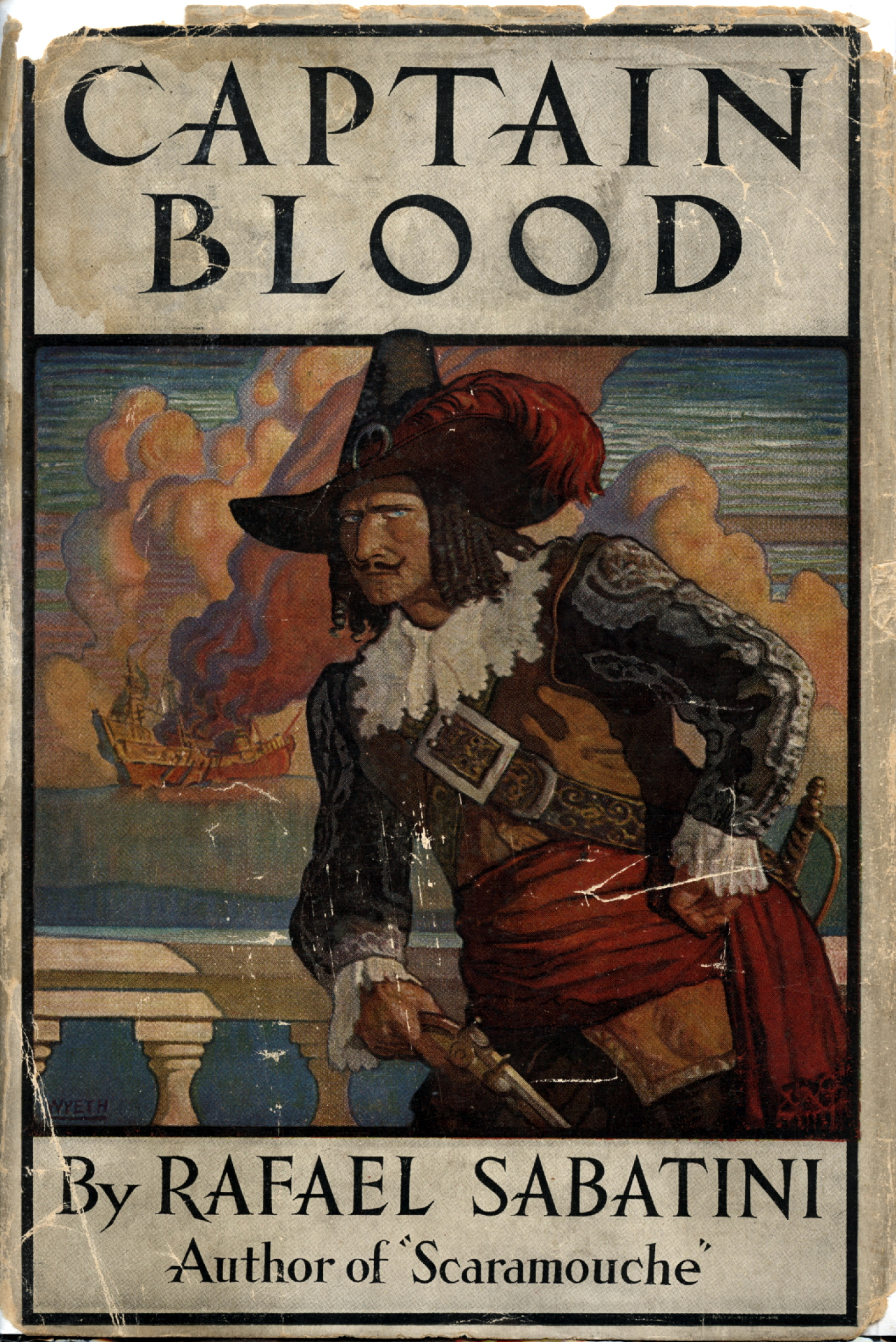
- 1922 dust jacket cover
- Author: Rafael Sabatini
- Language: English
- Subject: Piracy, justice
- Publisher: Houghton Mifflin Company
- Publication date: 1922
- Publication place: England
- Text: Captain Blood: His Odyssey at Wikisource

Captain Blood: His Odyssey is an adventure novel by Rafael Sabatini, originally a series of short stories in Premier Magazine in 1920–1, collected in book form in 1922.

In 1935, it was adapted as a movie starring Errol Flynn.

== Development ==
Sabatini was a proponent of basing historical fiction as closely as possible on history. Although Blood is a fictional character, much of the historical background of the novel is loosely based on fact. A group of Monmouth rebels was indeed condemned to ten years' hard labour in Barbados, very similar to chattel slavery; and the shifting political alliances of the Glorious Revolution of 1688 are used in the novel as a plot device to allow Blood's return to respectability.

Sabatini based the first part of the story of Blood on Henry Pitman, a surgeon who tended the wounded Monmouth rebels and was sentenced to death by Judge George Jeffreys, but whose sentence was commuted to penal transportation to Barbados where he escaped and was captured by pirates. Unlike the fictional Blood, Pitman did not join them, and eventually made his way back to England where he wrote a popular account of his ordeal. For Blood's life as a buccaneer, Sabatini used several models, including Henry Morgan and the work of Alexandre Exquemelin, for historical details.

Sabatini first introduced the character Captain Blood in a series of eight short stories in Premier Magazine as Tales of the Brethren of the Main, published from December 1920 to March 1921, and reprinted in Adventure Magazine from January to May 1921, with a novella "Captain Blood's Dilemma", published in Premier Magazine in April 1921 (and Adventure Magazine in October 1921). (Note: The Tales of the Brethren of the Main were: 1. "The Rebels Convicts" (Premier Magazine title) / "Rebels Convict" (Adventure Magazine title); 2. "Don Diego Valdez"; 3. "The Governor's Daughter" (Premier Magazine title) / "The Prize" (Adventure Magazine title); 4. "Maracaybo"; 5. "Blood-Money"; 6. "Santa Maria"; 7. "Lord Julian's Mission"; 8. "Hostage" (Premier Magazine title) / "The Hostage" (Adventure Magazine title); "Governor Blood" (Premier Magazine title) / "Captain Blood's Dilemma" (Adventure Magazine title)) The Odyssey-like story arc of these tales was then woven by Sabatini into a continuous narrative in novel form, published as Captain Blood: His Odyssey in 1922.

== Synopsis ==
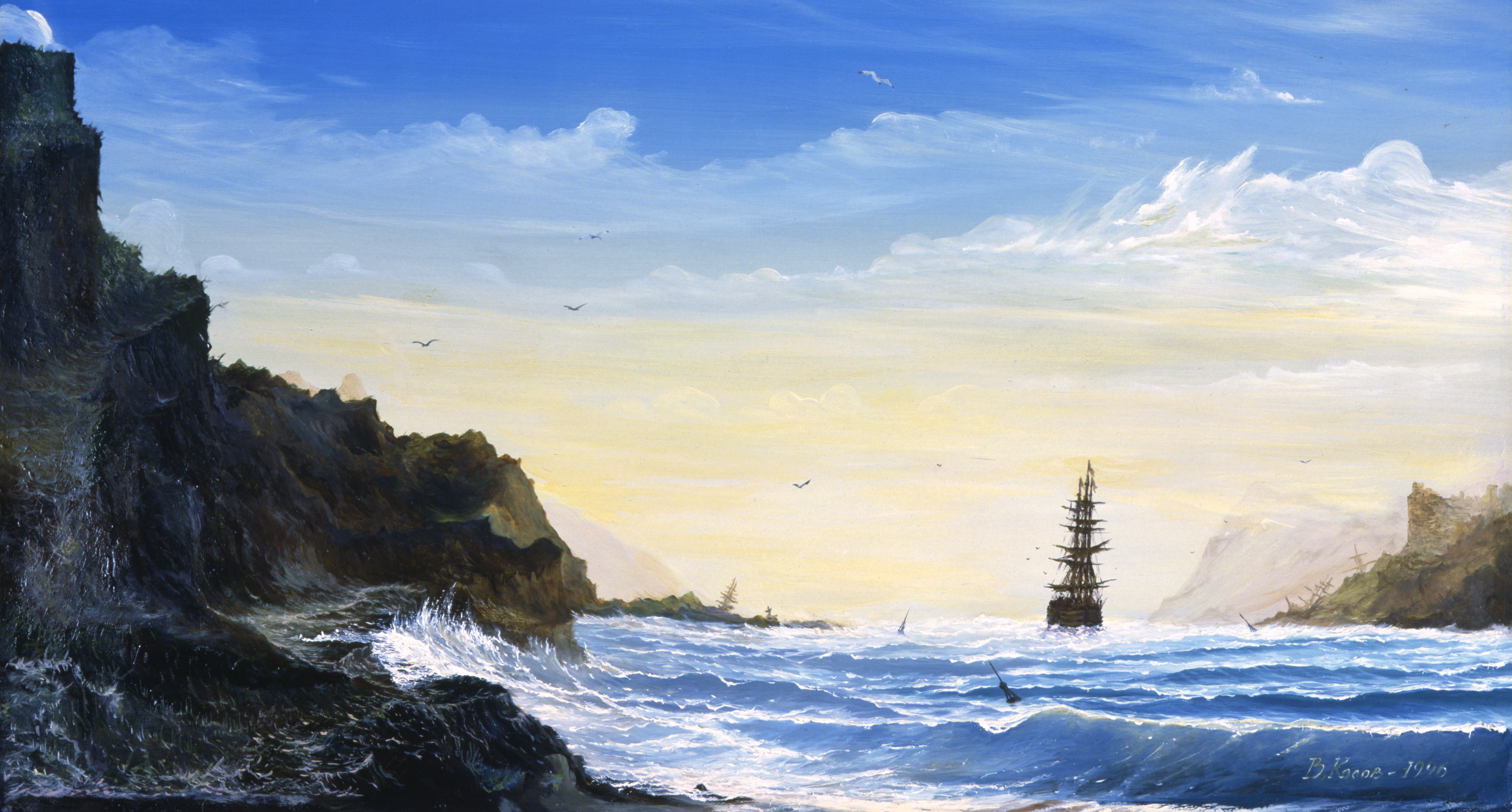
The Odyssey of Captain Blood (1996) by Vladimir Kosov, a fragment of the picture for the novel

The protagonist is the sharp-witted Dr. Peter Blood, a fictional Irish physician who had had a wide-ranging career as a soldier and sailor (including a commission as a captain under the Dutch admiral Michiel de Ruyter) before settling down to practice medicine in the town of Bridgwater, Somerset. The story is told from the perspective of an omniscient narrator, who enables the reader to see the thoughts and views of many different characters. The narrator—perhaps meant to be Sabatini himself—claims to have acquired the story from the ship's logs of Blood's longtime companion Jeremy Pitt.

The book opens with Blood attending to his geraniums while the town prepares to fight for James Scott, 1st Duke of Monmouth. He wants no part in the Monmouth Rebellion, but after being urgently summoned to attend to one of the rebels wounded at the Battle of Sedgemoor, Peter is arrested. During the Bloody Assizes, he is convicted by the infamous Judge Jeffreys of treason on the grounds that "if any person be in actual rebellion against the King, and another person—who really and actually was not in rebellion—does knowingly receive, harbour, comfort, or succour him, such a person is as much a traitor as he who indeed bore arms."

The sentence for treason is death by hanging, but King James II, for purely financial reasons, has the sentence for Blood and other convicted rebels commuted to transportation to slavery in the Caribbean. Upon arrival on the island of Barbados, Blood is bought by Colonel William Bishop, initially for forced work in the Colonel's prison farms but later hired out by Bishop when Blood's skills as a physician prove superior to those of the local doctors. During his period of servitude, Blood wins the pity and sympathy of Arabella, Colonel Bishop's niece.

When a Spanish force attacks and raids Bridgetown, Blood escapes with a number of other convicts (including former shipmaster Jeremy Pitt, the one-eyed giant Edward Wolverstone, former gentleman Nathaniel Hagthorpe and two Royal Navy veterans, former petty officer Nicholas Dyke and former master gunner Ned Ogle). The escapees capture the Spaniards' ship, turn its guns on the returning Spaniards and sail away to become some of the most successful buccaneers in the Caribbean, hated and feared by the Spanish but always sparing English ships. Colonel Bishop, humiliated by Blood's daring escape and growing fame as a buccaneer, devotes himself to capturing and executing Blood.

After many adventures and the Glorious Revolution, Blood and his remaining fellow rebel-convicts are pardoned. As a reward for saving the colony of Jamaica from a French assault, he is appointed its governor in place of Colonel Bishop, who had abandoned his post to hunt for Blood, and the novel ends with the implication that Blood will not only marry Arabella but will also generously forgive Bishop.

== Influence ==
=== Continuation ===
Captain Blood won enormous popularity, but instead of continuing Blood's adventures in sequels, Sabatini wrote fifteen more short stories set during Captain Blood's pirate career. Three of these tales ("The Blank Shot", "The War Indemnity" and "Blood Money") may be viewed as continuations of events of the original novel, but all the stories are contained within the timeframe of Captain Blood (a sidequel). (Note: Despite this, Sabatini set one story ("The King's Messenger" from Captain Blood Returns) in May 1690, even though he had earlier established Blood's piratical career as having ended in 1689.)

Eight of these new stories were published in 1931 as Captain Blood Returns (retitled The Chronicles of Captain Blood in the British publication) along with two of the Tales of the Brethren of the Main that had not been incorporated into Captain Blood. A second collection, The Fortunes of Captain Blood, consisting of six new stories was published in 1936, and one final story, "The Remedy", which takes place almost immediately after Blood's trial before Judge Jeffreys and in which Peter Blood is not the primary character but is prominently figured, was included in Sabatini's collection of short stories Turbulent Tales, published in 1946.

The book was especially popular in Russia. Several Russian authors wrote moderately popular sequels, such as Children of Captain Blood by Tatyana Vinogradova, and Captain Blood: His Iliad by Mikhail Popov.

A sequel novel by Thomas Daniels, Captain Blood Returns to England: End of an Odyssey (ISBN 979-8840571620), was published in 2022, detailing Blood's adventures after returning to England after a lull in the war with France.

=== Literary references ===
The bitter aftermath of the Monmouth Rebellion also features prominently in Arthur Conan Doyle's novel Micah Clarke (1889).

In the opening chapter of Arturo Pérez-Reverte's novel The Club Dumas (1993), two characters discuss their favourite novel by Sabatini; book dealer Lucas Corso declares his preference for Captain Blood.

Alan Moore's comic book series The League of Extraordinary Gentlemen incorporates many characters from classic books, including Peter Blood as a member of the Pirates' Conference in The New Traveller's Almanac (2002–2003).

=== Adaptations ===
==== Film ====
- Captain Blood (1924), starring J. Warren Kerrigan
- Captain Blood (1935), starring Errol Flynn
- Fortunes of Captain Blood (1950), starring Louis Hayward
- Captain Pirate (1952), aka Captain Blood, Fugitive (UK), starring Louis Hayward
- The Son of Captain Blood (1962), starring Sean Flynn (Errol Flynn's son)
- L'odyssée du capitaine Blood (1991), starring Yves Lambrecht: a Franco-Russian co-production which had a 1991 theatrical release in the USSR (as Одиссея капитана Блада) and was a March 1992 two-episode broadcast by France 3

==== Audio ====
- Captain Blood. Full Cast Audio production (2006) The Colonial Radio Theatre on the Air. Released by Blackstone Audio.

==== Comics ====
- Captain Blood, adapted in Fast Fiction #2, 1949, reprinted in Stories by Famous Authors Illustrated #2, 1950.
- Captain Blood: The Legacy, a five-issue sepia-toned comic adaptation of the novel by Matt Shepherd and Mike Shoyket (2009, SLG Comics)

==== Video games ====
- Age of Pirates 2: City of Abandoned Ships (2009)
- Captain Blood (2025)
