= Jane Stanton Hitchcock =

American screenwriter (1946–2025)

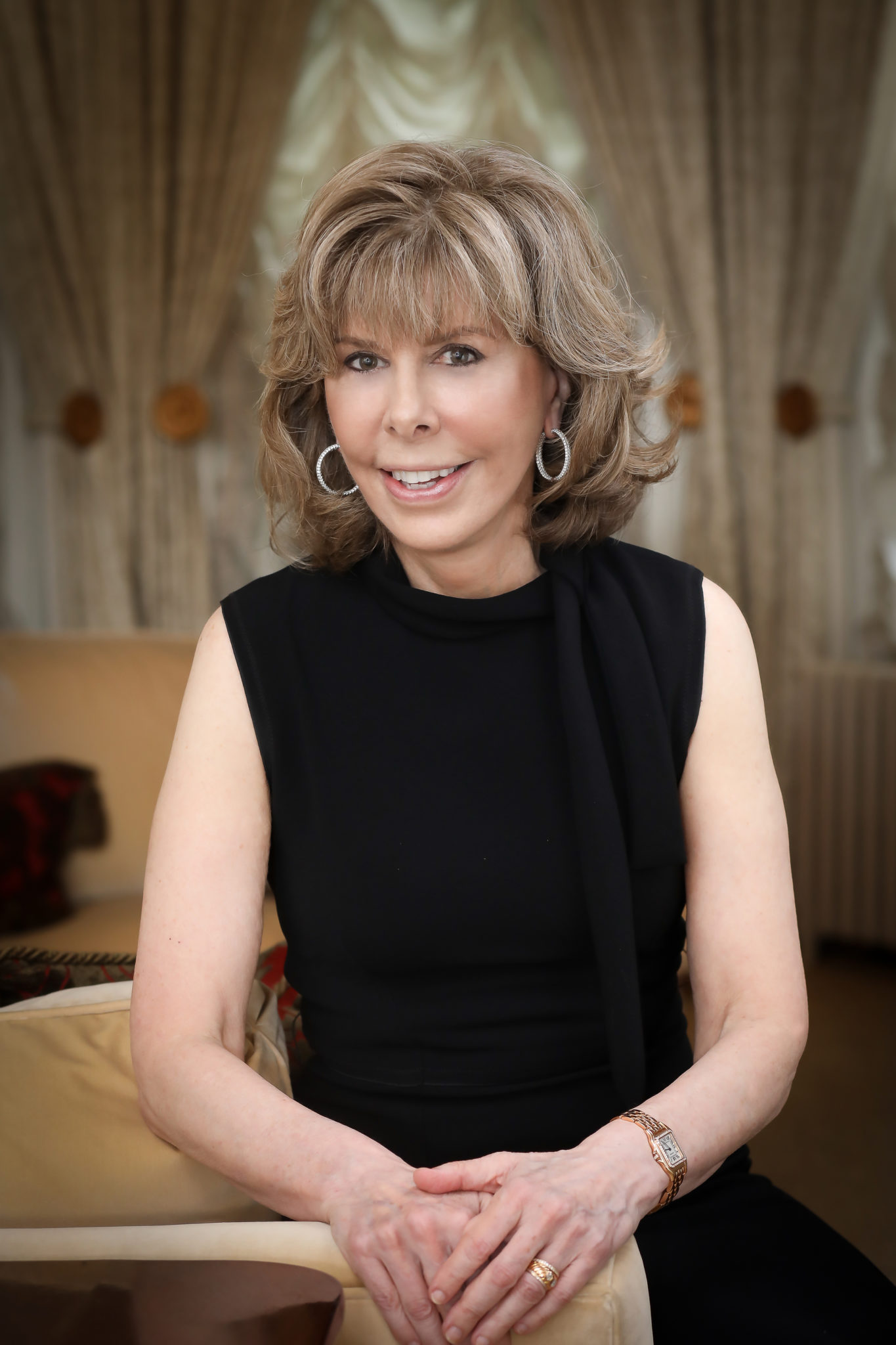
- Hitchcock in 2018
- Born: Jane Johnston Crowley; November 24, 1946; New York City, U.S.
- Died: June 23, 2025 (aged 78); Washington, D.C., U.S.
- Other name: Jane Crowley Stanton
- Education: Sarah Lawrence College
- Occupations: Author; Playwright; Screenwriter
- Spouse(s): William Mellon Hitchcock (m. 1975; div. 1991) Jim Hoagland (m. 1995; died 2024)
- Website: janestantonhitchcock.com

Jane Stanton Hitchcock (November 24, 1946 – June 23, 2025) was an American author, playwright and screenwriter. She wrote several plays but is known mostly for her mystery novels Trick of the Eye, The Witches' Hammer, Social Crimes, One Dangerous Lady, Mortal Friends, and Bluff, which was the winner of the 2019 Hammett Prize. Hitchcock also wrote the screenplays for Our Time and First Love.

== Early life ==
Hitchcock was born Jane Johnston Crowley on November 24, 1946, in Manhattan, New York City, to Robert Crowley, a surgeon, and Joan Crowley (known professionally as Joan Alexander), an actress known for playing Lois Lane on the radio serial The Adventures of Superman, and Della Street on the radio serial Perry Mason. Joan divorced Crowley and married Arthur Stanton, who adopted Jane when she was nine years old; at which time, Jane came to be known as Jane Crowley Stanton.

She attended The Brearley School, The Mary C. Wheeler School, and Sarah Lawrence College, graduating in 1968. In 1975, she married William Mellon Hitchcock, adopting his last name, by which she would hitherto be known as Jane Stanton Hitchcock.

== Career ==
=== Film and theatre ===
Hitchcock wrote a screenplay (under the name Jane C. Stanton) for the 1974 film Our Time, directed by Peter Hyams. The film was set in 1955 at an all-girls boarding school in Massachusetts and dealt with the issue of abortion in a privileged setting. In 1977, Paramount released First Love, a film written by Hitchcock who shared credit with David Freeman, and was directed by Joan Darling.

In 1981, The American Place Theatre produced Hitchcock's play Grace under the direction of Peter Thompson. The Off-Broadway play was Hitchcock's "first professional New York City production." In 1983, another play by Hitchcock, a farce entitled Bhutan, was staged at the South Street Theater in Manhattan.

Hitchcock's theatrical adaptation titled The Custom of the Country, based on Edith Wharton's novel by the same name, was staged by Shakespeare & Company at The Mount, Wharton's former home in Lenox, Massachusetts. In September 1985, the play was staged by the Second Stage Theatre under the direction of Daniel Gerroll.

In 1990, Hitchcock's Vanilla, a play directed by Harold Pinter, was staged at London's Lyric Theatre.

=== Novels ===
Vowing not to rely on the "aid of actors and a director," Hitchcock changed mediums from plays to novels. In 1992, she published her first novel, Trick of the Eye, which was received with what William Norwich, of The New York Times, described as positive reviews. In 1992, the book was nominated in the "Best First Novel" category for the Hammett Prize, as well as the Edgar Award. The murder mystery novel is narrated from the point of view of the protagonist Faith Crowell, an artist "who specializes in trompe l'oeil art" and is employed as a decorator to the rich. Crowell is hired to redecorate a ballroom originally designed for the coming-out party of her patron's daughter, who was murdered a few years after the debutante ball. The book was adapted into a television film aired by CBS on October 23, 1994.

Hitchcock published The Witches' Hammer in 1994. Her third novel Social Crimes was released in 2002. Social Crimes was the first of a two-book series introducing Jo Slater, a New York socialite who commits murder. According to Norwich, many readers of the same social circle, of which Hitchcock was also a member, had delighted in speculating that the character was in fact based on them. In The New York Times Book Review about Social Crimes, Sarah Haight remarked that "Hitchcock depicts the glamour and fickleness of the Slaters' upper-crust life with the witty weariness of a seasoned observer."

In June 2005, Hitchcock published the sequel to Social Crimes which was titled One Dangerous Lady. The author and journalist Dominick Dunne, a friend of Hitchcock's who received an early copy, wrote in the April 2005 issue of Vanity Fair that he was amused by the resemblance he himself bears to the description of the murder victim in the novel, who is "bludgeoned to death."

At the end of June 2009, Hitchcock published Mortal Friends, a novel set in Washington D.C. As part of the promotions for the book, she was interviewed by Bob Schieffer on the CBS News show Washington Unplugged. Joanne Kaufman in The Wall Street Journal describes Mortal Friends as a "briskly entertaining".

In 2017, Hitchcock announced that she was working on her sixth novel, Bluff, which was connected to her then newly found passion for poker. She was an avid poker player and competed in the World Poker Tour and the World Series of Poker. Bluff was released by Poisoned Pen in April 2019. The novel was the winner of the 2019 Hammett Prize, awarded by the International Association of Crime Writers.

== Personal life and death ==
In 1991, Hitchcock divorced William Mellon Hitchcock. She married Jim Hoagland in 1995. Hoagland was a two-time Pulitzer Prize-winning journalist. He was also a columnist and contributing editor at The Washington Post. They lived in Washington, D.C. Hitchcock was a close friend of Jacqueline Kennedy Onassis and read Psalm 23 at the former First Lady's funeral in 1994.

At the time of his death in 1987, Hitchcock's step-father, Arthur Stanton, had left his wife and Hitchcock's mother Joan Alexander Stanton, an inheritance estimated at about $70–80 million. The estate was to be overseen by Kenneth Ira Starr who the Stantons had met through their daughter. Starr, on Joan Stanton's behalf, eventually began making investments in a number of questionable ventures in which he had a personal vested interest, many of which resulted in a loss. Sometime after 2006, Hitchcock and her mother became suspicious of Starr's dealings. A family friend, Jim Fennell, had discovered a scheme to use their East Hampton home as collateral to obtain a $5 million line of credit under the premise that the funds would be used to make more investments. Instead, Starr had been using Stanton's money to fund his lavish lifestyle. When Hitchcock learned of this, she convinced her mother to seek legal assistance and brought the case to the attention of the New York County District Attorney. Her mother sued Starr in April 2008 but she died in May 2009. Hitchcock settled the lawsuit under undisclosed terms but continued to assist in the ensuing criminal investigation. Starr was charged in criminal court for defrauding several celebrity figures. He pleaded guilty in September 2010 and he was sentenced to seven and half years in federal prison in March 2011. In January 2012, the fraud case was featured in an episode in the sixth season of American Greed which included interviews with Hitchcock detailing how she pursued Starr until his conviction was secured.

Hitchcock died of pancreatic cancer at her home in Washington, D.C., on June 23, 2025, at the age of 78. She is survived by Hoagland's two children, Lily and Lee.

== Published works ==
=== Films ===
- Our Time (1974), screenplay by Hitchcock and directed by Peter Hyams
- First Love (1977), screenplay by Hitchcock and David Freeman
- Trick of the Eye (1994) based on a novel by Hitchcock

=== Plays ===
- Grace. Samuel French, Inc. 1982. ISBN 9780573609817.
- The Custom of the Country. Applause. 1997. ISBN 9781557832870.

=== Novels ===
- Trick of the Eye. Signet. 1992. ISBN 9780451176738.
- The Witches' Hammer. Dutton. 1994. ISBN 9780525936411.
- Social Crimes. Allen & Unwin. 2002. ISBN 9781741148183.
- One Dangerous Lady. Miamax. 2005. ISBN 9781401352363.
- Mortal Friends: A Novel. Harper Collins. 2009. ISBN 9780061940514.
- Bluff. Poisoned Pen. 2019. ISBN 9781464210693.
