= Captain Blood Returns =

1931 novel

- First US edition
- Author: Rafael Sabatini
- Language: English
- Genre: Historical; Adventure
- Publisher: Houghton Mifflin (US)
- Publication date: 1931
- Publication place: United Kingdom
- Media type: Print
- Preceded by: Captain Blood, His Odyssey
- Followed by: The Fortunes of Captain Blood

Captain Blood Returns (also published under the title The Chronicles of Captain Blood) is a 1931 British historical adventure novel by the Anglo-Italian writer Rafael Sabatini. It is the second in Sabatini's trilogy about the character after Captain Blood (1922) and was followed by The Fortunes of Captain Blood (1936).

The book is comprised of a number of separate adventures:

1. "The Blank Shot" (which takes place shortly after Peter Blood's escape from slavery in Barbados)
2. "The Treasure Ship" (a direct sequel to "The Blank Shot")
3. "The King's Messenger"
4. "The War Indemnity" (a follow-up to Chapter 19, "The Meeting", of the original Captain Blood novel)
5. "Blood Money" (a follow-up to Chapter 17, "The Dupes", of the original Captain Blood novel)
6. "The Gold at Santa Maria"
7. "The Love Story of Jeremy Pitt"
8. "The Expiation of Madame de Coulevain"
9. "The Gratitude of Monsieur de Coulevain" (a direct sequel to the previous story)
10. "Gallow's Key" (a sequel to "The Treasure Ship")

== Film adaptation ==
The novel provided a loose inspiration for the 1952 film Captain Pirate made by Columbia Pictures and starring Louis Hayward and Patricia Medina. This was made as a sequel to the 1950 film Fortunes of Captain Blood.

== Bibliography ==
- Goble, Alan. The Complete Index to Literary Sources in Film. Walter de Gruyter, 1999.
