= Dark City (1950 film) =

1950 film by William Dieterle

- Theatrical release poster
- Directed by: William Dieterle
- Screenplay by: John Meredyth Lucas; Larry Marcus; Ketti Frings
- Based on: "No Escape" by Larry Marcus
- Produced by: Hal B. Wallis
- Starring: Charlton Heston; Lizabeth Scott; Viveca Lindfors; Dean Jagger; Don DeFore
- Cinematography: Victor Milner
- Edited by: Warren Low
- Music by: Franz Waxman
- Production company: Hal Wallis Productions
- Distributed by: Paramount Pictures
- Release dates: October 18, 1950 (New York); February 4, 1951 (Los Angeles)
- Running time: 98 minutes
- Country: United States
- Language: English

Dark City is a 1950 American film noir crime film starring Charlton Heston, Lizabeth Scott, Viveca Lindfors, Dean Jagger, Don DeFore, Ed Begley, Jack Webb and Harry Morgan. It was produced by Hal B. Wallis and directed by William Dieterle.

This was Heston's first appearance in a professional film production, following his participation in David Bradley's amateur Peer Gynt (1941) and the educational, Chicago-based Julius Caesar (1950). In later interviews, Heston called Dark City "definitely not an 'A' picture, but a pretty good 'B'". Webb and Morgan later costarred in the police drama television series Dragnet.

== Plot ==
Danny Haley owns an illegal gambling location that the police raid even though he pays them for protection. Danny loves singer Fran Garlan but tells her that he cannot commit to a relationship. He meets businessman Arthur Winant, who is in town to buy equipment for a sports club. When Danny notices a check for $5,000 in Winant's wallet, he invites him to play poker at his closed establishment with Danny's pals Soldier, Barney and Augie. During the game, Winant talks about his older brother Sidney, who is coming to meet him the next evening. Barney and Augie let Arthur win $325, but the next evening, they cheat Arthur out of all his money and the $5,000, which is not his.

The next day, Danny learns that Winant has committed suicide. Fearing police attention, Danny tells his friends to wait a few days before cashing Winant's check. Barney, the most nervous of the group, thinks that someone is following him, and the next morning, he is found dead.

Police captain Garvey interviews Danny and Augie and tells them that he knows that there is a connection between Winant's death and the poker game and that Winant left a letter for his brother Sidney. He informs them that Sidney is a dangerous criminal and likely to avenge his brother's death, and that Barney was probably killed by Sidney. Danny and Augie deny any connection with Winant's death.

Danny and Augie try to find Sidney before he finds them. In Los Angeles, Danny poses as an insurance agent and visits Winant's widow Victoria, telling her that he needs to locate Sidney, the beneficiary of Winant's life-insurance policy, and that Victoria will be the beneficiary if Sidney is not found. Victoria cannot provide a photo of Sidney because she has destroyed them. Danny spends a romantic evening with Victoria, but when he reveals his true identity, she chases him away in a rage. Danny tries to give her Winant's check, but she refuses to accept it.

Returning to his motel room, Danny finds Augie's body hanging in the shower. The police arrest Danny after the hotel manager tells them that he heard both men arguing loudly the previous day. Garvey arrives in Los Angeles and, believing Danny to be innocent, persuades the local police to release him.

Danny travels to Las Vegas, where Soldier works at a casino. Soldier arranges a job for Danny as a blackjack dealer. Fran arrives and Soldier finds her a job as a singer in the lounge.

Danny visits another casino to play craps and builds a small stake into more than $10,000. Victoria phones to warn Fran that Sidney knows that Danny is in Las Vegas. Danny asks Fran to send the money that he had won to Victoria the next morning if anything should happen to him. Believing that Danny is in love with Victoria, Fran decides to leave for Chicago.

Danny waits in his motel room with a gun in his hand. However, Sidney emerges from the bathroom, catching Danny by surprise; After a struggle, he chokes Danny. Garvey and his men, who were following Danny all along, burst into the room and shoot Sidney.

The next morning at the airport, Danny catches Fran before she boards her plane to tell her that he loves her. They kiss and walk back into the airport.

== Cast ==
- Charlton Heston as Danny Haley/Richard Branton
- Lizabeth Scott as Fran Garland
- Viveca Lindfors as Victoria Winant
- Dean Jagger as Capt. Garvey
- Don DeFore as Arthur Winant
- Jack Webb as Augie
- Ed Begley as Barney
- Harry Morgan as Soldier
- Walter Sande as Swede
- Mark Keuning as Billy Winant
- Mike Mazurki as Sidney Winant

== Production ==
Hal Wallis purchased the story, written by John Meredyth Lucas, as a vehicle for his newest discovery, Charlton Heston. Lizabeth Scott and Viveca Lindfors were also attached to the project in its early stages. Wendell Corey was cast as Captain Garvey but his commitment to The Lady of the House (later retitled to Harriet Craig) forced him to withdraw from the project.

The film, with a working title of No Escape, was produced between April 5 and May 12, 1950, with additional scenes and retakes completed between May 9 and May 11. Several Los Angeles-area locations were used: Griffith Observatory, Union Station, North Hollywood, an amusement pier in Ocean Park, the Wilshire Plaza Hotel and the Valley Vista Motel in the San Fernando Valley. Background shots were also filmed in Las Vegas and Chicago.

== Reception ==
In a contemporary review for The New York Times, critic Bosley Crowther wrote:

A new star named Charlton Heston—a tall, tweedy, rough-hewn sort of chap who looks like a triple-threat halfback on a midwestern college football team—is given an unfortunate send-off on the low and lurid level of crime in Hal Wallis' thriller ... He has a quiet but assertive magnetism, a youthful dignity and a plainly potential sense of timing that is the good actor's sine qua non. But in this "clutching hand" chiller, he is called upon to play nothing more complex or demanding than a crooked gambler marked for doom. ... But beyond that the role requires nothing. ... It looks as though Mr. Heston has been hopefully headed down the course of Alan Ladd.

Critic Philip K. Scheuer of the Los Angeles Times wrote: "'Dark City' has the customary appearance of importance in attention to detail and story ramification; it simply doesn't hold up very well. Perhaps the boys sensed as much: Whenever events begin to sag of their own weight, Miss Scott is pushed into the spotlight to bemuse us with another torch ballad."

In his 1985 history of Paramount Pictures, film historian John Douglas Eames cited Dark City as another example of producer Hal Wallis's uncanny eye as a "star-spotter." Casting the inexperienced Heston in the leading role, he wrote, was a gamble that paid off: "The camera took an immediate liking to the strong new face, and so did the public." But Eames echoed contemporary reviews of the film by noting "this dark city had been visited too often before."

The film's legacy has fared somewhat better in the attitude of critics and historians of film noir. Spencer Selby's 1984 study of the genre, Dark City: the Film Noir, takes its title from the film and places it among the top 25 noir classics of all time, in the same company as Gilda, The Maltese Falcon, and Double Indemnity.

However, film-noir historian Carl Macek contends that while the film contains a premise and all the basic elements of a film noir, as well as "a tension and atmosphere that recalls the crisp, dark streets of films like The Street With No Name, Where the Sidewalk Ends and even T-Men," its "overriding sense of hope and compassion leads Dark City away from its invocation of the noir world." In the final analysis, It is "a vision of the noir world without the emphasis of the noir ethos."
