= Our Time (1974 film) =

1974 film by Peter Hyams

- Directed by: Peter Hyams
- Written by: Jane C. Stanton
- Produced by: Richard A. Roth
- Starring: Pamela Sue Martin; Parker Stevenson; Betsy Slade; George O'Hanlon, Jr.
- Cinematography: Jules Brenner
- Edited by: James Mitchell
- Music by: Michel Legrand
- Distributed by: Warner Bros.
- Release date: April 10, 1974
- Running time: 90 minutes
- Country: United States
- Language: English

Our Time (also known as Death of Her Innocence) is a 1974 American drama film directed by Peter Hyams. The film was written by Jane C. Stanton and stars Pamela Sue Martin, Parker Stevenson, and Betsy Slade. The story follows two girls at a Massachusetts boarding school and their experiences with first love in the 1950s. It was released in theaters on April 10, 1974.

== Plot ==
In 1955 Springfield, Massachusetts, Abby Reed and Muffy Pratt are best friends and roommates at Penfield Academy, an all-girls boarding school. They begin the first day of their senior year trading stories about their past summer. Abby, the conventionally beautiful one of the pair, confesses she almost lost her virginity to her boyfriend Michael, who attends the nearby all-boys school St. Ambrose. An insecure Muffy regrets she has not had the opportunity.

At a mixer with St. Ambrose the following night, the girls and boys are paired up randomly after picking numbers. Abby steals away to talk to Michael, who pleads with her to visit him soon. Muffy is paired with Buzzy Knight, whom she a crush on, but the boy does not return her feelings and tries to get paired up with someone else. Malcolm, an awkward boy who has feelings for Muffy, tries to talk to her, but she is oblivious to his affections. Later, while Buzzy dances with Muffy, he holds up money to another boy in an offer to switch girls. A humiliated Muffy leaves the dance early. At the end of the night, Abby promises Michael she will take an overnight trip to visit him in two weeks. When Abby returns to the dormitory, she finds Muffy crying in bed. After Muffy confesses that Buzzy hurt her feelings, Abby tries to cheer her up by saying that Malcolm is in love with her, to no avail.

Abby makes plans to visit Michael by concocting a ruse that she is visiting her grandmother. Muffy impersonates Abby's grandmother over the phone to the headmistress Mrs. Pendleton, and Abby succeeds at getting a weekend pass. Abby and Michael check into a hotel where they have booked separate rooms. He meets Abby in her room that evening, and after some awkwardness, they consummate their relationship. Later, Abby mourns the loss of her virginity, but Michael promises that he won't stop loving her. Back at school, Muffy receives a letter from Buzzy where he apologizes for his behavior. Suspicious of Buzzy, Abby tries to discourage her friend from replying, but Muffy sends him a letter in response, inviting him to a Christmas Eve party at Abby's family home.

At the party, Muffy gives Buzzy all her attention and impulsively kisses him under the mistletoe. However, Buzzy rejects her advances and reveals he is with another girl. Muffy leaves crying, with Malcolm following behind. When he finds her next to his car, she propositions him to take her virginity at that moment; he resists, saying she's in the wrong state of mind, but later relents after she taunts him, and they have sex in the backseat. The experience is not as satisfying as Abby and Michael's. Before returning to the party, Malcolm confesses that he was a virgin until now and Muffy says she feels no different after having sex and doesn't see "what all the big fuss is about."

Back at school, Muffy suspects she is pregnant and sees a doctor; he confirms her pregnancy. She asks the doctor if he can perform an abortion and he recommends she speak to her parents, but Muffy says she cannot tell her parents about this. He also refuses to refer her to any other doctors. Out of options, Muffy seeks out a back-alley abortion. She heads to a nearby city accompanied by Abby, Michael, and Malcolm, where Michael has found someone to perform the procedure. The night before, Abby tells Muffy that Malcolm wants to marry her, but Muffy rejects the idea, saying she wants to have control over her life.

The next day, Muffy meets the doctor Frank, a medical student who promises the abortion will be simple and painless. After the procedure, Muffy joins Abby downstairs and seemingly feels fine. However, back at school, Muffy becomes ill and refuses to allow Abby to tell the school nurse what has caused her hemorrhaging. Soon after, Malcolm, Michael, and Abby go to visit Muffy at the hospital, but discover she has died. On the day of graduation, Abby lies on Muffy's bed and cries before putting on her cap and leaving for the ceremony.

== Cast ==
- Pamela Sue Martin as Abigail "Abby" Reed
- Betsy Slade as Muffy Pratt
- Parker Stevenson as Michael
- George O'Hanlon Jr. as Malcolm
- Karen Balkin as Laura
- Debralee Scott as Ann Alden
- Nora Heflin as Emmy
- Kathryn Holcomb as Helen Connery
- Roderick Cook as Headmaster
- Edith Atwater as Mrs. Margaret Pendleton
- Marijane Maricle as Miss Picard
- Meg Wyllie as Nurse
- Mary Jackson as Miss Moran
- Carol Arthur as Gym Teacher
- Hope Summers as Biology Teacher
- Jerry Hardin as Mr. Keats
- Robert Walden as Frank
- Luke Andreas as Marge
- Darrell Zwerling as Dr. Madden
- Lou Frizzell as Dr. Freeman
- Michael Gray as Buzzy Knight
- Helene Winston as Mrs. H.
- Cliff Emmich as Hotel Clerk

== Production ==
The film was produced by Richard Roth, who had just made Summer of '42 and wanted to do a similar kind of film about young women. The movie was also known as Basic Training and The Girls of Penfield. Roth recruited Michel Legrand, whom he had worked with on Summer of '42, to compose the film's score. The screenplay by Jane Stanton is loosely based on her experiences in New England boarding schools.

Director Peter Hyams had previously made Busting, an R-rated movie about vice cops which had not performed well commercially. With Our Time, "I was trying to do the opposite of what I had done before," he says.

Pamela Sue Martin, Parker Stevenson, Edith Atwater and George O'Hanlon Jr. all would star in The Hardy Boys/Nancy Drew Mysteries later in the 1970s.

== Reception ==
The film received mixed reviews, with multiple critics commenting on the film's contrivances and predictability. Comparisons were made to Summer of '42, which the filmmakers had been attempting to emulate with Our Time. Writing for New York, Judith Crist noted that for Summer, "the moral proved to be that loss of virginity [for boys], via an older woman, guaranteed instant maturity, compassion, sensitivity, and creative perception", whereas with Our Time, young women's loss of virginity to their peers comes with a price. "For the pretty and popular teen-ager, it's the logical step after shaking hands with a boy—and about as meaningful; for the plain-looking and shy girl, it means instant pregnancy, detailed abortion".

Vincent Canby of The New York Times wrote that the film is "a pre‐pill romantic drama designed, perversely, for the prepubescent set" and "combines the worst features of two kinds of ancient Broadway comedy with a gothic lack of sensibility all its own". He found it "difficult to believe" that Peter Hyams "was also the director of the recent 'Busting,' one of the better, more intelligent cop movies. Perhaps teen-age rich girls are not characters with whom he has much sympathy or understanding." T.A. Gallagher of The Village Voice critiqued the film's use of "hazy, gauzy color" to evoke nostalgia.

Ken Emerson of The Boston Phoenix appreciated that the film provides "a sympathetic study of two girls' friendship, a welcome change from the exclusively man-to-man concerns of most films today," but lamented that the director and producer appeared "to distort Ms. Stanton's screenplay into a sentimental account of sexual initiation". Jay Cocks gave a mixed review for Time, but conceded that Hyams "manages the comedy and embarrassment of the first fall mixer well".

Gene Siskel of the Chicago Tribune gave the film 1 star out of 4 and wrote that it "probably sees itself as the female equivalent of 'Summer of '42' ... Unfortunately, the story this time is nothing more than a B-grade soap opera." Arthur D. Murphy of Variety called it "an unexciting, sterile story ... More of a made-for-TV feature than anything else." Some critics said the film failed to say anything about teen pregnancy that wasn't already covered in earlier films like Blue Denim and A Summer Place. Tom Shales of The Washington Post wrote that "Muffy has no redeeming values; she's loathsome and self-pitying. So who are we supposed to care about, much less root for?"

A positive review was given by Kevin Thomas of the Los Angeles Times, who stated that the film "turns nostalgia back on itself with remarkable deftness and subtlety. In doing so it makes certain aspects of the '70s seem not all that bad." He added that "All four of the film's young stars are able and appealing." Praise was also given to Betsy Slade's performance. Cocks of Time wrote she "makes Muffy into the kind of quick, bright, funny girl you want immediately to reassure: to tell her that all the doubts, all the clumsiness will pass in a short time, and she will be really terrific".

A 2011 retrospective review by Glenn Erickson of DVD Savant commended the film for showing the reality of unsafe abortions. He wrote, "Our Time was perhaps released five years too late, or too soon -- in 1974 almost every critical appraisal described it as Old Fashioned, a throwback to the Blue Denim days. That assessment is nonsense, as screenwriter Jane C. Stanton's movie takes place in 1955. It doesn't inject anachronistic sensibilities into its story of teens living under a different set of cultural rules. By 1980 the content of Our Time was being seen in After School Specials on TV. That doesn't make the movie any less relevant to us now."

== See also ==
- List of American films of 1974
