= France Nuyen =

French-American actress, model, and psychological counselor (born 1939)

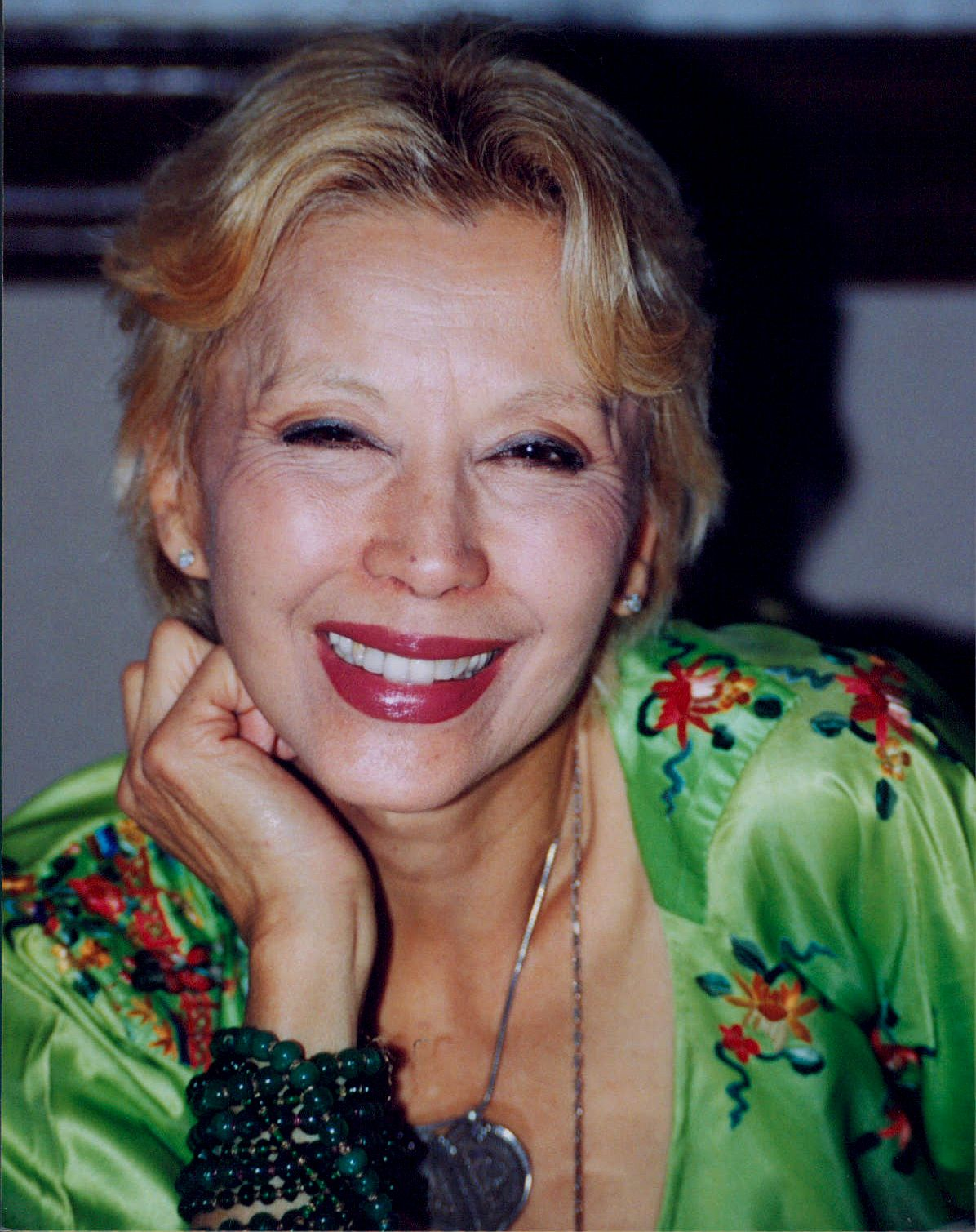
- Nuyen in 2002
- Born: France Nguyen Van Nga; 31 July 1939 (age 87); Marseille, Bouches-du-Rhône, France
- Occupations: Actress; model; psychological counsellor
- Years active: 1958–2008
- Spouses: Thomas Gaspar Morell (m. 1963; div. 1966) Robert Culp (m. 1967; div. 1970)
- Children: 1

France Nuyen (born France Nguyễn Vân Nga on 31 July 1939) is an American actress, model, and psychological counselor. She is known to film audiences for playing romantic leads in South Pacific (1958), Satan Never Sleeps (1962), and A Girl Named Tamiko (also 1962), and for playing Ying-Ying St. Clair in The Joy Luck Club (1993). She also originated the title role in the Broadway play The World of Suzie Wong, based on the novel of the same name. She is a Theatre World Award winner and Golden Globe Award nominee.

== Early life ==
Nuyen was born in Marseille, the daughter of an ethnic Romani mother of French nationality and a father from French Indochina. Her father is widely reported to be Vietnamese (Kinh); however, Nuyen identifies him and herself as Chinese (Hoa).

After leaving school at the age of 11, she began studying art and became an artist's model. She was later signed to Candy Jones' agency, and moved to New York City at age 16. In 1955, Nuyen was discovered while modeling at the Beaux Arts School by Life photographer Philippe Halsman. She was featured on the cover of 6 October 1958 issue of Life.

== Career ==
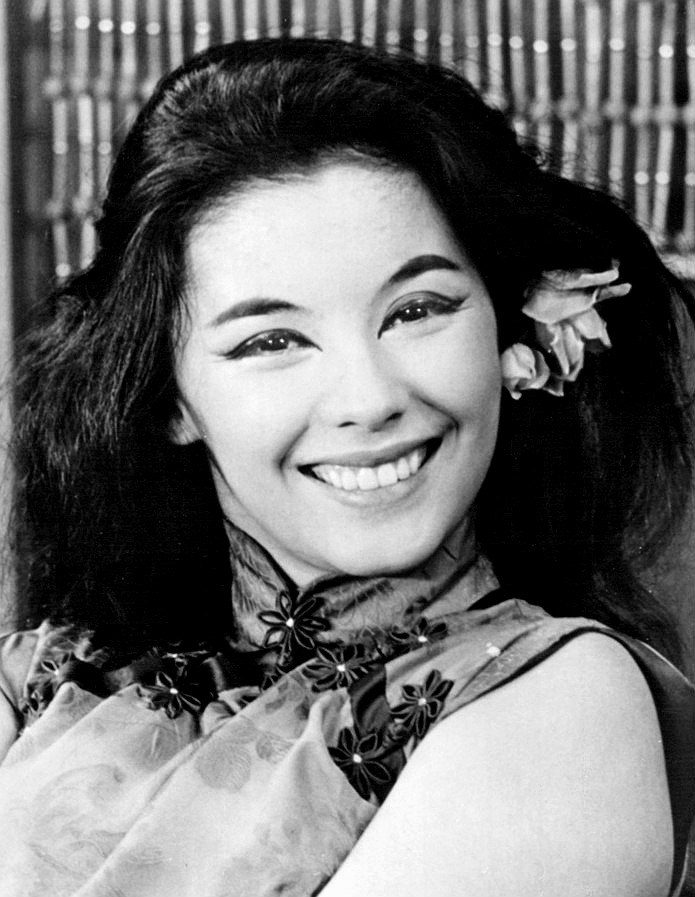
Nuyen in 1958

France Nuyen became a motion picture actress in 1958. In her first role, she appeared as Liat, daughter of Bloody Mary (played by Juanita Hall), in the Rodgers and Hammerstein musical South Pacific.

In 1978 Nuyen guest-starred with Peter Falk and Louis Jourdan in the Columbo episode "Murder Under Glass". In 1986 she joined the cast of St. Elsewhere as Dr. Paulette Kiem, remaining until the series ended in 1988.

Nuyen appeared in several films including The Last Time I Saw Archie (1961) Satan Never Sleeps (1962), A Girl Named Tamiko (1962), Diamond Head (1963), Dimension 5 (1966), Battle for the Planet of the Apes (1973), The Joy Luck Club (1993), and The American Standards (2008).

=== With William Shatner ===
France Nuyen worked several times with actor William Shatner. At age 19, she was cast in Shatner's 1958 Broadway play The World of Suzie Wong. After a dubious initial opening, the play ran for more than 500 performances and was quite financially successful. Both Nuyen and Shatner later collected notable accolades for their work on the show at the 1959 Theatre World Awards.

Nuyen worked again with Shatner across three US television projects, starting with "Elaan of Troyius", a 1968 third season episode of the original Star Trek in which Nuyen was the title character. She would later appear with Shatner in the CBS 1973 made-for-TV movie The Horror at 37,000 Feet, and afterward in a 1974 episode of the Kung Fu series entitled "A Small Beheading".

== Personal life ==
Nuyen had many on-and-off relationships, most notably an affair with Marlon Brando in 1960. From 1963 to 1966, Nuyen was married to Thomas Gaspar Morell, a psychiatrist from New York, by whom she has a daughter who resides in Canada and works as a film make-up artist. She met her second husband, Robert Culp, while appearing in four episodes of his television series I Spy. They married in 1967, but divorced three years later. In 1986, Nuyen earned a master's degree in clinical psychology and began a second career as a counselor for abused women and children and women in prison. She received a Woman of the Year award in 1989 for her psychology work. In the Life cover story on Nuyen, she is quoted as saying a proverb she also repeated in character as a spy in the I Spy episode "Magic Mirror": "I am Chinese. I am a stone. I go where I am kicked."

As of 2019, she resides in Beverly Hills.

== Filmography ==
=== Film ===
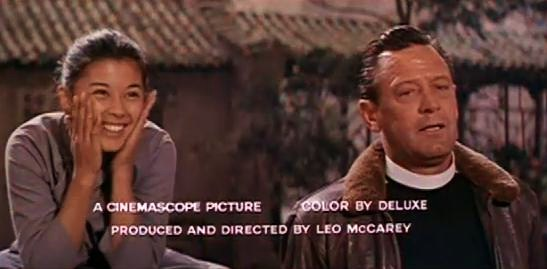
With William Holden, in the Satan Never Sleeps (1962) trailer

- South Pacific (1958) - Liat
- In Love and War (1958) - Kalai Ducanne
- The Last Time I Saw Archie (1961) - Cindy Hamilton
- Satan Never Sleeps (1962) - Siu Lan
- A Girl Named Tamiko (1962) - Tamiko
- Diamond Head (1962) - Mai Chen
- Man in the Middle (1964) - Kate Davray
- Dimension 5 (1966) - Kitty (Ki Ti Tsu)
- Black Water Gold (1970, TV Movie) - Thais
- One More Train to Rob (1971) - Ah Toy
- Slingshot (1971)
- The Horror at 37,000 Feet (1973, TV Movie) - Annalik
- The Big Game (1973) - Atanga
- Battle for the Planet of the Apes (1973) - Alma
- Code Name: Diamond Head (1977, TV Movie) - Tso-Tsing
- Deathmoon (1978, TV Movie) - Tapulua
- Jealousy (1984, TV Movie) - Beth
- Midas Valley (1985, TV Movie) - Mitsi Kawamato
- China Cry (1990) - Mrs. Sung
- Write to Kill (1991) - Alexandra Cordier
- The Joy Luck Club (1993) - Ying-Ying - The Mother
- A Passion to Kill (1994) - Lou Mazaud
- Angry Cafe (1995) - Rosie
- The Magic Pearl (1997) - (voice)
- A Smile Like Yours (1997) - Dr. Chin
- The Battle of Shaker Heights (2003) - Xiou-Xiou Ling
- The American Standards (2008) - Dr. Pierce

=== Television ===
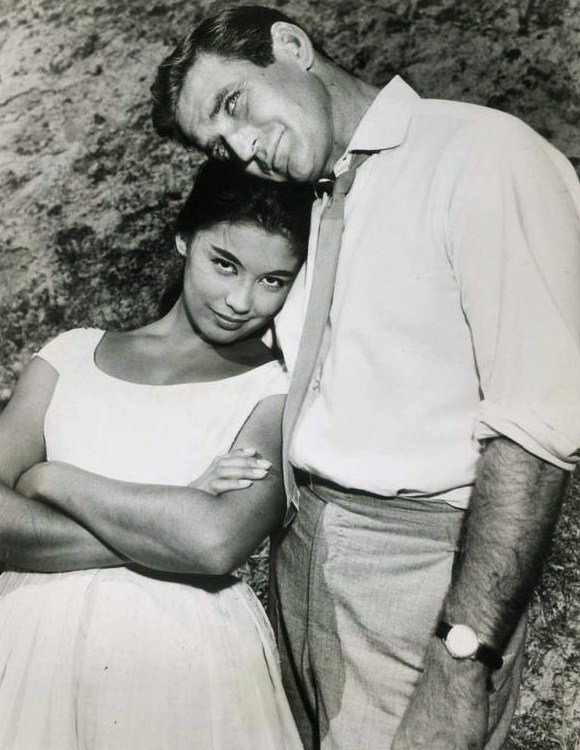
With Rod Taylor, in Hong Kong (1960)

- Hong Kong - episode "Clear for Action" (1960)
- Adventures in Paradise - episode "One Little Pearl" (1960)
- Burke's Law - episode "The Prisoners of Mr. Sin" (1965)
- The Man from U.N.C.L.E. - episode "The Cherry Blossom Affair" (1965)
- Gunsmoke - episode "Gunfighter, R.I.P." (1966) - as Ching Lee (S12E6)
- Gunsmoke (TV series)|Gunsmoke - episode "Honor Before Justice" (1966) - as Sarah
- I Spy - four episodes (1966-1967)
- Star Trek (1968) – Elaan in S3:E13, "Elaan of Troyius"
- Rowan & Martin's Laugh-In (1968)
- Turn-On (1969) - Guested on unaired 2nd episode alongside then husband Robert Culp
- Medical Center - episode "The Battle of Lily Wu" (1969)
- Hawaii Five-O - episode "Highest Castle, Deepest Grave" (1971)
- The Magician - episode "The Illusion of the Lost Dragon" (1974)
- Chopper One - episode "Deadly Carrier" (1974)
- Kung Fu - episode "A Small Beheading" (1974)
- The Six Million Dollar Man - episode "The Coward" (1974)
- Hawaii Five-O - episode "Small Witness, Large Crime" (S7 EP 17, 1975)
- Medical Center - episode "Child of Conflict" (1976)
- Police Story - episode "Thanksgiving" (1976)
- Police Woman episode "The Death of a Dream" (1976)
- Hawaii Five-O - episode "Ready, Aim....." (1977)
- Code Name: Diamond Head (1977)
- Charlie's Angels - episode "Angels in Paradise" (1977)
- Columbo - episode "Murder Under Glass" (1978)
- Fantasy Island - episode "Return to Fantasy Island" (1978)
- Fantasy Island - episode "Return/The Toughest Man Alive" (1978)
- Fantasy Island - episode "Jungle Man/Mary Ann and Miss Sophisticate" (1980)
- Fantasy Island - episode "The Love Doctor/The Pleasure Palace/Possessed" (1980)
- Trapper John, M.D. - episode "The Pagoda Cure" (1981)
- Trapper John, M.D. - episode "It Only Hurts When I Love" (1983)
- Automan - episode "Ships in the Night" (1984)
- Magnum, P.I. - episode "Torah, Torah, Torah" (1985)
- Crazy Like a Fox - episode "Year of the Fox" (1985)
- St. Elsewhere as Dr. Paulette Kiem in 35 episodes (1986-1988)
- Generations - episode "#1.2" (1989)
- Nasty Boys - episode "Home Again" (1990)
- Knots Landing as Dr. Carroll in 5 episodes (1990)
- Raven - episode "The Death of Sheila" (1992)
- Murder, She Wrote - episode "A Death in Hong Kong" (1993)
- Tom Clancy's Op-Center - Li Tang (1995)
- The Outer Limits - episode "Ripper" (1999)
