= First Love (1977 film) =

1977 American romance movie by Joan Darling

- Theatrical release poster
- Directed by: Joan Darling
- Written by: Jane Stanton Hitchcock; David Freeman
- Based on: Sentimental Education by Harold Brodkey
- Produced by: Lawrence Turman; David Foster
- Starring: William Katt; Susan Dey; John Heard; Beverly D'Angelo; Robert Loggia
- Cinematography: Bobby Byrne
- Edited by: Frank Morriss
- Music by: John Barry (uncredited)
- Distributed by: Paramount Pictures
- Release date: November 4, 1977
- Running time: 91 minutes
- Country: United States
- Language: English
- Budget: $3 million
- Box office: $9.4 million

First Love is a 1977 American romantic drama film starring William Katt and Susan Dey and directed by Joan Darling. The movie is based upon the 1957 short story Sentimental Education by Harold Brodkey. The original music score was composed by John Barry. However, much of his score was unused in favor of songs from Cat Stevens and Paul Williams, and material from Carmine Coppola and Jean Sibelius, resulting in Barry removing his name from the credits.

== Plot ==
College student David is having sex with a woman named Shelly until his girlfriend then pounds on his dorm room, demanding to know who is in there with him. Wearing only a towel, Shelly goes into the room next door, which belongs to David's friend Elgin. Shelly says that she will only be there until David finishes having sex with his girlfriend; but it takes a lot longer. David later thanks Elgin by setting him up with Shelly.

Elgin first sees Caroline during a meal. After the meal, Elgin and Shelly separate from David and his girlfriend, ending up in his room. Shelly declares that she likes Elgin, offers to have sex with him and disrobes. Shocked, Elgin spurns her advances.

Elgin is later working as the busboy at the school's cafeteria. There, he has his first conversation with Caroline but ends up spilling tea on her and her book. She still leaves her dormitory name on a sheet of paper and he goes to see her with a new copy of the book. She eventually agrees to go and have coffee with him. She alludes to having another boyfriend, but he is smitten and decides to join a class she is in, three weeks after it had started. Caroline reveals that her father is dead. She and Elgin later go on their first real date to the symphony.

Caroline introduces Elgin to the other man, John, who is already married. She is shaken by this meeting and asks to spend a night with Elgin, because she does not want to be alone. They start having sex but are interrupted by David who says that Elgin is late for work. Elgin runs to work and David convinces Caroline to take a ride back to her dorm on his motorcycle. Elgin spots them together and fights David in a jealous rage. Caroline then tells him that she is not interested in David. Elgin is relieved but later gets fired for being late to work.

David and Caroline watch Elgin while he plays a successful game of soccer. Elgin and Caroline were having sex again when he asks about John, who worked with her father as a lawyer, and whom she had known all her life. He gets jealous after learning that she slept with John, but Caroline gets mad about the entire conversation. Elgin gets nervous when he cannot get hold of her, but finds a note which tells him to join her, alone, at her family's estate. Elgin meets Caroline and they pick up where they left off, but she resists him while they are in her childhood playhouse. She told him that this is the place where her father committed suicide. The phone rings before they drive together back to school. En route, Caroline says that it was John on the phone. Caroline explains that John wants her back, and they cannot see each other any more. Elgin pulls his motorcycle out from the back of the car and leaves alone. Elgin returns to his dorm to find Shelly sitting by his door. Shelly declares her love for David, but thinks that he does not feel the same. Elgin turns Shelly down for sex a second time.

Elgin runs into Caroline saying goodbye to John. She told Elgin that she is with John and that it is over between them. Elgin gets drunk and again finds Shelly at his door. Elgin accepts Shelly's third proposition; but she leaves in the middle of their tryst when he calls her Caroline. Elgin goes to Caroline's shared class, but leaves in the middle of the lecture when she does not show up. Elgin then visits John at his office. He professes his love for Caroline and asks John if his intentions are honorable. John says that he has a shaky marriage, but his kids are important and does not know if he can divorce his wife. Caroline shows up in Elgin's room in the middle of the night, has sex with him, and then brings him breakfast in the morning. John decides that he will not get the divorce, but Elgin is mad that he is second best. Elgin takes Caroline back, despite this fact. This eventually tears him up inside and he tells Caroline his love for her is gone and their relationship is over. He says goodbye to her as she leaves him alone on a train. He later continues his old habit of playing solitary soccer.

== Main cast ==
- William Katt as Elgin Smith
- Susan Dey as Caroline Hedges
- John Heard as David Bonner
- Beverly D'Angelo as Shelley
- Robert Loggia as John March
- Swoosie Kurtz as Marsha
- Tom Lacy as Professor Oxton
- June Barrett as Felicia

== Production ==
The film was shot on location in Portland, Oregon, including at Reed College and the Pittock Mansion.

== Rating ==
In the United States, the film is rated R for its nudity and sexual content.

== Reception ==
Janet Maslin of The New York Times found director Joan Darling "peculiarly misogynistic" in the way the two female lead characters "both pounce avariciously upon Mr. Katt, who seems passive and rather saintly under pressure ... Both Miss Hitchcock's script and Miss Darling's directing suggest that he is far too good for either lover." Gene Siskel of the Chicago Tribune gave the film 2 stars out of 4 and called it "an in-and-out-of-love story with its characters' actions determined only by a writer's whimsy. You watch the picture and realize that the opposite of what is happening could be taking place and it would make just as much or little sense." Arthur D. Murphy of Variety wrote that Katt and Dey were both "excellent" but "an unfortunate element in the story is the never-ending pall of doom that hangs over everything ... where it should have been bittersweet, it's bland-gloomy." Charles Champlin of the Los Angeles Times stated that director Joan Darling "seems indeed to have a nice way with her performers, but some problems of script and casting defeat the film's obvious intentions and make what ought to have been a slight and tender work not only disappointing but actively unpleasant." K.C. Summers of The Washington Post wrote that the film "is the basically ho-hum story of a romance between an inexperienced college boy and a girl who's been around some. Everyone tries very hard, and there are a few feeble attempts at suspense, but the viewer never really gets involved enough to care how the affair ends up." David Ansen of Newsweek declared, "There is one good reason to see First Love, and his name is William Katt ... he manages to radiate sweetness without being cloying, ingenuousness without coyness and sexuality without narcissism." However, Ansen added, director Darling "hasn't quite mastered the transition from TV to screen; everything is staged up front, every emotion hit squarely on the head, and the result is a certain monotony of tone." Tom Milne of The Monthly Film Bulletin wrote, "Fulsomely cradled in slow motion and caressing dissolves, sprinkled with cultural references to Dante and idealistic philosophies, indulging much lachrymose drivel about first love and its irreparable loss, this Son of Love Story similarly tries to prove that the spirit of romance is not dead and proceeds to administer a cruel coup de grâce."

Michael Eisner of Paramount said the film did not lose money "but was not a success".

== Home media ==
The film was released on VHS and DVD. It currently is available for streaming through some services.
