= The Horror at 37,000 Feet =

1973 American horror television film

- Screenplay by: Ronald Austin; James D. Buchanan
- Story by: V. X. Appleton
- Directed by: David Lowell Rich
- Starring: Chuck Connors; Buddy Ebsen; Tammy Grimes; France Nuyen; William Shatner; Paul Winfield
- Composer: Morton Stevens
- Country of origin: United States
- Original language: English

Production
- Producer: Anthony Wilson
- Cinematography: Earl Rath
- Editor: Bud S. Isaacs
- Running time: 74 minutes
- Production company: CBS Television Network

Original release
- Network: CBS
- Release: February 13, 1973

The Horror at 37,000 Feet is a 1973 American supernatural horror television film directed by David Lowell Rich. The film stars Chuck Connors, Buddy Ebsen, Tammy Grimes, William Shatner, and Paul Winfield. It centers on hapless passengers and crew members plagued by demonic forces from within the baggage hold.

== Plot ==
On a Boeing 747 flight from London to New York piloted by Captain Ernie Slade (Chuck Connors), a wealthy architect (Roy Thinnes) and his wife (Jane Merrow) have placed a druidic sacrificial altar in the baggage hold of the airliner. Aboard for the ill-fated trip are ex-priest Paul Kovalik (William Shatner) and millionaire Glenn Farlee (Buddy Ebsen). Soon after takeoff, crew and passengers alike face the supernatural horror that is unleashed from the baggage compartment — the ghosts of the druids, seeking revenge for being uprooted from their ancient home. After the demonic ghosts force the plane back towards London with gale-force winds, they begin freezing the plane's interior. The spirits then torment the passengers with horrific visions and feats of telekinesis. The passengers try to trick the ghosts by sacrificing a doll to them, but it only further angers the spirits. After a few of the passengers and crew are killed, Kovalik moves to the rear of the plane to try and determine what the spirits want. It turns out, they wish to be returned to their ancestral burial grounds, and they require a human sacrifice. An emergency door is then blown open and Kovalik is sucked out of the plane to his death, satisfying the ghosts. They then allow the 747 to land safely.

== Cast ==
- Chuck Connors as Captain Ernie Slade
- Buddy Ebsen as Glenn Farlee
- Tammy Grimes as Mrs. Pinder
- Lynn Loring as Manya
- Jane Merrow as Sheila O'Neill
- France Nuyen as Annalik
- William Shatner as Paul Kovalik
- Roy Thinnes as Alan O'Neill
- Paul Winfield as Dr. Enkalla
- Will Hutchins as Steve Holcomb
- Darleen Carr as Margot
- Brenda Benet as Sally
- Russell Johnson as Jim Hawley
- H. M. Wynant as Frank Driscoll
- Mia Bendixsen as Jodi
- Gerald Peters as Tractor Loader
- Robert Donner as Dispatcher
- Peter Ashton as Clerk
- Veronica Anderson as 2nd Clerk

== Production ==
The Horror at 37,000 Feet was entirely shot on sound stages at the CBS Studio Center, Studio City, Los Angeles, California.

== Reception ==
In a later review, critic Richard Scheib commented: "The Horror at 37,000 Feet is a silly film, although to its credit it and most of the principals do maintain a degree of intent gravity and at least treat the exercise seriously."

Shatner described his character's demise in the movie as one of his "unique ways" of dying: "I get sucked out of an airplane while carrying a lit torch into the airliner's baggage compartment to try to confront a druid ghost." According to Shatner, many of his fans consider the movie the worst film in which he has ever appeared.

The movie debuted on CBS on February 13, 1973, as the "CBS Tuesday Movie" and was the sixth-most watched primetime show of the week, with a 25.9 rating.
