= Trick of the Eye =

1994 American TV Movie

- Genre: Mystery; Thriller
- Based on: Trick of the Eye by Jane Stanton Hitchcock
- Written by: John Gay; Ken and Jim Wheat
- Directed by: Ed Kaplan
- Starring: Ellen Burstyn; Meg Tilly; Barnard Hughes; Paxton Whitehead; Alastair Duncan
- Music by: Allyn Ferguson
- Country of origin: United States
- Original language: English

Production
- Executive producer: Richard Welsh
- Producers: David A. Rosemont; Brent Shields
- Production location: Pasadena, California
- Cinematography: Shelly Johnson
- Editor: Sabrina Plisco-Morris
- Running time: 95 minutes
- Production companies: Signboard Hill Productions; Hallmark Entertainment

Original release
- Network: CBS
- Release: October 23, 1994

Trick of the Eye (later known as Primal Secrets) is a 1994 American made-for-television psychological thriller film starring Ellen Burstyn and Meg Tilly. Directed by Ed Kaplan, it is based on the 1992 novel of the same name by Jane Stanton Hitchcock. The film originally premiered on CBS as a presentation of CBS Sunday Afternoon Showcase on October 23, 1994. The movie currently is on streaming platforms as Primal Secrets. This title was also used for the DVD release in 2010.

== Plot ==
Faith Crowell (Meg Tilly) is a struggling bohemian artist who is commissioned to paint a mural for wealthy, reclusive socialite widow Frances Griffin (Ellen Burstyn). Frances wants Faith to paint murals all over the ornate walls of the abandoned ballroom of her ostentatious 211-acre estate. The theme of the mural is to be the grand entrance of Frances' daughter Cassandra at her debutante ball, which also happens to be the night Cassandra mysteriously died.

Faith soon begins receiving expensive gifts from Frances, which she enjoys but doesn't understand why. Before long, Faith starts picking up on several uncanny resemblances between herself and the dead Cassandra. Eventually, she is invited to live in Frances's mansion until the mural is complete, and she discovers a painting of Cassandra and sees the haunting resemblance.

== Cast ==
- Ellen Burstyn as Frances Griffin
- Meg Tilly as Faith Crowell
- Barnard Hughes as Harry Pitt
- Paxton Whitehead as Deane
- Alastair Duncan as Simon
- Romy Rosemont as Cathy Newman

== Production ==
Trick of the Eye was shot from August 8 to August 31, 1994, at Huntington Library in Pasadena, California.

== Home video releases ==
In July 1995, the film was released under the alternative title Primal Secrets on VHS and LaserDisc by Hallmark Home Entertainment and Image Entertainment.

On January 25, 2010, it was released as Primal Secrets on DVD by Echo Bridge Home Entertainment.
