= Jim Hoagland =

American journalist (1940–2024)

- Born: January 22, 1940; Rock Hill, South Carolina, U.S.
- Died: November 4, 2024 (aged 84); Washington, D.C., U.S.
- Education: University of South Carolina; Columbia University; Aix-Marseille University
- Occupation: Journalist
- Years active: 1960–2020
- Spouse(s): Elizabeth Becker (divorced) Jane Stanton Hitchcock (m. 1995)
- Children: 3
- Awards: Two-time winner of the Pulitzer prize

Jimmie Lee Hoagland (January 22, 1940 – November 4, 2024) was an American journalist. He was a contributing editor to The Washington Post from 2010, previously serving as an associate editor, senior foreign correspondent, and columnist.

Hoagland was a graduate of the University of South Carolina and attended graduate school at Aix-Marseille University and Columbia University.

He worked in journalism for over six decades, beginning as a part-time reporter while a student. Hoagland served as a foreign correspondent from Africa, France, and Lebanon with the Post, and was awarded two Pulitzer Prizes, in 1971 and 1991. He authored one book, based on his coverage in South Africa.

== Background and education ==
Jimmie Lee Hoagland, was born in Rock Hill, South Carolina, in 1940, to parents Lee Roy Hoagland Jr. and Edith Irene Sullivan. He graduated from the University of South Carolina, in 1961, with his bachelor's in journalism. He attended post graduate programs at both the University of Aix-en-Provence (1961–62) in France and as a Ford Foundation fellow (1968–69) at Columbia University in New York City.

Hoagland served in the U.S. Air Force, stationed in West Germany, from 1962 to 1964.

== Career ==
Hoagland began working in journalism in 1958, as a part-time reporter for the Rock Hill Evening News while a student. He worked as a copy editor for The New York Times, from 1964 to 1966, before joining the Washington Post. At the Post, he served as a foreign correspondent, first in Nairobi as a correspondent in Africa, (1969–72) and later in Beirut (1972–75).

In 1976, Hoagland moved to Paris, France where he covered France, Italy, and Spain, in his internationally syndicated column, until returning to the United States in 1978.

He was an Annenberg Distinguished Visiting Fellow at Stanford University's Hoover Institution, (2010–13).

Writing for The Washington Post, Hoagland won the Pulitzer Prize for International Reporting in 1971 "for his coverage of the struggle against apartheid in the Republic of South Africa." Hoagland was banned from South Africa for five years for his reporting on South Africa and apartheid. He wrote a book, South Africa: Civilizations in Conflict, published in 1972.

Hoagland continued writing for The Washington Post, in Washington D.C., as a foreign editor and assistant managing editor for foreign news. In 1991 he won the Pulitzer Prize for Commentary "for searching and prescient columns on events leading up to the Gulf War and on the political problems of Mikhail Gorbachev." In 2010, he was named a contributing editor to The Washington Post, and continued writing for the paper until 2020.

=== Notable works ===
Hoagland wrote the series of columns during the breakup of the Soviet Union; the winning series of stories are listed below.

- Gorbachev Feels The Heat, January 16, 1990
- Iraq: Outlaw State, March 29, 1990
- Soft on Saddam, April 10, 1990
- Gorbachev's Choices...And a Soviet Food Crisis, April 23, 1990
- Turning a Blind Eye to Baghdad, July 5, 1990
- A Real Arab Awakening, August 16, 1990
- ...And the Tale of a Transcript, September 17, 1990
- A Quick Rewrite of History, October 7, 1990
- Gorbachev's Nobel Lifeline, October 16, 1990
- As Good a Snake-Oil Merchant as There Is, November 13, 1990

== Personal life and death ==
Hoagland was married to Elizabeth Becker and they had two children, Lily and Lee Hoagland. He raised them in Paris before the family moved back to Washington D.C. Hoagland and Mrs. Becker would eventually divorce, he later re-married. Hoagland died from a stroke at a Washington D.C. hospital, on November 4, 2024, at the age of 84.

== Awards ==
- 1971 Pulitzer Prize for International Reporting, "for his coverage of the struggle against apartheid in the Republic of South Africa."
- 1977 Overseas Press Club Award for Best Interpretation of Foreign Affairs, Daily Newspaper or Wire Service
- 1991 Pulitzer Prize for Commentary, "for searching and prescient columns on events leading up to the Gulf War and on the political problems of Mikhail Gorbachev."
- 1994 Eugene Meyer Career Achievement Award
- 2002 Cernobbio-Europa Prize by the editors of seven European newspapers for his international reporting
- 2017 South Carolina Hall of Fame, in recognition as a distinguished writer, by the University of South Carolina

== Quotes ==
Regarding the War on Terror:

- "The United States is engaged in a shadow war that must now be the central priority for this president and his administration for every day of his term." -- The Washington Post, 2001
