= Ronald Kirkbride =

Canadian writer (1912–1973)

- Born: Ronald de Levington Kirkbride; February 1, 1912; Victoria, British Columbia, Canada
- Died: March 1973 (aged 61); London, England
- Occupation: Novelist
- Writing career
- Notable work: A Girl Named Tamiko

Ronald de Levington Kirkbride (February 1, 1912 – March 23, 1973) was a Canadian writer of escapist romances, Westerns, and mystery novels. He was probably best known for his novel A Girl Named Tamiko, first published in 1959; it sold one million copies worldwide and a screenplay based on that novel become a 1962 film of the same name, directed by John Sturges.

Kirkbride wrote over two dozen other novels, including Winds Blow Gently (1945), The Private Life of Guy de Maupassant (1947), Still the Heart Sings (1948), David Jordan (1972, ISBN 0-85468-161-2), and Some Darling Sin (1973, ISBN 0-491-00934-8). His spy novel The Short Night was optioned by Alfred Hitchcock to be adapted for a film that was to follow Family Plot, but Hitchcock decided during pre-production that his poor health would prevent him from making the film.
