= The Buckskin Lady =

1957 film

- Theatrical release poster
- Directed by: Carl K. Hittleman
- Written by: Francis Chase Jr. (story); Carl K. Hittleman (writer); David Lang (writer)
- Produced by: D. Jersey Grut (associate producer); Carl K. Hittleman (producer)
- Starring: Patricia Medina; Richard Denning; Gerald Mohr; Henry Hull; Hank Worden
- Cinematography: Ellsworth Fredericks
- Edited by: Harry Coswick
- Music by: Albert Glasser
- Distributed by: United Artists
- Release date: July 1957
- Running time: 66 minutes
- Country: United States
- Language: English

The Buckskin Lady is a 1957 American Western film directed by Carl K. Hittleman and starring Patricia Medina in the title role and Richard Denning as her leading man. The supporting cast features Gerald Mohr, Henry Hull, and Hank Worden. The movie's tagline was, She hid her scarlet past behind a pair of silver .45s!

== Plot ==
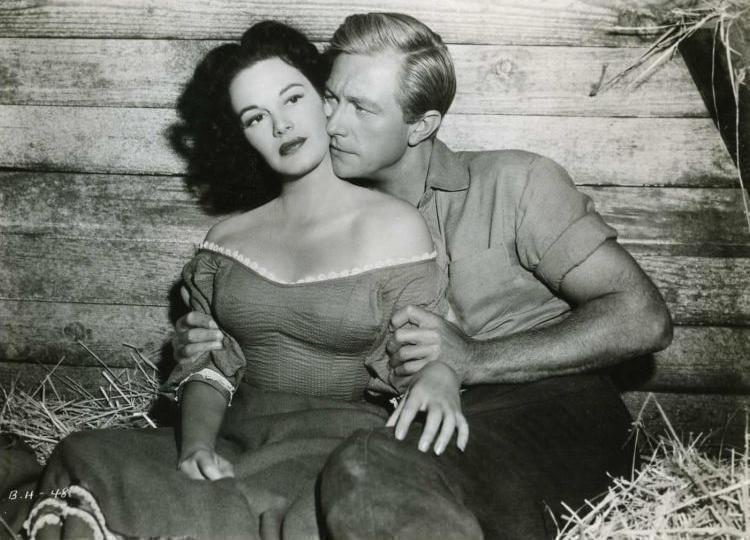
Medina and Denning

Drunken Doc Medley (Henry Hull) and his daughter Angie (Patricia Medina) support themselves by Angie's gambling skills as her father steers travelers to her card table. Angie is in the romantic thrall of tough guy Slinger (Gerald Mohr), though Slinger's rough ways bother her. When her father sells his almost non-existent practice to an unwitting Easterner, Dr. Merritt (Richard Denning), Angie sets out to repay the young doctor. Slinger senses the attraction Angie feels for Merritt and decides to make things difficult for both of them, a decision that leads to robbery and murder.

== Cast ==
- Patricia Medina as Angela Medley
- Richard Denning as Dr. Bruce Merritt
- Gerald Mohr as Slinger
- Henry Hull as Dr. James Goldsboro ("Doc") Medley
- Hank Worden as Lon
- Robin Short as Nevada
- Richard Reeves as Potter
- Dorothy Adams as Mrs. Adams
- Frank Sully as Jed
- George Cisar as Cranston
- Louis Lettieri as Ralphie Adams
- Byron Foulger as Jonathan Latham, bank manager
- John Dierkes as Swanson
- Paul Wexler as Jed

== Soundtrack ==
- Robin Short - "The Buckskin Lady" (Music by Albert Glasser, lyrics by Maurice Keller)
