= A Girl Named Tamiko =

1962 film by John Sturges

- Theatrical film poster
- Directed by: John Sturges
- Written by: Edward Anhalt
- Based on: A Girl Named Tamiko by Ronald Kirkbride
- Produced by: Joseph H. Hazen; Hal B. Wallis
- Starring: Laurence Harvey; France Nuyen
- Cinematography: Charles Lang
- Edited by: Warren Low
- Music by: Elmer Bernstein
- Distributed by: Paramount Pictures
- Release date: December 27, 1962
- Running time: 110 minutes
- Country: United States
- Language: English
- Box office: $1,400,000 (US/ Canada rentals)

A Girl Named Tamiko is a 1962 American romantic drama film directed by John Sturges and starring Laurence Harvey and France Nuyen, with Martha Hyer, Gary Merrill, Michael Wilding, and Miyoshi Umeki. It is based on the 1959 novel of the same title by Ronald Kirkbride.

It was filmed on location in Japan in Technicolor and Panavision, and released by Paramount Pictures.

== Plot ==
Ivan Kalin is a Eurasian photographer who is trapped in Japan, but who wants to emigrate to the United States.

His visa is continually delayed, which causes him to use his charm with women to pull some strings and apply some pressure on the embassy. His romantic magnetism works on a thrill-seeking American and an aristocratic Japanese woman.

== Cast ==
- Laurence Harvey as Ivan Kalin
- France Nuyen as Tamiko
- Martha Hyer as Fay Wilson
- Gary Merrill as Max Wilson
- Michael Wilding as Nigel Costairs
- Miyoshi Umeki as Eiko

== Release ==
The film had its world premiere at the Palace Theatre in Honolulu on December 27, 1962.

== Reception ==
The Monthly Film Bulletin wrote: "Sardonic masochism against tasteful backgrounds is the keynote of this romantic drama. For the first two-thirds of its swollen! length, it trundles its sneering hero in several undramatic directions at once, before plumping for a clinch-in-the-drizzle finale of unconvincing remorse. The erotic by-play allotted to Martha Hyer, Laurence Harvey's whole-hearted absorption in his supercilious role, and the witticisms thrown off by Michael Wilding enliven the long, tortuous drag, but Edward Anhalt's diffuse and sometimes bathetic script never gets the audience close enough to its central character, or deep enough into his mind, to care where his self-hate leads him."

== See also ==
- List of American films of 1962
