= The Short Night =

- Directed by: Alfred Hitchcock
- Screenplay by: James Costigan; Ernest Lehman; David Freeman
- Based on: The Short Night (novel) by Ronald Kirkbride
- Language: English

The Short Night was a film planned by British director Alfred Hitchcock.

The project was originally announced in the late 1960s at the time of Topaz and Hitchcock scouted locations in Finland. A romantic suspense thriller with espionage elements, the script was based on both a same-titled novel by Ronald Kirkbride, and the non-fiction book documenting the case of real-life double agent George Blake titled The Springing of George Blake by Sean Bourke, the motion picture rights to both of which Hitchcock acquired.

== Plot ==
Gavin Brand, a double agent, has escaped from London's Wormwood Scrubs Prison and is headed for Russia.

An American named Joe Bailey, brother to one of Brand's victims, is called on by the CIA to kill Brand through finding his family. The objective, as put by CIA chief Zelfand, is to "find the wife and kids, find the husband." Bailey reluctantly accepts the assignment to kill Brand and finally tracks down Brand's family to a private island near Savonlinna in Finland, where they are watched over by Soviet minders.

Bailey and Brand's wife, Carla, develop a romance as he waits patiently for Brand to show up. After they consummate their love, Brand arrives and attempts to kill both Bailey and Carla, leading to her becoming trapped in a gas-styled sauna. Bailey rescues Carla and, with the help of a Finnish police officer, they try to stop Brand making it to the Finnish-Soviet border on a train with his kidnapped children.

After they consummate their love, Brand arrives and is informed about the affair by the Soviet minders. Brand heads for the border with his wife and children, with intentions to kill his wife once they're over the Russian border. In the Freeman draft, Brand leaves Carla for dead in a gas sauna which Bailey rescues her from.

With help from a Finnish police chief, they try to stop Brand making it across the border with his kidnapped children. In the first Lehman draft, Brand is killed. In the second Lehman draft, he is arrested before he can make it to Russia. In the Freeman draft, Brand makes it across the border, but without his children.

== Production ==
Hitchcock commissioned screenplays by James Costigan and frequent collaborator Ernest Lehman, both of whom wrote several drafts. The script draft by David Freeman, reproduced in Freeman's book The Last Days of Alfred Hitchcock, takes place after the prison break out of Gavin Brand (the screenplay's version of Blake).

Hitchcock, comparing his intentions for the project to Notorious, considered Walter Matthau, a onetime guest star on Alfred Hitchcock Presents, for the role of Brand. He also reportedly offered the same role to Ed Lauter, who appeared in Family Plot, as well as Sean Connery, Clint Eastwood, and Steve McQueen. French international film star Catherine Deneuve and Norwegian star Liv Ullmann were considered for the leading female role. The movie was to be filmed on location in Finland. Because of the director's ill health, Universal Pictures cancelled the project in 1979, and the film never got beyond the early pre-production stage with such Hitchcock associates as Norman Lloyd, Henry Bumstead and Robert F. Boyle actively involved.

== See also ==
- List of unproduced Alfred Hitchcock projects
