= Sven Hugo Borg =

Swedish-American character actor (1896–1981)

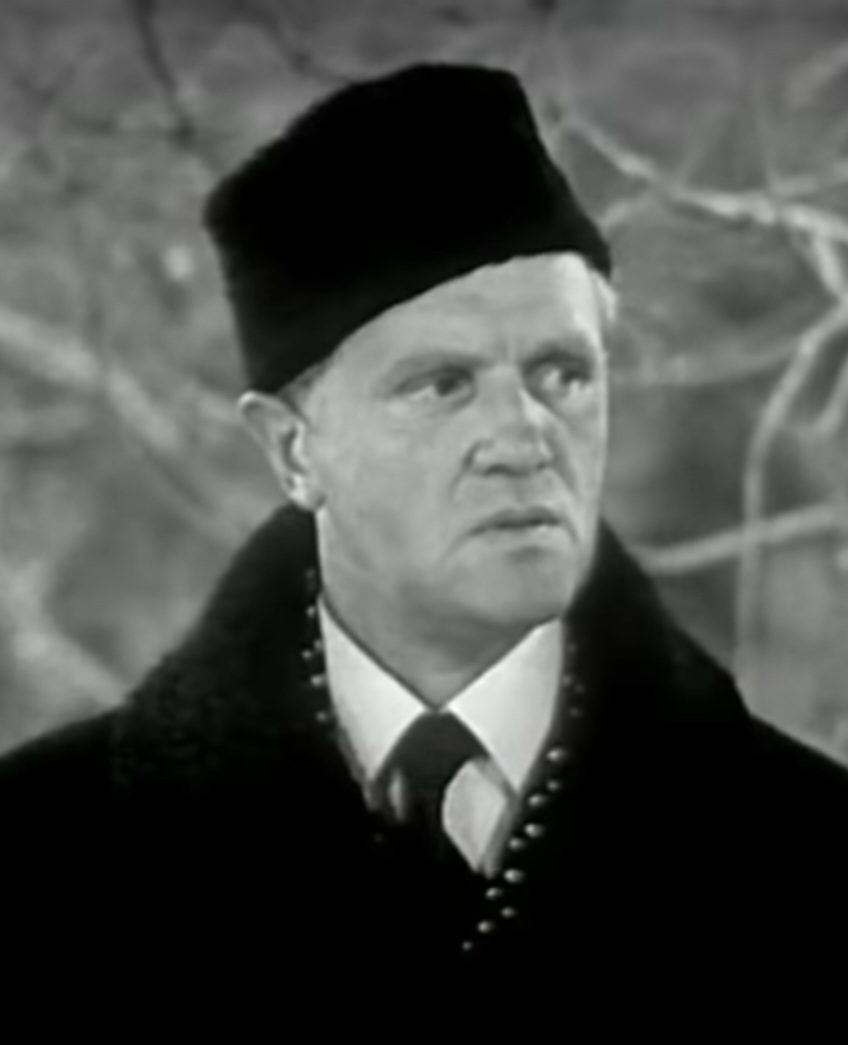
- Borg in They Raid by Night (1943)
- Born: Sven Hugo Borg; 26 July 1896; Vinslöv, Skåne län, Sweden
- Died: 19 February 1981 (aged 84)
- Resting place: Westwood Village Memorial Park
- Occupation: Actor
- Years active: 1928–1963

Sven Hugo Borg (July 26, 1896 - February 19, 1981) was a Swedish-American character actor.

== Biography ==
Sven Hugo Borg was born in Vinslöv, Skåne län, Sweden. Early in his career, Borg was a secretary with the Swedish Consulate in Los Angeles. While working at the consulate he met the actress Greta Garbo who had recently arrived in Hollywood. Garbo asked Borg to be her interpreter for an upcoming movie to which he readily agreed. He served as Garbo's interpreter from 1925 to 1929. After interpreting for Greta, Borg decided to pursue acting as a career. He had done some dramatic work on the Swedish stage. He continued to remain with the consulate until the late 1930s.

Borg became much in demand during World War II Hollywood films, playing both Nazi officers and Scandinavian resistance fighters. Throughout his acting career, Borg was an actor who portrayed a wide range of many different characters, e.g. Sverre-King of Norway in The Crusades. Borg died in 1981 at the age of 84 in Los Angeles, California. He was buried in Westwood Village Memorial Park.

== Filmography ==
- Rose-Marie (1928) .... Hudson
- Let's Fall in Love (1933) .... Eric (uncredited)
- I'll Love You Always (1935) .... Hamlet (uncredited)
- The Crusades (1935) .... Sverre, the Norse King (as Sven-Hugo Borg)
- Barbary Coast (1935, ... a.k.a. Port of Wickedness (US: reissue title) .... Sailor (uncredited)
- Dangerous Waters (1936) .... Sailor (uncredited)
- The Country Doctor (1936) .... Logger (uncredited)
- A Son Comes Home (1936) .... Swedish Sailor (uncredited)
- Theodora Goes Wild (1936) .... Bartender (uncredited)
- Find the Witness (1937) .... Diver
- Espionage (1937) .... Masseuse (uncredited)
- Slave Ship (1937) .... Crew Member (uncredited)
- The Mysterious Pilot (1937, Serial) .... Lumberjack Smitht [Ch.11] (uncredited)
- Here's Flash Casey (1938) .... Blonde Student (uncredited)
- Romance of the Redwoods (1939) .... Boarder (uncredited)
- Espionage Agent (1939) .... Chauffeur (uncredited)
- The Man from Montreal (1939) .... Mountie (uncredited)
- Death Rides the Range (1939) .... Baron Strakoff
- Mystery Sea Raider (1940) .... Sven
- Captain Caution (1940) .... Sailor (uncredited)
- Little Nellie Kelly (1940) .... Immigrant at Citizenship Ceremony (uncredited)
- Comrade X (1940) .... Streetcar Passenger (uncredited)
- Road Show (1941) .... Brawler (uncredited)
- Buzzy and the Phantom Pinto (1941) .... Kurt F. Henck
- Man Hunt (1941) .... Ship's Mate (uncredited)
- The Son of Davy Crockett (1941, ... a.k.a. Blue Clay (UK)) .... Swede (uncredited)
- Night of January 16 (1941) .... Sailor (uncredited)
- Law of the Timber (1941) .... Olaf (as Sven-Hogo Borg)
- Dangerously They Live (1941) .... U-Boat Under Officer (uncredited)
- To Be or Not to Be (1942) .... German soldier (uncredited)
- Reap the Wild Wind (1942, ... a.k.a. Cecil B. DeMille's Reap the Wild Wind (US: complete title)) .... Blackie, 'Falcon' Crewman (uncredited)
- The Affairs of Jimmy Valentine (1942, ... a.k.a. Unforgotten Crime (US: TV title)) .... Olaf
- They Raid By Night (1942) .... Dalberg
- Invisible Agent (1942) .... German Captain (uncredited)
- Desperate Journey (1942) .... Mechanic (uncredited)
- The Devil with Hitler (1942, Short, ... a.k.a. The Devil Checks Up (US: 16mm release title)) .... Gestapo Guard (uncredited)
- The Navy Comes Through (1942) .... U-Boat first officer (uncredited)
- Stand By All Networks (1942) .... Sailor (uncredited)
- Chetniks (1943, ... a.k.a. Chetniks! The Fighting Guerrillas (US: poster title)... a.k.a. The Fighting Guerrillas (US: new title)) .... Nazi Officer (uncredited)
- Tarzan Triumphs (1943, ... a.k.a. Edgar Rice Burroughs' Tarzan Triumphs (US: complete title)) .... Heinz (uncredited)
- The Moon Is Down (1943) .... Sergeant (uncredited)
- Tonight We Raid Calais (1943) .... German Soldier (uncredited)
- They Came to Blow Up America (1943) .... Cmdr. Ullrich Hauser
- This Land Is Mine (1943) .... German Soldier (uncredited)
- Action in the North Atlantic (1943) .... Norwegian Seaman (uncredited)
- Above Suspicion (1943) .... German Guard (uncredited)
- Appointment in Berlin (1943) .... Stockholm Waiter (uncredited)
- First Comes Courage (1943) .... Captain Schmidt (uncredited)
- Adventures of the Flying Cadets (1943, Serial) .... Jake (uncredited)
- The Strange Death of Adolf Hitler (1943) .... Soldier (uncredited)
- I Dood It (1943, ... a.k.a. By Hook or by Crook (UK)) .... German Valet (uncredited)
- The Cross of Lorraine (1943) .... German guard (uncredited)
- Jack London (1943) .... Axel (uncredited)
- What a Woman! (1943, ... a.k.a. The Beautiful Cheat (UK)) .... Ricky (uncredited)
- None Shall Escape (1944) .... German Soldier (uncredited)
- Two-Man Submarine (1944) .... Nazi Officer (uncredited)
- Knickerbocker Holiday (1944) .... Swedish Colonist (uncredited)
- Address Unknown (1944) .... Angry German at Play (uncredited)
- The Story of Dr. Wassell (1944) .... Dutch Guard (uncredited)
- U-Boat Prisoner (1944, ... a.k.a. Dangerous Mists (UK)) .... U-Boat Lt. Dorner (uncredited)
- Secrets of Scotland Yard (1944) .... Nazi Messenger (uncredited)
- My Buddy (1944) .... German Sniper (uncredited)
- Counter-Attack (1945, ... a.k.a. One Against Seven (UK) (US: working title)) .... German Lieutenant (uncredited)
- Nob Hill (1945) .... Swedish Sailor (uncredited)
- Pursuit to Algiers (1945, ... a.k.a. Sherlock Holmes in Pursuit to Algiers (US: series title)) .... Johansson (uncredited)
- Blondie's Lucky Day (1946) .... Jensen, Butler's Masseur (uncredited)
- Spook Busters (1946) .... Slip's Relative at Graduation (uncredited)
- The Farmer's Daughter (1947) .... Dr. Mattsen (uncredited)
- The Senator Was Indiscreet (1947, ... a.k.a. Mr. Ashton Was Indiscreet (UK)) .... Swedish Waiter (uncredited)
- Letter from an Unknown Woman (1948) .... Mover (uncredited)
- Annie Was a Wonder (1949, Short, ... a.k.a. John Nesbitt's Passing Parade: Annie Was a Wonder (US: series title)) .... Gus (as Hugo-Sven Borg)
- Cargo to Capetown (1950) .... Captain (uncredited)
- The Reformer and the Redhead (1950) .... Finnish-American Speaker (uncredited)
- Fortunes of Captain Blood (1950) .... Swede
- Santa Fe (1951) .... 'Swede' Swanstrom
- Reunion in Reno (1951) .... Swedish Waiter (uncredited)
- Mutiny (1952) .... Sailor in Saloon (uncredited)
- Captain Pirate (1952, ... a.k.a. Captain Blood, Fugitive (UK)) .... Swede
- Desirée (1954) .... Aide (uncredited)
- It's Always Fair Weather (1955) .... Svenson – Masseur (uncredited)
- The Gale Storm Show (1957, TV Series, ... a.k.a. "Oh! Susanna" – Swiss Miss).... Archer
- The Prize (1963) .... Oscar Lindblom, Dead Make-up Artist (uncredited) (final film role)

== Other sources ==
- Borg, Sven-Hugo The Only True Story of Greta Garbo’s Private Life (Amalgamated Press, Ltd., London, England. 1933)
- Wollstein, Hans J. Strangers in Hollywood: the history of Scandinavian actors in American films from 1910 to World War II (Scarecrow Press. 1994) ISBN 978-0-8108-2938-1
