= David Freeman (screenwriter) =

American writer

- Born: June 16, 1941 (age 85); Cleveland, Ohio, U.S.
- Education: Yale School of Drama
- Occupations: Screenwriter; novelist; playwright; teacher; journalist
- Spouse: Judith Gingold deceased
- Writing career
- Language: English
- Genres: Drama, journalism
- Notable works: First Love; The Border; Street Smart

David Freeman is an American novelist, screenwriter, playwright, and journalist who studied playwriting and dramatic literature at the Yale Drama School and currently teaches screenwriting seminars in Los Angeles, where he lived with his wife Judith Gingold.

Freeman wrote the last draft for Alfred Hitchcock's final project, The Short Night, a projected spy thriller which was never produced due to Hitchcock's failing health. Freeman wrote about his experiences in the 1984 book The Last Days of Alfred Hitchcock, which includes his completed screenplay.

== Filmography (as screenwriter) ==
- The Catcher (TV movie) (1972)
- Promise Him Anything (TV movie) (1975)
- Heroes (1977) (uncredited)
- First Love (1977)
- The Border (1982)
- Street Smart (1987)

== Plays (as playwright) ==
- Jesse and the Bandit Queen
- A First Class Man

== Bibliography (as author) ==
- It's All True (novel)
- One of Us (novel)
- A Hollywood Education (short story collection)
- The Last Days of Alfred Hitchcock (memoir)
