= Elaan of Troyius =

- Star Trek: The Original Series episode
- Episode no.: Season 3 Episode 13
- Directed by: John Meredyth Lucas
- Written by: John Meredyth Lucas
- Cinematography by: Jerry Finnerman
- Production code: 057
- Original air date: December 20, 1968

Guest appearances
- France Nuyen – Elaan; Jay Robinson – Ambassador Petri; Tony Young – Kryton; Lee Duncan – Evans; Victor Brandt – Watson; K.L. Smith – Klingon Captain; Dick Durock – Guard #1; Charles Beck – Guard #2; Eddie Paskey – Lt. Leslie; Frank da Vinci – Transporter Operator; William Blackburn – Lt. Hadley; Roger Holloway – Lt. Lemli

Episode chronology
| ← Previous "The Empath" | Next → "Whom Gods Destroy" |
- Star Trek: The Original Series season 3

"Elaan of Troyius" is the thirteenth episode of the third season of the American science fiction television series Star Trek. Written and directed by John Meredyth Lucas, it was first broadcast on December 20, 1968.

In the episode, the Enterprise ferries a spoiled princess whose betrothal, it is hoped, will bring peace to a star system at war.

== Plot ==
The Federation starship Enterprise arrives at the planet Elas to pick up Elaan, the Dohlman of Elas. Accompanying them is Ambassador Petri of Troyius, a planet with which Elas has been at war. As Petri explains, the Elasian Council of Nobles and the Troyius Tribunal have agreed to marry Elaan to the Troyian king to secure peace, lest the two planets destroy each other. Elaan is a most reluctant bride, cursing an arrangement that she considers a humiliation. Ambassador Petri's mission is to instruct the Dohlman in the manners and customs of the Troyians.

Not long after the Enterprise begins the return journey to Troyius at low impulse speed, a Klingon warship is detected, which paces the Enterprise and ignores all hails. To complicate matters further, Elaan stabs Petri, who refuses to have any further dealings with the Dohlman and vows that his ruler will never marry her. The job of teaching her falls to Captain Kirk.

In Sickbay, Nurse Chapel asks the ambassador why Elasian women are so prized in spite of their savagery. Petri explains that when the tears of an Elasian female touch a man's skin, his heart is "enslaved forever".

Elaan does not take kindly to Kirk's efforts to educate her and attempts to stab him. He overpowers her, disarms her, and insists that she will learn what she has been ordered to learn. Elaan locks herself in a bathroom and begins to cry, saying she is tired of being hated by everyone. Kirk tries to comfort her, and after wiping a tear from her cheek he finds himself quickly besotted with Elaan. The two begin a passionate sexual relationship that turns into a love affair.

Meanwhile, one of the ship's engineers is killed by Kryton, Elaan's chief bodyguard, who then tampers with the Enterprise's warp engines and tries to contact the Klingon battle cruiser. He is arrested by security, but commits suicide before he can be interrogated. Kirk orders Chief Engineer Scott to inspect the ship's propulsion systems. Elaan reveals that Kryton was in love with her and had been infuriated by the news of the arranged marriage.

The Klingon battlecruiser then begins what appears to be an attack. As Kirk orders the Enterprise to go to warp, Scott reports that, as a result of Kryton's sabotage, any attempt to do so will destroy the ship. As the Klingon passes by without firing, it becomes clear that they were hoping to destroy the Enterprise without an overt act of war. This plan having failed, the Klingons attack in earnest. Mr. Scott reports that the damage done by Kryton to the dilithium crystal array has made it impossible to go to warp or to fire their weapons.

In Sickbay, Ambassador Petri again approaches Elaan and begs her to accept the necklace of Troyian royal jewels that was to be worn at her wedding, as a symbol of the hope for peace between their two worlds. Elaan accepts the necklace and subsequently appears on the bridge wearing it. Spock detects strange energy readings from some of the jewels. Elaan describes them as common stones. The stones are actually dilithium crystals, which explains the Klingons' interest in this star system.

The crystals are taken to Engineering, where Scott and Spock work to replace the damaged dilithium crystals as the battlecruiser moves in for the kill. Power is restored to the Enterprise just before the Klingons’ final attack. After suffering serious damage from the Enterprise's photon torpedoes, the Klingon ship is successfully driven off.

The Enterprise arrives at Troyius with a much changed Elaan. Before she departs, Elaan gives Kirk her dagger as a memento, explaining she has learned that "on Troyius, they do not wear such things." In the transporter room, she and Kirk say their farewells and Elaan is beamed down to the planet, weeping.

Later, McCoy appears on the bridge to report he has found an antidote to the Elasian tears, but it seems not to be needed after all. As Mr. Spock points out, "The Enterprise infected the Captain long before the Dohlman did."

== Production and reception ==
Cut from the episode was a scene in the ship's recreation room, where Kirk, McCoy, Uhura and Spock meet and discuss how to calm Elaan. Uhura suggests using the sound of Spock's Vulcan harp to calm her; the music is later heard piped into Elaan's cabin.

This episode features the first appearance of the D-7 class Klingon battle cruiser designed and built by Star Trek art director Walter M. Jefferies. The footage of the Klingon battle cruiser was re-used in subsequent episodes of the third season.

France Nuyen had previously starred with William Shatner on Broadway for two years in the title role of The World of Suzie Wong. She would later guest-star along with Shatner, as husband and wife, in the Kung Fu season 3 episode "A Small Beheading".

This is the last episode lit by cinematographer Gerald Finnerman, who had been with the show since the first episode.

This episode is also the final appearance in the original series (as originally broadcast) of Eddie Paskey as Lt. Leslie.

The episode's title character pays tribute to Helen of Troy from Homer's Iliad, and its plot borrows from William Shakespeare's comedy, The Taming of the Shrew.

Trek Navigator's Mark A. Altman gave the episode two stars stating "A thinly veiled version of The Taming of the Shrew, the episode is largely carried on the shoulders of William Shatner."

The A.V. Club's Zack Handlen rates "Elaan of Troyius" as a B, making note of character development and the unexpected ending: "If you'd asked me to predict the rest of the episode after Elaan and Kirk hooked up, I would've guessed it would have something to do with Kirk interfering with the wedding ... [i]nstead, we get a nifty space battle against the Klingons, a traitor in the Elasians, an unexpected source of dilithium crystals, and a curiously muted performance from Shatner that does a good job at conveying his internal struggle between feeling and duty without overselling it."

Samuel Walters of [dauntlessmedia.net] rates the episode as a C−, citing a "scattershot approach to the plot" which "leaves too many possibilities unexplored and underdeveloped," and calling the entire episode "flat."

== Critical response and analysis ==
Popular and scholarly viewers alike express uncertainty if this episode was written with a feminist ethos in mind — mocking the perceived stereotypes of women at the time — or if the episode is just another portrayal of colonial and patriarchal depictions of women. The superficial depiction of Elaan as an exoticized, seductive, and stereotypically uncooperative feminine character has garnered scholarly discussions over whether Elaan is a pro-feminist or anti-feminist character within the history of Star Trek – a series known for its progressive characterizations (first primetime interracial kiss on TV, gay actors).

Star Trek reviewer Jamahl Epsicokhan responds to the episode with a lukewarm assessment, asserting, "The problem (or, more specifically, the running gag)—Elaan is a terrible-mannered woman from a society short on manners. She must be taught in the ways of etiquette. Her teacher (after she stabs the first one) is James T. Kirk, naturally. Watchable, mostly brainless, middle-of-the-road fare, "Elaan of Troyius" is at its best when it shows Kirk balancing the approaches of diplomacy and forceful wording when dealing with the brat that Elaan is." Epsicokhan identifies Elaan as the antagonist of the story - a plot device that Kirk needs to overcome.

Other scholars frame Elaan through a feminist lens. Jarrah Hodge, host of podcast Women of Warp, asserts that Elaan is “othered,” exoticized, and objectified: "This technique showing women’s body parts separately, before or instead of showing her face, is a classic example of objectification. This type of “dismemberment” depiction (as part of a larger culture) encourages men and women to see women as a collection of parts, rather than of a whole." She cites Daniel Leonard Bernardi in Star Trek and History: Race-ing Toward a White Future, who claims that “Elaan exemplifies two stereotypes about Asian women, starting off as a manipulative ‘dragon lady’ and ending as the ‘submissive female slave’”.

Media Critic and historian L.I. Underhill writes that even though Shatner and Nuyen are convincingly in love, the script has "racist and sexist imagery about manipulative and savage foreign women". Underhill focuses on Asian female stereotypes and colonialist themes: ‘Elaan of Troyius’ brings into play stereotypes of the Asian female – the manipulative dragon lady and the submissive female slave. Elaan is both irrational and primitive; she throws temper tantrums, eats with her hands, and drinks from the bottle. Kirk tells her, ‘Nobody’s told you that you’re an uncivilized savage, a vicious child in a woman’s body, an arrogant monster.’ Captain Kirk, the ‘white knight’ of Star Trek, articulates his and the Federation’s moral superiority and authority over the Asian-alien and her people through sexual conquest.

Scholar Lori Ann Stephens explains the complexity of Elaan’s character and her place as a protagonist that inspires admiration in Kirk by the end of the episode: “As the episode unfolds, we learn that in spite of her beauty, her stubbornness, and her magical tears, nothing can grant Elaan complete agency or self-determination. It is her fierce struggle against this fate that makes her such an extraordinary and admirable character.” Elaan has to forsake all of her desires and autonomy in order to ensure interplanetary peace through an arranged marriage, a reflection of the experiences of real women in diplomatic history: "One might conclude that she has no other choice, just as hundreds of women have been treated as tools to facilitate exchanges of land, titles, financial security, and peace treaties."

== Releases ==
This episode was released in Japan on December 21, 1993 as part of the complete season 3 LaserDisc set, Star Trek: Original Series log.3. A trailer for this and the other episodes was also included, and the episode had English and Japanese audio tracks. The cover script was スター・トレック TVサードシーズン.

This episode was included in TOS Season 3 remastered DVD box set, with the remastered version of this episode.
