= Captain Pirate =

1952 American film by Ralph Murphy

- Theatrical release poster
- Directed by: Ralph Murphy
- Screenplay by: Robert Libott; Frank Burt; John Meredyth Lucas
- Based on: Captain Blood Returns by Rafael Sabatini
- Produced by: Harry Joe Brown
- Starring: Louis Hayward; Patricia Medina; John Sutton
- Cinematography: Charles Lawton Jr.
- Edited by: Gene Havlick
- Music by: George Duning
- Color process: Technicolor
- Production company: Columbia Pictures
- Distributed by: Columbia Pictures
- Release date: August 27, 1952
- Running time: 85 minutes
- Country: United States
- Language: English

Captain Pirate is a 1952 American Technicolor swashbuckler adventure film directed by Ralph Murphy and starring Louis Hayward, Patricia Medina and John Sutton. The plot is based on the 1931 Rafael Sabatini short-story collection Captain Blood Returns, and the film is a sequel to Fortunes of Captain Blood (1950).

== Plot ==
Captain Blood is pardoned by the Crown for his crimes against Spain on the Spanish Main. By 1690, he is living in the West Indies on his plantation, where he practices medicine and is to be married to Isabella. He is arrested on a piracy charge after Cartagena is raided and false word spreads that he was the leader of the invasion. To prove himself innocent, he must sail again.

== Cast ==
- Louis Hayward as Captain Peter Blood
- Patricia Medina as Dona Isabella
- John Sutton as Hilary Evans
- Charles Irwin as Angus McVickers
- Ted de Corsia as Captain Easterling
- Rex Evans as Governor Henry Carlyle
- Malú Gatica as Amanda
- George Givot as Tomas Velasquez
- Robert McNeeley as Manuelito
- Nina Koshetz as Madame Duval
- Ian Wolfe as Viceroy
- Lester Matthews as Col. Ramsey
- Sven Hugo Borg as Swede
- Sandro Giglio as Don Ramon

== Production ==
Filming took place in August 1951.
