= Patricia Medina =

British actress (1919–2012)

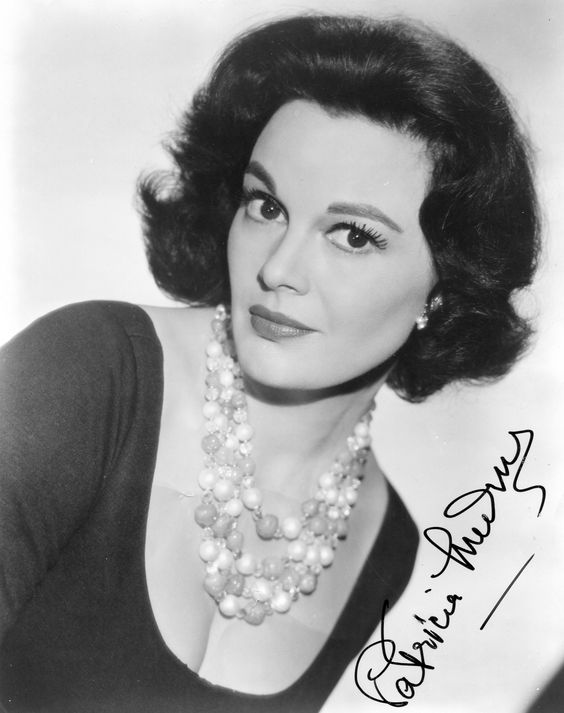
- Medina in the 1950s
- Born: Patricia Paz Maria Medina; 19 July 1919; Liverpool, Lancashire, England
- Died: 28 April 2012 (aged 92); Los Angeles, California, U.S.
- Resting place: Blandford Cemetery, Petersburg, Virginia
- Other name: Patricia Medina Cotten
- Occupation: Actress
- Years active: 1937–1978
- Spouses: Richard Greene (m. 1941; div. 1951) Joseph Cotten (m. 1960; died 1994)

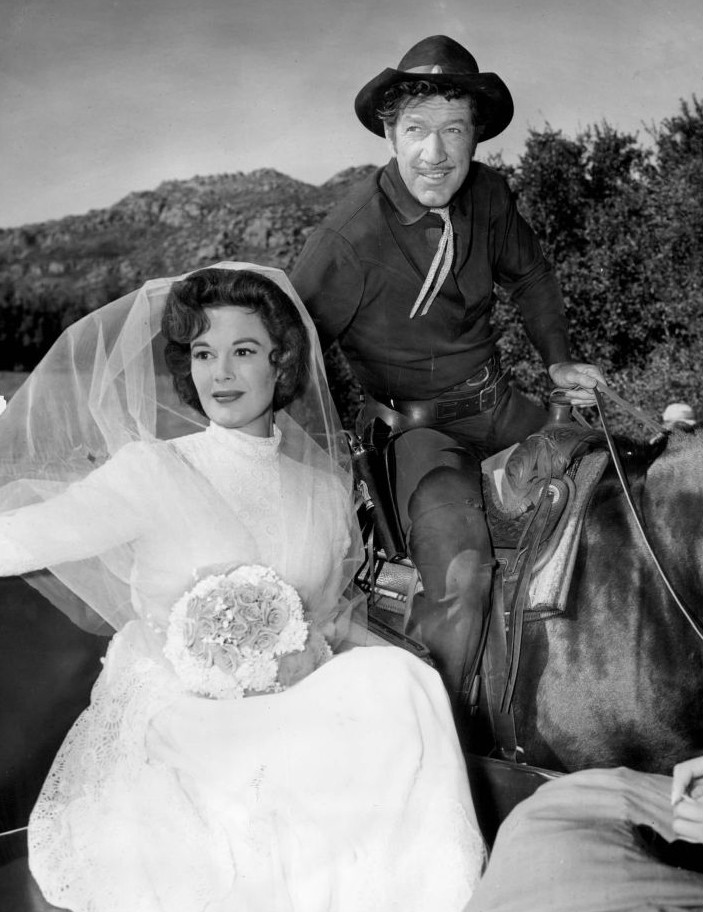
Medina and Richard Boone in Have Gun - Will Travel (1959)

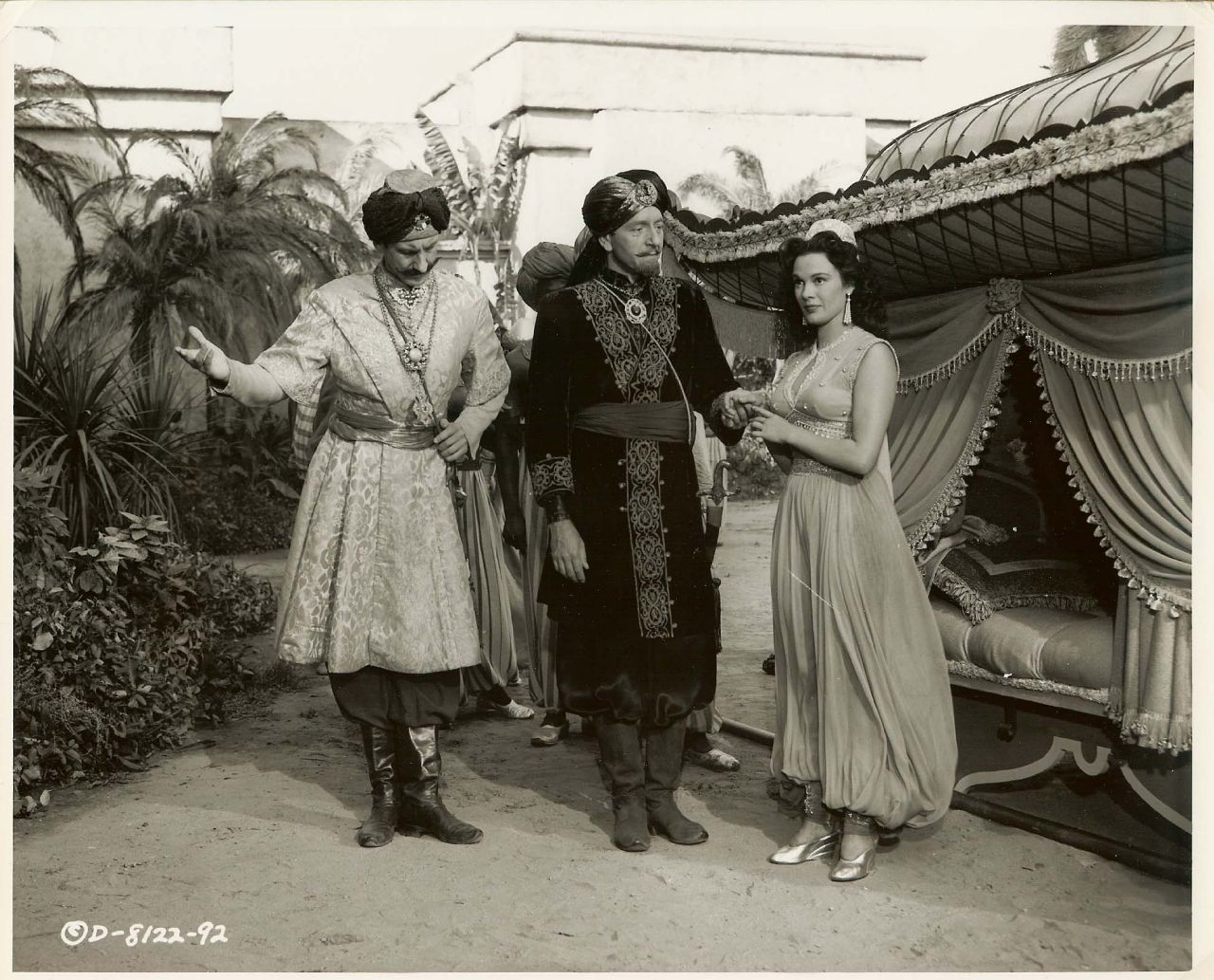
Siren of Bagdad (1953) with Hans Conried and Paul Henreid

Patricia Paz Maria Medina (19 July 1919 – 28 April 2012) was a British actress. She is perhaps best known for her roles in the films Phantom of the Rue Morgue (1954) and Mr. Arkadin (1955).

== Early life ==
Medina was born on 19 July 1919 in Liverpool, England, as the daughter of Laureano Ramón Medina Nebot, a Spanish lawyer and opera singer from the Canary Islands, and an English mother, Edith May Strode. Patricia had two sisters, Pepita "Piti" and Gloria Nebot. Born in Liverpool, her sisters and she grew up at a mansion in Stanmore. Medina began acting as a teenager in the late 1930s, and worked her way up to leading roles in the mid-1940s, when she left London for Hollywood.

== Career ==
In the 1950s Fortunes of Captain Blood, she teamed with British actor Louis Hayward. They subsequently appeared together in 1951's The Lady and the Bandit, Lady in the Iron Mask, and Captain Pirate from 1952.

Medina was often typecast in period melodramas such as The Black Knight. Two of her films were William Witney's Stranger at My Door and Orson Welles' Mr. Arkadin, based on episodes of the radio series The Adventures of Harry Lime, itself derived from The Third Man film.

Although prolific during the early 1950s, her film career faded by the end of the decade. In 1958, she performed in four episodes as Margarita Cortazar on Walt Disney's ABC series Zorro. In 1958, she also appeared as "The Lady" Diana Coulter in Richard Boone's CBS Western series Have Gun – Will Travel. She was then cast in an episode of Darren McGavin's NBC Western series Riverboat. In 1960, she was cast as different characters in two episodes ("Fair Game" and "The Earl of Durango") of the ABC Western series The Rebel. Medina also made television appearances on Perry Mason ("The Case of the Lucky Loser", 27 September 1958); Bonanza ("The Spanish Grant", 6 February 1960), Thriller ("The Premature Burial", 1961), The Alfred Hitchcock Hour ("See the Monkey Dance", 9 November 1964) and The Man from U.N.C.L.E ("The Foxes and Hounds Affair", 8 October 1965).

Medina guest starred as Ruthanne Harper in "Incident of the Boomerang" in 1961 and as Ilona Calvin in "Incident at Jacob's Well" in 1959, on Rawhide. She guest-starred in the Branded episode "Yellow for Courage" in 1966 and the Burke's Law episode "Don Pablo" in 1964.

In 1968, she returned to the big screen in The Killing of Sister George, Robert Aldrich's adaptation of the lesbian-themed drama of the same name.

== Autobiography ==
In 1998, she published an autobiography, Laid Back in Hollywood.

== Personal life ==
Medina married British actor Richard Greene on 24 December 1941, in St. James's Church, Spanish Place, London; they divorced in 1951. Medina married actor Joseph Cotten on 20 October 1960, in Beverly Hills at the home of David O. Selznick and Jennifer Jones. Cotten and she bought an historic 1935 home in the Mesa neighborhood of Palm Springs, California, where they lived from 1985 to 1992. No children were born from either marriage.

=== Death ===
Medina died at age 92 on 28 April 2012, from natural causes at the Barlow Respiratory Hospital in Los Angeles, California.

She was interred at Blandford Cemetery in Petersburg, Virginia, beside the remains of her husband, Cotten.

== Filmography ==
- Dinner at the Ritz (1937) – (uncredited)
- Mr. Satan (1938) – A Girl
- Simply Terrific (1938) – Heather Carfax
- Double or Quits (1938) – Caroline
- This Man Is News (1938) – Waitress in teashop (uncredited)
- Crook's Tour (1941) – Hotel Receptionist (uncredited)
- The Day Will Dawn (1942) – Ingrid
- The First of the Few (1942) – Venetian Girl (uncredited)
- They Met in the Dark (1943) – Mary – Manicurist
- Hotel Reserve (1944) – Odette Roux
- Don't Take It to Heart (1944) – Mary
- Kiss the Bride Goodbye (1945) – Joan Dodd
- Waltz Time (1945) – Cenci Prohaska
- The Secret Heart (1946) – Kay Burns; first American role
- The Beginning or the End (1947) – Mrs. Wyatt (uncredited)
- Moss Rose (1947) – Audrey Ashton
- The Foxes of Harrow (1947) – Desiree
- The Three Musketeers (1948) – Kitty
- The Fighting O'Flynn (1949, opposite then husband, Richard Greene) – Fancy Free
- Children of Chance (1949) – Agostina
- Francis (1950) – Maureen Gelder
- Fortunes of Captain Blood (1950) – Isabelita Sotomayor
- Abbott and Costello in the Foreign Legion (1950) – Nicole Dupre
- The Jackpot (1950) – Hildegarde Jonet / Hilda Jones
- Valentino (1951) – Lila Reyes
- The Lady and the Bandit (1951) – Joyce Greene
- The Magic Carpet (1951) – Lida
- Aladdin and His Lamp (1952) – Princess Jasmine
- Lady in the Iron Mask (1952) – Princess Anne / Princess Louise
- Captain Pirate (1952) – Dona Isabella
- Desperate Search (1952) – Nora Stead
- Botany Bay (1952) – Sally Munroe
- Siren of Bagdad (1953) – Princess Zendi
- Sangaree (1953) – Martha Darby
- Plunder of the Sun (1953) – Anna Luz
- Phantom of the Rue Morgue (1954) – Jeanette
- Drums of Tahiti (1954) – Wanda Spence
- The Black Knight (1954) – Linet
- Pirates of Tripoli (1955) – Princess Karjan
- Mr. Arkadin (1955) – Mily
- Duel on the Mississippi (1955) – Lili Scarlet
- The Red Cloak (1955) – Laura Lanfranchi
- Uranium Boom (1956) – Jean Williams
- Stranger at My Door (1956) – Peg Jarret
- The Beast of Hollow Mountain (1956) – Sarita
- Miami Exposé (1956) – Lila Hodges
- The Buckskin Lady (1957) – Angela Medley
- Battle of the V-1 (1958) – Zofia
- Count Your Blessings (1959) – Albertine
- Snow White and the Three Stooges (1961) – Queen / Witch / Gypsy Matilda
- The Killing of Sister George (1968) – Betty Thaxter
- Latitude Zero (1969) – Lucretia
- Keene (1969)
- Timber Tramps (1975) – Miami Lills
- El llanto de los pobres (1978) – (final film role)

== Selected television roles ==
- Tales of the 77th Bengal Lancers (1956)
- Zorro (1957)
- The Californians in episode "Lola Montez" (NBC-TV, 1958) – Lola Montez
- Perry Mason in “The Case of the Lucky Loser” (1958) – Harriet Balfour
- Rawhide (CBS-TV, 1960)
- Bonanza (1960) – Isabella Maria Ynez Y Castro De La Cuesta / Rosita Morales in the episode The Spanish Grant
- The Rebel in episode "Fair Game" (1960) - Cynthia
- Thriller (NBC-TV, 1961; 2 episodes) – Victorine Lafourcade / Nadja
- Have Gun – Will Travel (1957–1963) – Diana Coulter / Sabina – Unforgiving Minute /
- Rawhide (1961) – Ruthanne Harper in S3:E20, "Incident of the Boomerang"
- The Alfred Hitchcock Hour (1964) – Wife, S3:E5, "See the Monkey Dance"
- The Man from U.N.C.L.E. (1965) – Lucia Belmont
- Branded (NBC-TV, 1966) – Dr. Karen L. Miller
