= Fortunes of Captain Blood =

1950 film by Gordon Douglas

- Theatrical release poster
- Directed by: Gordon Douglas
- Screenplay by: Michael Hogan; Robert Libott; Frank Burt
- Based on: Captain Blood, His Odyssey; 1922 novel by Rafael Sabatini
- Produced by: Harry Joe Brown
- Starring: Louis Hayward
- Cinematography: George E. Diskant
- Edited by: Gene Havlick
- Music by: Paul Sawtell
- Production company: Columbia Pictures
- Distributed by: Columbia Pictures
- Release dates: May 14, 1950 (Los Angeles); June 9, 1950 (New York)
- Running time: 90 minutes
- Country: United States
- Language: English

Fortunes of Captain Blood is a 1950 Columbia Pictures pirate film directed by Gordon Douglas. It is based on the character of Captain Blood as depicted in the original 1922 novel and subsequent collections of stories written by Rafael Sabatini. The film spawned a sequel with the same cast and crew two years later entitled Captain Pirate.

== Plot ==
Dr. Peter Blood is arrested and sentenced to slavery for his treatment of a wounded rebel during the Monmouth Rebellion. With a group of fellow prisoners, he escapes and becomes a feared buccaneer on the high seas. King Charles II of Spain summons the Marquis de Riconete, the governor of Rio de La Hacha, to capture Captain Blood and end his attacks upon Spanish ships.

Blood is safe until he tries to resupply his ship. When a party of his men go ashore, they are betrayed by their supplier and captured by the human trafficker George Fairfax, who sells them to the marquis. After restocking and rearming at Tortuga, Blood secretly returns to La Hacha disguised as a fruit seller to find and rescue his loyal crew, who even while being tortured by the marquis, have refused to reveal the location of their captain. During his search, he befriends Pepita Rosados, a beautiful flirt who reveals to Blood that many of Fairfax's prisoners are dying. Blood then confronts Fairfax about the deplorable situation and finds that Fairfax is having troubles with Isabelita Sotomayor, the niece of the marquis. The marquis then decides to arrest Fairfax for his supposed involvement with Blood, so his troops secretly follow Isabelita to his house. She pleads with Fairfax to alleviate her boredom with the island, offering him money to carry her to Spain. After their discussion, the troops enter and a fight ensues.

Still disguised as a fruit seller, Blood treats the wounded Fairfax in a nearby tavern and offers Isabelita passage to Spain if she will convince her uncle to pardon Fairfax. She agrees, and using his newfound insider information, Blood discovers the seal of the marquis. He mistakes the forgery and, after revealing his mistaken note to the prison guard, a battle ensues. Blood and his men escape, but the marquis is unwilling to abandon his search.

Isabelita is shocked to discover that her uncle plans to torture the local tavern owner to find the captain, so she reveals Blood's location, thinking that he has already set sail. The incoming tide has prevented Blood's escape, and the marquis confronts him at sea. A fiery battle ensues, with the flaming ship of the marquis trying to ram Captain Blood. Blood and his crew manage to destroy the vessel before the flames reach them. After the pirates' victory, Blood sails away and Isabelita vows to stay on the island and create a new government without slave labor.

== Cast ==
- Louis Hayward as Capt. Peter Blood
- Patricia Medina as Isabelita Sotomayor
- George Macready as Marquis de Riconete
- Alfonso Bedoya as Carmillo
- Dona Drake as Pepita Maria Rosados
- Lowell Gilmore as George Fairfax
- Wilton Graff as Capt. Alvarado
- Curt Bois as King Charles ΙΙ
- Lumsden Hare as Tom Mannering
- Billy Bevan as Billy Bragg (as William Bevan)
- Harry Cording as Will Ward
- Duke York as Andrew Hardy
- Sven Hugo Borg as Swede
- Martin Garralaga as Antonio Viamonte
- James Fairfax as Nat Russell
- Charles Irwin as Smitty
- Terry Kilburn as Kenny Jensen
- Alberto Morin as Miguel Gonzales (as Albert Morin)
- Nick Volpe as Papa Rosados

== Production ==
The film is based on the book The Fortunes of Captain Blood, a collection of six stories by Rafael Sabatini published in 1936, the year after the release of the 1935 film Captain Blood, starring Errol Flynn.

In July 1949, Columbia Pictures announced the film project, to be produced by Harry Joe Brown. Louis Hayward was linked to the project that same month.

Filming was intended to start on October 1, 1949, with H. Bruce Humberstone as director, but production was delayed. On October 21, Gordon Douglas replaced Humberstone, and filming began in November.

== Reception ==
In a contemporary review for The New York Times, critic Thomas M. Pryor wrote: "The Columbia Pictures people should hang their heads in shame for having made such a listless picture out of the Rafael Sabatini yarn, 'Fortunes of Captain Blood.' Even with Louis Hayward. that eminent swordsman, flashing a keen blade as he runs through a whole troop of His Spanish Majesty's guard, the new film ... just barely manages to stagger along. Such inertia is unpardonable in a script compounded of piracy, intrigue, romance, torture and a crusade for social justice."

The Los Angeles Times wrote: "To the delight of small boys, some big ones, and maybe a lot of gals, too, there's not a moment when Capt. Blood is really safe in 'Fortunes of Captain Blood' ... Indeed, so fast is the action that if one so much as reaches down to loosen one's shoe, a thread of the plot goes snap."
