= Criminal court =

Criminal court may refer to:

- A court that tries offenses against criminal law
- Criminal justice
- Criminal Court (film), a 1946 American film.

== See also ==
- Cour d'assises, France
- Court of assizes (Belgium)
