= Fugitive Lady (1934 film) =

1934 film directed by Albert S. Rogell

- Directed by: Albert S. Rogell
- Written by: Herbert Asbury
- Produced by: Sid Rogell
- Starring: Florence Rice; Neil Hamilton; Donald Cook
- Cinematography: Allen G. Siegler
- Edited by: John Rawlins
- Production company: Columbia Pictures
- Distributed by: Columbia Pictures
- Release date: December 10, 1934
- Running time: 66 minutes
- Country: United States
- Language: English

Fugitive Lady is an American 1934 film directed by Albert S. Rogell and starring Florence Rice, Neil Hamilton and Donald Cook. Lucille Ball had an uncredited role in the film.

== Cast ==
- Florence Rice as Ann Duncan
- Neil Hamilton as Donald Brooks
- Donald Cook as Jack Howard
- William Demarest as Steve Rogers
- Clara Blandick as Aunt Margaret
- Nella Walker as Mrs Brooks
- Rita La Roy as Sylvia Brooks
