= Bodyguard (1948 film) =

1948 American semi-documentary crime film noir directed by Richard Fleischer

- Theatrical release poster
- Directed by: Richard Fleischer
- Screenplay by: Fred Niblo Jr.; Harry Essex
- Story by: George W. George; Robert Altman
- Produced by: Sid Rogell
- Starring: Lawrence Tierney; Priscilla Lane
- Cinematography: Robert De Grasse
- Edited by: Elmo Williams
- Music by: Paul Sawtell
- Distributed by: RKO Radio Pictures
- Release date: September 2, 1948 (United States)
- Running time: 62 minutes
- Country: United States
- Language: English

Bodyguard is a 1948 American film noir directed by Richard Fleischer and written by Fred Niblo Jr. and Harry Essex, based on a story by George W. George and Robert Altman. The drama features Lawrence Tierney and, in her final screen appearance, Priscilla Lane.

== Plot ==
After being put on suspension at the LAPD, Mike Carter punches Lieutenant Broden and quits in disgust. A few days later, at a baseball game, he is approached by Fred Dysen, who wants to hire Carter as a bodyguard for his aunt, Gene Dysen, a widow and head of Continental Meat Packing Corp. Carter refuses. Later, at his apartment, an envelope is slipped under the door with $2000 in it. Carter rushes out, but the person who left it is already gone.

Carson drives to the Dysen mansion in Pasadena, where he pushes his way in and, after meeting the members of the household, finds Mrs. Dysen is uninterested in having a bodyguard. Carter returns the money to Fred, but just as he is leaving, someone shoots at Mrs. Dysen but gets away. After she goes to bed, Fred convinces Carter to stay, just for the night, and Carter takes back the money.

At 3:45 am, Carter catches Mrs. Dysen's secretary, Connie Fenton, digging the bullets out of the wall, then sees Mrs. Dysen drive away. He follows her car to the Downtown Los Angeles warehouse district, where he is hit on the head, waking up later in his car, with Lieutenant Borden shot dead beside him, on the railroad tracks with a train bearing down. Carter barely gets out in time.

Realizing he is being framed for Lieutenant Borden's murder, he asks his fiancée, Doris Brewster, who is Lieutenant Borden's secretary, to find out all she can about the cases Lieutenant Borden was working on. She drives him to the Dysen home; finding Mrs. Dysen not at home he goes to the plant but she is not there either.

In the info on Lieutenant Borden's cases, one item stands out, the death of inspector Alex Stone at the Continental Meat Packing plant. Back at the Dysen mansion, Carter confronts Mrs. Dysen about her movements that morning. After she gives him a plausible explanation, he calls Doris and asks her to bring him more information on Stone's death. He then talks to the dead man's brother Adam, who recognizes Carter as being wanted by the police. Carter discovers evidence that Stone's sight was not as faulty as claimed in the accident report.

Narrowly avoiding arrest and checking out the testimony of optometrist Dr. Briller at his office, Carter next tries to find information at the glasses manufacturer; it's after hours so he breaks in. Finding the information he needs, he calls Captain Wayne and tells him to meet him at the Dysen home. Meanwhile, at the plant, where she went despite Carter telling her not to, Doris spies on Fred and Fenton, the supervisor.

At the mansion, Carter confronts Mrs. Dysen, who reveals that Freddie thinks Fenton has been adding water to the meat to increase its price and pocketing the difference. Stone was murdered to cover it up. Carter tells her he believes Fred is in with Fenton on the fraud. Discovering Doris is in danger at the plant, Carter steals the police car and heads to the plant.

At the plant, Fred, reveals how he will frame Fenton for the deaths and exonerate himself, with Fenton dead. Carter arrives just as Fred is about to shoot Doris and, after Fred runs out of bullets, fights with and knocks out Fred. The police arrive and take both Carter and Fred into custody. The next scene shows the newlywed Mr. & Mrs. Mike Carter heading off for their honeymoon in a police cruiser.

== Cast ==
- Lawrence Tierney as Michael C. "Mike" Carter
- Priscilla Lane as Doris Brewster
- Phillip Reed as Freddie Dysen
- June Clayworth as Connie Fenton
- Elisabeth Risdon as Gene Dysen
- Steve Brodie as Fenton
- Frank Fenton as Lieutenant Borden
- Charles Cane as Capt. Wayne
- Pepe Hern as Pachuco
- Erville Alderson as Adam Stone
- Charles Wagenheim as Dr. Briller

== Critical reception ==
Brian Baxter of The Guardian identified Bodyguard as one of Richard Fleischer's early RKO films that has stood the test of time. Michael Barrett of PopMatters rated it 6/10 and called it "a trim little B film that’s an unpolished gem of late-'40s noir".
