= The Girl Friend (film) =

1935 film

- Directed by: Edward Buzzell
- Written by: Gene Towne; C. Graham Baker; Gertrude Purcell; Benny Rubin
- Produced by: Samuel J. Briskin
- Starring: Ann Sothern; Jack Haley; Roger Pryor
- Cinematography: Joseph Walker
- Edited by: John Rawlins
- Music by: Louis Silvers
- Production company: Columbia Pictures
- Distributed by: Columbia Pictures
- Release date: September 28, 1935
- Running time: 67 minutes
- Country: United States
- Language: English

The Girl Friend is a 1935 American musical comedy film directed by Edward Buzzell and starring Ann Sothern, Jack Haley and Roger Pryor.

== Main cast ==
- Ann Sothern as Linda Henry
- Jack Haley as Henry A. Henry
- Roger Pryor as George Thorne
- Thurston Hall as George S. Harmon
- Victor Kilian as Sunshine Minton
- Ray Walker as Doc Parks
- Inez Courtney as Hilda
- Margaret Seddon as Grandma Henry
- Lillian Rich as English Lady
- Buddy Roosevelt as Chauffeur
- Marie Wilson as Chorus Girl in Play
- Dennis O'Keefe as Soldier in Play

== In popular culture ==
The movie poster for this film appears in the Three Stooges short Even as IOU on the wall in the building they are squatting in.

== Bibliography ==
- Monaco, James. The Encyclopedia of Film. Perigee Books, 1991.
