= Death Flies East =

1935 film by Phil Rosen

- Film poster
- Directed by: Phil Rosen
- Written by: Albert DeMond; Fred Niblo Jr.; Philip Wylie
- Produced by: Sid Rogell
- Starring: Conrad Nagel; Florence Rice; Raymond Walburn
- Cinematography: Allen G. Siegler
- Edited by: John Rawlins
- Production company: Columbia Pictures
- Distributed by: Columbia Pictures
- Release date: February 28, 1935
- Running time: 65 minutes
- Country: United States
- Language: English

Death Flies East is a 1935 American mystery film directed by Phil Rosen and starring Conrad Nagel, Florence Rice and Raymond Walburn. The action takes place on an airline flight with a murderer aboard. The film was an early example of the aviation "disaster film" genre.

== Plot ==
On a transcontinental flight from California to New York, a police detective (Fred Kelsey), found slumped in his seat is, dead, poisoned. The passengers include Evelyn Vail (Florence Rice), a nurse on parole for a murder she did not commit. The victim had also died of poisoning. The elderly doctor she worked for is still in prison. Evelyn is attempting to clear her name and bring the real killer to trial, a convict on death row at Sing Sing who can confess to the killing, if only she can get there in time.

Another passenger is John Robinson Gordon (Conrad Nagel), a college instructor who becomes involved in Evelyn's plight. He is carrying a secret armament formula to deliver to the Secretary of the Navy in Washington, D.C. He protects the valuable secret formula, clutching a briefcase at all times. John begins to suspect Evelyn but other passengers appear suspicious; who, among the other passengers, is the real murderer?

== Cast ==
- Conrad Nagel as John Robinson Gordon
- Florence Rice as Evelyn Vail
- Raymond Walburn as Evans
- Geneva Mitchell as Helen Gilbert
- Robert Allen as Baker
- Oscar Apfel as Wallace P. Burroughs
- Miki Morita as Satu
- Purnell Pratt as Dr. Landers
- Irene Franklin as Mrs. Laura Madison
- George Irving as Dr. Jim Moffat
- Adrian Rosley as Pastoli
- Fred Kelsey as Police Lieutenant O'Brien
- George "Gabby" Hayes as Wotkyns

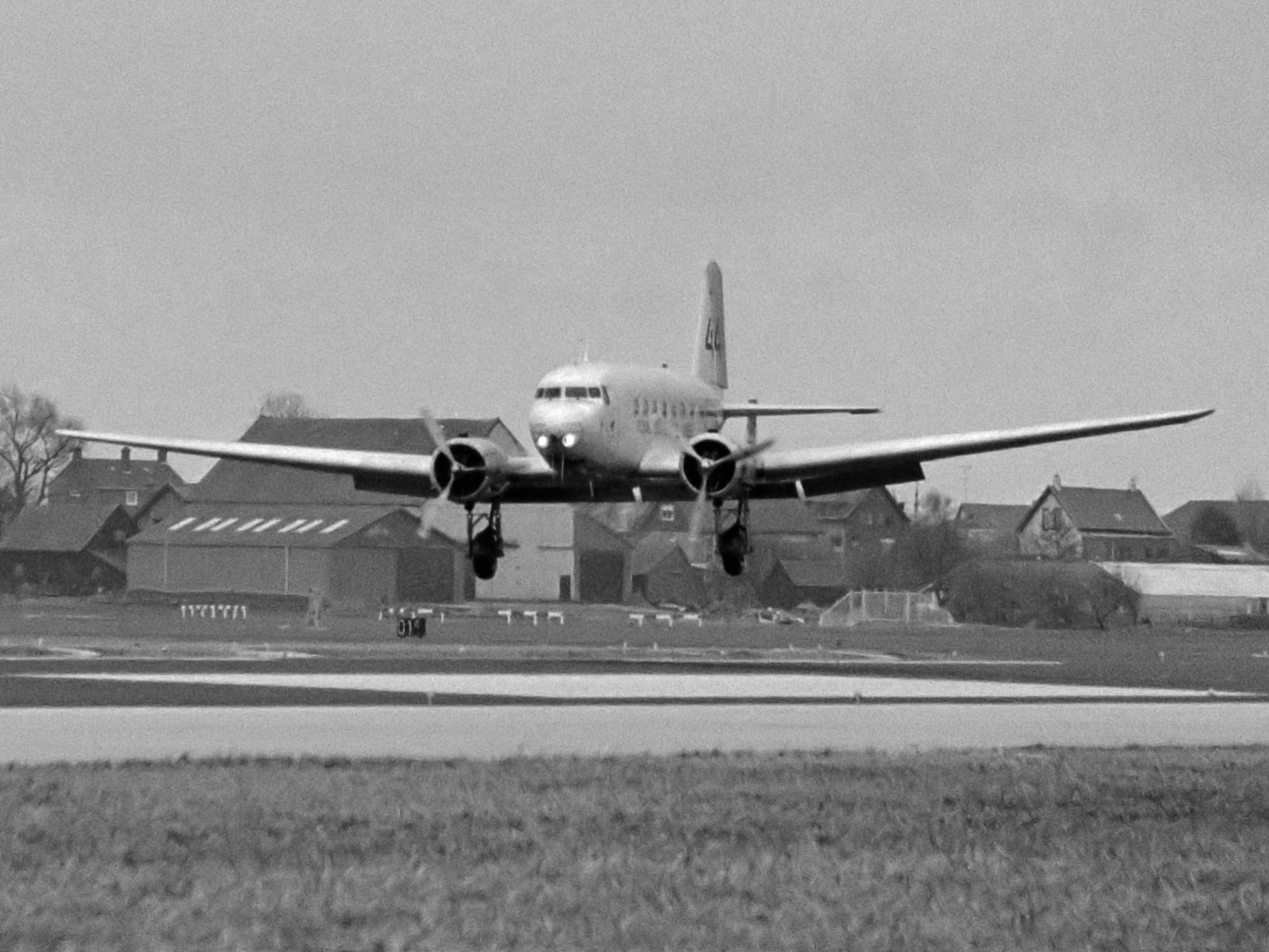
Douglas DC-2

== Production ==
Principal photography on Death Flies East took place from December 27, 1934, to January 15, 1935. American Airlines loaned a Douglas DC-2 airliner that was featured in . Interiors and flight-deck scenes, however, were shot in a studio using a mock-up. (Note: The Douglas DC-2-120 s/n 1316 (NC14283) was delivered in December 1934, later sold to Indian Airlines and eventually used by the RAF as DG470.)

== Reception ==
Aviation historian Michael Paris equated Death Flies East as a progenitor of the "disaster film". He wrote, "... the stereotyped collection of passengers, essential in the disaster movie, were first created in the 1930s in films such as Thirteen Hours by Air and Death Flies East.
