= Gorella Gori =

Italian stage and film actress

- Born: Zaira Erba; 2 February 1900; Rome, Kingdom of Italy
- Died: 25 November 1963 (aged 63); Rome, Italy
- Occupation: Actress
- Years active: 1935–1958 (film)

Gorella Gori (2 February 1900 – 25 November 1963) was an Italian entertainer (including cafe-chantant), stage actor and film actress. She appeared in twenty five films, generally in supporting or minor roles. One of her later roles was a small part in Roman Holiday (1953).

== Partial filmography ==
- In the Country Fell a Star (1939) - La moglie de Teodorico
- Big Shoes (1940) - Concetta, la cuoca
- Lucky Night (1941)
- La compagnia della teppa (1941) - La signora Borghi
- Street of the Five Moons (1942) - La comare grassottella
- Perdizione (1942) - Amalia, l'infermiera
- The Gorgon (1942) - Berta
- The Peddler and the Lady (1943) - La cameriera della casa Giovannini
- Annabella's Adventure (1943)
- La storia di una capinera (1943)
- The Priest's Hat (1944) - Chiarina
- Il vento m'ha cantato una canzone (1947)
- Il nido di Falasco (1950)
- Never Take No for an Answer (1951) - Weaver's Wife
- Toto and the King of Rome (1952)
- Roman Holiday (1953) - Shoe Seller
- Disonorata - Senza colpa (1954)
- Angela (1954) - Nurse
- Oh! Sabella (1957)
- Una pelliccia di visone (1957)

== Bibliography ==
- Pirolini, Alessandro. The Cinema of Preston Sturges: A Critical Study. McFarland, 2010.
