= Married Before Breakfast =

1937 film by Edwin L. Marin

- Directed by: Edwin L. Marin
- Written by: George Oppenheimer; Everett Freeman; Harry Ruskin
- Produced by: Sam Zimbalist
- Starring: Robert Young; Florence Rice; June Clayworth
- Cinematography: Leonard Smith
- Edited by: William S. Gray
- Music by: David Snell
- Production company: Metro-Goldwyn-Mayer
- Distributed by: Loew's Inc.
- Release date: June 18, 1937
- Running time: 71 minutes
- Country: United States
- Language: English
- Budget: $200,000
- Box office: $448,000

Married Before Breakfast is a 1937 American romantic comedy film directed by Edwin L. Marin and starring Robert Young, Florence Rice and June Clayworth.

== Plot ==
After years of struggling, inventor Tom Wakefield sells his hair-removal invention for a quarter of a million dollars. He immediately goes on a spending spree, doing good deeds for friends and strangers alike, worrying June Baylin, his fiancée.

Kitty Brent helps him with some steamship tickets, so Tom wants to do something nice in return. Kitty says her marriage to fiancé Kenneth is on hold until he can sell an insurance policy to a milkman named Baglipp. An overly optimistic Tom assures her she'll be married by the next morning. His schemes to make Baglipp take the policy ends up getting Tom and Kitty into all kinds of trouble, including involvement with a robbery.

By morning, both their sweethearts are exasperated. June breaks off her engagement with Tom, who realizes that overnight he's fallen for Kitty. As soon as she begins feeling the same way, Tom assures her that she might end up married this very day.

== Cast ==
- Robert Young as Tom Wakefield
- Florence Rice as Kitty Brent
- June Clayworth as June Baylin
- Barnett Parker as Tweed
- Warren Hymer as Harry
- Helen Flint as Miss Fleeter
- Irene Franklin as Mrs. Baglipp
- Hugh Marlowe as Kenneth
- Tom Kennedy as Mr. Baglipp
- Edgar Dearing as Police Sergeant

== Reception ==
According to MGM records the movie earned $319,000 in the US and Canada and $129,000 elsewhere, resulting in a profit of $90,000.
