= Sworn Enemy (film) =

1936 film by Edwin L. Marin

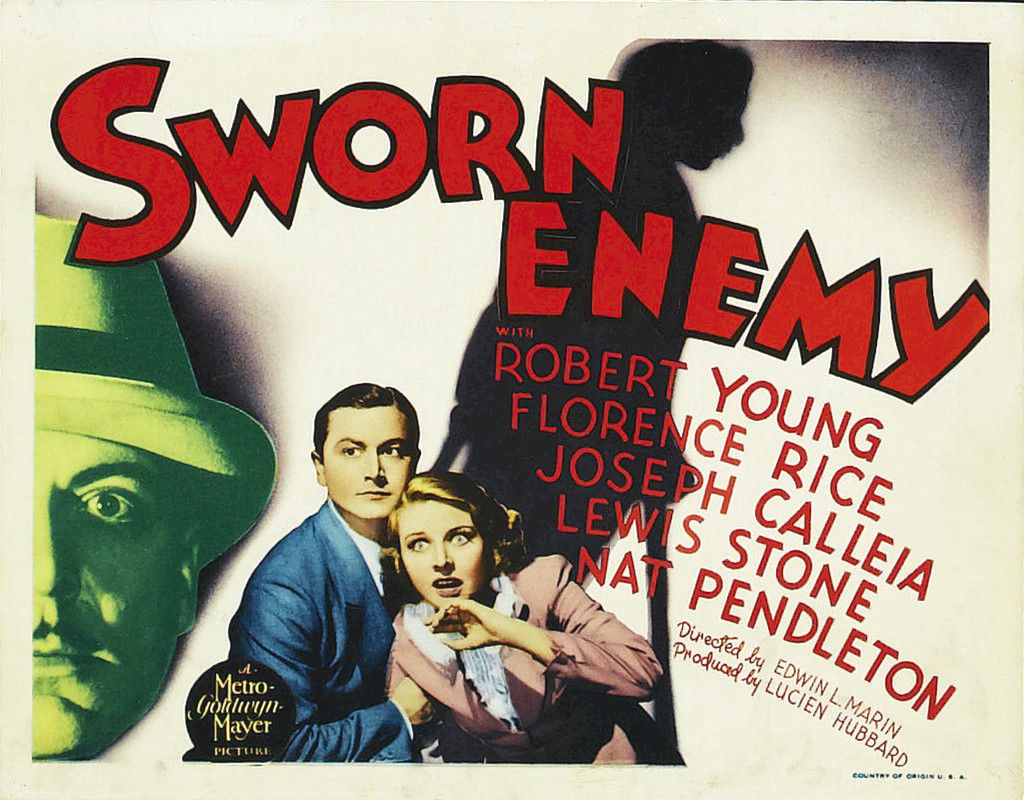
- Theatrical release poster
- Directed by: Edwin L. Marin
- Screenplay by: Wells Root
- Based on: It's All in the Racket by Richard Wormser
- Produced by: Lucien Hubbard
- Starring: Robert Young; Florence Rice; Joseph Calleia; Lewis Stone; Nat Pendleton
- Cinematography: Lester White
- Edited by: Frank E. Hull
- Music by: Edward Ward
- Production company: Metro-Goldwyn-Mayer
- Distributed by: Metro-Goldwyn-Mayer
- Release date: September 11, 1936
- Running time: 73 minutes
- Country: United States
- Language: English

Sworn Enemy is a 1936 American crime film directed by Edwin L. Marin, written by Wells Root, and starring Robert Young, Florence Rice, Joseph Calleia, Lewis Stone, and Nat Pendleton. It was released on September 11, 1936, by Metro-Goldwyn-Mayer.

== Plot ==
Henry “Hank” Sherman (Robert Young) is a young man searching for employment near a dock in New York. A policeman tells him Eli Decker owns a large business that extends for five blocks and asks Hank what he would prefer to lift: vegetables, chicken, or fish. Hank replies, “Vegetables,” because “they smell better.” In spite of a “No Help Wanted” sign in Eli Decker’s Market Corporation, Hank persuades the foreman, Mike, to give him a job unloading vegetables. After Hank punches out on the time clock, two men demand $10 a month to join their “protection association.” When Hank resists, the men start beating him up on the ground outside the building. An upper-class car approaches and stops, driven by Bergin (Norman Ainsley), with two passengers—a man in a business suit and hat, accompanied by a younger woman. The older man tells Bergin to get out to assist Hank, but Bergin demurs, stating the assailants are the same ones who beat him up the week before. The older man tells Bergin he is fired and gets out of the car with the young woman. The two attackers leave, and the man and woman help Hank to stand up, asking him what started the altercation. Hank explains how the “protection association” won’t let him work without paying, and the man introduces himself as Eli Decker (Samuel Hinds). Eli tells Hank he is fed up with thugs who demand “protection” money from businesses. He asks about Hank’s background: he was studying in law school until his brother’s support ran out and is now looking for a job. Eli offers Hank a chauffeur job driving as for $100 a month. Hank accepts, and Eli introduces the pretty, young woman as his secretary. Since Hank has trouble figuring out the switches and gears, Eli tells him to get out of the car. The two men change places, and Hank tries to impress Eli’s secretary (Peg Gattle, played by Florence Rice) by asking her to Coney Island.

A little later, Hank drives Peg to Sing Sing prison, unaware she is going to pick up her father, Dr. Simon Gattle (Lewis Stone). Hank stops the car to order lunch, but Peg is anxious to arrive at the prison. Hank proposes marriage to Peg, who smiles but says he needs to finish his law degree. After picking up Dr. Gattle and returning home, Peg tells Hank her father served twelve years in prison for something he didn’t do.

Boxer Steamer Krupp (Nat Pendleton) jogs by Hank, followed by his manager, Steve (Leslie Fenton), who is Hank’s brother. Steve says his fighter will bring enough money in that Hank can soon stop working in his chauffeur “monkey suit.” Hank says he is supporting himself now, and Steve borrows five dollars. Steve wonders if Hank’s boss, Eli Decker, can get a fight lined up for his boxer, as Dutch McTurck (Edward Pawley) tells Hank he has something to tell him and to bring his brother.

Meanwhile, Eli Decker and Special District Attorney Paul Scott (Harvey Stephens) talk to Dr. Gattle and Peg. Dr. Gattle says he listened to other men talk for twelve years and has determined that Joe Emerald is responsible for his prison sentence. Decker and Scott are surprised, because Emerald is considered a “cripple, a gambler” who is involved with horse racing and backing fighters, but with a strong reputation for supposedly being honest. Dr. Gattle states he has enough evidence to prove Emerald is the boss of every racket in the city.

Dutch McTurck warns Steve and Hank that with the news of the investigation into the city’s criminal rackets, Hank is working for the wrong man. Steve protests and says Hank is just working for Eli Decker so that Decker can get a fight lined up for Steamer.

Dr. Gattle tells the other men that the reason Joe Emerald has been impossible to convict on any charges is because he operates with cash only, with a vault “somewhere.” Hank comes in to warn Eli Decker that the criminal element is now out to get him and offers to be his bodyguard. Decker tells Hank to keep studying his law books. Outside Steve convinces Decker to get a fight lined up at the Garden, and the two ride in the back seat of the car. But when the car arrives at Decker’s destination, two men climb up into a backhoe. Another car cuts off Hank, so he is unable to go forward, and the heavy backhoe bucket drops on Decker’s car, fatally crushing both Decker and Steve inside. Steve dies in his brother’s arms. At the cemetery Dutch offers to buy Hank a drink, but inside the bar Hank just sits sadly. Later Dutch says he is getting promoted by his boss and says Hank can get a job with him. But Hank first becomes an investigator under Paul Scott, taking the oath of his office with Peg and Dr. Gattle watching on. Scott tells Hank to be sure to get records of what the top crime boss is doing, whether it is Emerald or not.

The job Dutch has for Hank starts out with being his bodyguard. Hank is told to alert other protection racket enforcers that the cops are nearby, just as they start to purposely contaminate milk cans on railroad cars with castor oil because a dairyman wouldn’t pay up. Two criminals are shot and killed, and Hank is shot in the shoulder while hidden on top of another car. Hank makes his way down to the inside of the nearly-dark car, where Dutch tells him to get out. Hank just moves farther away from the door, when a policeman starts peering inside. Hank shoots Dutch to save the policeman from being shot by Dutch. The other racket men are suspicious that Hank claims not to know where Dutch is, because they know Dutch was found dead, and after all Hank was supposed to be the bodyguard.

Dr. Gattle receives a call from a former prison inmate, who warns him that Joe Emerald knows Dr. Gattle is trying to bring Emerald to justice. Dr. Gattle tells Peg not to answer the phone anymore, just as Hank tries to call. Dejected, Hank painfully makes his way to Peg and Dr. Gattle’s apartment and collapses outside their door. Peg tells her father she is sure it is Henry outside, so they open the door cautiously. Dr. Gattle removes the bullet and tells Hank he should leave before daylight, in case Joe Emerald’s men followed him. Hank confesses to Peg he killed Dutch McTurck, since he wanted to save the policeman. He also tells Peg he has grown older with the night’s events.

When Hank returns to his own apartment, he finds Steamer asleep on his bed. Steamer says he came to see Hank because he never fought without Steve’s supervision. He figures Hank might be smart like his brother and asks him to try being his manager. Hank at first is unwilling, but they agree everyone had good luck working with Steve. Hank says aloud that he is sure someone purposely got Steve (and Eli Decker) in that spot to be killed, which enrages Steamer. Hank calms Steamer down and decides to be his manager, as long as Steamer keeps winning, as he recalls the “top guy” he is after is also involved with boxing.

There are a couple of moments of humor, as Steamer mistakes a microphone for a receiver and speaks to someone named Fanny, then is mystified when there is no response, asking if someone handed him a tin ear. He also gets tangled up in the arena ropes and then punches one of the assistants who is trying to get him loose.

Some of the racket managers offer Hank a bill of sale for $10,000 to buy Steamer, but Hank refuses to do business with anyone but Joe Emerald. They threaten him with loss of life, so he signs the bill. But the very next fight Steamer gets beaten badly, and the racket managers lose at least $30,000. One manager slaps Steamer, who hauls off and punches him across the room. He labels Steamer a ‘dressing room fighter’ and arranges to have four muscular thugs beat him up with the door closed, as the racket managers stand outside and listen. But as Joe Emerald slowly walks with two canes to their location, everything is completely silent. The managers think Steamer has been subdued, but when the men enter the dressing room, all four hired thugs are unconscious, while Steamer is washing himself up. Joe Emerald tells Steamer he has a rematch, but Steamer says unless he is fighting for the Shermans (Hank’s family), who fed him when he was a kid, he isn’t motivated to win—unless he is up against killers like the four thugs he already knocked out. Emerald asks Steamer if he will fight if there is a Sherman in his corner, and Steamer happily agrees.

Hank stops to watch show-girls from the hotel balcony where Joe Emerald is waiting for him, which irritates Emerald. Emerald offers Hank his manager’s pay again if he will assist with Steamer in future fights. When Hank still hesitates, Joe Emerald explains that as a “cripple,” he has always wanted to own a champion, who is the strongest in the world. He takes Hank through his hotel suite, passing walls adorned with stylized figures of Greek athletes, which Emerald calls his “family.” Hank tells Joe Emerald he’ll help him if Joe will also get a job for his girl.

Peg is also sworn in as an investigator, and she is disguised to look like a cheap bar singer. Steamer tells Hank he ought to find someone better, but Hank declares she is okay. Peg pretends to get drunk and flirtatious after drinking champagne. Joe Emerald pushes her away, and the men go in the other room to talk business while Peg surreptitiously starts a fire. When the fire is big enough to notice, Hank says he smells something burning, and with the ensuring chaos, they notice Joe Emerald leave through the steam room. Hank deduces Emerald’s legendary vault is located in the steam room.

For the next fight with Steamer, the weather is predicted to be a heavy rainstorm. The event still begins. Hank is pleased, since he plans to locate the vault while the fight is on. Unbeknownst to Hank, Joe Emerald decides to go back to the hotel to escape the rain. With limited time to search, Hank persuades a taxi driver into exiting his cab to view a non-existent flat tire and takes off in the taxi himself. The rain forces everyone dancing at the hotel to find shelter indoors, but the band leader continues on.

Dr. Gattle shows up and asks his daughter, Peg, if she has the key. She shows it to him, and he gives her a flashlight to signal if there’s trouble. Dr. Gattle and another investigator, Simmons (Cy Kendall) tie up one of Joe Emerald’s men. They begin tapping on walls and looking for the vault in the steam room. Meanwhile, Hank arrives at the Metropolis Hotel in the “borrowed” taxi. Joe Emerald, his henchmen, and Steamer arrive only a minute after Hank. Steamer tries to distract Emerald from going upstairs so quickly by asking for a cup of coffee, but Joe Emerald tells Steamer to get warm with a rub and a bath. Steamer grabs Emerald and starts the elevator without his henchmen, but the men run upstairs and subdue Steamer, taking their boss toward the steam room. Dr. Gattle and Simmons locate and open the vault and are about to signal when Hank and Peg race upstairs to warn them.

Coming around the corner, Joe Emerald and his gang discover and untie their man. They see Gattle, Hank, Peg, and Simmons in the steam room through a small, rectangular window. Emerald is furious and shoots four times through the steam room door. No one is injured, so Emerald tells his men to relax, since the four people locked in the steam room are not cops. He turns the high steam knob on full-blast and smirks, “In about two minutes, it’ll be hot enough to boil eggs.” On the outside and alone, Steamer regains enough strength to try to break open the steam room to help his friends, but he fails and passes out again. Luckily, the four individuals escape the hot steam in that room by taking refuge in the vault itself. Then Hank says, “Wait a minute, I’ve got an idea.” In spite of the billowing steam, Simmons unwinds a length of detonating cord all the way to the first locked door. Hank runs out from the vault and unlocks the steam room door, so that it swings slowly open. Emerald discharges his gun twice, but with no response he is sure the four people have passed out by now. He turns the hot steam off and orders his men to drag the four out. But when the gang attempts to enter, one of the protagonists is shown detonating an explosion, which knocks the criminal gang to the ground. Lawmen with Special District Attorney Scott arrive in time to revive Steamer and find Emerald passed out on the floor, covered with small, white debris. Steamer asks Dr. Gattle where Hank is, and Dr. Gattle says Hank never came out of the vault. Dr. Gattle orders Simmons to open the vault, worried that Hank and Peg will suffocate. Simmons cannot do so. Steamer pushes forward to open the door, where the men see Hank and Peg locked in an embrace and happily kissing. Scott and Steamer laugh, while Dr. Gattle and Simmons smile, as Hank smiles and pulls the door shut again.

== Cast ==
- Robert Young as Henry 'Hank' Sherman
- Florence Rice as Margaret 'Peg' Gattle
- Joseph Calleia as Joe Emerald
- Lewis Stone as Doctor Simon 'Doc' Gattle
- Nat Pendleton as 'Steamer' Krupp
- Harvey Stephens as District Attorney Paul Scott
- Samuel S. Hinds as Eli Decker
- Edward Pawley as 'Dutch' McTurck
- John Wray as Lang
- Cy Kendall as Simmons
- Leslie Fenton as Steve Sherman
- Robert Gleckler as Hinkle
