= Strange Wives =

1934 film by Richard Thorpe

- Theatrical release poster
- Directed by: Richard Thorpe
- Screenplay by: James Mulhauser; Barry Trivers; Gladys Buchanan Unger
- Produced by: Stanley Bergerman
- Starring: Roger Pryor; June Clayworth; Esther Ralston; Hugh O'Connell; Ralph Forbes; Cesar Romero
- Cinematography: George Robinson
- Edited by: Edward Curtiss
- Music by: Edward Ward
- Production company: Universal Pictures
- Distributed by: Universal Pictures
- Release date: December 10, 1934
- Running time: 75 minutes
- Country: United States
- Language: English

Strange Wives is a 1934 American comedy film directed by Richard Thorpe, written by James Mulhauser, Barry Trivers, and Gladys Buchanan Unger, and starring Roger Pryor, June Clayworth, Esther Ralston, Hugh O'Connell, Ralph Forbes, and Cesar Romero. It was released on December 10, 1934, by Universal Pictures.

== Plot ==
Against his better judgment, stockbroker Jimmy King proposes marriage to a Russian refugee called Nadja, promptly complicating his life. He ends up supporting Nadja and all of her family, then must come up with a clever way of getting them all to be self-reliant and out of his house.

== Cast ==
- Roger Pryor as Jimmy King
- June Clayworth as Nadja
- Esther Ralston as Olga
- Hugh O'Connell as Warren
- Ralph Forbes as Paul
- Cesar Romero as Boris
- Francis L. Sullivan as Bellamy
- Valerie Hobson as Mauna
- Leslie Fenton as Svengaart
- Ivan Lebedeff as Dimitri
- Doris Lloyd as Mrs. Sleeper
- Claude Gillingwater as Guggins
- Carrie Daumery as The Princess
- Walter Walker as The General
- Greta Meyer as Hilda
- Harry Cording as Tribesman
- Buster Phelps as Twin
- Dickie Jones as Twin
- Phyllis Brooks as The Actress
- Leonid Snegoff as Head waiter
- Anne O'Neal as Jim's Secretary
- Robert Gordon as Elevator boy
- Neal Dodd as Minister
- Joseph Crehan as Immigration Official
- George Hackathorne as Guggin's Secretary
- Olaf Hytten as Jim's Butler
- Jean Fenwick as Jim's Secretary
- Nicholas Kobliansky as Waiter
- Victor De Linsky as Russian Priest
- Harry Cornell as Man
- Ralph Brooks as Chauffeur
