= The Kid from Texas (1939 film) =

1939 film by S. Sylvan Simon

- Directed by: S. Sylvan Simon
- Screenplay by: Florence Ryerson; Edgar Allan Woolf; Albert Mannheimer
- Story by: Milton Merlin; Byron Morgan
- Produced by: Edgar Selwyn
- Starring: Dennis O'Keefe; Florence Rice; Anthony Allan; Jessie Ralph; Buddy Ebsen
- Cinematography: Sidney Wagner
- Edited by: Fredrick Y. Smith
- Music by: William Axt
- Distributed by: Metro-Goldwyn-Mayer
- Release date: April 14, 1939
- Running time: 71 minutes
- Country: United States
- Language: English

The Kid from Texas is a 1939 Western sports comedy film.

== Plot ==
Margo Thomas, a lady of New York high society, travels to Texas with her brother to buy a new polo pony. When they choose cocky cowboy William Quincy's favorite horse, he asks to accompany them on the trip back East, and when easy-going ranch hand Snifty is chosen, instead, William goes along anyway.

William is happy that Margo's rich aunt Minetta takes a shine to him,and he develops a romantic attraction to Margo, who resents his arrogance and presence on the Long Island estate so much at first that she asks polo players to pick a fight with him. Trying to learn her favorite sport, William leaves the estate in shame after being thrown from a horse during a polo match.

He still loves the game, so Snifty and he begin a series of Wild West polo matches in the city, "cowboys against Indians", that become popular. William makes the acquaintance of Okay Kinney, a young rider who falls for him. Margo's brother's team ends up playing his, and after impressing her with his skill, William deliberately loses the match, just to please her.

== Cast ==
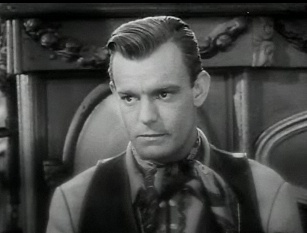
Dennis O'Keefe as William "Wild Bill" Malone

- Dennis O'Keefe as William "Wild Bill" Malone
- Florence Rice as Margo Thomas
- Buddy Ebsen as Snifty
- Jack Carson as Stanley Brown
- Virginia Dale as "Okay" Kinney
- Jessie Ralph as Aunt Minutia Thomas

== Production ==
Australian sports star Snowy Baker trained actor Dennis O'Keefe to play polo for the film.
