= I Like It That Way =

1934 film by Harry Lachman

- Directed by: Harry Lachman
- Written by: Joseph Santley; Harry Sauber; Chandler Sprague
- Produced by: Stanley Bergerman
- Starring: Gloria Stuart; Roger Pryor; Marian Marsh
- Cinematography: Charles J. Stumar
- Edited by: Milton Carruth
- Music by: Edward Ward
- Production company: Universal Pictures
- Distributed by: Universal Pictures
- Release date: April 1, 1934
- Running time: 67 minutes
- Country: United States
- Language: English

I Like It That Way is a 1934 American pre-Code musical film directed by Harry Lachman and starring Gloria Stuart, Roger Pryor and Marian Marsh.

== Plot ==
A telephone operator quits her job to become a singer at a nightclub.

== Cast ==
- Gloria Stuart as Anne Rogers
- Roger Pryor as Jack Anderson
- Marian Marsh as Joan Anderson
- Shirley Grey as Peggy
- Onslow Stevens as Harry Rogers
- Lucile Gleason as Mrs. Anderson
- Noel Madison as Jimmy Stuart
- Gloria Shea as Trixie
- Mae Busch as Elsie
- Merna Kennedy as Telephone Company Information Girl
- Mickey Rooney as Messenger Boy
- Clarence Wilson as The Professor
- Eddie Gribbon as Joe
- Virginia Sale as Old Maid
- Adrian Morris as Lothario in Chinese Restaurant

== Bibliography ==
- Clifford McCarty. Film Composers in America: A Filmography, 1911-1970. Oxford University Press, 2000.
