= Love Is a Headache =

1938 film by Richard Thorpe

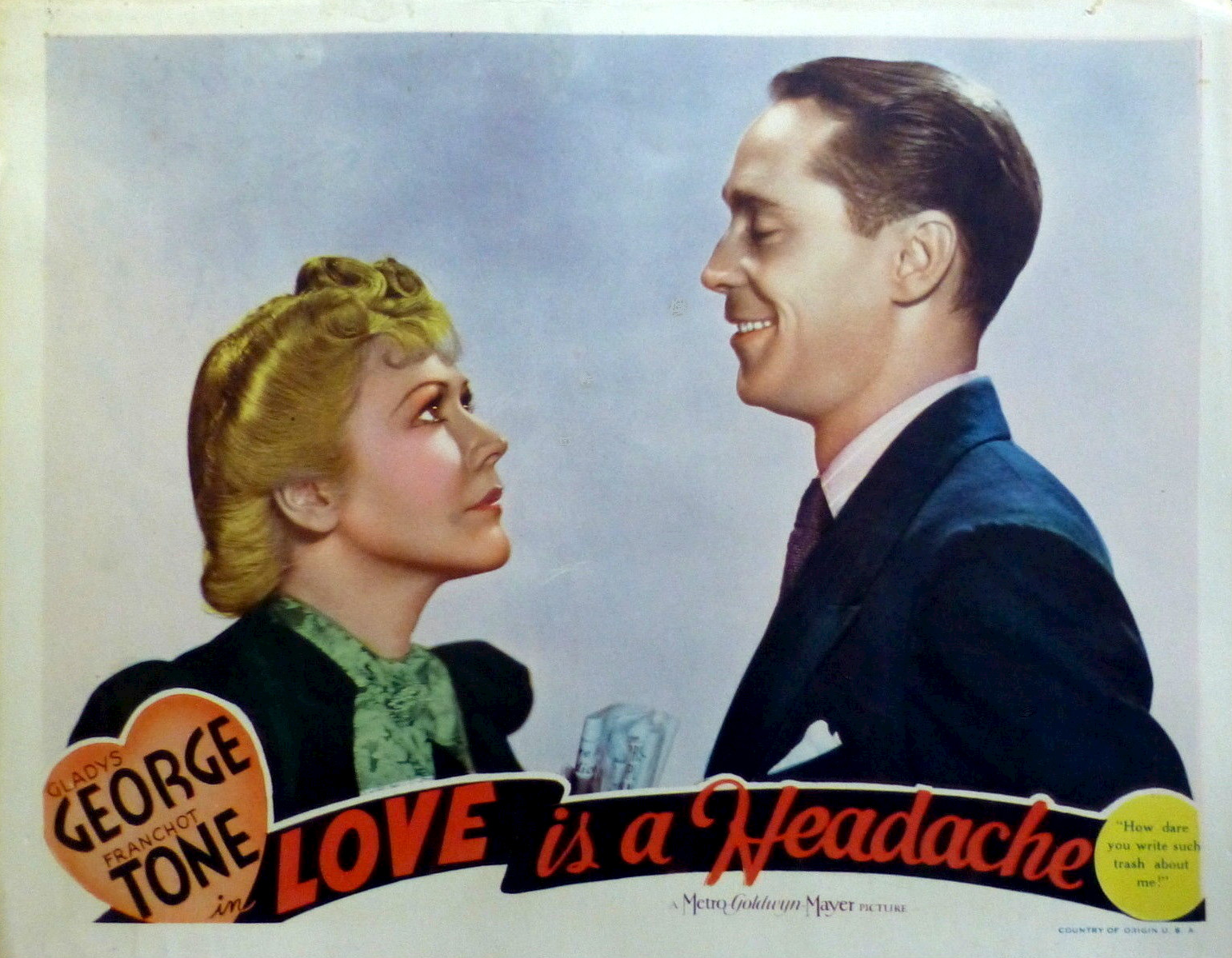
- Lobby card
- Directed by: Richard Thorpe
- Screenplay by: Marion Parsonnet; Harry Ruskin; William R. Lipman
- Story by: Louis E. Heifetz; Herbert Kline
- Produced by: Frederick Stephani
- Starring: Gladys George; Franchot Tone; Ted Healy; Mickey Rooney; Frank Jenks; Ralph Morgan
- Cinematography: John F. Seitz
- Edited by: Conrad A. Nervig
- Music by: Edward Ward
- Production company: Metro-Goldwyn-Mayer
- Distributed by: Loew's Inc.
- Release date: January 14, 1938
- Running time: 73 minutes
- Country: United States
- Language: English

Love Is a Headache is a 1938 American comedy film directed by Richard Thorpe and written by Marion Parsonnet, Harry Ruskin and William R. Lipman. The film stars Gladys George, Franchot Tone, Ted Healy, Mickey Rooney, Frank Jenks and Ralph Morgan. The film was released on January 14, 1938, by Metro-Goldwyn-Mayer.

== Plot ==
Carlotta Lee is a famed actress whose career is not doing so well. In the hopes of saving her career, her manager convinces her to adopt two orphan children.

== Cast ==
- Gladys George as Carlotta Lee
- Franchot Tone as Peter Lawrence
- Ted Healy as Jimmy Slattery
- Mickey Rooney as Mike O'Toole
- Frank Jenks as Joe Cannon
- Ralph Morgan as Reggie Odell
- Virginia Weidler as Jake O'Toole
- Jessie Ralph as Sheriff Janet Winfield
- Fay Holden as Mary
- Barnett Parker as Hotchkiss
- Julius Tannen as Mr. Hillier
- June Brewster as Betty Bartholomew
