= She Married a Cop =

1939 film by Sidney Salkow

- Theatrical release poster
- Directed by: Sidney Salkow
- Screenplay by: Olive Cooper
- Produced by: Sol C. Siegel
- Starring: Phil Regan; Jean Parker; Jerome Cowan; Dorothea Kent; Benny Baker; Barnett Parker
- Cinematography: Ernest Miller
- Edited by: Ernest J. Nims
- Music by: Score: Cy Feuer; William Lava; Songs: Burton Lane (music); Ralph Freed (lyrics)
- Animation by: Leon Schlesinger
- Color process: Black and white
- Production company: Republic Pictures
- Distributed by: Republic Pictures
- Release date: July 12, 1939
- Running time: 66 minutes
- Country: United States
- Language: English

She Married a Cop is a 1939 American comedy film directed by Sidney Salkow and written by Olive Cooper. The film stars Phil Regan, Jean Parker, Jerome Cowan, Dorothea Kent, Benny Baker and Barnett Parker. The film was released on July 12, 1939, by Republic Pictures.

== Plot ==
A couple of cops, Jimmy Duffy and partner Joe, answer a call after a neighbor complains about the noise from an apartment where Hollywood studio animators Linda Fay and Bob Adams are auditioning actors for a cartoon pig.

After buying tickets to a policemen's ball and promising to keep the noise down, Linda overhears Jimmy singing a few notes and has an inspiration, hiring him. She neglects to tell him what for, however, and Jimmy believes he will be seen singing in a movie.

They fall in love and marry, but Jimmy is humiliated at the film's premiere, with all his family and friends there, when his voice comes from "Paddy", the cartoon pig. It leads to a separation, but Jimmy has a change of heart when he finds out that Linda is expecting a baby, which will also be used in the story of Paddy's next cartoon.

== Cast ==
- Phil Regan as Jimmy Duffy
- Jean Parker as Linda Fay
- Jerome Cowan as Bob Adams
- Dorothea Kent as Mabel Dunne
- Benny Baker as Sidney
- Barnett Parker as Bekins
- Horace McMahon as Joe Nash
- Oscar O'Shea as Pa Duffy
- Mary Gordon as Ma Duffy
- Muriel Campbell as Minnie
- Peggy Ryan as Trudy
- Richard Keene as Pete

== Awards and nominations ==
Award	Category	Nominee(s)	Result
Academy Awards	Academy Award for Best Music, Scoring	Cy Feuer	Nominated
