= Romance in the Rain (film) =

1934 film by Stuart Walker

- Directed by: Stuart Walker
- Screenplay by: Barry Trivers; Gladys Buchanan Unger
- Story by: Jay Gorney; Sig Herzig
- Produced by: Stanley Bergerman
- Starring: Roger Pryor; Heather Angel; Esther Ralston; Victor Moore; Ruth Donnelly; Henry Armetta
- Cinematography: Charles J. Stumar
- Edited by: Edward Curtiss
- Music by: Edward Ward
- Production company: Universal Pictures
- Distributed by: Universal Pictures
- Release date: August 13, 1934
- Running time: 70 minutes
- Country: United States
- Language: English

Romance in the Rain is a 1934 American comedy film directed by Stuart Walker and written by Barry Trivers and Gladys Buchanan Unger. The film stars Roger Pryor, Heather Angel, Esther Ralston, Victor Moore, Ruth Donnelly and Henry Armetta. The film was released on August 13, 1934, by Universal Pictures.

== Plot ==
Charlie Denton, a writer, conceives a national Cinderella contest to increase readership for the magazine he works for. Cynthia, winner of the Cinderella contest, tells Charlie there must be a Prince Charming for a Cinderella. A Prince Charming contest is launched to find a match for Cynthia. The winner is slated to marry Cynthia in a highly publicized ceremony. The wedding never occurs, for Charlie proposes to Cynthia and she accepts his proposal.

== Cast ==
- Roger Pryor as Charlie Denton
- Heather Angel as Cynthia Brown
- Esther Ralston as Gwen de la Rue
- Victor Moore as J. Franklyn Blank
- Ruth Donnelly as Miss Sparks
- Henry Armetta as Tulio
- Paul Kaye as Rex Bruce
- Christian Rub as Slotnick
- Frank Parker as Master of Ceremonies
- Georgia Caine as Mrs. Brown
- Yellow Horse as The Eskimo
- Betty Francisco as Julia
- Lita Chevret as Jennie
- Gay Seabrook as Gloria
- Clara Kimball Young as Mlle. Fleurette Malevinsky
- King Baggot as Milton McGillicuddy
- John T. Murray as Melville O'Grunion
- Francesca Rotoli as Fanny Pilkington
- Grace Hayle as Mrs. Crandall
- Guinn "Big Boy" Williams as Panya Mankiewicz
