= Glamour for Sale =

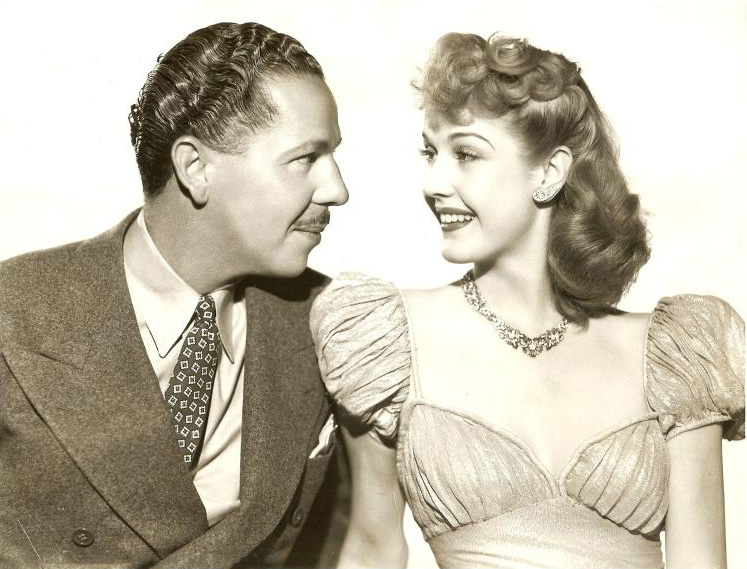
- Roger Pryor and Anita Louise in a promotional shot
- Directed by: D. Ross Lederman
- Written by: D. Ross Lederman
- Produced by: Wallace MacDonald
- Starring: Anita Louise; Roger Pryor; Frances Robinson; June MacCloy
- Cinematography: Franz Planer
- Edited by: Viola Lawrence
- Music by: Ben Oakland
- Production company: Columbia Pictures
- Distributed by: Columbia Pictures
- Release date: September 27, 1940
- Running time: 60 minutes
- Country: United States
- Language: English

Glamour for Sale is a 1940 American crime film directed by D. Ross Lederman and starring Anita Louise, Roger Pryor, and Frances Robinson.

== Plot ==
A poor girl, working for an escort agency, is given for her first client a man working for the police, who suspect the business is involved in blackmail. Her innocence of the agency's criminal activities, along with her looks, charm, and wit mean that only she among all the club's girls can help the police break one of the city's many criminal rackets.

== Cast ==
- Anita Louise as Ann Powell
- Roger Pryor as Jim Daly
- Frances Robinson as Betty Warren
- June MacCloy as Peggy Davis
- Don Beddoe as Frank Regan
- Paul Fix as Louis Manell
- Arthur Loft as Harry T. Braddock
- Veda Ann Borg as Lucille
- Minta Durfee as Matron (uncredited)

== Bibliography ==
- McCarty, Clifford. Film Composers in America: A Filmography, 1911-1970. Oxford University Press, 2000.
