= Burn 'Em Up O'Connor =

1939 film by Edward Sedgwick

- Theatrical release poster
- Directed by: Edward Sedgwick
- Written by: Milton Merlin; Byron Morgan
- Based on: Salute to the Gods; 1935 novel by Malcolm Campbell
- Produced by: Harry Rapf
- Starring: Dennis O'Keefe; Cecilia Parker; Nat Pendleton; Harry Carey
- Cinematography: Lester White
- Edited by: Ben Lewis
- Music by: David Snell
- Production company: Metro-Goldwyn-Mayer
- Distributed by: Loew's, Inc.
- Release date: January 13, 1939 (USA)
- Running time: 70 minutes
- Country: United States
- Language: English

Burn 'Em Up O'Connor is a 1939 American sports film directed by Edward Sedgwick and starring Dennis O'Keefe, Cecilia Parker, Nat Pendleton and Harry Carey. The screenplay was written by Milton Merlin and Byron Morgan from the novel Salute to the Gods by racing driver and journalist Malcolm Campbell. The cinematographer was Lester White and the picture was produced by an uncredited Harry Rapf. The supporting cast features Charley Grapewin, Alan Curtis and Tom Neal, with a brief appearance by Clayton Moore.

== Cast ==
- Dennis O'Keefe as Jerry O'Connor
- Cecilia Parker as Jane Delano
- Nat Pendleton as Buddy Buttle
- Harry Carey as P. G. Delano
- Addison Richards as Ed Eberhart
- Charley Grapewin as "Doc" Heath
- Alan Curtis as Jose "Rocks" Rivera
- Tom Neal as Hank Hogan
- Tom Collins as "Lefty" Simmons
- Frank Orth as Tim McElvy
- Frank M. Thomas as Jim Nixon
- Si Jenks as Mr. Jenkins
- Clayton Moore as Intern

== Production ==
The film was given the working title Skids. Filming began in mid-November 1938 and ended in mid-December, with Burn 'Em Up O'Connor entering the editing room in late December 1938. Filming locations included Gilmore Stadium.
