= Sally, Irene and Mary (1938 film) =

1938 film by William A. Seiter

- Theatrical release poster
- Directed by: William A. Seiter
- Screenplay by: Harry Tugend; Jack Yellen
- Story by: Karl Tunberg; Don Ettlinger
- Based on: Sally, Irene and Mary by: Eddie Dowling; Cyrus Wood
- Produced by: Gene Markey
- Starring: Alice Faye; Tony Martin; Fred Allen; Jimmy Durante; Joan Davis; Marjorie Weaver; Gregory Ratoff
- Cinematography: J. Peverell Marley
- Edited by: Walter Thompson
- Production company: 20th Century Fox
- Distributed by: 20th Century Fox
- Release date: March 4, 1938
- Running time: 86 minutes
- Country: United States
- Language: English

Sally, Irene and Mary is a 1938 American comedy film directed by William A. Seiter and written by Harry Tugend and Jack Yellen. It is based on the 1922 play Sally, Irene and Mary by Eddie Dowling and Cyrus Wood. The film stars Alice Faye, Tony Martin, Fred Allen, Jimmy Durante, Joan Davis, Marjorie Weaver and Gregory Ratoff. The film was released on March 4, 1938, by 20th Century Fox.

== Plot ==
Manicurists Sally, Irene and Mary hope to be Broadway entertainers. When Mary inherits an old ferry boat, they turn it into a successful supper club.

== Cast ==
- Alice Faye as Sally Day
- Tony Martin as Tommy Reynolds
- Fred Allen as Gabriel 'Gabby' Green
- Joan Davis as Irene Keene
- Marjorie Weaver as Mary Stevens
- Gregory Ratoff as Baron Alex Zorka
- Jimmy Durante as Jefferson Twitchel
- Gypsy Rose Lee as Joyce Taylor
- Barnett Parker as Oscar
- Eddie Collins as Ship's Captain
- Mary Treen as Miss Barkow
- Charles C. Wilson as Covered Wagon Cafe Manager
- J. Edward Bromberg as Pawnbroker
- Raymond Scott as Orchestra Leader
- Andrew Tombes as Judge
- Gwen Brian as Member of Vocal Specialty Trio
- Betty Brian as Member of Vocal Specialty Trio
- Doris Brian as Member of Vocal Specialty Trio
