= Beg, Borrow or Steal =

1937 film by Wilhelm Thiele

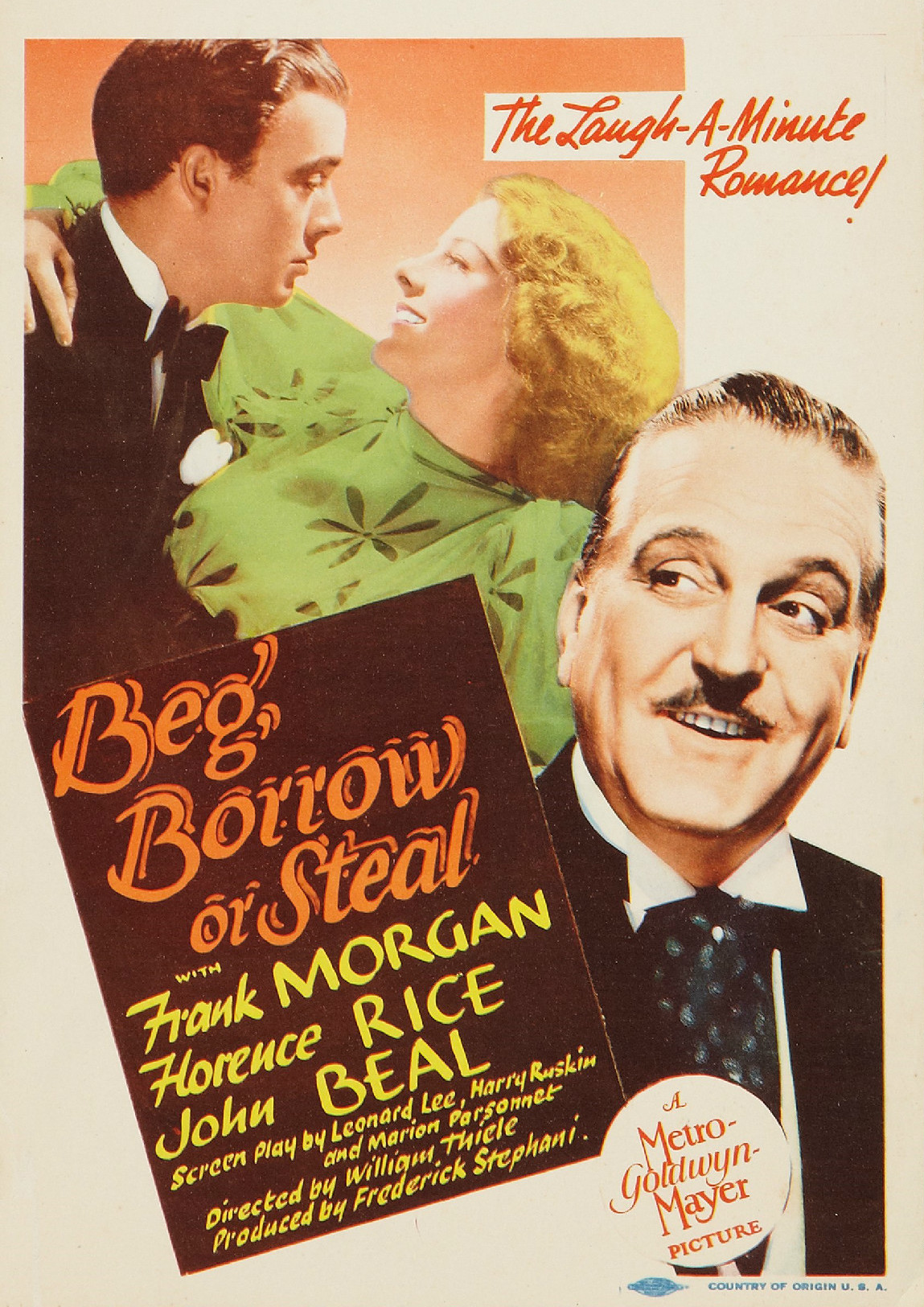
- Theatrical release poster
- Directed by: Wilhelm Thiele
- Screenplay by: Leonard Lee; Harry Ruskin; Marion Parsonnet
- Based on: Matter of Pride; 1937 story in The Saturday Evening Post by William C. White
- Produced by: Frederick Stephani
- Starring: Frank Morgan; Florence Rice; John Beal
- Cinematography: William H. Daniels
- Edited by: Conrad A. Nervig
- Music by: William Axt
- Production company: Metro-Goldwyn-Mayer
- Distributed by: Loew's Inc.
- Release date: December 3, 1937
- Running time: 72 minutes
- Country: United States
- Language: English

Beg, Borrow or Steal is a 1937 American comedy film directed by Wilhelm Thiele and written by Leonard Lee, Harry Ruskin and Marion Parsonnet. The film stars Frank Morgan, Florence Rice, John Beal, Janet Beecher, Herman Bing and Erik Rhodes. The film was released on December 3, 1937, by Metro-Goldwyn-Mayer.

== Plot ==
Con-man Ingraham Steward promises his daughter a luxurious wedding at his château in the French Riviera, although he doesn't really own the château. He induces the caretaker, Bill Cherau, to go along with his pretense.

On the day of the wedding, Bill falls in love with Ingraham's daughter and she feels the same, but still plans to have her intended wedding. Later, Ingraham has a change of heart and confesses that the château is not his. His daughter forgives him and goes to her true love Bill, who is not actually a caretaker.

== Cast ==
- Frank Morgan as Ingraham Steward
- Florence Rice as Joyce Steward
- John Beal as Count Bill Cherau
- Janet Beecher as Mrs. Agatha Steward
- Herman Bing as Von Giersdorff
- Erik Rhodes as Lefevre
- George Givot as Izmanov
- E. E. Clive as Lord Nigel Braemer
- Tom Rutherford as Horace Miller
- Cora Witherspoon as Mrs. Elizabeth Miller
- Reginald Denny as Clifton Summitt
- Vladimir Sokoloff as Sascha
- Harlan Briggs as Mr. Virgil Miller
