= Jessie Ralph =

American actress (1864–1944)

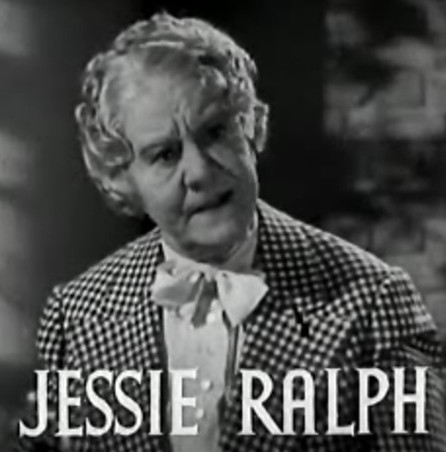
- Trailer for The Last of Mrs. Cheyney (1937)
- Born: Jessie Ralph Chambers; November 5, 1864; Gloucester, Massachusetts, U.S.
- Died: May 30, 1944 (aged 79); Gloucester, Massachusetts, U.S.
- Occupation: Actress
- Years active: 1880–1941
- Spouse(s): William Patton (1901–?; his death)

Jessie Ralph Patton (née Chambers; November 5, 1864 – May 30, 1944), was an American stage and screen actress, best known for her matronly roles in many classic films.

== Early life ==
Ralph was born in Gloucester, Massachusetts, in 1864, the 13th child of sailing captain James Chambers and his wife. She made her acting debut in stock theater in 1880, at age 16.

== Career ==
Ralph made her Broadway debut in The Kreutzer Sonata (1906) and her final appearance on Broadway was in The Good Earth (1932).

In 1915, Ralph debuted in two-reel films in New York, not arriving in Hollywood until 1933. She was nearly 70 then, so her parts were limited to matronly roles, but her ability to steal scenes captured the attention of moviegoers of the time.

Ralph's best-known roles include Nurse Pegotty in David Copperfield (1935), Nanine, Greta Garbo's maid in Camille (1936), as Myrna Loy's Aunt Katherine (in a state of permanent high dudgeon) in After the Thin Man (1936) and as Mrs. Hermosillo Brunch, battle-axe mother-in-law to W.C. Fields in The Bank Dick (1940). From 1933 to 1941, Ralph appeared in 55 films, 11 of them released during 1935.

== Personal life ==
Ralph married actor William Patton on August 21, 1901 in Manhattan, New York. They remained married until his death. They had no children.

== Death ==
Ralph retired from Hollywood in 1941 after having her leg amputated. She died in Gloucester, Massachusetts, on May 30, 1944, aged 79 and was interred in Mount Pleasant Cemetery.

== Filmography ==
Year	Film	Role	Director	Notes
1915	A Ringer for Max			short
1915	The Galloper	Sybil		
1915	Mary's Lamb	Mary Lamb		
1916	New York	Mrs. Macey	George Fitzmaurice	Lost film
1919	The Madonna of the Slums			short
1921	Such a Little Queen	Mary	George Fawcett	Lost film
1933	Child of Manhattan	Aunt Minnie	Edward Buzzell	
1933	Elmer, the Great	Sarah Crosby	Mervyn LeRoy	uncredited
1933	Cocktail Hour	Princess de Longville	Victor Schertzinger	
1933	Ann Carver's Profession	Terry (Graham's Maid)	Edward Buzzell	
1934	Nana	Zoe	George Fitzmaurice	
1934	Coming Out Party	Nora	John G. Blystone	
1934	Murder at the Vanities	Mrs. Helene Smith	Mitchell Leisen	
1934	The Affairs of Cellini	Beatrice	Gregory La Cava	
1934	One Night of Love	Angelina	Victor Schertzinger	
1934	We Live Again	Matrona Pavlovna	Rouben Mamoulian	
1934	Evelyn Prentice	Mrs. Blake	William K. Howard	
1935	David Copperfield	Nurse Peggotty	George Cukor	
1935	Enchanted April	Mrs. Phoebe Fisher	Harry Beaumont	
1935	Vanessa: Her Love Story	Lady Mullion	William K. Howard	
1935	Les Misérables	Madame Magloire	Richard Boleslawski	
1935	Mark of the Vampire	Midwife	Tod Browning	
1935	Paris in Spring	Countess de Charelle	Lewis Milestone	
1935	Jalna	Gran Whiteoak	John Cromwell	
1935	I Live My Life	Mrs. O.H.B. Gage, Kay's grandmother	W.S. Van Dyke	
1935	Metropolitan	Charwoman	Richard Boleslawski	
1935	I Found Stella Parish	Nana	Mervyn LeRoy	
1935	Captain Blood	Mrs. Barlow	Michael Curtiz	
1936	The Garden Murder Case	Mrs. Hammle	Edwin L. Marin	
1936	Yellow Dust	Mrs. Bryan	Wallace Fox	
1936	Little Lord Fauntleroy	The Applewoman	John Cromwell	
1936	The Unguarded Hour	Lady Hathaway	Sam Wood	
1936	Bunker Bean	Grandmother	Edward Killy	
1936	San Francisco	Mrs. Maisie Burley	W.S. Van Dyke	
1936	Walking on Air	Evelyn Bennett	Joseph Santley	
1936	Camille	Nanine	George Cukor	
1936	After the Thin Man	Aunt Katherine Forrest	W.S. Van Dyke	
1937	The Good Earth	Cuckoo	Sidney Franklin	
1937	The Last of Mrs. Cheyney	Duchess	Richard Boleslawski	
1937	Double Wedding	Mrs. Kensington-Bly	Richard Thorpe	
1938	Love Is a Headache	Sheriff Janet Winfield	Richard Thorpe	
1938	Hold That Kiss	Aunt Lucy	Edwin L. Marin	
1938	Port of Seven Seas	Honorine	James Whale	
1939	Four Girls in White	Miss Tobias	S. Sylvan Simon	
1939	St. Louis Blues	Aunt Tibbie	Raoul Walsh	
1939	Cafe Society	Mrs. De Witt	Edward H. Griffith	
1939	The Kid from Texas	Aunt Minetta	S. Sylvan Simon	
1939	Mickey the Kid	Veronica M. Hudson	Arthur Lubin	
1939	Drums Along the Mohawk	Mrs. Weaver	John Ford	
1940	The Blue Bird	Fairy Berylune	Walter Lang	
1940	Star Dust	Aunt Martha Parker	Walter Lang	
1940	I Can't Give You Anything But Love, Baby	Mama McGann	Albert S. Rogell	
1940	Girl from Avenue A	Mrs. Van Dyne	Otto Brower	
1940	I Want a Divorce	Grandma Brokaw	Ralph Murphy	
1940	The Bank Dick	Mrs. Hermisillo Brunch	Edward F. Cline	
1941	The Lady from Cheyenne	Mrs. McGuinness	Frank Lloyd	
1941	They Met in Bombay	Duchess of Beltravers	Clarence Brown	
