= We Who Are About to Die =

1937 film by Christy Cabanne

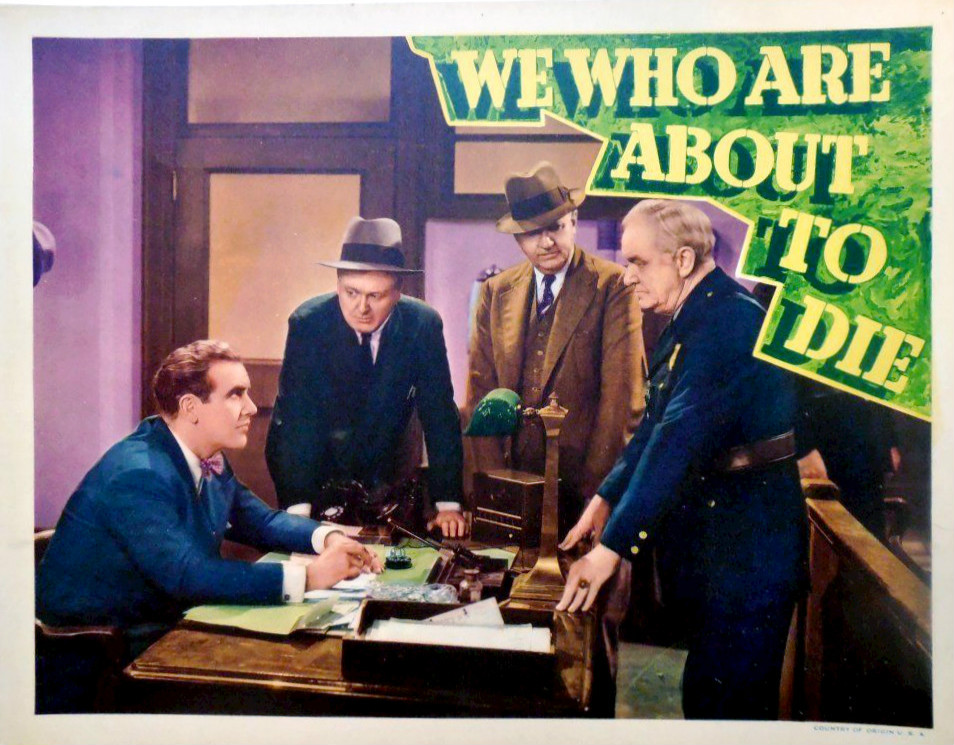
- Lobby card
- Directed by: Christy Cabanne; James Anderson (assistant)
- Written by: John Twist
- Based on: We Who Are About to Die; 1936 book by David Lamson
- Produced by: Edward Small
- Starring: Preston Foster; Ann Dvorak; John Beal
- Cinematography: Robert Planck
- Edited by: Arthur Roberts
- Production company: RKO Radio Pictures
- Distributed by: RKO Radio Pictures
- Release date: January 8, 1937
- Running time: 82 minutes
- Country: United States
- Language: English

We Who Are About to Die is a 1937 American crime drama film directed by Christy Cabanne and starring Preston Foster, Ann Dvorak, and John Beal. It was based on a book, published while on death row, by David Lamson, who was tried four times for murdering his wife before being set free.

== Plot ==
A man is kidnapped by mobsters after quitting his job, then wrongly arrested, tried, and sentenced to death for murders they committed. A suspicious detective thinks he is innocent and works to save his life.

== Cast ==
- Preston Foster as Steven Mathews
- Ann Dvorak as Miss Connie Stewart
- John Beal as John E. 'Johnny' Thompson
- Ray Mayer as Bright Boy Schultz
- Gordon Jones as Slim Tolliver
- Russell Hopton as 'Mac' MacAndrews
- J. Carrol Naish as Nick Trotti
- Paul Hurst as Tip Fuller
- Frank Jenks as Clyde Beasley
- John Wray as Jerry Daley
- Frank M. Thomas as M.L. Carter
- Barnett Parker as John Barkley
- Willie Fung as Kwong
- John Carroll as Joe Donahue
- DeWitt Jennings as Mike Brannigan
- Landers Stevens as Warden Lawton
- John 'Skins' Miller as Macy
- Howard Hickman as Prison Chaplain
- Robert Emmett O'Connor as Detective Mitchell

== Production ==
Lamson was hired by producer Edward Small to work on the script.
