= Double Wedding (1937 film) =

1937 film

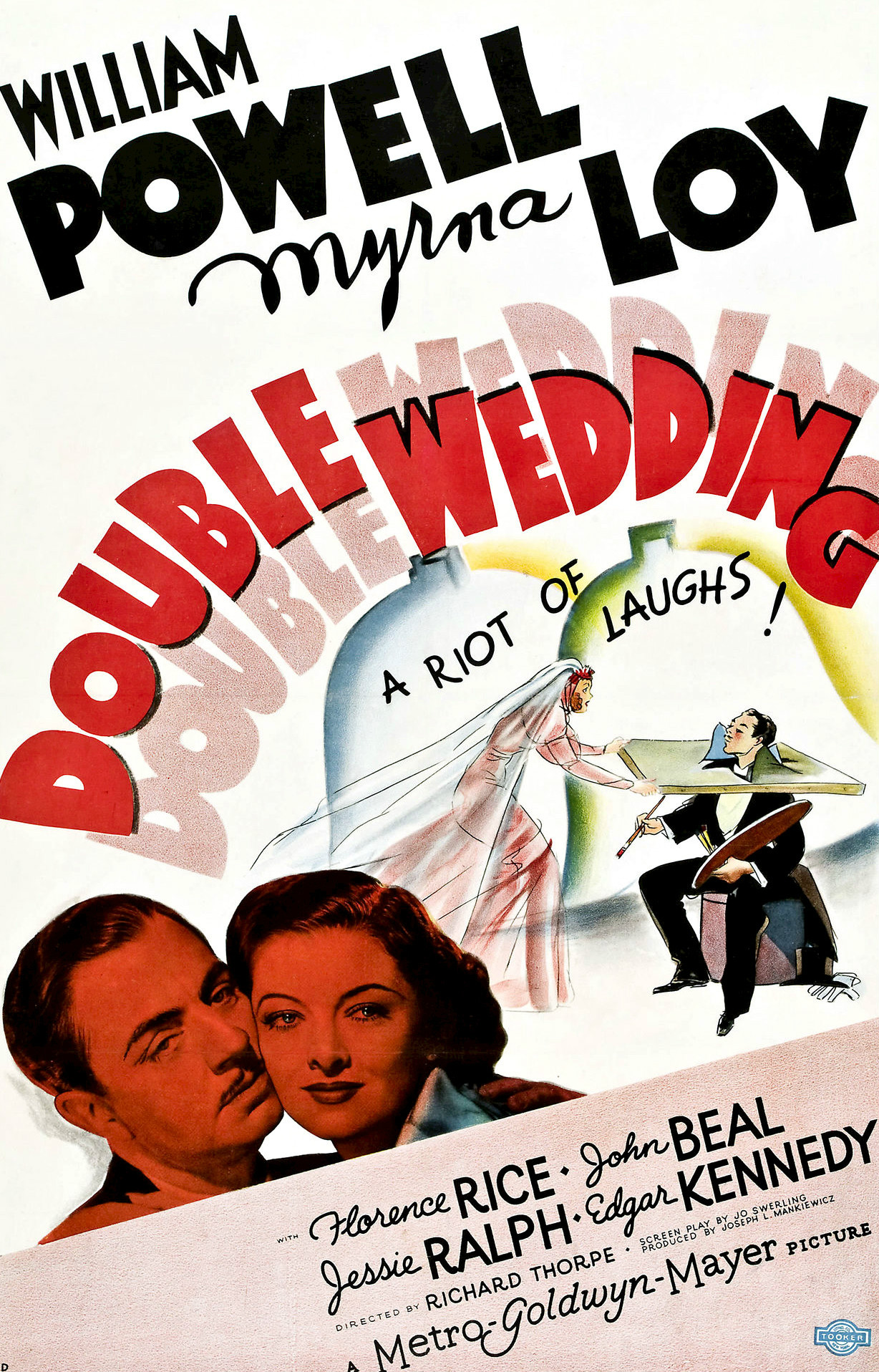
- Theatrical release poster
- Directed by: Richard Thorpe
- Screenplay by: Jo Swerling
- Based on: Nagy Szerelem ("Great Love"); 1935 novel and play by Ferenc Molnár
- Produced by: Joseph L. Mankiewicz
- Starring: William Powell; Myrna Loy; Florence Rice
- Cinematography: William H. Daniels; Harold Rosson
- Edited by: Frank Sullivan
- Music by: Edward Ward
- Production company: Metro-Goldwyn-Mayer
- Distributed by: Loew's Inc.
- Release date: October 15, 1937
- Running time: 87 minutes
- Country: United States
- Language: English

Double Wedding is a 1937 American screwball romantic comedy film starring William Powell and Myrna Loy, and featuring Florence Rice, John Beal, Jessie Ralph, and Edgar Kennedy. This was the seventh pairing of Powell and Loy, with another seven to go. It was directed by Richard Thorpe from a screenplay by Jo Swerling based on the unpublished play Nagy szerelem ("Great Love") by Ferenc Molnár.

William Powell's girlfriend Jean Harlow died during production, halting filming. Powell later described finishing the film as "very difficult under the circumstances". Myrna Loy, who had been good friends with Harlow, wrote in her autobiography that she disliked the film because of Harlow's death and that it was "the scapegoat for concurrent despair".

== Plot ==
Charlie Lodge, a free-spirited bohemian who lives in a cluttered car trailer in a parking lot, disrupts the well-ordered life of successful, hardworking businesswoman Margit Agnew when he convinces her younger sister Irene that she should become an actress. However, Margit is determined that Irene marry the fiancé she (and her mother before her) had personally picked out for her sister, the pliable, weak-willed cousin Waldo.

Fed up with Waldo's lack of initiative during a four-year engagement, Irene becomes infatuated with Charlie. He pretends to return her feelings so he can stay close to Margit. When Margit confronts him, he agrees to never see Irene again if Margit will let him paint her portrait. She reluctantly agrees to three weeks of sittings. As they spend time together, she begins to respond to his decidedly unconventional charms. Meanwhile, Charlie tries to teach Waldo to stand up for himself so that he can regain Irene's regard, but with little luck.

When Irene shows up unexpectedly at his trailer, Charlie gets her to leave, but she is spotted by Margit. Believing he lied about giving Irene up, she angrily smashes the painting over his head. Charlie arranges for a wedding, ostensibly to marry Irene, but actually as a ploy to simultaneously reconcile Irene and Waldo and win Margit's hand. However, Waldo is nowhere to be seen when Charlie is asked if he will take Irene for his wife. He is forced to answer no, and that he is really in love with Margit. She finally admits she loves him too, through tears. A drunk Waldo finally shows up, punches Charlie in the nose, knocking him down, and carries off a delighted Irene. Comedic chaos quickly ensues when all the wedding guests crammed inside the trailer misunderstand what is happening and began arguing, pushing, and shoving each other. Charlie is struck by Margit several times by accident in the tight confines of all the chaos. She is also struck and is knocked out. They both come to lie next to each other on the floor. Charlie comes to and gives her a kiss.

== Cast ==
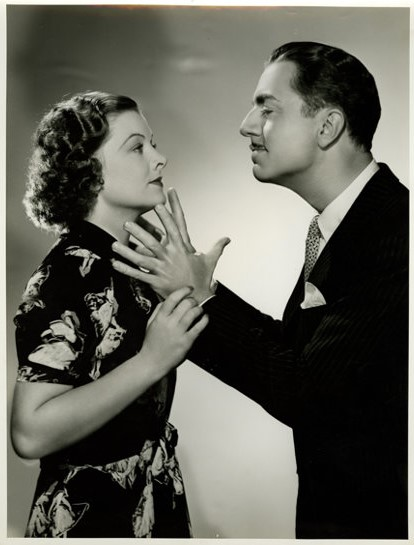
Still with William Powell and Myrna Loy

- William Powell as Charlie Lodge
- Myrna Loy as Margit Agnew
- Florence Rice as Irene Agnew
- John Beal as Waldo Beaver
- Jessie Ralph as Mrs. Kensington-Bly
- Edgar Kennedy as Spike
- Sidney Toler as Mr. Keough
- Mary Gordon as Mrs. Keough
- Barnett Parker as Mr. Flint
- Katharine Alexander as Claire Lodge, Charlie's ex-wife
- Priscilla Lawson as Felice
- Bert Roach as Shrank
- Donald Meek (uncredited) as Judge Blynn, officiating at the wedding

== Production ==
Double Wedding had the working title of Three's Company. Originally, Robert Young, and Robert Benchley were to have roles in the film, which was the seventh pairing of Powell and Loy. Loy's previous film, Parnell (1937) did not do well at the box office, so MGM paired her with Powell again to rehabilitate her career. The move was a success, and Double Wedding was a box office success.

When Jean Harlow, William Powell's girlfriend of three years died suddenly on June 7, 1937, three weeks after falling ill with uremic poisoning caused by kidney failure, production on the film was partially shut down. Her death was a blow to both Powell and Loy, a good friend of Harlow, and Powell's grief was such that he asked the studio for some time to recover. Although filming was completed on schedule, neither Powell nor Loy felt they were at their best for the film.

Film locations included Carmel-by-the-Sea and the estate of C. A. Noble, a banker and manufacturer from Milwaukee.
