= Lady Tubbs =

1935 film by Alan Crosland

- Theatrical release poster
- Directed by: Alan Crosland
- Screenplay by: Barry Trivers
- Produced by: Stanley Bergerman; Lou L. Ostrow
- Starring: Alice Brady; Douglass Montgomery; Anita Louise; Alan Mowbray; June Clayworth; Hedda Hopper
- Cinematography: Norbert Brodine
- Edited by: Murray Seldeen
- Production company: Universal Pictures
- Distributed by: Universal Pictures
- Release date: July 2, 1935
- Running time: 69 minutes
- Country: United States
- Language: English

Lady Tubbs is a 1935 American comedy film directed by Alan Crosland and written by Barry Trivers. The film stars Alice Brady, Douglass Montgomery, Anita Louise, Alan Mowbray, June Clayworth and Hedda Hopper. The film was released on July 2, 1935, by Universal Pictures.

== Cast ==
- Alice Brady as Henrietta Tubbs
- Douglass Montgomery as Phil Ash-Orcutt
- Anita Louise as Wynne Howard
- Alan Mowbray as Elyot Wembsleigh
- June Clayworth as Jean LaGendre
- Hedda Hopper as Mrs. Ronald Ash-Orcutt
- Russell Hicks as Mr. Ronald Ash-Orcutt
- Lumsden Hare as Lord Abernathy
- Virginia Hammond as Lady Abernathy
- Minor Watson as Edward J. Fishbaker
- Rafael Storm as Rinaldo
