= Lady Bodyguard =

1943 film by William Clemens

- Directed by: William Clemens
- Screenplay by: Edmund Hartmann; Art Arthur
- Story by: Edward Haldeman; Vera Caspary
- Produced by: Burt Kelly; Sol C. Siegel
- Starring: Eddie Albert; Anne Shirley; Raymond Walburn; Roger Pryor; Edward Brophy; Maude Eburne; Clem Bevans; Mary Treen
- Cinematography: Daniel L. Fapp
- Edited by: William Shea
- Music by: Paul Sawtell
- Production company: Paramount Pictures
- Distributed by: Paramount Pictures
- Release date: January 2, 1943
- Running time: 69 minutes
- Country: United States
- Language: English

Lady Bodyguard is a 1943 American comedy film directed by William Clemens. The film stars Eddie Albert, Anne Shirley, Raymond Walburn and Edward Brophy. The film was released on January 2, 1943, by Paramount Pictures.

== Plot ==
A. C. Baker wants the endorsement of test pilot Terry Moore for a national advertising campaign for her insurance company in exchange for a $1000 insurance policy. He is not interested in her proposition, but he is interested in her, so he asks her to come back at 10 pm. When George Mac Alister, Baker's boss, fires secretary Miss Tracy, she gets her revenge by changing the amount on the policy to $1,000,000.

Moore makes entertainer Avery Jamieson, bartender Harry Gargan and elderly hatcheck girl Mother Hodges his beneficiaries. He signs the policy in exchange for a promised kiss, but Baker instead flings a drink in his face and leaves, much to his amusement. He is even more amused when he notices the amount of the policy.

R. L. Barclay, the boss of the company, is furious when he finds out about the blunder in the newspaper. He orders Baker to get Moore to cancel the policy by using "her feminine wiles". When she fails to get Moore grounded for imaginary "fainting spells", she tricks him into a forced overnight stay in a sanitorium for alcoholics. Another pilot has to take over the next day and crashes. Gargan witnesses the crash and, believing Moore to be dead, notifies the other beneficiaries, who are equally delighted. However, Gargan soon discovers the pilot is neither Moore nor dead, only injured.

When Baker has Moore released, he speeds away, only to crash into a hay wagon. While his car is repaired by Elmer Frawley, a blacksmith and the hay wagon driver, he becomes better acquainted with Moore, and they decide to get married.

However, when they go to see Barclay to report that Moore is willing to cancel the policy, they are shocked when he rejects their offer. The company has received millions of dollars of business because of Moore.

Moore's erstwhile friends fear that he will replace them as beneficiaries with his fiancée, so they manage to slip him (and Baker) some sleeping powder so that he will crash when he flies to Las Vegas to get married. However, Moore good-naturedly "kidnaps" them to be witnesses at the ceremony. Before he falls asleep, he turns on the autopilot. The three beneficiaries blame each other, not realizing that the radio is sill on, and the air traffic controller has heard everything. Fortunately, Moore wakes up in time to land the plane. The couple get married, only to fall asleep afterward.

== Cast ==
- Eddie Albert as Terry Moore
- Anne Shirley as A. C. Baker
- Raymond Walburn as Avery Jamieson
- Edward Brophy as Harry Gargan (as Ed Brophy)
- Donald MacBride as R. L. Barclay
- Maude Eburne as Mother Hodges
- Clem Bevans as Elmer Frawley
- Roger Pryor as George Mac Alister
- Mary Treen as Miss Tracy
