= Live, Love and Learn =

1937 film by George Fitzmaurice

- Directed by: George Fitzmaurice
- Screenplay by: Charles Brackett; Cyril Hume; Richard Maibaum
- Story by: Marion Parsonnet; Suggested by a Story by Helen Grace Carlisle
- Produced by: Harry Rapf
- Starring: Robert Montgomery; Rosalind Russell; Robert Benchley
- Cinematography: Ray June; Joseph Ruttenberg (uncredited)
- Edited by: Conrad A. Nervig
- Music by: Edward Ward
- Distributed by: Metro-Goldwyn-Mayer
- Release date: October 29, 1937
- Running time: 78 minutes
- Country: United States
- Language: English

Live, Love and Learn is a 1937 American romantic comedy film starring Robert Montgomery, Rosalind Russell, and Robert Benchley. The movie was directed by George Fitzmaurice.

== Plot ==
A wealthy woman marries a poor bohemian artist. When he becomes wealthy, she is not happy with the way their life changes.

== Cast ==
- Robert Montgomery as Bob Graham
- Rosalind Russell as Julie Stoddard
- Robert Benchley as Oscar
- Helen Vinson as Lily Chalmers
- Monty Woolley as Mr. Bawltitude
- E.E. Clive as Mr. Palmiston
- Mickey Rooney as Jerry Crump
- Charles Judels as Pedro Felipe
- Maude Eburne as Mrs. Crump
- Harlan Briggs as Justice of the Peace
- June Clayworth as Annabella Post
- Barnett Parker as Alfredo
- Al Shean as Professor Fraum

== Reception ==
Andre Sennwald wrote in The New York Times, "The principal distinction of this unexpected preachment in behalf of the hard, Cezanne way in art (using that Greenwich Village master, Robert Montgomery, as an object lesson) is that it affords a reasonably adequate vehicle for the graduation out of very funny shorts into a not-too-funny feature-length production, of Robert Benchley, who plays a character called Oscar".
