= The Blonde from Singapore =

1941 film

- Film poster
- Directed by: Edward Dmytryk
- Written by: Houston Branch; George Bricker
- Produced by: Jack Fier
- Starring: Florence Rice; Leif Erickson; Gordon Jones
- Cinematography: L. William O'Connell
- Edited by: Richard Fantl
- Music by: Morris Stoloff
- Production company: Columbia Pictures
- Distributed by: Columbia Pictures
- Release date: October 16, 1941
- Running time: 69 minutes
- Country: United States
- Language: English

The Blonde from Singapore (also released as Hot Pearls) is a 1941 American adventure film directed by Edward Dmytryk and starring Florence Rice, Leif Erickson and Gordon Jones. It was produced and distributed by Columbia Pictures.

== Plot ==
A former commercial airline pilot and his mechanic embark on a pearl diving ship. They leave the ship when they realise their activities are illegal. On the road to Singapore they meet an actress, who pretends she's an orphan; they pity her and take her to Rang Sang.

== Cast ==
- Florence Rice as Mary Brooks
- Leif Erickson as Terry Prescott
- Gordon Jones as 'Waffles' Billings
- Don Beddoe as Sgt. Burns
- Alexander D'Arcy as Prince Sali
- Adele Rowland as Sultana
- Lumsden Hare as Reginald Belvin
- Richard Terry as Tada
- Emory Parnell as Capt. Nelson
- Uncredited actors include Filipino Hollywood actor Rudy Robles as the servant.

== Bibliography ==
- Fetrow, Alan G. Feature Films, 1940-1949: a United States Filmography. McFarland, 1994.
