= Two-Fisted Gentleman =

1936 film by Gordon Wiles

- Directed by: Gordon Wiles
- Written by: Tom Van Dycke
- Produced by: Irving Briskin; Ben Pivar
- Starring: James Dunn; June Clayworth; George McKay
- Cinematography: John Stumar
- Edited by: James Sweeney
- Production company: Columbia Pictures
- Distributed by: Columbia Pictures
- Release date: August 15, 1936
- Running time: 64 minutes
- Country: United States
- Language: English

Two-Fisted Gentleman is a 1936 American drama film directed by Gordon Wiles and starring James Dunn, June Clayworth and George McKay.

== Plot ==
Mickey rises from obscurity to become a top prizefighter, but in the process alienates girlfriend Ginger and takes up with a scheming blonde, June.

== Cast ==
- James Dunn as Mickey
- June Clayworth as Ginger
- George McKay as Schmidty
- Thurston Hall as Pop
- Gene Morgan as Porky
- Paul Guilfoyle as Gallagher
- Harry Tyler as Fieldsie
- Muriel Evans as June Prentice
- Charles Lane as Joe Gordon
- John Hamilton as Frank Boyd
- Brenda Fowler as Mrs. Prentice
- Sarah Edwards as Mrs. O'Shea
- Arthur Loft as Fletcher
- Fred Kohler Jr. as Conklin
- George Cleveland as Mr. Bainbridge
- May Wallace as Mrs. Bainbridge
- Edward LeSaint as Judge
- Max Wagner as First Beggar
- Eddie Sturgis as Second Beggar
- Ralph Byrd as Charley
- George Magrill as Tiger
- Beatrice Blinn as Secretary
- Wilson Benge as Butler
- John Tyrrell as Man in Lunch Wagon
- Arthur Rankin as Man in Lunch Wagon
- Frank Marlowe as Man in Gym
- Jimmy O'Gatty as Mac
- Carmen Garth as Rozatti
- Charles Randolph as Referee
- Bud Taylor as Referee
- Cy Schindell as Mahoney
- Albert J. Smith as Manager
- Al Lang as Announcer
- Mike Lally as Timekeeper
- Albert Pollet as Chef
- Noble 'Kid' Chissell
- Eddie Fetherston
- Robert D. Walker as Policeman
- Freeman Wood
- Bruce Sidney
- Reginald Simpson
- Bess Flowers

== See also ==
- List of boxing films

== Bibliography ==
- Frederick V. Romano. The Boxing Filmography: American Features, 1920-2003. McFarland, 2004.
