= Florence Rice =

American film actress (1907–1974)

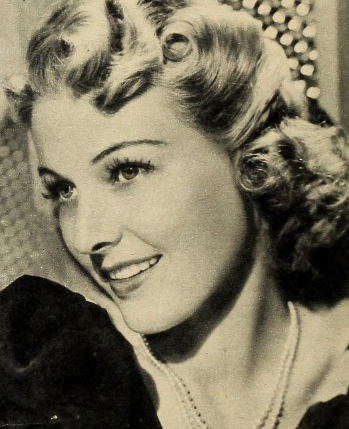
- Rice in 1940
- Born: Florence Davenport Rice; February 14, 1907; Cleveland, Ohio, U.S.
- Died: February 23, 1974 (aged 67); Honolulu, Hawaii, U.S.
- Occupation: Actress
- Years active: 1927–1947
- Spouses: David Page (annulled) Sydney A. Smith (m. 1930; div. 1931) Robert Wilcox (m. 1939; div. 1940) Fred Thomas Butler (m. 1946)
- Father: Grantland Rice

Florence Davenport Rice (February 14, 1907 – February 23, 1974) was an American film actress.

== Early years ==
Florence Davenport Rice was born in Cleveland, Ohio, the only child of sportswriter Grantland Rice and Fannie Katherine Hollis. She attended Dwight School for Girls at Englewood, New Jersey, and Smith College.

== Career ==
Rice became an actress during the late 1920s, and after several Broadway roles, eventually made her way to Hollywood, where she acted in almost 50 films between 1934 and 1943.

Rice was cast as the reliable girlfriend in several films for Metro-Goldwyn-Mayer, which gradually provided her with more substantial roles, occasionally in prestige productions. Rice never became a major figure in movies, but she performed in a number of screen pairings with Robert Young.

Her most widely seen performances were in Double Wedding (1937), in which she was billed third in the cast credits behind William Powell and Myrna Loy, Sweethearts (1938) with Jeanette MacDonald and Nelson Eddy, and The Marx Brothers film At The Circus (1939).

Radio programs on which Rice appeared included Hollywood Playhouse.

During the 1940s, the quality of her roles steadily decreased, and in 1947, she retired.

== Personal life ==
Rice's first marriage, to David Page, was annulled. She married broker Sydney A. Smith in New York City on June 12, 1930; they were divorced on May 18, 1931. On March 30, 1939, she married fellow actor Robert Wilcox. They separated less than 2 months later and divorced on July 30, 1940. From August 29, 1946 until her death, Rice was married to Fred Thomas Butler. In 1958, they moved to Hawaii.

== Death ==
On February 23, 1974, at age 67, Rice died from lung cancer at Straub Clinic in Honolulu. She was survived by her husband. At her request, no funeral was held, and her remains were cremated, with her ashes scattered over the waters near Waikiki Beach.

== Filmography ==
- Fugitive Lady (1934) as Ann Duncan
- The Best Man Wins (1935) as Ann Barry
- Under Pressure (1935) as Pat Dodge
- Carnival (1935) as Miss Holbrook
- Death Flies East (1935) as Evelyn Vail
- The Awakening of Jim Burke (1935) as Tess Hardie
- Guard That Girl (1935) as Helen Bradford
- Escape from Devil's Island (1935) as Johanna Harrington
- Super Speed (1935) as Billie Devlin
- Pride of the Marines (1936) as Molly Malone
- Panic on the Air (1936) as Mary Connor aka Cremer
- Blackmailer (1936) as Joan Rankin
- Women Are Trouble (1936) as Ruth Nolan
- Sworn Enemy (1936) as Margaret 'Peg' Gattle
- The Longest Night (1936) as Joan Sutton
- Under Cover of Night (1937) as Deb Reed
- Man of the People (1937) as Abbey Reid
- Riding on Air (1937) as Betty Harrison
- Married Before Breakfast (1937) as Kitty Brent
- Double Wedding (1937) as Irene Agnew
- Navy Blue and Gold (1937) as Patricia 'Pat' Gates
- Beg, Borrow or Steal (1937) as Joyce Steward
- Paradise for Three (1938) as Hilde Tobler
- Fast Company (1938) as Garda Sloane
- Vacation from Love (1938) as Patricia Lawson
- Sweethearts (1938) as Kay Jordan
- Stand Up and Fight (1939) as Susan Griffith
- Four Girls in White (1939) as Norma Page
- The Kid from Texas (1939) as Margo Thomas
- Miracles for Sale (1939) as Judy Barclay
- At the Circus (1939) as Julie Randall
- Little Accident (1939) as Alice Pearson
- Broadway Melody of 1940 (1940) as Amy Blake
- Girl in 313 (1940) as Joan Matthews
- Phantom Raiders (1940) as Cora Barnes
- The Secret Seven (1940) as Lola Hobbs
- Cherokee Strip (1940) as Kate Cross
- Mr. District Attorney (1941) as Terry Parker
- Father Takes a Wife (1941) as Enid
- Doctors Don't Tell (1941) as Diana Wayne
- The Blonde from Singapore (1941) as Mary Brooks
- Borrowed Hero (1941) as Ann Thompson
- Tramp, Tramp, Tramp (1942) as Pam Martin
- Let's Get Tough! (1942) as Nora Stevens
- Stand By All Networks (1942) as Frances Prescott
- The Boss of Big Town (1942) as Linda Gregory
- The Ghost and the Guest (1943) as Jacqueline 'Jackie' DeLong / Frye (final film role)
