= Transient Lady =

1935 film by Edward Buzzell

- Directed by: Edward Buzzell
- Screenplay by: Edward Buzzell; Arthur Caesar; Harvey F. Thew
- Based on: Transient Lady; 1934 novel by Octavus Roy Cohen
- Produced by: Julius Bernheim; Carl Laemmle, Jr.
- Starring: Gene Raymond; Henry Hull; Frances Drake; June Clayworth; Clark Williams; Edward Ellis
- Cinematography: Charles J. Stumar
- Edited by: Maurice Wright
- Production company: Universal Pictures
- Distributed by: Universal Pictures
- Release date: March 4, 1935
- Running time: 69 minutes
- Country: United States
- Language: English

Transient Lady is a 1935 American drama film directed by Edward Buzzell. The screenplay was written by Edward Buzzell, Arthur Caesar and Harvey F. Thew, based on a 1934 novel by Octavus Roy Cohen, and starring Gene Raymond, Henry Hull, Frances Drake, June Clayworth, Clark Williams and Edward Ellis. It was released on March 4, 1935, by Universal Pictures.

== Plot ==
When Senator Baxter's brother is murdered, he tries to place the blame on an innocent man.

== Cast ==
- Gene Raymond as Carey Marshall
- Henry Hull as Sen. Hamp Baxter
- Frances Drake as Dale Cameron
- June Clayworth as Pat Warren
- Clark Williams as Chris Blake
- Edward Ellis as Nick Kiley
- Frederick Burton as Major Marshall
- Douglas Fowley as Matt Baxter
- Helen Lowell as Matilda Branham
- Clara Blandick as Eva Branham
- Phillip Trent as Fred Baxter
- Al Bridge as Sheriff Angel Verner
- Willard Robertson as Ed Goring
- Eddie "Rochester" Anderson as 'Noxious'
- Johnny Taylor as 'Plato'
