= Hold That Kiss =

1938 film by Edwin L. Marin

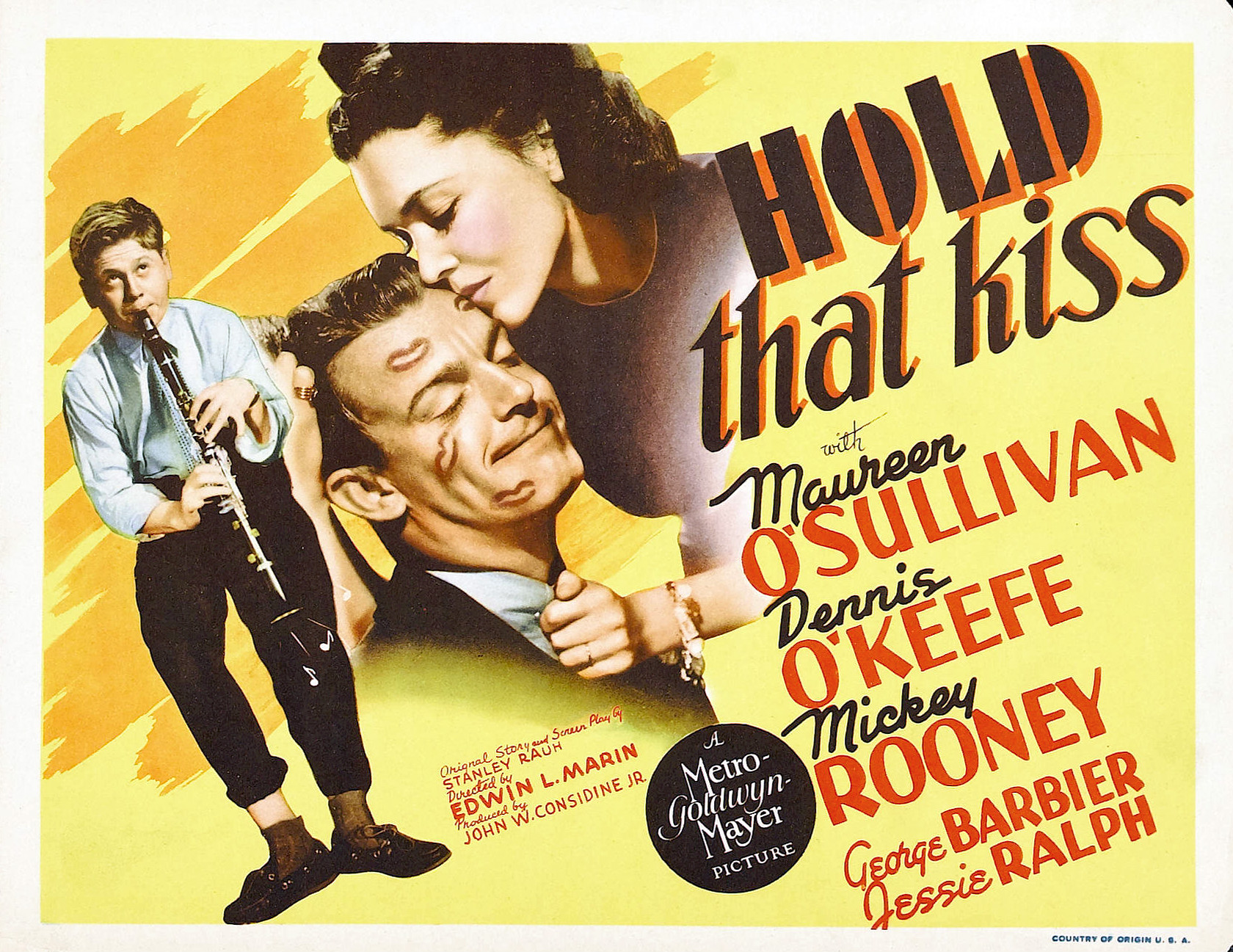
- Lobby card
- Directed by: Edwin L. Marin
- Written by: Stanley Rauh (screenplay and story); Bradbury Foote (uncredited dialogue); June Hall (uncredited); Ogden Nash (uncredited)
- Produced by: John W. Considine Jr.
- Starring: Maureen O'Sullivan; Dennis O'Keefe
- Cinematography: George J. Folsey
- Edited by: Ben Lewis
- Music by: Edward Ward
- Production company: Metro-Goldwyn-Mayer
- Distributed by: Loews, Inc.
- Release date: May 13, 1938
- Running time: 75 or 79 minutes
- Country: United States
- Language: English

Hold That Kiss is a 1938 American romantic comedy film directed by Edwin L. Marin and starring Maureen O'Sullivan and Dennis O'Keefe. An MGM B movie, this was O'Keefe's first lead role and the last film in which Mickey Rooney did not receive star billing.

== Plot ==
Travel agency clerk Tommy Bradford (Dennis O'Keefe) delivers tickets to wealthy J. Westley Piermont (George Barbier) at the lavish wedding of his daughter. Piermont introduces him to model June Evans (Maureen O'Sullivan), but neglects to mention neither one is a guest. June is there to help the daughter with her wedding dress. Both pretend to be rich. Tommy gives June his telephone number, but neither expects anything to come of their momentary attraction to each other.

That night, after she tells her family about her adventure, her obnoxious, younger, musician brother Chick (Mickey Rooney) phones Tommy, pretending to be June's servant, and forces his sister to continue the charade. Tommy is pressured to maintain the masquerade as well by his roommate Al (Edward Brophy), an insurance salesman who dreams of making contacts in New York high society.

They begin seeing each other. Their first date is at the Westminster Dog Show, where they run into Piermont again. He has two dogs entered in the competition. Piermont insists his Pomeranian will win, but Tommy champions his other entry, a St. Bernard. Sure of himself, the millionaire promises to give the St. Bernard to Tommy if it wins. It does, and he does. With no place to keep it, Tommy makes a present of it to June.

Their second date is at a movie theater where another of June's brothers (Phillip Terry) works. By this point, June's family is anxious to meet her boyfriend. Her aunt Lucy (Jessie Ralph) is the housekeeper for a wealthy family, so while her employers are away, she borrows their home to host a dinner. Afterward, Tommy tries to confess to June, but she misunderstands and thinks he has found her out instead. Outraged by what she thinks are insults aimed at her family, she breaks up with him.

Aunt Lucy recognizes Tommy and sets her niece straight. June shows up at Tommy's workplace and gives him a hard time, pretending to be a potential customer. When she leaves, Tommy sees her get into a delivery van with her employer's name on it. Realizing the truth, he goes to her workplace and returns the favor, forcing her to model dress after dress. In the end though, they decide to restart their relationship afresh.

== Cast ==
- Maureen O'Sullivan as June Evans
- Dennis O'Keefe as Tommy Bradford
- Mickey Rooney as Chick Evans
- George Barbier as Mr. J. Westley Piermont
- Jessie Ralph as Aunt Lucy McCaffey
- Edward Brophy as Al (credited as Edward S. Brophy)
- Fay Holden as Mrs. Emily Evans, June's mother
- Frank Albertson as Steven Evans, June's brother
- Phillip Terry as Ted Evans
- Ruth Hussey as Nadine Piermont Kent, Piermont's daughter
- Barnett Parker as Maurice, June's couturier employer
