= La Conga Nights =

- Theatrical release poster
- Directed by: Lew Landers
- Screenplay by: Jay Dratler; Harry Clork; Paul Gerard Smith
- Produced by: Ken Goldsmith
- Starring: Hugh Herbert; Dennis O'Keefe; Constance Moore; Ferike Boros; Eddie Quillan; Armida
- Cinematography: Elwood Bredell
- Edited by: Ted J. Kent
- Production company: Universal Pictures
- Distributed by: Universal Pictures
- Release date: May 31, 1940
- Running time: 70 minutes
- Country: United States
- Language: English

La Conga Nights is a 1940 American comedy film directed by Lew Landers and written by Jay Dratler, Harry Clork and Paul Gerard Smith. The film stars Hugh Herbert, Dennis O'Keefe, Constance Moore, Ferike Boros, Eddie Quillan and Armida. The film was released on May 31, 1940, by Universal Pictures.

== Plot ==
Rhumba music lover as well as millionaire playboy Henry I. Dibble Jr. usually by his side are his four maiden sisters Faith, Hope, Charity and Prudence. They order Junior to evict Mama O'Brien from property owned by the Dibble estate because she can not pay the rent, but Junior decides to move in when he hears rhumba music coming from the property.

== Cast ==
- Hugh Herbert as Henry I. Dibble Jr. / Faith Dibble / Hope Dibble / Charity Dibble / Prudence Dibble / Mrs. Henry I. Dibble Jr. / Henry I. Dibble Sr.
- Dennis O'Keefe as Steve Collins
- Constance Moore as Helen Curtiss
- Ferike Boros as Mama O'Brien
- Eddie Quillan as Titus Endover
- Armida as Carlotta De Vera
- Joe Brown Jr. as Delancey O'Brien
- Sally Payne as Lucy Endover
- Frank Orth as Dennis O'Brien
- Barnett Parker as Hammond
