= Barnett Parker =

British actor (1886–1941)

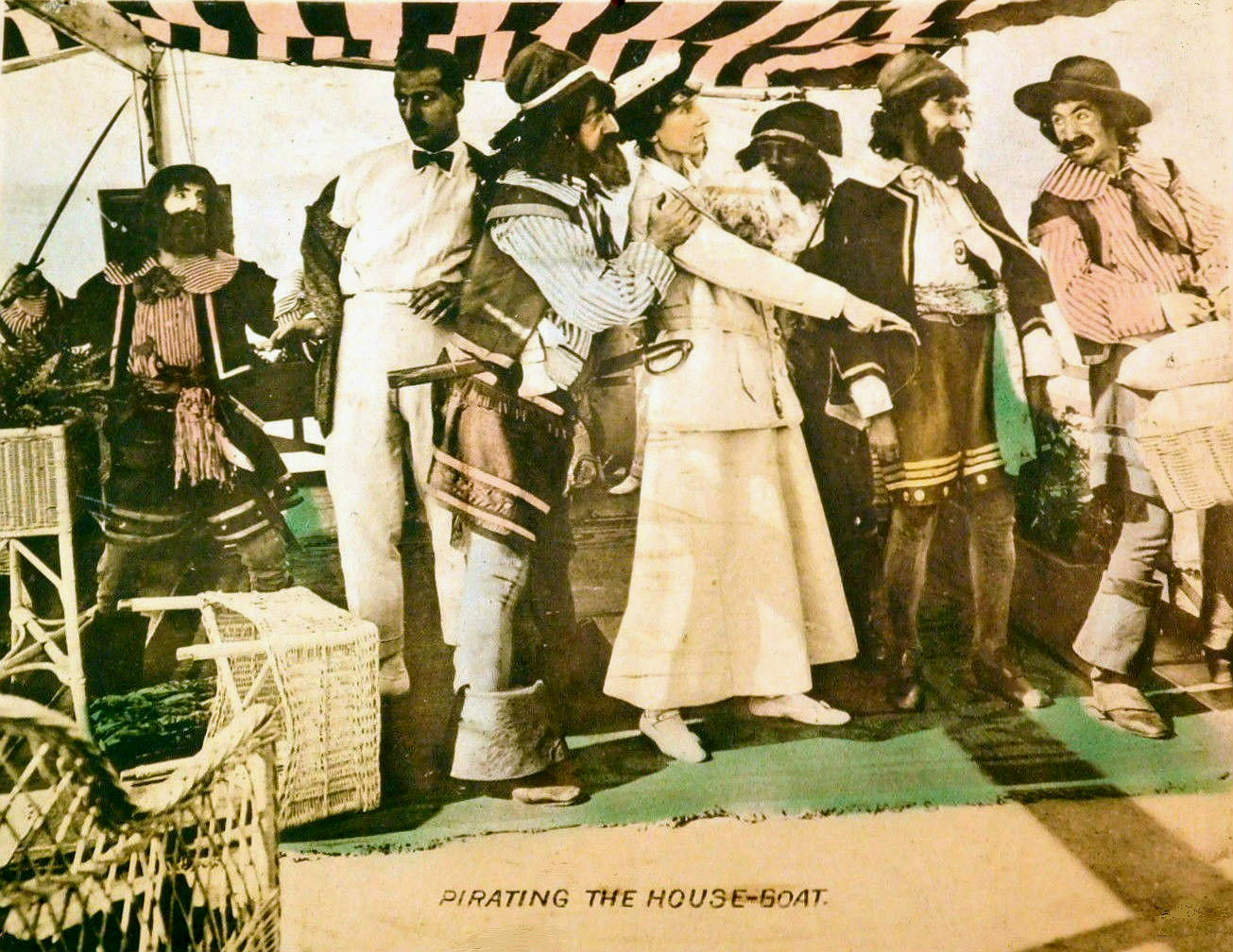
- Lobby card for Prudence the Pirate (1916) with Parker at center in white
- Born: September 11, 1886; Batley, Yorkshire, England, United Kingdom
- Died: August 5, 1941 (aged 54); Los Angeles, California, U.S.
- Occupation: Actor
- Years active: 1915-1941

Barnett Parker (September 11, 1886 – August 5, 1941) was a British actor.

== Biography ==
He appeared in the films The Misleading Lady, Roaming Lady, The President's Mystery, Adventure in Manhattan, Born to Dance, We Who Are About to Die, Dangerous Number, The Last of Mrs. Cheyney, Espionage, Ready, Willing, and Able, Personal Property, Married Before Breakfast, The Emperor's Candlesticks, Wake Up and Live, Broadway Melody of 1938, Double Wedding, Live, Love and Learn, Navy Blue and Gold, Love Is a Headache, Sally, Irene and Mary, Hold That Kiss, Marie Antoinette, Listen, Darling, The Girl Downstairs, She Married a Cop, Babes in Arms, At the Circus, He Married His Wife, La Conga Nights, Hit Parade of 1941, Hullabaloo, One Night in the Tropics, Love Thy Neighbor, The Reluctant Dragon, Tall, Dark and Handsome, A Man Betrayed, Kisses for Breakfast and The Great Awakening, among others.

Parker died at the Cedars of Lebanon Hospital in Los Angeles on August 5, 1941, after a series of heart attacks. He was survived by two sisters.

== Filmography ==
Year	Title	Role	Notes
1916	The Flight of the Duchess	The Duke	
1916	The Traffic Cop	Book Agent	
1916	Prudence the Pirate	John Astorbilt	
1920	The Misleading Lady	Steve	
1936	Mr. Deeds Goes to Town	Butler	Uncredited
1936	Roaming Lady	Waters	
1936	The King Steps Out	Ballet Master	Uncredited
1936	The General Died at Dawn	Englishman on Train	Uncredited
1936	The President's Mystery	Roger	
1936	Adventure in Manhattan	John - Gregory's Butler	Uncredited
1936	Libeled Lady	Butler	Uncredited
1936	A Woman Rebels	Lady Gaythorne's Lawyer	Uncredited
1936	Born to Dance	Floorwalker	
1937	We Who Are About to Die	John Barkley	
1937	Dangerous Number	Minehardi	
1937	When You're in Love	Butler	Uncredited
1937	The Last of Mrs. Cheyney	Purser	
1937	Espionage	Bill Cordell	
1937	Ready, Willing, and Able	Waiter	
1937	Personal Property	Arthur 'Trevy' Trevelyan	
1937	Married Before Breakfast	Tweed	
1937	The Emperor's Candlesticks	Albert - Stephan's Butler	
1937	Wake Up and Live	Foster	
1937	Broadway Melody of 1938	Jerry Jason	
1937	Double Wedding	Flint	
1937	Live, Love and Learn	Alfredo	
1937	Navy Blue and Gold	Graves	
1938	Love Is a Headache	Hotchkiss, Carlotta's Butler	
1938	Sally, Irene and Mary	Oscar	
1938	Hold That Kiss	Maurice	
1938	Marie Antoinette	Prince de Rohan	
1938	Listen, Darling	Abercrombie	
1938	The Girl Downstairs	Hugo, the Butler	
1939	She Married a Cop	Bekins, the Butler	
1939	Hotel for Women	Photographer	Uncredited
1939	Babes in Arms	William	
1939	At the Circus	Whitcomb	
1940	He Married His Wife	Huggins, the Butler	
1940	If I Had My Way	Floorwalker	Uncredited
1940	La Conga Nights	Hammond	
1940	Hit Parade of 1941	Mr. Pasley	
1940	Hullabaloo	Samuel Stephens	
1940	One Night in the Tropics	Thompson, Steve's Butler	Uncredited
1940	Love Thy Neighbor	George - Fred's Chauffeur	
1941	The Reluctant Dragon	The Dragon	(segment "The Reluctant Dragon"), Voice
1941	Tall, Dark and Handsome	Quentin, the Butler	
1941	A Man Betrayed	George - Cameron's Butler	
1941	Kisses for Breakfast	Phillips	
1941	The Great Awakening	The Duke	Last Film Role
