= Stanley Bergerman =

American film producer

- Born: August 27, 1903; Pueblo, Colorado, U.S.
- Died: July 13, 1998 (aged 94); Los Angeles, California, U.S.
- Spouses: Rosabelle Laemmle (predeceased); Fay Schiller
- Children: Carol Bergerman; Stanley Bergerman Jr.
- Family: Carl Laemmle (father-in-law)

Stanley Bergerman (August 27, 1903 – July 13, 1998) was an American producer of horror films in the 1930s.

== Biography ==
Bergerman was born on August 27, 1903 to a Jewish family in Pueblo, Colorado and raised in San Diego, California. As a young adult, he worked for The May Department Stores Company in Los Angeles as a merchandise manager. After he married Rosabelle Laemmle in 1929, the daughter of Universal Pictures founder Carl Laemmle, he entered the film industry and started producing films focusing on horror films and sports documentaries. He later worked as a talent manager and a commercial real estate investor.

During World War II, Bergerman helped to establish the Refugee Resettlement Committee which assisted Jews fleeing Nazi Germany to immigrate to the United States. He was a supporter of the United Way, the American Red Cross, the Jewish Home for the Aging, the Los Angeles chapter of the National Conference of Christians and Jews, the Motion Picture and Television Fund, and the Anti-Defamation League of B'nai B'rith.

== Personal life ==
His first wife was Rosabelle Laemmle, whom he married in 1929; they had two children: Carol Bergerman and Stanley Bergerman Jr. His wife and daughter predeceased him and he remarried to Fay Schiller with whom he had two stepdaughters: Nancy Tack and Joan Silver. Bergerman died of cancer in Los Angeles.

== Filmography ==
=== 1930 ===
- Parlez Vous (Short) (producer)
- Rolling Along (Short) (producer)
- We! We! Marie! (Short) (producer)

=== 1931 ===
- What a Doctor! (Short) (supervising producer - as M. Stanley Bergerman)
- El Tenorio del harem (producer)
- Various Shifts (Short) (producer)
- Carry On (Short) (supervising producer)
- First to Fight (Short) (producer)
- A Burglar to the Rescue (Short) (producer)
- Trapped (Short) (supervising producer)
- Sealed Lips (Short) (supervising producer)
- Bless the Ladies (Short) (producer)
- House of Mystery (Short) (producer)
- Sold at Auction (Short) (producer)

=== 1932 ===
- Slide, Babe, Slide (Short) (supervising producer)
- The Unexpected Father (associate producer)
- The Red Shadow (Short) (supervising producer)
- The Eyes Have It (Short) (producer)
- Just Pals (Short) (supervising producer)
- Fancy Curves (Short) (supervising producer)
- The Circus Show-Up (Short) (supervising producer)
- The Cohens and Kellys in Hollywood (associate producer)
- Destry Rides Again (associate producer)
- The Rider of Death Valley (associate producer)
- Heroes of the West (producer - uncredited)
- The Texas Bad Man (associate producer)
- Kid Glove Kisses (Short) (producer)
- The Fourth Horseman (associate producer)
- Hidden Gold (supervising producer)
- The Mummy (associate producer - uncredited)
- Flaming Guns (associate producer)

=== 1933 ===
- Terror Trail (supervising producer)
- The Rustler's Roundup (supervising producer)
- Moonlight and Pretzels (supervising producer)

=== 1934 ===
- The Countess of Monte Cristo (producer)
- I Like It That Way (producer)
- Romance in the Rain (producer)
- Embarrassing Moments (producer)
- Great Expectations (producer)
- Cheating Cheaters (producer)
- Strange Wives (producer)

=== 1935 ===
- Werewolf of London (executive producer)
- Chinatown Squad (executive producer)
- Manhattan Moon (producer)
- Lady Tubbs (producer - uncredited)
- The Raven (executive producer - uncredited)
