= Angela (1955 film) =

1955 film by Dennis O'Keefe

- Belgium theatrical poster
- Directed by: Dennis O'Keefe
- Written by: Dennis O'Keefe
- Produced by: Steven Pallos; Augusto Fantechi
- Starring: Dennis O'Keefe; Mara Lane; Rossano Brazzi; Arnoldo Foà
- Cinematography: Leonida Barboni
- Edited by: Giancarlo Cappelli
- Music by: Mario Nascimbene
- Distributed by: Twentieth Century-Fox Film Corporation
- Release dates: November 17, 1954 (Italy); June 3, 1955 (United States)
- Running time: 81 minutes
- Countries: United States; Italy
- Languages: English; Italian

Angela is a 1955 American-Italian film noir, written and directed by Dennis O'Keefe, who stars in the film as well. The drama also features Mara Lane, Rossano Brazzi, Arnoldo Foà and others. The film has a voice-over narration that tells the story in flashback, and the film noir type of Angela has been described as femme fatale with elements of betrayal and obsession.

== Plot ==
O’Keefe (Steve Catlett) stars as an American G.I. who remained in Italy after the war to manage a car dealership. He falls in love with a secretary (Mara Lane), and after only one date with her, she asks him to dispose of her boss’ body, who has died of a heart attack in her apartment. O'Keefe places the body in the trunk of the wrong car and watches helplessly as Lane drives away with it. O’Keefe then goes about trying to fix the situation, but a police inspector (Arnoldo Foà) and Lane's sadistic husband (Rossano Brazzi) have ulterior motives in store for him.

== Cast ==
- Dennis O'Keefe as Steve Catlett
- Mara Lane as Angela Towne
- Rossano Brazzi as Nino
- Arnoldo Foà as Captain Ambrosi
- Galeazzo Benti as Gustavo Venturi
- Enzo Fiermonte as Sergeant Collins
- Nino Crisman as Bertolati
- Giovanni Fostini as Tony
- Francesco Tensi as Dr. Robini
- Maria Teresa Paliani as Beautician
- Gorella Gori as Nurse
- Aldo Pini as Doorkeeper

== Reviews and reception ==
A review in The New York Times was critical of the film, stating that "Mr. O'Keefe has himself a near-dud" and "the camera seems to be waiting for the picture to catch up with it". However, the reviewer praises the performance of Arnoldo Foà as being "ahead of it" [the camera]. Hal Erickson reviewed the film for AllMovie and opined that it "lacks the pacing and punch necessary to sustain audience empathy", but O'Keefe still "knows how to frame a scene and get the most out of his largely unknown cast". The Internet Movie Database rates the film a 5.4/10, based on user reviews. Michael Keaney wrote in his book, Film noir guide, that "O’Keefe is okay as the American patsy, as is Italian romantic lead Brazzi as Lane’s sadistic husband, but the all-too-familiar plot doesn’t make the grade".

== See also ==
- List of American films of 1955
- List of film noir titles
