= June Clayworth =

American actress (1905–1993)

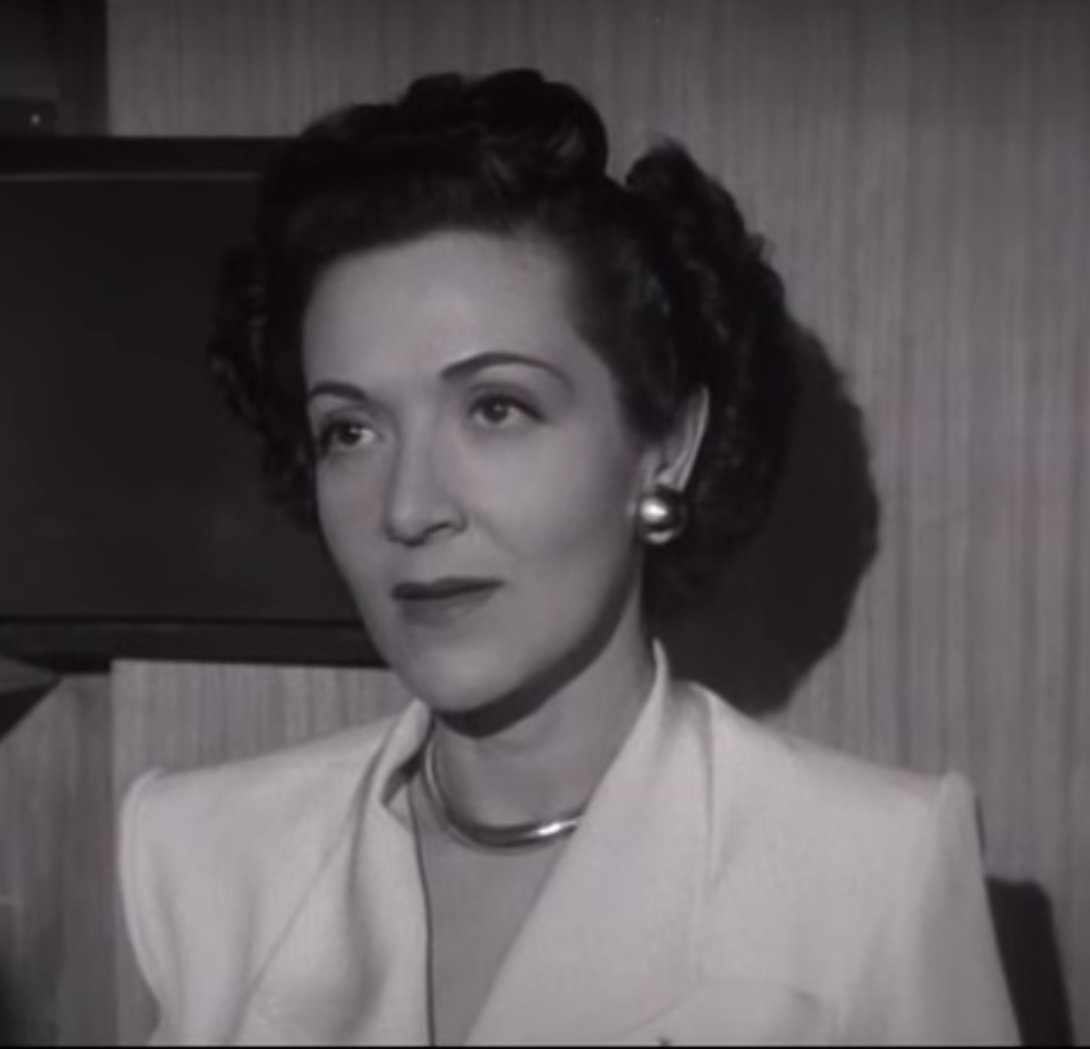
- Clayworth in Dick Tracy Meets Gruesome (1947)
- Born: Esther June Cantor; June 9, 1905; New Jersey, U.S.
- Died: January 1, 1993 (aged 87); Woodland Hills, California, U.S.
- Education: Emerson School of Oratory
- Occupation: Actress
- Years active: 1930–1961
- Spouse: Sid Rogell (m. 1938; died 1973)
- Children: 1

June Clayworth (born Esther June Cantor; June 9, 1905 – January 1, 1993) was an American stage and film actress.

== Early years ==
The daughter of Mr. and Mrs. David Cantor, Clayworth was born Esther June Cantor in New Jersey but raised in Wilkes-Barre, Pennsylvania. She graduated from Coughlin High School and studied at the Emerson College of Oratory in Boston.

Clayworth was chosen Miss Wilkes-Barre and represented the city in the Miss America 1927 pageant.

== Career ==
Clayworth gained acting experience in stock theatre, including working in the Thatcher Stock Company of Scranton, Pennsylvania, and being the leading lady in the Hudson Players troupe at Scarboro, New York. Her Broadway debut came in Torch Song (1930); she also appeared in Page Pygmalion (1932) on Broadway.

She signed her first film contract with Warner Bros. Her film debut came in The Good Fairy (1935). Later, she worked for Universal Pictures and Columbia Pictures.

== Personal life ==
She was married to the producer Sid Rogell. Clayworth died in Woodland Hills, California.

== Filmography ==
Film
Year	Title	Role	Notes
1934	Strange Wives	Nadja	
1935	The Good Fairy	Mitzi	
1935	Transient Lady	Pat Warren	
1935	Lady Tubbs	Jean LaGendre	
1935	False Witness		
1936	Two-Fisted Gentleman	Ginger	
1937	Married Before Breakfast	June Baylin	
1937	Between Two Women	Eleanor	
1937	Live, Love and Learn	Annabella Post	
1939	Almost a Gentleman	Marion Gates	
1946	The Truth About Murder	Marsha Crane	
1946	Criminal Court	Joan Mason	
1947	Beat the Band	Willow Martin	
1947	Dick Tracy Meets Gruesome	Dr. Irma M. Learned	
1948	Bodyguard	Connie Fenton	
1950	The White Tower	Mme. Astrid Delambre	
1952	At Sword's Point	Comtesse Claudine	
1953	Dream Wife	Mrs. May Elkwood	
1954	The Rocket Man	Harriet Snedley	
1955	There's Always Tomorrow	Minor Role	Uncredited
1959	Perry Mason	Eva Scott	
1961	The Marriage-Go-Round	Flo Granger	(final film role)

== Bibliography ==
- Keaney, Michael F. Film Noir Guide: 745 Films of the Classic Era, 1940-1959. McFarland, 2003.
