= Roger Pryor (actor) =

American actor (1901–1974)

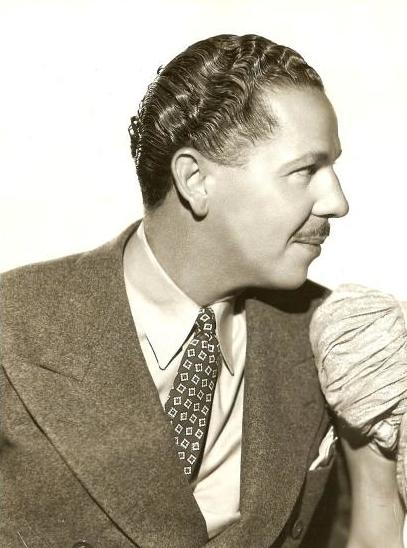
- Publicity still of Pryor in Glamour for Sale (1940)
- Born: August 27, 1901; New York City, New York, U.S.
- Died: January 31, 1974 (aged 72); Puerto Vallarta, Mexico
- Occupation: Actor
- Years active: 1924–1945
- Spouses: Priscilla J. Mitchell (m. 1926; div. 1936) Ann Sothern (m. 1936; div. 1943)
- Children: 1
- Father: Arthur Pryor
- Relatives: Bessie Clayton (former-mother-in-law); Julian Mitchell (former-father-in-law)

Roger Pryor (August 27, 1901 – January 31, 1974) was an American film actor.

== Early years ==
Roger Pryor was born in New York City the son of bandmaster Arthur Pryor and Maud Russell. He had a brother, Arthur Pryor Jr., who was also a bandmaster. Pryor attended the Dwight School in New York. While there, he became so interested in performing on stage that "he and the school parted company by mutual consent."

== Stage ==
Pryor's debut on stage came in stock theater when he was 18, after which he worked with several repertory theatre companies. His Broadway credits include The Backslapper (1925), The Sea Woman (1925), Paid (1925), Saturday's Children (1927), The Royal Family (1927), See Naples and Die (1929), Apron Strings (1930), Up Pops the Devil (1930), A Modern Virgin (1931), Here Goes the Bride (1931), Blessed Event (1932), There's Always Juliet (1932), and Message for Margaret (1947).

== Film ==
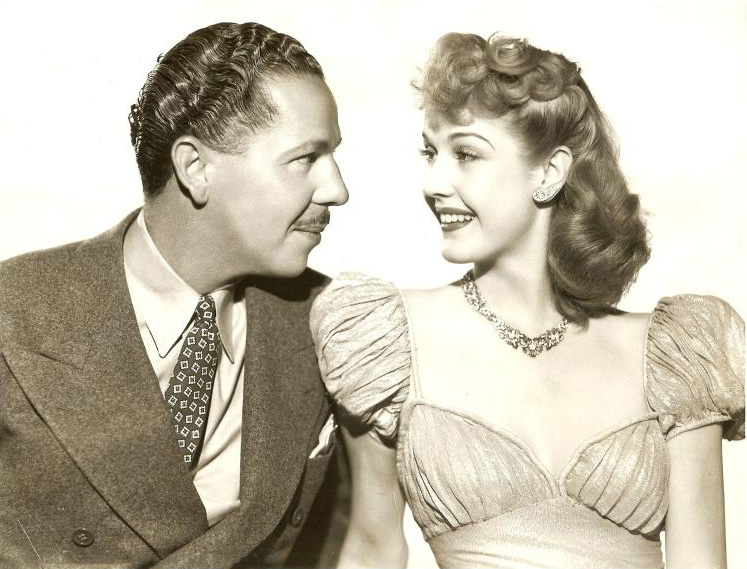
Still with Roger Pryor and Anita Louise in Glamour for Sale (1940)

Pryor often had leading roles in B movies in the 1930s and 1940s. He appeared in more than 50 films between 1930 and 1945, including the A picture Belle of the Nineties with Mae West.

== Radio ==
Pryor was host of "a number of prestigious network programs," including The United States Steel Hour, The Pause That Refreshes,, The Coca-Cola Summer Show and The Screen Guild Theater. He starred as Dan McGarry in McGarry and His Mouse and was the producer of Cavalcade of America. He also had his own music program, featuring the Roger Pryor Orchestra.

== Advertising agency ==
In 1947, Pryor changed careers, becoming vice president in charge of broadcasting at Foote, Cone and Belding advertising agency.

== Personal life and death ==
Pryor was married to Priscilla Mitchell, the daughter of vaudeville star Bessie Clayton and theatre director Julian Mitchell; they had one daughter, also named Priscilla, before divorcing in 1936. He married, secondly, in 1936, actress Ann Sothern; they divorced in 1942.

Pryor died January 31, 1974, in Puerto Vallarta, Mexico.

== Selected filmography ==
- Moonlight and Pretzels (1933) as George Dwight
- I Like It That Way (1934) as Jack Anderson
- I'll Tell the World (1934) as William S. Briggs
- Romance in the Rain (1934) as Charles Denton
- Gift of Gab (1934) as Kelly
- Belle of the Nineties (1934) as Tiger Kid
- Wake Up and Dream (1934) as Charles Sullivan
- Lady by Choice (1934) as Johnny Mills
- Strange Wives (1934) as Jimmy King
- Straight from the Heart (1935) as Andy MacLean
- One Frightened Night (1935) as Masked Killer (uncredited)
- Dinky (1935) as Tom Marsden
- The Headline Woman (1935) as Bob Grayson
- The Girl Friend (1935) as George Thorne
- The Case of the Missing Man (1935) as Jimmy Hudson
- 1,000 Dollars a Minute (1935) as Wally Jones
- To Beat the Band (1935) as Larry Barry
- The Return of Jimmy Valentine (1936) as Gary Howard
- Ticket to Paradise (1936) as Terry Dodd aka Jack Doe
- Missing Girls (1936) as Jimmie Dugan
- Sitting on the Moon (1936) as Danny West
- The Man They Could Not Hang (1939) as District Attorney Drake
- Sued for Libel (1939) as District Attorney Willard Corbin
- The Man with Nine Lives (1940) as Dr. Tim Mason
- The Lone Wolf Meets a Lady (1940) as Pete Rennick
- A Fugitive from Justice (1940) as Dan Miller
- Gambling on the High Seas (1940) as Max Gates
- Money and the Woman (1940) as Charles Patterson
- Glamour for Sale (1940) as Jim Daly
- She Couldn't Say No (1940) as Wallace Turnbull
- Bowery Boy (1940) as J. R. Mason
- South of Panama (1941) as Mike Lawrence
- Power Dive (1941) as Daniel McMasters
- Bullets for O'Hara (1941) as Mike O'Hara
- Gambling Daughters (1941) as Chance Landon
- The Richest Man in Town (1941) as Tom Manning
- Flying Blind (1941) as Rocky Drake
- The Officer and the Lady (1941) as Johnny Davis
- So's Your Aunt Emma (1942) as Terry Connors
- I Live on Danger (1942) as Bert Jannings
- Smart Alecks (1942) as Joe Reagan
- A Man's World (1942) as Bugsy Nelson
- Lady Bodyguard (1943) as George MacAlister
- Submarine Alert (1943) as G. B. Fleming
- Thoroughbreds (1944) as Harold Matthews
- The Kid Sister (1945) as Waldo Barnes
- The Cisco Kid Returns (1945) as John Harris
- High Powered (1945) as Rod Farrell
- Identity Unknown (1945) Rocks Donally
- Scared Stiff (1945) as Richardson
- The Man from Oklahoma (1945) as Jim Gardner (final film role)
