= Dennis O'Keefe =

American actor (1908–1968)

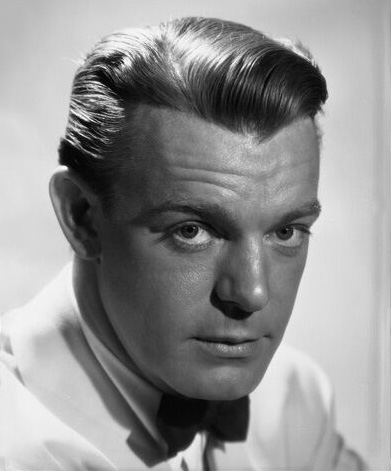
- O'Keefe in 1940
- Born: Edward Vance Flanagan; March 29, 1908; Fort Madison, Iowa, U.S.
- Died: August 31, 1968 (aged 60); Santa Monica, California, U.S.
- Resting place: Forest Lawn Memorial Park, Glendale, California
- Other names: Bud Flanagan; Jonathan Rix; Al Everett Dennis
- Occupations: Actor, screenwriter
- Years active: 1930–1967
- Spouse(s): Louise Stanley (m. 1937; div. 1938) Steffi Duna (m. 1940)
- Children: 2
- Parent: Edward Flanagan

Dennis O'Keefe (born Edward Vance Flanagan; March 29, 1908 – August 31, 1968) was an American actor.

== Early years ==
O'Keefe was born in Fort Madison, Iowa, as Edward Vance Flanagan, the son of Edward J. Flanagan and Charlotte Flanagan (née Ravenscroft), both vaudevillians of Irish descent. As a small child, O'Keefe joined his parents' act and later wrote skits for the stage. He attended the University of Southern California but left midway through his sophomore year after his father died.

== Career ==
O'Keefe continued his father's vaudeville act for several years after the father's death. He started in films as an extra in 1931 and appeared in numerous films under the name Bud Flanagan. After his role in Saratoga (1937), Clark Gable recommended O'Keefe to Metro-Goldwyn-Mayer, which signed him to a contract in 1937 and renamed him Dennis O'Keefe.

His film roles were bigger after that, starting with The Bad Man of Brimstone (1938) opposite Wallace Beery, and the lead role in Burn 'Em Up O'Connor (1939). He left MGM around 1940 but continued to work in mostly low-budget productions. He often played the tough guy in action and crime dramas, but was known as a comic actor as well as a dramatic lead. He gained great attention with a showy role in The Story of Dr Wassell and became a comedy star. He expressed interest in expanding into direction. In the mid-1940s, he was under a five-year contract to Edward Small. O'Keefe starred in film-noir classics such as T-Men and Raw Deal, both directed by Anthony Mann. In a 1946 newsreel following Howard Hughes' calamitous plane wreck into a neighbor's Beverly Hills house, O'Keefe can be seen walking through the home inspecting the damage.

In 1950, O'Keefe starred in the radio program T-Man on CBS. Also in the 1950s, he did some directing and wrote mystery stories. During the 1950s, O'Keefe made guest appearances as himself, or in acting roles, on episodes of a number of television series, such as Justice, The Ford Show, Studio 57, and Climax!. In 1957, he was to be the permanent host of Suspicion, an anthology TV series in which 10 episodes were produced by Alfred Hitchcock. After two episodes, he left the series and was not replaced. From 1959 to 1960, he was the star of The Dennis O'Keefe Show.

His Broadway credits include Never Live Over a Pretzel Factory (1964) and Never Too Late.

O'Keefe wrote screenplays under the pen name Jonathan Rix in the late 1940s and 1950s, and then as Al Everett Dennis in the 1960s. His Don't Pull Your Punches was produced by Warner Bros. In 1947, he was working on plans to co-produce and act in Drawn Sabers, another of his stories. He also wrote and directed Angela.

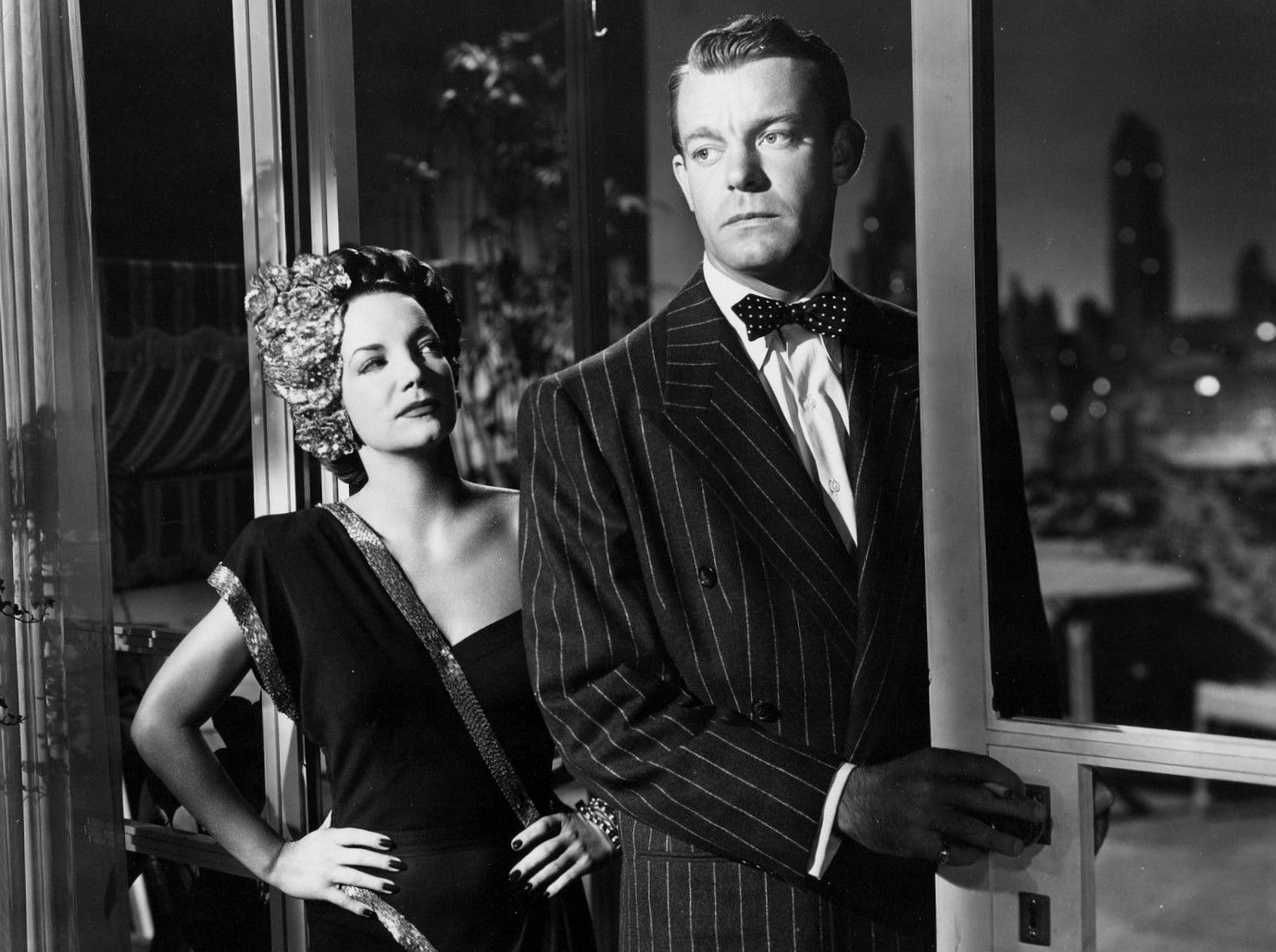
O'Keefe with Carmen Miranda in Doll Face (1946)

== Personal life and death ==
O'Keefe married actress Louise Stanley in 1937 but divorced her in 1938. In 1940, he married actress and dancer Steffi Duna. They had two children, Juliena and James.

A heavy cigarette smoker, O'Keefe died of lung cancer in 1968 at the age of 60 at St. John's Hospital in Santa Monica, California. He was buried at Wee Kirk O'the Heather at Forest Lawn Memorial Park in Glendale, California.

== Selected filmography ==
- Reaching for the Moon (1930) as Ship's Party Guest
- The Miracle Woman (1931) as Man in Audience
- The Man from Yesterday (1932) as Cafe Patron
- Gold Diggers of 1933 (1933) as Theatregoer
- Jimmy the Gent (1934) as Chester Coote
- Fog Over Frisco (1934) as Van Brugh
- A Feather in Her Hat (1935) as Theatregoer
- Mr Deeds Goes to Town (1936) as Courtroom Reporter
- Saratoga (1937) as Second Bidder/Dancer at Party
- The Bad Man of Brimstone (1938) as Jeffrey Burton
- Hold That Kiss (1938) as Tommy Bradford
- The Chaser (1938) as Thomas Z. 'Tom' Brandon
- Vacation from Love (1938) as W.D. 'Bill' Blair
- Burn 'Em Up O'Connor (1939) as Jerry O'Connor
- The Kid from Texas (1939) as William Quincy
- Unexpected Father (1939) as Jimmy Hanley
- That's Right – You're Wrong (1939) as Chuck Deems, the Band Manager
- Alias the Deacon (1940) as Johnny Sloan
- La Conga Nights (1940) as Steve Collins
- Pop Always Pays (1940) as Jeff Thompson
- Girl from Havana (1940) as Woody Davis
- Arise, My Love (1940) as Shep
- I'm Nobody's Sweetheart Now (1940) as Tod Lowell
- You'll Find Out (1940) as Chuck Deems
- Bowery Boy (1940) as Dr. Tom O'Hara
- Topper Returns (1941) as Bob
- Mr. District Attorney (1941) as P. Cadwallader Jones
- Broadway Limited (1941) as Dr. Harvey North
- Lady Scarface (1941) as Lt. Bill Mason
- Week-End for Three (1941) as Jim Craig
- The Affairs of Jimmy Valentine (1942) as Mike Jason
- Moonlight Masquerade (1942) as John Bennett Jr.
- Hangmen Also Die! (1943) as Jan Horak
- Tahiti Honey (1943) as Mickey Monroe
- Good Morning, Judge (1943) as David Barton
- The Leopard Man (1943) as Jerry Manning
- Hi Diddle Diddle (1943) as Sonny Phyffe
- The Fighting Seabees (1944) as Lt. Cmdr. Robert Yarrow
- Up in Mabel's Room (1944) as Gary Ainsworth
- The Story of Dr. Wassell (1944) as Benjamin 'Hoppy' Hopkins
- Sensations of 1945 (1944) as Junior Crane
- Abroad with Two Yanks (1944) as Jeff Reardon
- The Affairs of Susan (1945) as Bill Anthony
- Earl Carroll Vanities (1945) as Danny Baldwin
- Brewster's Millions (1945) as Montague L. 'Monty' Brewster
- Getting Gertie's Garter (1945) as Dr. Kenneth B. Ford
- Doll Face (1945) as Michael Francis 'Mike' Hannegan
- Her Adventurous Night (1946) as Bill Fry
- Mr. District Attorney (1947) as Steve Bennett
- Dishonored Lady (1947) as Dr. David S. Cousins
- T-Men (1947) as Dennis O'Brien - aka Vannie Harrigan
- Raw Deal (1948) as Joe Sullivan
- Walk a Crooked Mile (1948) as Daniel F. O'Hara
- Siren of Atlantis (1949) as Capt. Jean Morhange
- Cover Up (1949) as Sam Donovan
- The Great Dan Patch (1949) as David Palmer
- Abandoned (1949) as Mark Sitko
- The Eagle and the Hawk (1950) as Whitney Randolph
- Woman on the Run (1950) as Dan Legget
- The Company She Keeps (1951) as Larry Collins
- Follow the Sun (1951) as Chuck Williams
- Passage West (1951) as Jacob Karns
- One Big Affair (1952) as Jimmy Donovan
- Everything I Have Is Yours (1952) as Alec Tacksbury
- The Lady Wants Mink (1953) as Jim Connors
- The Fake (1953) as Paul Mitchell
- Drums of Tahiti (1954) as Mike Macklin
- The Diamond (1954, aka The Diamond Wizard) as Joe Dennison
- Angela (1954) as Steve Catlett
- Las Vegas Shakedown (1955) as Joe Barnes
- Chicago Syndicate (1955) as Barry Amsterdam
- Inside Detroit (1956) as Blair Vickers
- Dragoon Wells Massacre (1957) as Capt. Matt Riordan
- Lady of Vengeance (1957) as William T. Marshall
- Sail Into Danger (1957) as Steve Ryman
- All Hands on Deck (1961) as Lt. Cmdr. Brian
