= Criminal Court (film) =

1946 film by Robert Wise

- Theatrical release poster
- Directed by: Robert Wise
- Written by: Earl Felton
- Screenplay by: Lawrence Kimble
- Produced by: Martin Mooney
- Starring: Tom Conway; Martha O'Driscoll; June Clayworth
- Cinematography: Frank Redman
- Edited by: Robert Swink
- Music by: Paul Sawtell
- Production company: RKO Radio Pictures
- Distributed by: RKO Radio Pictures
- Release dates: November 15, 1946 (Premiere-New York City); November 20, 1946 (U.S.)
- Running time: 60 minutes
- Country: United States
- Language: English

Criminal Court is a 1946 American crime drama film directed by Robert Wise and starring Tom Conway, Martha O'Driscoll and June Clayworth. It was produced and distributed by RKO Pictures.

Wise, who made the movie while under contract to RKO, called it "kind of nothing."

== Plot ==
Hotshot lawyer Steve Barnes is a candidate to be district attorney. His girlfriend Georgia Gale has a job singing for nightclub owner Vic Wright, a gangster who works for the mob boss, Marquette.

Steve has film footage of Vic and brother Frankie committing crimes. He rejects a $50,000 bribe made in the form of a campaign donation. Joan, his secretary, spies on Steve for the gangster. She witnesses a struggle for a gun and sees Vic accidentally shot dead.

Georgia is seen leaving the scene and is charged with murder. Marquette will have his stooge Joe West give false testimony to convict her unless Steve plays ball.

Steve realizes just in time that Joan is involved and calls her to the stand. West tries to shoot her, but is overcome. Joan tells what really happened and Georgia goes free.

== Cast ==
- Tom Conway as Steve Barnes
- Martha O'Driscoll as Georgia Gale
- June Clayworth as Joan Mason
- Robert Armstrong as Vic Wright
- Addison Richards as District Attorney Gordon
- Pat Gleason as Joe West
- Steve Brodie as Frankie Wright
- Robert Warwick as Marquette
- Phil Warren as Bill Brannegan
- Joe Devlin as Brownie
- Lee Bonnell as Gil Lambert
- Robert Clarke as Dance Director

== Production ==
Filming took place in March 1946.

== Reception ==
Variety called it a "neat courtroom melodrama" with "excellent pace".
