= Sid Rogell =

American film producer

- Born: January 16, 1900; St. Joseph, Missouri, U.S.
- Died: November 15, 1973 (aged 73); Los Angeles, California, U.S.
- Resting place: Hillside Memorial Park Cemetery
- Occupation: Producer
- Years active: 1925 - 1959 (film)

Sid Rogell (January 16, 1900 – November 15, 1973) was an American film producer. He became RKO's production chief in 1948 following Dore Schary's departure but only lasted two years. He was the nephew of the director Albert S. Rogell. He was married to the actress June Clayworth.

== Selected filmography ==
- Among the Missing (1934)
- Name the Woman (1934)
- The Line-Up (1934)
- The Hell Cat (1934)
- Unknown Woman (1935)
- Murder, My Sweet (1944)
- The Devil Thumbs a Ride (1947)
- Born to Kill (1947)
- The Big Steal (1949)
- Payment on Demand (1951)
- The Company She Keeps (1951)
- My Forbidden Past (1951)
- On Dangerous Ground (1951)
- The Pace That Thrills (1952)
- At Sword's Point (1952)

== Bibliography ==
- Edmund G. Bansak. Fearing the Dark: The Val Lewton Career. McFarland, 2003.
