= Gerald Oliver Smith =

English actor (1892–1974)

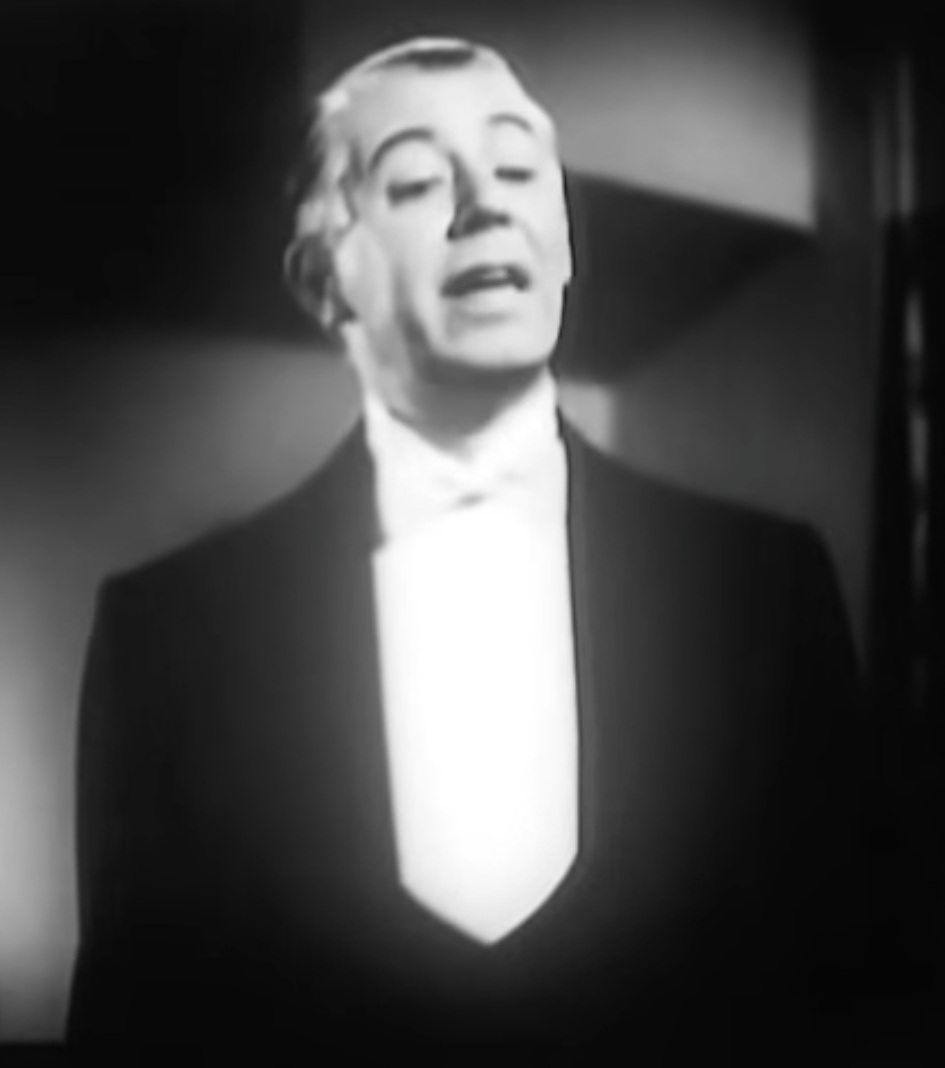
- Smith in Federal Fugitives (1941)
- Born: Gerald Wilson Oliver Smith; 26 June 1892; Sidcup, Kent, England
- Died: 28 May 1974 (aged 81); Woodland Hills, Los Angeles, U.S.
- Resting place: Pierce Brothers Valhalla Memorial Park
- Occupation: Actor
- Years active: 1917–1960

Gerald Wilson Oliver Smith (26 June 1892 – 28 May 1974) was an English-born actor who spent most of his career in the United States, both in New York City as a stage actor and in the Hollywood film industry.

== Biography ==
Born in Sidcup, Kent, England, Smith debuted as a music hall singer in London. He came to the United States as part of a London Gaiety Company production of To-night's the Night. His Broadway career began in 1916, and he appeared in, among other productions, three George Gershwin musicals: Lady Be Good (1924), Oh, Kay! (1928) and Pardon My English (1933). He also had bit parts in silent films, such as The Mysterious Miss Terry (1917), and went on to appear in talkies and musicals in the 1930s and 1940s. He began working in Hollywood in 1937, and was frequently typecast as a genteel butler or pompous English gentleman. His film appearances included Casablanca, National Velvet, and One Hundred Men and a Girl. Smith appeared in more than one hundred movies, often in small roles, and was not always mentioned in the credits. From 1952 to 1956 he made several television appearances. He retired to the Motion Picture & Television Country House and Hospital late in life.

== Death ==
On 28 May 1974, Smith died in Woodland Hills, Los Angeles, at age 81. He is buried at Pierce Brothers Valhalla Memorial Park, North Hollywood, Los Angeles.

== Filmography ==
- The Mysterious Miss Terry (1917) as John Quig (film debut)
- School for Wives (1925) as Ronald Van Stuyvesant
- The Strange Case (1931, Short)
- Kissing Time (1933, Short) as Ferdie
- His Double Life (1933) (uncredited)
- They're Off (1936, Short) as Race Track Man
- The Man I Marry (1936) as Throckton Van Cortland
- Girl Overboard (1937) as Harvey
- When You're in Love (1937) as Gerald Meeker
- Top of the Town (1937) as Borden Executive
- The Lady Escapes (1937) as Reggie Farnworth
- The Big Boodle (1937) as Butler (uncredited)
- One Hundred Men and a Girl (1937) as Stevens
- Behind the Mike (1937) as Robert Ainesley
- The Lady Fights Back (1937) as Sir Daniel McAndrews
- Fight for Your Lady (1937) as 1st Creditor (uncredited)
- Crashing Hollywood (1938) as Joe, Mike's Butler (uncredited)
- Invisible Enemy (1938) as Bassett
- Blond Cheat (1938) - Bankers as Mike's Butler (uncredited)
- Gateway (1938) as Englishman
- Vacation from Love (1938) as Skewes, the Butler (uncredited)
- The Law West of Tombstone (1938) as Delmonico Maitre d' (uncredited)
- Three Smart Girls Grow Up (1939) as Guest (uncredited)
- The Kid from Texas (1939) as Noel - Bertie's Butler (uncredited)
- Bridal Suite (1939) as Purser (uncredited)
- Bachelor Mother (1939) as Hennessy (uncredited)
- Pride and Prejudice (1940) as Col. Fitzwilliam (uncredited)
- Dulcy (1940) - Huggins as the Butler (uncredited)
- Kiddie Kure (1940, Short) as Evans, the Butler
- You're the One (1941) as Hotel Clerk
- Federal Fugitives (1941) as Hobbs - Lane's Butler
- The Singing Hill (1941) as Dada the Butler
- Puddin' Head (1941) as Hudson - Butler
- Mrs. Miniver (1942) as Car Dealer (uncredited)
- Beyond the Blue Horizon (1942) as Chadwick
- Tish (1942) as Parkins (uncredited)
- Casablanca (1942) as Pickpocketed Englishman (uncredited)
- Forever and a Day (1943) as Man in Air Raid Shelter
- Thumbs Up (1943) as Hopeless Orchestra Leader (uncredited)
- Heaven Can Wait (1943) as Smith - Van Cleve's Second Butler (uncredited)
- Jane Eyre (1943) as Footman at Gateshead (uncredited)
- Knickerbocker Holiday (1944) as English Colonist (uncredited)
- Casanova Brown (1944) as Chauffeur (uncredited)
- Mrs. Parkington (1944) as Taylor
- National Velvet (1944) as Photographer
- The Man in Half Moon Street (1945) as Pharmacy Clerk (uncredited)
- Sunbonnet Sue (1945) as Masters
- The Sailor Takes a Wife (1945) as Gerald - Freddie's Butler
- Rainbow Over Texas (1946) as Larkin the Butler
- The Verdict (1946) as Artist (uncredited)
- Moss Rose (1947) as Hotel Desk Clerk (uncredited)
- Singapore (1947) as Englishman (uncredited)
- Linda, Be Good (1947) as Butler
- Her Husband's Affairs (1947) as Harold - Winterbottom's Butler (uncredited)
- Enchantment (1948) as Willoughby
- That Forsyte Woman (1949) as Wilson
- Belle of Old Mexico (1950) as Matthews (uncredited)
- Lullaby of Broadway (1951) as Salesman at Fur Shop (uncredited)
- As Young as You Feel (1951) as McKinleys' Butler (uncredited)
- Dick Turpin's Ride (1951) as Burfrey (uncredited)
- Adventures of Wild Bill Hickok (1952, TV) as Equerry
- Lady in the Iron Mask (1952) (uncredited)
- Captain Pirate (1952) as Heatherstone (uncredited)
- Sword of Venus (1953) as Sir Norman Blandish (final film) (uncredited)
- My Little Margie (1955, TV) as Blivens, the Butler
- The 20th Century-Fox Hour (1955–1956) as Wilson/Bates
- The Barbara Stanwyck Show (1960, TV) (final appearance)
