= The Son of Monte Cristo =

1940 film by Rowland V. Lee

- DVD cover
- Directed by: Rowland V. Lee
- Written by: George Bruce
- Produced by: Edward Small
- Starring: Louis Hayward; Joan Bennett; George Sanders
- Cinematography: George Robinson
- Edited by: Arthur Roberts
- Music by: Edward Ward
- Production company: Edward Small Productions
- Distributed by: United Artists
- Release dates: December 4, 1940 (New York City); February 10, 1941 (U.S.)
- Running time: 102 minutes
- Country: United States
- Language: English
- Budget: $650,000
- Box office: 2,213,068 admissions (France, 1946)

The Son of Monte Cristo is a 1940 American black-and-white swashbuckler adventure film from United Artists, produced by Edward Small, directed by Rowland V. Lee, that stars Louis Hayward, Joan Bennett, and George Sanders. The Small production uses the same sets and many of the same cast and production crew as his previous year's production of The Man in the Iron Mask. Hayward returned to star in Small's The Return of Monte Cristo (1946).

The film takes its name from The Son of Monte Cristo, the unofficial sequel to The Count of Monte Cristo, written by Jules Lermina in 1881. Using elements from several romantic swashbucklers of the time such as The Prisoner of Zenda and The Mark of Zorro the production also mirrors the situation of Continental Europe in 1939–1940.

== Plot ==
In 1865, the proletarian General Gurko Lanen (George Sanders) becomes the behind-the-scenes dictator of the Grand Duchy of Lichtenburg located in the Balkans. Gurko suppresses the clergy and the free press and imprisons the Prime Minister Baron Von Neuhoff (Montagu Love). The rightful ruler of the Grand Duchy, the Grand Duchess Zona (Joan Bennett), hopes to get aid from Napoleon III of France and makes her escape, pursued by a troop of Hussars loyal to Gurko. While on a hunting trip, the visiting Count of Monte Cristo (Louis Hayward), rescues her. The Count escorts the Grand Duchess Zona to a neutral country, but Gurko's Hussars violate international neutrality to return the Grand Duchess and her lady-in-waiting back to Lichtenburg.

The Count has become romantically enamored of Zona and undertakes to help her, visiting the Grand Duchy, where he falls in with the underground resistance movement of Lichtenburg. He befriends the loyal Lt. Dorner (Clayton Moore) of the palace guard, who knows a variety of secret passages leading from the Grand Ducal Palace to the catacombs of the Grand Duchy.

Discovering that Baron Von Neuhoff is to be executed. Posing as a cowardly foppish international banker, the Count gains entry to the palace, as he was previously asked for a large loan of French francs by Gurko. There he overhears Gurko meeting with the French Ambassador (Georges Renavent) who raises the issue of human rights in the Grand Duchy. Gurko counters, saying he is signing a non aggression pact with Russia protecting Lichtenburg from any French threats. Gurko schemes to gain the nation's loyalty by marrying the Grand Duchess and keeping the pact with Russia a secret.

The Count becomes a masked freedom fighter The Torch (named after the underground newspaper) in order to save the Grand Duchy. He aims to right the wrongs and capture the heart of the woman he loves.

== Cast ==
- Louis Hayward as Edmond Dantès, Jr.
- Joan Bennett as Grand Duchess Zona
- George Sanders as Gen. Gurko Lanen
- Florence Bates as Countess Mathilde
- Lionel Royce as Col. Zimmerman
- Montagu Love as Baron Von Neuhoff
- Ian Wolfe as Conrad Stadt
- Clayton Moore as Lt. Fritz Dorner
- Ralph Byrd as William Gluck
- Georges Renavent as French Ambassador
- Michael Visaroff as Prince Pavlov
- Rand Brooks as Hans Mirbach
- Theodore Von Eltz as Captain
- James Seay as Lieutenant
- Henry Brandon as Sgt. Schultz
- Jack Mulhall as Schmidt
- Edward Keane as Turnkey
- Ernie Adams as Informer
- Stanley Andrews as Turnkey
- Maurice Cass as Tailor
- Michael Mark as Bishop
- Charles Trowbridge as Priest
- Wyndham Standing as Chamberlain
- Lionel Belmore as Innkeeper Hercules Snyder
- Charles Waldron as Kurt Mirbach
- Ted Billings as Townsman (uncredited)
- Dwight Frye as Pavlov's Secretary (uncredited)
- Lawrence Grant as The Baron (uncredited)

== Production ==
A sequel to The Count of Monte Cristo was announced almost immediately after the first film's success. At one stage Robert Donat, Melvyn Douglas and Douglas Fairbanks Jr. were named as stars; Jean Arthur was also being considered for a lead role.

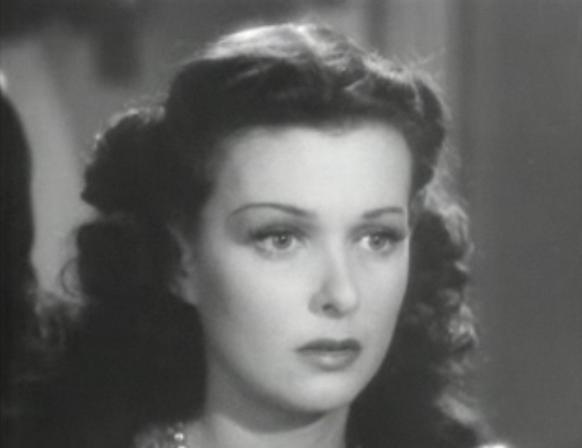
Joan Bennett as Grand Duchess Zona

== Reception ==
The Son of Monte Cristo was widely panned by critics. Bosley Crowther of The New York Times called the film "just a routine retelling of a conventional sword-and-cape adventure tale" and "a juvenile masquerade, acted as such and strangely suggestive of a Flash Gordon serial in costume. The old Count should turn in his grave". Variety called it, "... (a) plodding offspring of a famed father ... Director Rowland V. Lee must share the pillory with writer George Bruce for 'The Son', although Louis Hayward and Joan Bennett in the top roles are not far from the stocks".

Harrison's Reports wrote: "Patrons who remember how entertaining was 'The Count of Monte Cristo' may flock to the box-office to see this picture. But if they expect to find this as exciting as the first, they will be disappointed. The story is routine and the plot developments obvious; moreover, even though the players try hard, they are not very convincing". Film Daily wrote: "Picture should entertain the average audience, although it has several faults. The dialogue is static in places and the situations are telegraphed. In addition, Miss Bennett and George Sanders are not overly animated in their characterizations". John Mosher of The New Yorker wrote: The Son of Monte Cristo seems to be arranged for young persons, or for those of arrested mental development, who also should have a place in our considerations at this season".

== Awards ==
The film was nominated for an Academy Award for Best Art Direction by John DuCasse Schulze and Edward G. Boyle.

== Quotes ==
"When the spirit of justice is crushed in one country, men will rise to defend it in all countries" - Baron Von Neuhoff
