= The Fifth Musketeer =

- Promotional film poster
- Directed by: Ken Annakin
- Written by: David Ambrose; George Bruce
- Based on: novel The Vicomte of Bragelonne: Ten Years Later by Alexandre Dumas, père
- Produced by: Ted Richmond
- Starring: Beau Bridges; Sylvia Kristel; Ursula Andress; Cornel Wilde; Ian McShane; Lloyd Bridges; Alan Hale Jr. Helmut Dantine; Olivia de Havilland; José Ferrer; Rex Harrison
- Cinematography: Jack Cardiff
- Edited by: Malcolm Cooke
- Music by: Riz Ortolani
- Production companies: Sascha-Wien Films; Ted Richmond Productions
- Distributed by: Columbia Pictures
- Release date: 6 April 1979
- Running time: 104 min (US); 116 min (UK)
- Language: English
- Budget: $7 million

The Fifth Musketeer is a 1979 German-Austrian film adaptation of the last section of the 1847–1850 novel The Vicomte of Bragelonne: Ten Years Later by Alexandre Dumas, père, which is itself based on the French legend of the Man in the Iron Mask. It was released in Europe with the alternative title Behind the Iron Mask.

It was directed by Ken Annakin, and stars Beau Bridges as the twins (Louis XIV and Philippe of Gascony), Sylvia Kristel as Maria Theresa, Ursula Andress as Louise de La Vallière, Cornel Wilde as Charles d'Artagnan, Ian McShane as Nicolas Fouquet, Rex Harrison as Jean-Baptiste Colbert (Philippe's tutor), and Lloyd Bridges, José Ferrer and Alan Hale Jr. as the Three Musketeers. Olivia de Havilland made her final theatrical film role in a cameo appearance as the Queen Mother Anne of Austria.

== Plot ==
At the center of the action is Philippe of Gascony, the unjustly imprisoned and exiled twin brother of the French King Louis XIV. In order to hide his face from others, an iron mask was put over his head, which he cannot remove himself. The aging Charles D'Artagnan and his musketeer friends try to right this injustice and free the mysterious prisoner, because only he has a legitimate claim to the throne of France. These events lead to numerous confusions and intrigues at court.

== Cast ==
- Sylvia Kristel as Maria Theresa
- Ursula Andress as Louise de La Vallière
- Beau Bridges as Louis XIV/Philippe of Gascony
- Cornel Wilde as Charles de Batz de Castelmore d'Artagnan
- Ian McShane as Nicolas Fouquet
- Lloyd Bridges as Aramis
- José Ferrer as Athos
- Alan Hale Jr. as Porthos
- Olivia de Havilland as Anne of Austria
- Helmut Dantine as Spanish Ambassador
- Rex Harrison as Jean-Baptiste Colbert
- Bernard Bresslaw as Bernard
- Elisabeth Neumann-Viertel as Mother Superior
- Patrick Pinney as Captain of the Guards

== Production ==
Filming took place in September 1976 under the title Behind the Iron Mask to avoid confusion with a TV movie adaptation of Alexandre Dumas' The Vicomte of Bragelonne: Ten Years Later called The Man in the Iron Mask.

The film was shot in and around Vienna, Austria at locations including Schönbrunn Palace, Auersperg Palace, Votive Church, Liechtenstein Castle and Kreuzenstein Castle. Sylvia Kristel's lines were reportedly dubbed in by another actress. She was paid $300,000.

The cinematographer was Jack Cardiff.

In what may have been an instance of stunt casting, Alan Hale Jr. played the same character, Porthos, that his lookalike father, Alan Hale Sr., did in the 1939 film The Man in the Iron Mask. Hale Jr. also played Porthos in Lady in the Iron Mask (1952) and Porthos Jr. in At Sword's Point (1952).

This film was rated PG on release.

== Release ==
The film was not released for a number of years. It was felt this was due in part in the financial failure of another movie made by the Austrian production company, Sascha-Wien Films, A Little Night Music. It was also due to the fact that another adaptation, The Man in the Iron Mask, had recently aired on television.

Eventually the film's title was changed to The Fifth Musketeer, although the final movie had no affiliation with the hit Richard Lester films The Three Musketeers and The Four Musketeers other than their all being based on Dumas stories: the title was chosen to capitalize on the recent success of those films and inform audiences that it was the same characters involved in the plot.

== Reception ==
=== Critical ===
Vincent Canby of The New York Times wrote, "Though The Fifth Musketeer is loaded with intrigue, duels, large scale swordplay, heavy costumes and heavier décor, it is singularly without style or even excitement. In the center of it, Mr. Bridges the younger seems bewildered in the manner of someone unsure of his real identity."

Dale Pollock of Variety stated that the film "adds nothing new to the genre, deriving its inspiration totally from the 1939 United Artists release written by George Bruce, who is credited here along with Dumas", adding that director Ken Annakin "stifles The 5th Musketeer with ornate production values, deadly earnest swordplay and dialog as moth-eaten as the peasant costumes. The result? Yawnsville."

Gene Siskel of the Chicago Tribune gave the film two-and-a-half stars out of four and called it "one of those big, one-star-from-every-country productions. Such films invariably are badly directed... Director Ken Annakin is obliged to give every one of his stars a decent amount of screen time, and the result is a film that moves in fits and starts."

Kevin Thomas of the Los Angeles Times wrote, "There are some nice moments along the way from a largely nostalgic cast and some reasonably sumptuous settings, with the Schoenbrunn Palace standing in for Versailles. However, since Ken Annakin's direction and David Ambrose's script are uninspired, The Fifth Musketeer tends to be plodding."

Rick Groen of The Globe and Mail asked, "How does a movie this bad ever get made? ... actors recite their lines in a dull monotone and the direction is absolutely wooden; the reaction shots are so studied that one can almost hear the director counting out. Indeed, everyone's timing is way off, as if the whole picture were made in some Quaalude-induced stupor."

=== Annakin's assessment ===
In his 2001 autobiography, So You Wanna Be A Director?, Annakin agreed with the criticisms of the film, feeling he had not done a good job with the actors (in particular Ursula Andress and Kristel), as well as not translating the script to screen effectively.
