= The Man in the Iron Mask (1939 film) =

American adventure film by James Whale

- Directed by: James Whale
- Screenplay by: George Bruce
- Based on: The Vicomte of Bragelonne: Ten Years Later; 1848–50 by Alexandre Dumas
- Produced by: Edward Small
- Starring: Louis Hayward; Joan Bennett; Warren William; Joseph Schildkraut; Peter Cushing
- Cinematography: Robert H. Planck
- Edited by: Grant Whytock
- Music by: Lud Gluskin; Lucien Moraweck
- Production company: Edward Small Productions
- Distributed by: United Artists
- Release date: July 13, 1939 (United States)
- Running time: 96 minutes 113 minutes (uncut)
- Country: United States
- Language: English
- Budget: $1 million

The Man in the Iron Mask is a 1939 American adventure film very loosely adapted from the last section of the 1847–1850 novel The Vicomte de Bragelonne by Alexandre Dumas, père, which is itself based on the French legend of the Man in the Iron Mask.

The film was directed by James Whale and stars Louis Hayward as royal twins, Joan Bennett as Princess Maria Theresa, Warren William as d'Artagnan, and Joseph Schildkraut as Nicolas Fouquet. British actor Peter Cushing made his screen debut in a minor part.

During the 12th Academy Awards for films from 1939, the film was nominated for Best Music (Original Score) for Lud Gluskin and Lucien Moraweck. The award, however, went to Herbert Stothart for The Wizard of Oz.

== Plot ==
In 1638, King Louis XIII of France is delighted when his wife bears him a son, Louis, the heir to the throne. However, a few minutes later, a second son is born. Colbert (Walter Kingsford), the king's trusted adviser, persuades the king to secretly send the second child, Philippe, away to Gascony to be raised by his majesty's dear friend, d'Artagnan (Warren William), in order to avert a possible civil war later. Fouquet (Joseph Schildkraut), a mere cardinal's messenger at the time, finds out about the twin and uses this to advance his career. Twenty years later, he is the Minister of Finance under Louis XIV. The king is hated by the commoners for levying oppressive taxes and for executing them for not paying them.

Fouquet sends soldiers to force d'Artagnan and his people to pay the taxes, though the old king had exempted him and his village from them. They are driven off, but return in much greater numbers and, with great difficulty, capture d'Artagnan, the three musketeers and Philippe. Louis is about to order their executions when Colbert tells him about Philippe's uncanny resemblance to him. As Louis is aware of an assassination attempt to take place that day (but not where or when), he makes Philippe impersonate him in exchange for his friends' lives. Philippe not only survives the ambush, he shows mercy to his would-be killers and is cheered by the people. Princess Maria Theresa (Joan Bennett), whom Louis is to wed to seal an alliance with Spain, finds this new Louis much more attractive than the real one. However, when she discovers that Louis is having an affair with Mademoiselle de la Valliere (Marion Martin), she threatens to return to Spain. Philippe, as the king, persuades her to stay in Paris and they are officially betrothed.

When the truth is discovered, Louis has Philippe imprisoned with an iron mask placed on his head, hoping that Philippe's beard will grow inside the mask and eventually suffocate him. Philippe is rescued by the musketeers, who break into the sleeping Louis's chamber and imprison him in the mask. The musketeers drag him away and lock him in the Bastille, where the jailers mistake him for Phillippe, and whip him.

When Louis manages to get a message to Fouquet, he is freed, and a chase by coach ensues to stop Philippe from marrying Maria Theresa and taking Louis' place on the throne. The coach is waylaid by the musketeers, who all die heroically, but Fouquet and the real Louis XIV are also killed when the driverless coach plunges off a cliff. The mortally wounded d'Artagnan survives long enough to exclaim "God Save the King!" at Philippe's wedding, and then falls dead. Philippe finally assumes the throne.

== Cast ==
- Louis Hayward as King Louis XIV / Philippe of Gascony
- Joan Bennett as Princess Maria Theresa
- Warren William as d'Artagnan
- Joseph Schildkraut as Fouquet
- Alan Hale Sr. as Porthos
- Miles Mander as Aramis
- Bert Roach as Athos
- Walter Kingsford as Colbert
- Marion Martin as Mademoiselle de la Valliere (credited as Marian Martin)
- Montagu Love as the Spanish ambassador
- Doris Kenyon as Queen Anne
- Albert Dekker as King Louis XIII
- Nigel De Brulier as Cardinal Richelieu
- Boyd Irwin as Lord High Constable of France
- Howard Brooks as Cardinal Mazarin
- Reginald Barlow as Jean Paul
- Lane Chandler as Captain of Fouquet's Guards
- Wyndham Standing as Doctor
- Dorothy Vaughan as Midwife
- Sheila Darcy as Maria, Theresa's Maid
- Robert Milasch as Torturer
- D'Arcy Corrigan as Tortured Prisoner
- Harry Woods as First Officer
- Peter Cushing as Second Officer
- Ted Billings as Prisoner (uncredited)
- Dwight Frye as Fouquet's Valet (uncredited)

== Production ==
The film was the third movie producer Edward Small made under his new agreement for United Artists. James Whale was signed as director in September 1938. Douglas Fairbanks, Jr., whose father had starred as D'Artagnan in the 1929 epic version The Iron Mask, was originally announced as male star and met with director James Whale. However producer Edward Small insisted on Louis Hayward, who had just made The Duke of West Point for him.

Louis Hayward played D'Artagnan in a gender-switched 1952 remake entitled Lady in the Iron Mask with Patricia Medina in the titular role and Alan Hale, Jr. as Porthos, the part his father Alan Hale, Sr. had portrayed in the 1939 version. In what may have been another instance of stunt casting, Hale Jr. played Porthos in the 1979 film The Fifth Musketeer (which is also based on The Man in the Iron Mask).

== Reception ==
Frank S. Nugent called the film "a moderately entertaining costume piece" with "an overfondness for pageantry and stiff heroics." He criticized the casting of Marion Martin as "outright absurd" and called her performance "artless" and "rather hopeless". Variety called the film "a highly entertaining adventure" with "excellent" direction. Harrison's Reports declared it "good mass entertainment" with a "charming" romance. Film Daily called it "a vivid picturization of Alexandre Dumas' novel" with Hayward's "best screen work to date." John Mosher of The New Yorker wrote, "The piece belongs to the old school of things and the Douglas Fairbanks of 1929, but Douglas Fairbanks is not here, and the swordplay, the hard riding, the desperate escapes seem to demand him. Louis Hayward can give a modern effete touch when that is needed in the double role he has, but he can't compete with his rapier or his acrobatics."

== Influence ==
The first film adaptation of Dumas' novel to allow for the lasting triumph of the good twin over the evil twin was Douglas Fairbanks' 1929 version of the tale, The Iron Mask (although in this case the good twin was the one already on the throne, reared under the tutelage of D'Artagnan, and it was he who had to be rescued when the evil twin was put onto the throne). The 1939 version flips this around so that the evil twin, Louis, sits on the throne and the good twin, Phillipe, is raised by D'Artagnan and must eventually win the throne. The staging of several other scenes are borrowed from the 1929 version, most importantly the ending. The ending of the 1939 version, with the ghosting of the figures of the four musketeers together (presumably in heaven), is a direct homage to the ending of the 1929 Douglas Fairbanks' film in which Athos, Porthos, and Aramis greet D'Artagnan upon his death and they in a ghosted image head off together for the "greater adventure beyond."

Most subsequent film versions, including the 1977 version and the 1998 version, have followed the basic outline of the 1939 film (and its borrowings from the 1929 version), not of the original novel.

The English band Iron Maiden was named by founder Steve Harris after seeing the film.
