= The Return of Monte Cristo (1946 film) =

1946 film by Henry Levin

- Directed by: Henry Levin
- Screenplay by: George Bruce; Alfred Neumann
- Story by: Curt Siodmak; Arnold Lippschitz
- Produced by: Edward Small; Grant Whytock
- Starring: Louis Hayward; Barbara Britton; George Macready
- Cinematography: Charles Lawton Jr.
- Edited by: Richard Fantl
- Music by: Lucien Moraweck
- Production company: Edward Small Productions
- Distributed by: Columbia Pictures
- Release date: December 19, 1946
- Running time: 92 minutes
- Country: United States
- Language: English
- Budget: $658,284

The Return of Monte Cristo is a 1946 American historical adventure film directed by Henry Levin and starring Louis Hayward, Barbara Britton and George Macready. It was produced by Edward Small for distribution by Columbia Pictures. A swashbuckler, it is a sequel to The Count of Monte Cristo (1934) and The Son of Monte Cristo (1940), the latter of which also stars Hayward.

== Plot ==
The grandson of the Count of Monte Cristo is falsely accused of a crime and imprisoned on Devil's Island. He escapes and seeks revenge against those responsible for his imprisonment. In 1868 Paris, Edmond Dantes (Louis Hayward) has just completed his education as a medical doctor, when he is informed by Professor François Duval (Henry Stephenson) that he is really the grand nephew of the original Count of Monte Cristo and is due to inherit the lands and title of his grand uncle as the rightful heir. While on the train to Marseilles to register with the probate court, Dantes provides medical aid to the beautiful Angele (Barbara Britton) who was injured from falling luggage.

Upon arriving at the probate court with Professor Duval, Dantes is arrested and accused of forgery. Three villains — Judge Jean Lafitte (Ludwig Donath), banker Emil Blanchard (Ray Collins) and Chief of the Sûreté Henri de la Roche (George Macready) — conspire to rob Edmond Dantes of his inheritance by declaring the late Count’s lawful will to be a forgery and installing Blanchard’s daughter, Angele, as the heir to the fortune instead. Professor Duval is killed by La Roche's henchmen, and Dantes is imprisoned on Devil’s Island under the false name of Louis Bresseau.

While in prison, Dantes is beaten when he insists on using his real name, but he befriends a famous actor Bombelles (Steven Geray), who gives him hope to keep living. Dantes finds an orchid growing on the island that mimics the symptoms of the bubonic plague and the two men ingest the flower. The guards, terrified of the plague, send them to an isolated island to die, and from there they successfully make their escape. Eventually, the two make their way to France, where Bombelles teaches Dantes how to disguise himself. Then they set about to reveal the corruption of the three villains who swindled Dantes of his inheritance.

First, Dantes disguises himself as a hunched back detective named Barbaras Bloom who tells Henri de la Roche that Dantes escaped and is at large in France. La Roche pays Bloom to find Dantes. Then Dantes pretends to be a robber and steals back his family’s jewels from Angele so she can identify him. The three conspirators panic when Angele tells them she has seen Dantes. Bloom returns to La Roche with one of the jewels pretending to need a description of Dantes. As La Roche will be leaving Marseilles, he arranges for Bloom to meet with Judge Lafitte.

Next, Bloom visits Judge Lafitte and tells him that Dantes can be found hiding at the Chateau d'If. Before they embark, Bloom offers Lafitte tea made with the orchid flower. When they reach the chateau, Dantes reveals himself and locks up Lafitte until he confesses. When Lafitte begins to show symptoms of the plague, he panics and tells Dantes the truth, including that Angele is innocent of complicity in their crimes, but he dies of a heart attack before he can sign a confession.

La Roche now suspects that Bloom is really Dantes, and he pressures Blanchard to force Angele to marry him immediately so he can take control of the Cristo estate. Dantes disguises himself as the Emperor in order to visit Angele to warn her of Blanchard and La Roche’s plans. When La Roche tries to pressure her to sign the marriage contract, Angele puts him off. La Roche orders Blanchard to force Angele to sign the contract, or he will expose Blanchard’s fraud at the bank.

Dantes then disguises himself as an auditor and shows up at Blanchard’s bank to check his records. Blanchard panics and tries to move the money he embezzled back into the Cristo Trust. Meanwhile, Bombelles starts a rumor on the streets that Blanchard's bank is going bankrupt to trigger a run on the bank. Dantes confronts Blanchard right before the investors break in, carry off Blanchard, and kill him.

Dantes finds Angele praying in the church. He tells her that Blanchard committed crimes to provide for her, and he was evil and good at the same time. Angele promises to make restitution to Dantes. He warns her not to return home and offers to hide her. Meanwhile, La Roche has figured out that Bombelles is helping Dantes to disguise himself. He orders his men to find Bombelles.

Bombelles is captured and tortured. He finally reveals that Dantes and Angele are hiding at the Odeon Theater. La Roche takes Bombelles to the theater and confronts Dantes on the stage, threatening him with a gun. La Roche gloats over his misdeeds, revealing that he is related to Gérard de Villefort, Dantes’ great uncle’s old enemy. As he is preparing to shoot Dantes, a fist fight breaks out and he is overpowered by Dantes. Dantes then calls for the lights to be turned on, revealing that it was all a trap, and La Roche has admitted his crimes in front of an audience. The townspeople in the audience take La Roche to prison. Dantes asks Angele to marry him and she agrees.

== Cast ==
- Louis Hayward as Dantes
- George Macready as Henri de la Rouche
- Barbara Britton as Angela Picard
- Una O'Connor as Miss Beedle
- Henry Stephenson as Prof. Duval
- Steven Geray as Bombelles
- Ray Collins as Emil Blanchard
- Ludwig Donath as Judge Lafitte
- Ivan Triesault as Major Chavet
- Ethan Laidlaw as Cab Driver (uncredited)

== Production ==
Edward Small's previous two Monte Cristo films - The Count of Monte Cristo with Robert Donat and Son of Monte Cristo with Louis Hayward - were made through United Artists. However this one was financed with Columbia. It was done using an old commitment Small had with Louis Hayward. Hayward was paid $35,000; director Henry Levin's fee was $6,033. Small provided the package of a script and star, plus some partial funding, but he did not actively produce the film. 25% of the budget was Small's overhead; exclusive of that the film cost $526,627 of which $108,853 went on sc script, cast and direction, the rest on production.

Filming started June 1946.

== Reception ==
Reviews were positive.

Edward Small announced plans to star Louis Hayward in The Treasure of Monte Cristo but Glenn Langan played the role instead and Small was not involved.
