= Ralph Murphy (director) =

American film director (1895–1967)

Ralph Murphy (May 1, 1895 – February 10, 1967) was an American film and television director. Born in Rockville, Connecticut, Murphy was active in films from 1931 through 1962, with some work in television. From 1941 to 1944 he was married to Gloria Dickson, whom he directed in I Want a Divorce.

Television programs that Murphy directed included Mr. and Mrs. North.

Murphy was born in Rockville, Connecticut, and died in Los Angeles, California.

== Selected filmography ==
- The Big Shot (1931)
- Girl Without a Room (1933)
- Golden Harvest (1933)
- Song of the Eagle (1933)
- She Made Her Bed (1934)
- Menace (1934)
- The Notorious Sophie Lang (1934)
- Men Without Names (1935)
- The Man I Marry (1936)
- Top of the Town (1937)
- Our Neighbors - The Carters (1939)
- I Want a Divorce (1940)
- Pacific Blackout (1941)
- Mrs. Wiggs of the Cabbage Patch (1942)
- Night Plane from Chungking (1943)
- The Town Went Wild (1944)
- The Man in Half Moon Street (1945)
- How Doooo You Do!!! (1945)
- Sunbonnet Sue (1945)
- Mickey (1948)
- Red Stallion in the Rockies (1949)
- Dick Turpin's Ride (1951)
- Lady in the Iron Mask (1952)
- Captain Pirate (1952)
