= Erna Rubinstein =

Hungarian violinist (1903–1966)

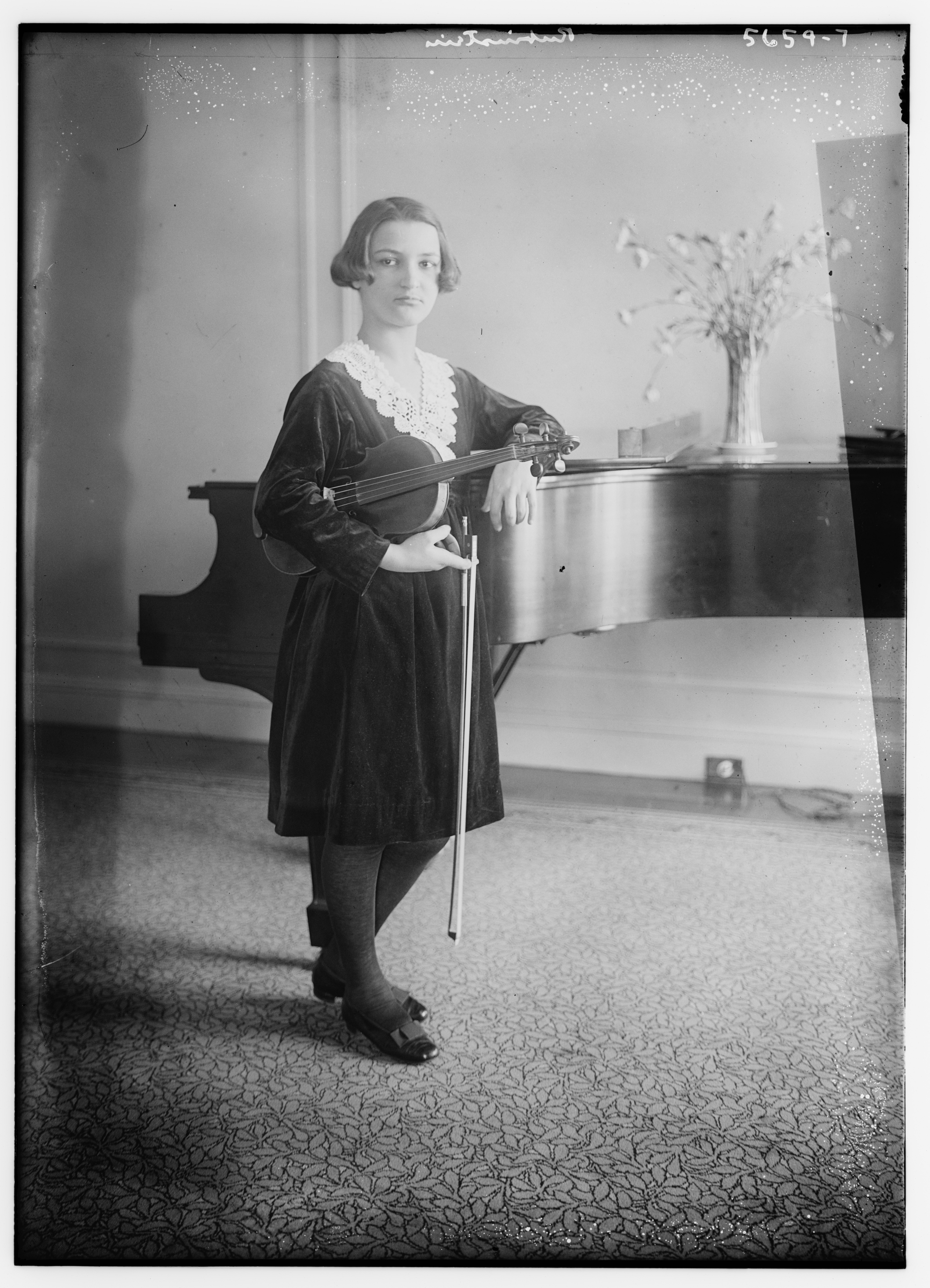
- Erna Rubinstein, from the Bain News Service collection, Library of Congress
- Born: Ernesztina Rubinstein; March 2, 1903; Sibiu, Hungary (today Romania)
- Died: 1966 (aged 62–63)
- Other names: Erna Rubenstein, Edna Ford
- Occupation: Violinist

Erna Rubinstein (March 2, 1903 – 1966), born Ernesztina Rubinstein, was a Hungarian violinist.

== Early life ==
Ernesztina Rubinstein was born in Sibiu in 1903. Her father was a "wealthy manufacturer"; her mother was a singer. She studied violin with József Füredi in Debrecen, and with Jenő Hubay at the Franz Liszt Academy of Music in Budapest, from 1913 to 1918. As a young woman violinist, she was often grouped with (and compared to) her peers, Nedyalka Simeonova(1901–1959) of Bulgaria, and Erika Morini (1904–1995) of Austria.

== Career ==
Rubinstein toured as a young violinist in Europe and the United States. She gave a recital at Carnegie Hall in 1922. "There is repose and poise in her performance," commented the New York Times reviewer Richard Aldrich, "but there is no lack of the brilliancy and spirit and rhythmic verve". She played in the American midwest and plains states in 1923 and 1924, and in California in 1925. She accompanied Frieda Hempel in a 1928 concert, and played in Minnesota and New York in 1929.

Rubinstein appeared in two films, Stolen Wednesday (1933, also known as Tokajerglut), and Under a Gypsy Moon (1938, a musical short). She was heard on the Bing Crosby radio program in 1939, and was a guest performer with the El Paso Orchestra that year.

== Personal life ==
In 1944 Rubinstein married an American screenwriter, George Bruce. Their short and tumultuous marriage ended in divorce in 1946, after widely publicized allegations of cruelty and violence, including an accusation that Bruce twisted Rubinstein's hand badly enough to affect her musical ability. In the 1950s, she lived quietly with her mother in the San Lorenzo, California, and used the name Edna Ford. She did some translation for Hungarian refugees in the East Bay area. She died in 1966, in her sixties.
