= The Pirates of Capri =

1949 film by Edgar George Ulmer, Giuseppe Maria Scotese

- Theatrical release poster
- Directed by: Edgar G. Ulmer
- Written by: Sidney Alexander; Giorgio Moser; Golfiero Colonna
- Produced by: Victor Pahlen
- Starring: Louis Hayward
- Cinematography: Anchise Brizzi
- Edited by: Renzo Lucidi
- Music by: Nino Rota
- Distributed by: Film Classics
- Release date: December 25, 1949 (U.S.)
- Running time: 94 minutes
- Countries: United States; Italy
- Language: English

The Pirates of Capri (Italian: I pirati di Capri), released in the United Kingdom as The Masked Pirate, is a 1949 American-Italian international co-production swashbuckler film directed by Edgar G. Ulmer starring Louis Hayward. It was filmed on location in Italy.

== Plot ==
In Naples in 1798, foppish nobleman Count Amalfi (Louis Hayward), adviser to the Queen (Binnie Barnes), is secretly the heroic pirate Captain Sirocco, who leads a band of rebels to overthrow the aristocratic regime, dominated by villainous Police Chief Von Holstein (Massimo Serato).

== Cast ==
- Louis Hayward as Count Amalfi/Captain Sirocco
- Binnie Barnes as Queen Carolina
- Alan Curtis as Commodore Van Diel
- Massimo Serato as Von Holstein
- Mariella Lotti as Countess Mercedes
- Mikhail Rasumny as Pepino
- Virginia Belmont as Annette
- Franca Marzi as Carla
- William Tubbs as Pignatelli

== Critical reception ==
In a contemporary review, The New York Times wrote "the thundering noise, confusion and blood-letting of revolution comes too late to offset the pompous and dull make-believe that dominates," concluding that "Stuffy and obvious are the adjectives that best describe "The Pirates of Capri;" while more recently, TV Guide gave the film 2/4 stars, and wrote "Great action scenes and clever direction by Ulmer pull this one out of the doldrums."
