= The Flame Within (film) =

1935 film by Edmund Goulding

- Theatrical release poster
- Directed by: Edmund Goulding
- Screenplay by: Edmund Goulding
- Produced by: Edmund Goulding
- Starring: Ann Harding; Herbert Marshall; Maureen O'Sullivan; Louis Hayward; Henry Stephenson; Margaret Seddon
- Cinematography: James Wong Howe
- Edited by: Blanche Sewell
- Music by: Jerome Kern
- Production company: Metro-Goldwyn-Mayer
- Distributed by: Loew's Inc.
- Release date: May 17, 1935
- Running time: 72 minutes
- Country: United States
- Language: English

The Flame Within is a 1935 American drama film written and directed by Edmund Goulding. The film stars Ann Harding, Herbert Marshall, Maureen O'Sullivan, Louis Hayward, Henry Stephenson and Margaret Seddon. The film was released on May 17, 1935, by Metro-Goldwyn-Mayer.

== Plot ==
Lillian Belton, unsuccessfully attempts suicide by taking pills, and she is referred to a psychiatrist for therapy. While at the psychiatrist's, Lillian tries to jump out the window, and she is only saved by the psychiatrist, Dr. Mary White, stopping her. Dr. White learns that Lillian's troubles are connected to Jack Kerry, whom she contacted just before her attempt at the psychiatrist's office. Lillian loves Jack, but he is an alcoholic and does not love Lillian the way she loves him. Dr. White contacts Jack, and persuades him to seek treatment for his alcoholism. As Jack completes his treatment, he falls in love with Dr. White, but she reminds Jack of Lillian's need for him, and Jack and Lillian marry. Lillian's physician, Dr. Gordon Phillips, is also in love with Dr. White, but cannot convince her to leave her patients and her practice and place herself under his control. Dr. White encounters Lillian and Jack at a costume ball, and Jack manages to get a dance with Dr. White, as a suspicious Lillian looks on. Jack confesses his love for Dr. White, but she again reminds him of his marriage and commitment to Lillian. An enraged Lillian creates a scene with Dr. White, who uses this experience as a parallel of her and Dr. Phillips’ relationship. In the end, she tells Drs. Philips and Frasier “I'm not going on with the work.” “What are you going to do?” Philips asks. “You tell me,” she replies, laying her head on his shoulder.

== Cast ==
- Ann Harding as Dr. Mary White
- Herbert Marshall as Dr. Gordon Phillips
- Maureen O'Sullivan as Lillian Belton
- Louis Hayward as Jack Kerry
- Henry Stephenson as Dr. Jock Frazier
- Margaret Seddon as Mrs. Ida Grenfell
- George Hassell as Mr. Rigby
- Eily Malyon as Murdock
- Isabelle Keith as Nurse Carter

== Reception ==
Frank S Nugent reviewed the film for The New York Times on June 1, 1935: “Ann Harding turns her calm, clear gaze upon troubled souls and brings them peace…. (the film carries on to the conclusion “that feminine psychiatrists may be terribly clever about resolving other people's riddles but are pretty helpless when it comes to solving their own. …Giving Miss Harding her due as an actress, …the chief asset of the picture is the presence of Louis Hayward…who is making his initial screen appearance… Mr. Marshall really has very little to do.”

In her “Shots and Angles“ column in Maclean's August 1, 1935 issue, Ann Ross writes that the film “has very little style of any kind except possibly clothes style. The characters all talk too much, they are all crazily in love with the wrong people, and everyone rushes about in a state of suppressed or outright hysteria.…The heiress tries to climb out the window …. Psychiatrist Mary White pulls her back, cures her suicide complex, cures her lover's dipsomania, then goes all to pieces herself. Referring to her love, she cries 'The thrum, thrum, thrum of the orchestra lifted me right off the earth!' 'It’s got me, It’s got me, It’s got me!' Maureen O'Sullivan cries, referring to hers. They both sounded pretty silly.”

Writing for TCM in June 2014, Violet Levoit gives Harding credit for a performance that goes beyond the limits of the script: “(A) full and unfettered exploration of her character's dilemma was shackled by the newly powerful Hays Code limiting her sexuality and independence…. But Harding reads between the lines on the page and delivers a performance that speaks quiet volumes about what a woman gives up when she turns her will over to a man. Her mastery of craft turns an uncomplicated role into a complicated one.”
