= Walk a Crooked Mile =

1948 film by Gordon Douglas

- Theatrical release lobby card
- Directed by: Gordon Douglas
- Screenplay by: George Bruce
- Story by: Bertram Millhauser
- Produced by: Edward Small; Grant Whytock
- Starring: Louis Hayward; Dennis O'Keefe
- Narrated by: Reed Hadley
- Cinematography: Edward Colman; George Robinson
- Edited by: James E. Newcom
- Music by: Paul Sawtell
- Color process: Black and white
- Production company: Edward Small Productions
- Distributed by: Columbia Pictures
- Release date: September 2, 1948 (United States)
- Running time: 91 minutes
- Country: United States
- Language: English

Walk a Crooked Mile is a 1948 American anti-communist Cold War crime film, directed by Gordon Douglas, starring Dennis O'Keefe and Louis Hayward.

== Plot ==
Information comes to light of a Communist spy ring infiltrating the Lakeview Laboratory of Nuclear Physics, a southern California atomic research center. Federal Bureau of Investigation agent Dan O'Hara teams up with Scotland Yard detective Philip Grayson, to hunt down the perpetrators responsible for the leak. At least one of the scientists at the nuclear plant is suspected of being involved in the clandestine espionage operation and the two investigators set out to find the mole and work out how the complex formulas are being smuggled out.

== Cast ==
- Louis Hayward as Philip 'Scotty' Grayson
- Dennis O'Keefe as Daniel F. O'Hara
- Louise Allbritton as Dr. Toni Neva
- Carl Esmond as Dr. Ritter von Stolb
- Onslow Stevens as Igor Braun
- Raymond Burr as Krebs
- Art Baker as Dr. Frederick Townsend
- Lowell Gilmore as Dr. William Forrest
- Philip Van Zandt as Anton Radchek
- Charles Evans as Dr. Homer Allen
- Frank Ferguson as Carl Bemish
- Reed Hadley as Narrator
- Tamara Shayne as Mrs. Ecko (Landlady)
- Ray Teal as Police Sergeant

== Production ==
The film was one of the first Cold War movies and was made specifically to exploit the new anti-communist sentiment in the country after World War II. Producer Edward Smalls hoped to repeat the success he recently had with the film noirs T-Men and Raw Deal. It was director Gordon Douglas' first major production, after primarily making B movies for MGM.

The original title was Face of Treason, which was later changed to FBI vs Scotland Yard. FBI director J. Edgar Hoover requested it be renamed again, to FBI Meets Scotland Yard, but Small wanted no official collaboration with the agency, who could be overly controlling on cinematic projects. Hoover was involved with a big 1945 hit The House on 92nd Street, a movie about the FBI's pursuit and conquest of domestic Nazis that showcased the agency's methods and skills. By 1948, the House Un-American Activities Committee hearings about communist influence on the country were underway and the FBI wanted a movie about this hot new topic, but Small refused to let Hoover co-produce the movie. Small also refused to grant the FBI power to approve the screenplay, so Hoover insisted all traces of the agency be removed from the film. Small refused once again, stating that fictional treatment of a public agency was legitimate. The only concession Small made was regarding the title and as a consequence The New York Times published a letter from Hoover disavowing any connection to the film and stating that he had not sanctioned it.

Exteriors are mostly from San Francisco but the film starts with exteriors shot in Brand Boulevard, Glendale, California.

== Reception ==
When the film was released, The New York Times film critic, Bosley Crowther, while giving the film a mixed review, wrote well of the screenplay, "No use to speak of the action or the acting. It's strictly routine. But the plot is deliberately sensational."

The staff at Variety gave the film a favorable review, writing that the "Action swings to San Francisco and back to the southland, punching hard all the time under the knowledgeable direction of Gordon Douglas. On-the-site filming of locales adds authenticity. George Bruce has loaded his script with nifty twists that add air of reality to the meller doings in the Bertram Millhauser story. Dialog is good and situations believably developed, even the highly contrived melodramatic finale. Documentary flavor is forwarded by Reed Hadley's credible narration chore."
