= I Want a Divorce =

- Theatrical Poster
- Directed by: Ralph Murphy
- Written by: Frank Butler
- Produced by: George M. Arthur
- Starring: Joan Blondell; Dick Powell
- Cinematography: Ted Tetzlaff
- Edited by: LeRoy Stone
- Music by: Victor Young
- Distributed by: Paramount Pictures
- Release date: September 20, 1940
- Running time: 75 minutes
- Country: United States
- Language: English

I Want a Divorce is a 1940 Paramount film directed by Ralph Murphy. The screenplay was written by Frank Butler (based on a story by Adela Rogers St. Johns). The film starred then-married actors Joan Blondell and Dick Powell, who would later divorce in real life. Co-star Gloria Dickson and director Murphy were also later married to one another and divorced.

== Plot ==
Alan and Geraldine MacNally are a married couple, who are doubting if they did the right thing by marrying each other. Meanwhile, David and Wanda Holland are in the final stages of their divorce. It so happens Alan is the attorney who arranges their divorce. This makes him and Geraldine fall even further apart. Everything changes when Wanda commits suicide after she loses custody of her son. The MacNallys then start thinking about what is really important to them.

== Cast ==
- Joan Blondell – Geraldine MacNally (née Brokaw)
- Dick Powell – Alan MacNally
- Gloria Dickson – Wanda Holland
- Frank Fay – Jeff Gilman
- Jessie Ralph – Grandma Brokaw
- Harry Davenport – Grandpa Brokaw
- Conrad Nagel – David Holland Sr.
- Dorothy Burgess – Peppy Gilman
- Sidney Blackmer – Erskine Brandon
- Louise Beavers – Celestine
- Mickey Kuhn – David Holland Jr.

== Production ==
Blondell and Powell were actually married offscreen from 1936 to 1944.
