= Absolute Quiet =

1936 film by George B. Seitz

- Directed by: George B. Seitz
- Screenplay by: Harry Clork
- Story by: George F. Worts
- Produced by: John W. Considine Jr.
- Starring: Lionel Atwill; Irene Hervey; Raymond Walburn; Stuart Erwin; Ann Loring; Louis Hayward
- Cinematography: Lester White
- Edited by: Conrad A. Nervig
- Music by: Franz Waxman
- Production company: Metro-Goldwyn-Mayer
- Distributed by: Loew's Inc.
- Release date: April 24, 1936
- Running time: 70 minutes
- Country: United States
- Language: English

Absolute Quiet is a 1936 American drama film directed by George B. Seitz and written by Harry Clork. The film stars Lionel Atwill, Irene Hervey, Raymond Walburn, Stuart Erwin, Ann Loring and Louis Hayward. A Metro-Goldwyn-Mayer picture, it was released on April 24, 1936, and distributed by Loew's Inc.

== Plot ==
Businessman Gerald Axton goes to his ranch to rest, having had a near-heart-attack due to business worries. But while there (with his female assistant who makes his heart flutter as much as his business worries), a pair of escaped criminals crashes the party, as well as a plane load of passengers who literally crash in. Coincidentally, the plane was carrying the state's governor, whom Axton was at odds with, Axton's ex-paramour and her lover, whom Axton was sending away under false pretenses, and a reporter willing to write up all the sordid details. - Ron Kerrigan

== Cast ==
- Lionel Atwill as G.A. Axton
- Irene Hervey as Laura Tait
- Raymond Walburn as Governor Pruden
- Stuart Erwin as 'Chubby' Rudd
- Ann Loring as Zelda Tadema
- Louis Hayward as Gregory Bengard
- Wallace Ford as Jack
- Bernadene Hayes as Judy
- Robert Gleckler as Jasper Cowdray
- Harvey Stephens as Barney Tait
- J. Carrol Naish as Pedro
- Matt Moore as Pilot
- Robert Livingston as Co-Pilot
