= One Hour to Live =

- Theatrical release poster
- Directed by: Harold D. Schuster
- Screenplay by: Roy Chanslor
- Produced by: George Yohalem
- Starring: Charles Bickford; Doris Nolan; John Litel; Samuel S. Hinds; Paul Guilfoyle; Robert Emmett Keane
- Cinematography: George Robinson
- Edited by: Edward Curtiss
- Production company: Universal Pictures
- Distributed by: Universal Pictures
- Release date: November 10, 1939
- Running time: 61 minutes
- Country: United States
- Language: English
- Budget: $81,000

One Hour to Live is a 1939 American crime film directed by Harold D. Schuster and written by Roy Chanslor. The film stars Charles Bickford, Doris Nolan, John Litel, Samuel S. Hinds, Paul Guilfoyle and Robert Emmett Keane. The film was released on November 10, 1939, by Universal Pictures.

== Cast ==
- Charles Bickford as Inspector Sid Brady
- Doris Nolan as Muriel Vance
- John Litel as Rudolph Spain
- Samuel S. Hinds as Commissioner Cromwell
- Paul Guilfoyle as Stanley Jones
- Robert Emmett Keane as Max Stanton
- John Gallaudet as Jimmy March
- Emory Parnell as Fats Monohan
- Jack Carr as Rikki Renoir / Tiger Renoir
