= Condemned Women =

1938 film by Lew Landers

- Theatrical release poster
- Directed by: Lew Landers
- Screenplay by: Lionel Houser
- Story by: Lionel Houser
- Produced by: Robert Sisk
- Starring: Sally Eilers; Louis Hayward; Anne Shirley; Esther Dale; Lee Patrick
- Cinematography: Nicholas Musuraca
- Edited by: Desmond Marquette
- Music by: Roy Webb
- Production company: RKO Pictures
- Distributed by: RKO Pictures
- Release date: March 18, 1938
- Running time: 77 minutes
- Country: United States
- Language: English

Condemned Women is a 1938 American drama film directed by Lew Landers and written by Lionel Houser. The film stars Sally Eilers, Louis Hayward, Anne Shirley, Esther Dale and Lee Patrick. The film was released on March 18, 1938.

== Plot ==
Linda Wilson does not care about life both outside and inside of jail, but that changes once she falls in love with the prison psychiatrist Dr. Phillip. All is good until she is asked to leave Phillip in order to not damage his career.

== Cast ==
- Sally Eilers as Linda Wilson
- Louis Hayward as Dr. Philip Duncan
- Anne Shirley as Millie Anson
- Esther Dale as Mrs. Clara Glover
- Lee Patrick as Anna 'Big Annie' Barry
- Leona Roberts as Kate Holt
- George Irving as Warden Edmund Miller
- Richard Bond as David
- Netta Packer as Sarah Norton
- Rita La Roy as Cora
- Florence Lake as Prisoner
