= Follies Girl =

1943 film by William Rowland

- Directed by: William Rowland
- Written by: Charles Robinson; Marcy Klauber; Pat C. Flick; Lew Hearn; Arthur L. Jarrett; Marcy Klauber; Stedman Coles
- Produced by: David Rowland; William Rowland; Irvin Shapp
- Starring: Wendy Barrie; Doris Nolan; Gordon Oliver
- Cinematography: George Webber
- Edited by: Samuel Datlowe; Jerome Schnur; C.E. Schwengeler
- Music by: Ernie Holst
- Production company: William Rowland Productions
- Distributed by: Producers Releasing Corporation
- Release date: June 26, 1943
- Running time: 72 minutes
- Country: United States
- Language: English

Follies Girl is a 1943 American musical comedy film directed by William Rowland and starring Wendy Barrie, Doris Nolan and Gordon Oliver. It was made by the poverty row studio Producers Releasing Corporation. Much of the film takes place in or around a burlesque house. It was the final film appearance of Barrie apart from a cameo role in It Should Happen to You.

== Cast ==
- Wendy Barrie as Anne Merriday
- Doris Nolan as Francine La Rue
- Gordon Oliver as Pvt. Jerry Hamlin
- Anne Barrett as Bunny
- Arthur Pierson as Sgt. Bill Perkins
- J.C. Nugent as J.B. Hamlin
- Cora Witherspoon as Mrs. J.B. Hamlin
- William Harrigan as Jimmy Dobson
- Jay Brennan as Andre Duval
- Lew Hearn as Lew
- Cliff Hall as Cliff
- Marion McGuire as Trixie
- Pat C. Flick as Patsy
- Anthony Blair as Somers
- Jerri Blanchard as Jerri
- Sergei Badamsky as Scarini
- G. Swayne Gordon as Doorman
- Ray Heatherton as Bandleader Ray Heatherton
- Johnny Long as Bandleader Johnny Long
- Bobby Byrne as Bandleader Bobby Byrne
- Ernie Holst as Bandleader Ernie Holst
- Charles Weidman as Charles Weidman-Speciality
- Fritzi Scheff as Fritzi Scheff
- Claire and Arene as Specialty Act
- Lazare and Castellanos as Specialty Act
- The Song Spinners as Singers
- The Heat Waves as Specialty Act
- Virginia Mayo as Chorine

== Bibliography ==
- Koszarski, Richard. Hollywood on the Hudson: Film and Television in New York from Griffith to Sarnoff. Rutgers University Press, 2008.
