= Roger Converse =

1930's actor and MGM contract player

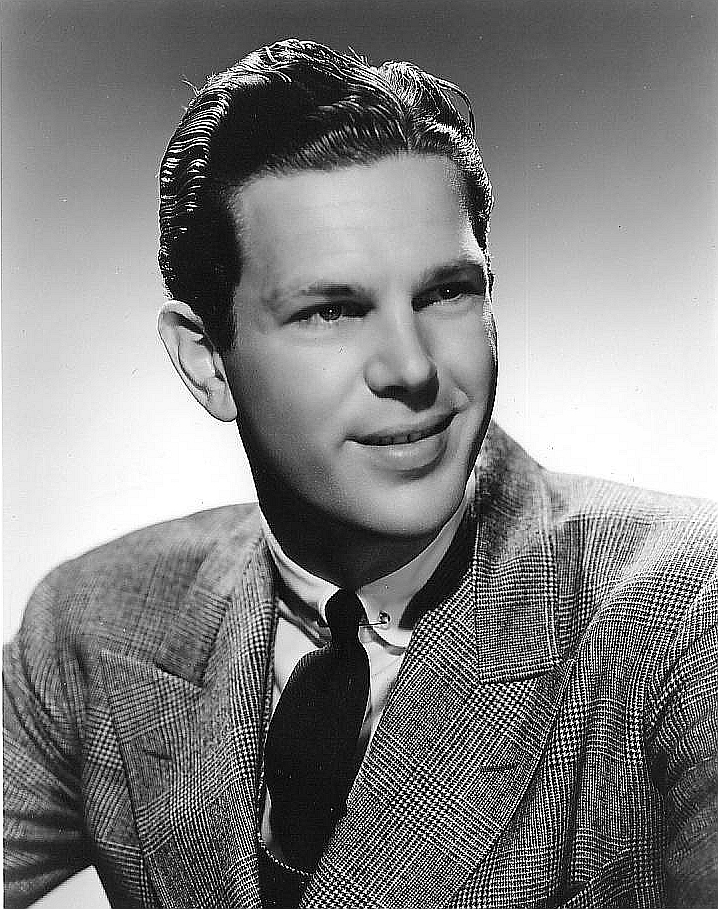
- Born: June 26, 1911; Santa Barbara, California
- Died: September 21, 1994 (aged 83); Los Angeles, California
- Occupation: Actor
- Years active: 1937–1939
- Spouse: Wilhelmina Schulte Converse (m. 1939–1994)
- Children: 1

Roger Converse (June 26, 1911 – September 21, 1994) was an American motion picture actor and MGM contract player of the late 1930s, who made a name for himself portraying gentlemen, boyfriends, and blue collar guys.

== Life and career ==
He was born on June 26, 1911, in Santa Barbara, California, and was educated at Hollywood High School where he was noted as being both an intellectual academic and a star athlete who graduated with several scholastic achievements in 1929. He had intended on furthering his education going onto medical school but following the Stock Market Crash of 1929, he choose to take other ventures and went straight into the workforce as a men's clothing model followed by a turn as a fitness instructor with the Los Angeles Athletic Club. In 1936, he was teaching an exercise class one day and was discovered by a talent scout who brought him to MGM Studios to be screen and wardrobe tested for motion pictures, the scout describing him, a blue-eyed, brown-haired man, who was 5 feet 8 inches in height, as appearing to be a "fine figure of masculinity with a nice round face". He began his career in 1937, in the motion picture The Bad Guy and went on to appear in 20 more films, some of which were My Dear Miss Aldrich (1937), The Shopworn Angel (1938), Snow Gets in Your Eyes (1938), Marie Antoinette (1938), and Calling Dr. Kildare (1939). He tested for the role of Rhett Butler for Gone with the Wind but was one of many men who lost out to Clark Gable.

He retired in 1939 to focus on marriage and fatherhood. He was financially secure from wise investments and was married to Wilhelmina Schulte from 1939 until his death in 1994. They had one son who predeceased the both of them in 1954. He spent the rest of his life living in Los Angeles, California, was supportive of the House Un-American Activities Committee hearings of the 1940s, even listing names of supposed communists as well, and he was active in Republican politics. He was also a diabetic and a devout Methodist who was active within his local church. He died from natural causes on September 21, 1994, and was interred at Forest Lawn Memorial Park, Glendale, Los Angeles, California.

== Filmography ==
Year	Title	Role	Notes
1937	Bad Guy	Detective	Uncredited
1937	My Dear Miss Aldrich	Ted Martin	
1937	Navy Blue and Gold	Size Inspector	Uncredited
1938	What Do You Think? (Number Three)	Fred	Short, Uncredited
1938	The First Hundred Years	Young Actor with Reggie	Uncredited
1938	Test Pilot	Advertising Man	Uncredited
1938	Snow Gets in Your Eyes	Tommy Bradford	Short
1938	Yellow Jack	Lieutenant	Uncredited
1938	Three Comrades	Becker's Assistant	Uncredited
1938	Woman Against Woman	Holland's Secretary	Uncredited
1938	Fast Company	Assistant Dist. Atty. Byers	Uncredited
1938	Marie Antoinette	Man in Gaming House	Uncredited
1938	The Shopworn Angel	Hotel Clerk	Uncredited
1938	The Chaser	Hotel Desk Clerk	Uncredited
1938	It's in the Stars	Mr. Jones	Short
1938	Boys Town	Lane - Newspaper Reporter	Uncredited
1938	Vacation from Love	Wedding Usher	Uncredited
1938	Young Dr. Kildare	Dr. Joiner	Uncredited
1938	The Shining Hour	Hotel Clerk	Uncredited
1938	Sweethearts	Usher	Uncredited
1939	Calling Dr. Kildare	Joiner	(final film role)
