= As Good as Married =

1937 film by Edward Buzzell

- Directed by: Edward Buzzell
- Written by: F. Hugh Herbert; Lynn Starling
- Story by: Norman Krasna
- Produced by: E.M. Asher
- Starring: John Boles; Doris Nolan; Walter Pidgeon
- Cinematography: Merritt B. Gerstad
- Edited by: Philip Cahn
- Music by: David Raksin; Frank Skinner
- Production company: Universal Pictures
- Distributed by: Universal Pictures
- Release date: May 21, 1937 (New York City)
- Running time: 73 minutes
- Country: United States
- Language: English

As Good as Married is a 1937 American comedy film directed by Edward Buzzell and starring John Boles, Doris Nolan and Walter Pidgeon. The film was produced and distributed by Universal Pictures. Filming started in December 1936.

== Plot ==
In order to avoid a large tax bill, a boss marries his secretary and ends up falling in love with her.

== Cast ==
- John Boles as Alexander Drew
- Doris Nolan as Sylvia Parker
- Walter Pidgeon as Fraser James
- Tala Birell as Princess Cherry Bouladoff
- Alan Mowbray as Wally
- Katharine Alexander as Alma Burnside
- Esther Ralston as Miss Danforth
- Ernest Cossart as Quinn
- Mary Philips as Laura
- Dorothea Kent as Poochie
- David Oliver as Ernie
- Harry Davenport as Jessup
- Billy Kent Schaefer as Page
- Elsa Christiansen as Jean Stafford
- Rita Gould as Saleslady

== Bibliography ==
- Fetrow, Alan G. Sound Films, 1927-1939: a United States Filmography. McFarland, 1992.
