= Moon Over Burma =

- Theatrical release poster
- Directed by: Louis King
- Screenplay by: Harry Clork; Wilson Collison; W. P. Lipscomb; Frank Wead
- Produced by: A.M. Botsford; Anthony Veiller
- Starring: Dorothy Lamour; Robert Preston; Preston Foster; Doris Nolan; Albert Bassermann; Frederick Worlock; Addison Richards
- Cinematography: William C. Mellor
- Edited by: Stuart Gilmore
- Music by: Victor Young
- Production company: Paramount Pictures
- Distributed by: Paramount Pictures
- Release date: December 11, 1940
- Running time: 76 minutes
- Country: United States
- Language: English

Moon Over Burma is a 1940 American adventure film directed by Louis King and written by Harry Clork, Wilson Collison, W.P. Lipscomb and Frank Wead. The film stars Dorothy Lamour, Robert Preston, Preston Foster, Doris Nolan, Albert Bassermann, Frederick Worlock and Addison Richards. The film was released on December 11, 1940, by Paramount Pictures.

== Plot ==
The managers of a teak lumber camp in Burma compete for the affections of a beautiful American entertainer who gets stranded in Rangoon.

== Cast ==
- Dorothy Lamour as Arla Dean
- Robert Preston as Chuck Lane
- Preston Foster as Bill Gordon
- Doris Nolan as Cynthia Harmon
- Albert Bassermann as Basil Renner
- Frederick Worlock as Stephen Harmon
- Addison Richards as Art Bryan
- Harry Allen as Sunshine
- Frank Lackteen as Khran
- Stanley Price as Khuda
- Henry Roquemore as Plantation Owner
- Rondo Hatton as Sailor (uncredited)
