= Navy Blue and Gold (film) =

1937 film by Sam Wood

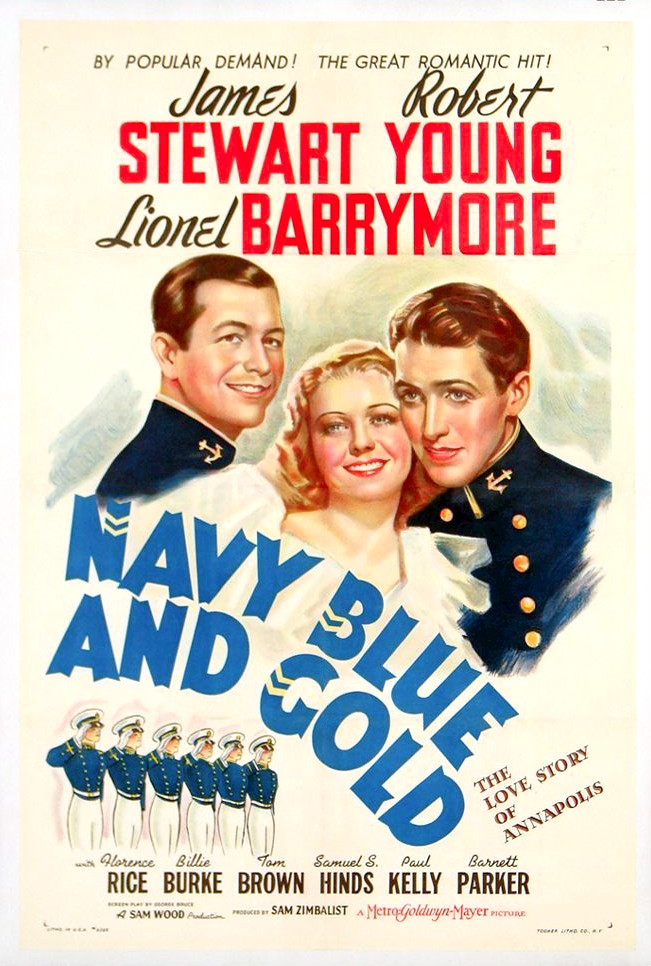
- 1937 Theatrical poster
- Directed by: Sam Wood
- Screenplay by: George Bruce
- Based on: Navy Blue and Gold; 1936 novel by George Bruce
- Produced by: Sam Zimbalist
- Starring: James Stewart; Robert Young; Lionel Barrymore; Florence Rice; Billie Burke; Tom Brown; Samuel S. Hinds; Paul Kelly; Barnett Parker
- Narrated by
- Cinematography: John F. Seitz
- Edited by: Robert Kern
- Music by: Edward Ward
- Distributed by: Metro-Goldwyn-Mayer
- Release date: November 19, 1937
- Running time: 94 minute
- Country: United States
- Language: English
- Budget: $458,000
- Box office: $1,168,000

Navy Blue and Gold is a 1937 American Metro-Goldwyn-Mayer dramatic film starring Robert Young, James Stewart and Lionel Barrymore. The plot revolves around the experiences of three young men attending the United States Naval Academy.

== Plot ==
After each is accepted for admission to the United States Naval Academy, three midshipmen, Dick Gates, Roger Ash and "Truck" Cross, become roommates. Dick is the scion of a wealthy family, Roger a former star football player for another university, and Truck a sailor appointed from the fleet. With a common love of football, all three go out for the plebe squad. Dick is tricked into committing a rules violation by a disreputable upperclassman with a penchant for hazing and is severely paddled. Even though hazing is forbidden by regulations, Roger decides to get even on his own terms. Despite his egotism, his classmates as well as the upperclassmen respect him when he challenges the abuser to a boxing match and wins it.

As upperclassmen, the roommates become varsity players. Dick is undersized but makes the team as a kicker, while Truck becomes a star center. Roger has come to Navy only for the publicity value of playing for the school and makes no effort during a game against a lesser opponent. When varsity coach Tommy Milton benches him for being a "slacker," he goes AWOL. Truck and Dick also go AWOL and find him drunk in a bar. Caught by Milton trying to get Roger back to barracks, the academy's former football coach, Captain "Skinny" Dawes, covers for them with an adroit adherence to the academy's honor system.

Truck faces dismissal from the academy for not using his true name upon enrollment, revealed when he defends the sullied reputation of his father, a disgraced navy ship's captain, (Note: Truck's father, Commander Carter, was dismissed from the US Navy under circumstances closely resembling those of the Honda Point disaster in 1923.) during a class discussion. Previously dismissive of academy traditions, Roger "prays" at the statue of Tamanend for Truck's exoneration, overheard by Captain Dawes. Truck is dismissed but reinstated when the superintendent grants him clemency based on Truck's dedication to the navy and his father, who has been restored to duty with his record cleared. Truck arrives at the stadium in time to help his roommates win the Army–Navy Game. (Note: Navy won the 1936 game with Army played before the film was made but lost the 1937 contest played shortly after production of the film wrapped.) At the traditional ceremony celebrating Navy's victory, Roger demonstrates his new-found devotion to the academy by giving up his place of honor to Captain Dawes.

== Cast ==
- Robert Young as Roger Ash
- James Stewart as "Truck" Cross
- Lionel Barrymore as Captain "Skinny" Dawes
- Florence Rice as Patricia Gates
- Billie Burke as Mrs. Gates
- Tom Brown as Richard Gates Jr.
- Samuel S. Hinds as Richard Gates Sr.
- Paul Kelly as Tommy Milton
- Barnett Parker as Graves
- Roger Converse as Size Inspector

== Production notes ==
Production Dates: 7 Sep—early Nov 1937. Portions of the picture were filmed at the Naval Academy in Annapolis, MD. The Los Angeles Memorial Coliseum was used as the Southern Institute stadium in the early portion of the film and later as the Naval Academy stadium.

== Reception ==
The film was very popular: according to MGM records it made $884,000 in the US and Canada and $284,000 in other countries, recording a profit of $297,000.

== See also ==
- Lionel Barrymore filmography
- List of American football films
