= The Man I Marry =

1936 film

- Directed by: Ralph Murphy
- Written by: Harry Clork; M. Coates Webster
- Produced by: Val Paul
- Starring: Doris Nolan; Michael Whalen; Charles "Chic" Sale; Nigel Bruce; Richard "Skeets" Gallagher; Marjorie Gateson; Cliff Edwards; Gerald Oliver Smith
- Cinematography: Joseph Valentine
- Edited by: Bernard W. Burton
- Production company: Universal Pictures
- Distributed by: Universal Pictures
- Release date: November 1, 1936
- Running time: 79 minutes
- Country: United States
- Language: English

The Man I Marry is a 1936 American drama film directed by Ralph Murphy and written by Harry Clork and M. Coates Webster. The film stars Doris Nolan, Michael Whalen, Charles "Chic" Sale, Nigel Bruce, Richard "Skeets" Gallagher, Marjorie Gateson, Cliff Edwards and Gerald Oliver Smith. The film was released on November 1, 1936, by Universal Pictures.

== Cast ==
- Doris Nolan as Rena Allen
- Michael Whalen as Ken Durkin
- Charles "Chic" Sale as Sheriff Clem Loudecker
- Nigel Bruce as Robert Hartley
- Richard "Skeets" Gallagher as Jack Gordon
- Marjorie Gateson as Eloise Hartley
- Cliff Edwards as Jerry Ridgeway
- Gerald Oliver Smith as Throckton Van Cortland
- Ferdinand Gottschalk as Organist
- Harry Barris as Piano Player
- Edward McWade as Druggist
- Harry Hayden as Minister
- Rollo Lloyd as Woody Ryan
- Peggy Shannon as Margot Potts
- Richard Carle as Storekeeper
- Lew Kelly as Counterman
