= Louis Hayward =

South African actor (1909–1985)

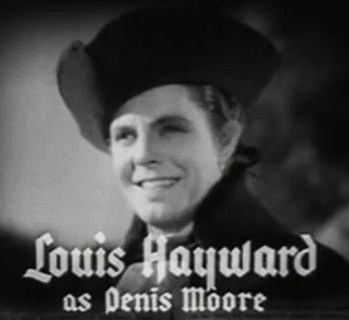
- Louis Hayward in Anthony Adverse (1936)
- Born: Louis Charles Hayward; 19 March 1909; Johannesburg, Transvaal Colony (now South Africa)
- Died: 21 February 1985 (aged 75); Palm Springs, California, U.S.
- Occupation: Actor
- Years active: 1930–1974
- Spouses: Ida Lupino (m. 1938; div. 1945) Peggy Morrow Field (m. 1946; div. 1950) June Hanson (m. 1953)
- Children: 1
- Awards: Bronze Star Medal

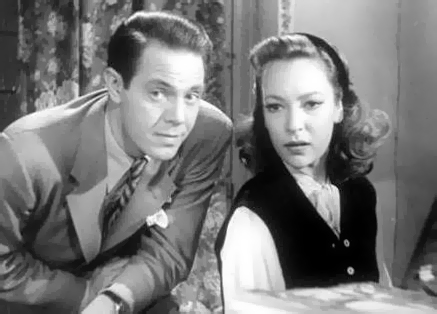
Louis Hayward and June Duprez in And Then There Were None (1945)

Louis Charles Hayward (19 March 1909 – 21 February 1985) was a South African actor.

== Early life, family and education ==
Louis Hayward was born in Johannesburg and raised in South Africa. However, he was educated in France and England, including Latymer Upper School in Hammersmith, London.

== Career ==
Hayward spent some time managing a nightclub but wanted to act and bought into a stock company.

=== England ===
He became a protégé of Noël Coward and began appearing in London in plays such as Dracula and Another Language. He was in the Gerald du Maurier stage play The Church Mouse.

Hayward started being cast in some British films of the early 1930s, such as Self Made Lady (1932) and The Man Outside (1933). He had the lead role in Chelsea Life (1933) and supporting parts in Sorrell and Son (1933), The Thirteenth Candle (1933) and I'll Stick to You (1933).

He appeared in a Coward musical, Conversation Piece (1934) and had the lead in The Love Test (1935), directed by Michael Powell.

=== Broadway and Hollywood ===
Hayward performed on Broadway in 1935 with a production of Coward's Point Valaine working with Alfred Lunt and Lynn Fontanne. The play, described as one of Coward's worst and poorly received critically and popularly, only ran for six weeks and was considered a failure, but Hayward won the Donaldson Award, a precursor to the Tony Awards

Consequently, he signed a four-picture contract with Metro-Goldwyn-Mayer. He started at MGM with a supporting role in The Flame Within (1935), written and directed by Edmund Goulding and starring Ann Harding. Hayward followed that film with A Feather in Her Hat for Columbia, billed after Basil Rathbone. Back at MGM he had supporting parts in Absolute Quiet (1935) and Trouble for Two (1936).

Hayward's career started to gain momentum when he was cast in the prologue of Warner Bros.' expensive blockbuster Anthony Adverse (1936), playing the father of the title character. His profile also was raised by marriage to Ida Lupino.

At Universal, he was the male lead in The Luckiest Girl in the World (1936) with Jane Wyatt, then he went to RKO to support Paul Muni and Miriam Hopkins in The Woman I Love (1937). Universal cast him in the lead of Midnight Intruder (1938), directed by Arthur Lubin. He also was the male lead in RKO's Condemned Women (1938).

Hayward was cast as the first screen incarnation of Simon Templar in Leslie Charteris' The Saint in New York (1938) at RKO. The film was a hit and would eventually lead to a long-running series. However, the next five films in the series starred George Sanders as Templar. Hayward would eventually reprise the role in The Saint's Return in 1953. He supported Danielle Darrieux and Douglas Fairbanks Jr. in The Rage of Paris (1938) at Universal.

In 1938, Hayward starred in The Duke of West Point (1938) for producer Edward Small, who signed him to make three films over the next five years, meaning he was unable to reprise his part as the Saint. However, Small started building Hayward into a star, casting him in a dual role in The Man in the Iron Mask (1939) under the direction of James Whale, co-starring with Joan Bennett. The film was a notable success.

Small put Hayward into My Son, My Son! (1940) with Madeleine Carroll and Brian Aherne. RKO borrowed him for Dance, Girl, Dance (1940) where he appeared with Maureen O'Hara and Lucille Ball. Small then put him in The Son of Monte Cristo (1940), another swashbuckler with Bennett and a sequel to the 1934 The Count of Monte Cristo.

Hayward was loaned to Columbia to co-star with his wife Ida Lupino in Ladies in Retirement (1941).

=== War service ===
In July 1942, during World War II, Hayward enlisted in the United States Marine Corps. He commanded a photographic unit that filmed the Battle of Tarawa in the documentary With the Marines at Tarawa—winner of the 1944 Academy Award for Best Documentary (Short Subject). Hayward was awarded the Bronze Star Medal and attained the rank of captain.

While off-duty in New Zealand, he "went under the name of 'Captain Richards' to avoid the rush of the ladies" as recalled by a waiter at the Green Parrot, a Wellington restaurant.

=== Return to Hollywood ===
Returning to Hollywood, he played Philip Lombard in the 1945 film version of And Then There Were None (1945) for René Clair.

For Hunt Stromberg, he co-starred with Jane Russell in Young Widow (1946) and supported Hedy Lamarr in The Strange Woman (1946). He returned to the swashbuckler genre for Edward Small with Monte Cristo's Revenge (1947).

Hayward made a thriller for Eagle Lion, Repeat Performance (1947), then did The Black Arrow Strikes (1948), another swashbuckler. Eagle Lion used him in Ruthless (1948) with Zachary Scott, then he did Walk a Crooked Mile (1948) for Small.

Hayward went to Italy to make The Masked Pirate (1949) for United Artists. After Fritz Lang cast him in the lead of House by the River (1950) for Republic Pictures, he did some adventure films for Columbia: Fortunes of Captain Blood (1950) and Dick Turpin's Ride (1951)--whose title for U.S. release was The Lady and the Bandit. For the latter studio, he also starred in The Son of Dr. Jekyll (1951).

Walter Wanger cast him in Lady in the Iron Mask (1951), then he did Captain Blood, Fugitive (1952), a sequel to Fortunes of Captain Blood.

=== Television ===
Hayward began appearing on TV in "Crossed and Double Crossed" for The Ford Television Theatre (1952). For Allied Artists, he starred in and helped produce Storm Over Africa (1953), then he reprised his role as Simon Templar in The Saint's Return (1954), shot in Britain. He starred in Men Behind Bars (1954) for Warner Bros.

Hayward starred in the 1954 syndicated television series The Lone Wolf, which ran for 39 episodes. He did episodes of Matinee Theatre ("Beginning Now"), Climax! ("A Promise to Murder"), TV Reader's Digest ("The Voyage of Captain Tom Jones, Pirate"), Lux Video Theatre ("So Evil My Love", "Suspicion"), The O Henry Playhouse ("Hearts and Hands"), Studio One in Hollywood ("Balance of Terror"), Schlitz Playhouse ("A Contest of Ladies"), The Highwayman, and Decision ("Stand and Deliver").

In films, he was in The Search for Bridey Murphy (1956). He guest starred on series such as Riverboat and was in a TV production of The Picture of Dorian Gray (1961) with George C. Scott.

Hayward's work onstage included Noël Coward's Conversation Piece and, in the early 1960s, the national tour of Camelot in which he appeared as King Arthur.

Hayward starred in the British television series The Pursuers (1961–62). His other television work includes the Alfred Hitchcock Hour ("Day of Reckoning"), Kraft Television Theatre ("Dead on Nine"), Rawhide, and Burke's Law.

=== Later career ===
Hayward's last films included Chuka (1967) and The Christmas Kid (1967). He had roles in Harold Robbins' The Survivors (1969), The Phynx (1970), Night Gallery (1971), The Last of the Powerseekers (1973) and Terror in the Wax Museum (1973). His last appearance was in an episode of The Magician, titled "The Illusion of the Lethal Playthings" (1974).

For his contributions to the motion picture and television industries, Hayward was honored in 1960 with two stars on the Hollywood Walk of Fame at 1500 and 1680 Vine Street, respectively.

== Personal life and demise ==
Hayward married actress/director Ida Lupino on 17 November 1938 in a quiet civil ceremony held in the historic courthouse in Santa Barbara, California. After he returned from the war, he was drastically different, which caused a strain in the marriage. They were divorced in 1945. He then met Peggy Morrow, and after dating for a while, they married on 29 May 1946. They divorced four years later on 13 March 1950.

He had one son, Dana, with his third wife, June Hanson.

Hayward publicly stated that his more than five-decade-long habit of smoking three packs of cigarettes daily was the likely cause of his cancer. He died on 21 February 1985 at the age of 75 in Palm Springs, California, from lung cancer.

== Selected filmography ==
- Self Made Lady (1932) – Paul Geneste
- Chelsea Life (1933) – David Fenner
- The Thirteenth Candle (1933) – Paul Marriott
- The Man Outside (1933) – Frank Elford
- Sorrell and Son (1933) – Duncan
- I'll Stick to You (1933) – Ronnie Matthews
- A Feather in Her Hat (1935) – Richard Orland
- The Love Test (1935) – John Gregg
- The Flame Within (1935) – Jack Kerry
- Absolute Quiet (1936) – Gregory Bengard
- Trouble for Two (1936) – Young Man With Cream Tarts
- Anthony Adverse (1936) – Denis Moore
- The Luckiest Girl in the World (1936) – Anthony McClellan
- The Woman I Love (1937) – Lt. Jean Herbillion
- Midnight Intruder (1938) – Barry Gilbert
- Condemned Women (1938) – Dr. Philip Duncan
- The Saint in New York (1938) – Simon Templar, aka The Saint
- The Rage of Paris (1938) – Bill Duncan
- The Duke of West Point (1938) – Steven Earley
- The Man in the Iron Mask (1939) – Louis XIV / Philippe of Gascony
- My Son, My Son! (1940) – Oliver Essex
- Dance, Girl, Dance (1940) – Jimmy Harris
- The Son of Monte Cristo (1940) – Edmund Dantes Jr.
- Ladies in Retirement (1941) – Albert Feather
- And Then There Were None (1945) – Philip Lombard
- Young Widow (1946) – Lt. Jim Cameron
- The Strange Woman (1946) – Ephraim Poster
- The Return of Monte Cristo (1946) –Edmond Dantes
- Repeat Performance (1947) – Barney Page
- The Black Arrow (1948) – Sir Richard Shelton
- Ruthless (1948) – Vic Lambdin
- Walk a Crooked Mile (1948) – Philip 'Scotty' Grayson
- The Pirates of Capri (1949) – Count Amalfi, alias Captain Sirocco
- House by the River (1950) – Stephen Byrne
- Fortunes of Captain Blood (1950) – Captain Peter Blood
- Dick Turpin's Ride (1951) – Dick Turpin
- The Son of Dr. Jekyll (1951) – Edward Jekyll / Dr. Henry Jekyll / Mr. Hyde
- Lady in the Iron Mask (1952) – D'Artagnan
- Captain Blood, Fugitive / Captain Pirate (1952) – Capt. Peter Blood
- The Royal African Rifles (1953) – Denham
- The Saint's Return (1953) – Simon Templar aka The Saint
- Duffy of San Quentin (1954) – Edward 'Romeo' Harper
- The Search for Bridey Murphy (1956) – Morey Bernstein
- The Alfred Hitchcock Hour (1962) (Season 1 Episode 10: "Day of Reckoning") - Judge David Wilcox
- Chuka (1967) – Major Benson
- The Christmas Kid (1967) – Mike Culligan
- The Phynx (1970) – Louis Hayward
- Terror in the Wax Museum (1973) – Tim Fowley

== Sources ==
- Wise, James E.; Anne Collier Rehill (1999). "LouisHayward". Stars in the Corps: Movie actors in the United States Marines (2nd ed.). Naval Institute Press. pp. 27–34. ISBN 978-1-55750-949-9.
