= Bad Guy (1937 film) =

1937 film by Edward L. Cahn

- Theatrical release poster
- Directed by: Edward L. Cahn
- Screenplay by: Earl Felton; Harry Ruskin
- Story by: J. Robert Bren; Kathleen Shepard; Hal Long
- Produced by: Tom Reed
- Starring: Bruce Cabot; Virginia Grey; Edward Norris; Jean Chatburn; Cliff Edwards
- Cinematography: Lester White
- Edited by: Ben Lewis
- Music by: Edward Ward
- Production company: Metro-Goldwyn-Mayer
- Distributed by: Loew's Inc.
- Release date: August 27, 1937
- Running time: 69 minutes
- Country: United States
- Language: English

Bad Guy is a 1937 American crime film directed by Edward L. Cahn and written by Earl Felton and Harry Ruskin. The film stars Bruce Cabot, Virginia Grey, Edward Norris, Jean Chatburn and Cliff Edwards. It was released on August 27, 1937 by Metro-Goldwyn-Mayer.

== Plot ==
Power linesman Lucky Walden kills the crooked gambler who had cheated him. He is convicted and sentenced to death.

Lucky's one chance is for his brother Steve to locate an eyewitness who can testify that Lucky killed the man in self-defense. When the man is found and corroborates the story, Lucky is awarded a stay of execution. He then earns a full parole by risking his life when saving a fellow inmate from some dangerous high-voltage wires.

Lucky returns to his old vices. He violates his parole and is returned to prison. Lucky coaxes Steve into helping him rig the prison's electrical bars to help him escape. Steve's girlfriend Kitty is also attracted to Lucky and wants him out of prison. The cops chase Lucky until he is electrocuted by the electrified wires. Steve is sentenced to jail.

== Cast ==
- Bruce Cabot as 'Lucky' Walden
- Virginia Grey as Kitty
- Edward Norris as Steve Carroll
- Jean Chatburn as Betty
- Cliff Edwards as 'Hi-Line'
- Charley Grapewin as Dan Gray
- Warren Hymer as 'Shorty'
- John Hamilton as Warden
- Clay Clement as Bronson
- Roger Converse as Detective
