= Chelsea Life =

1933 British film by Sidney Morgan

- Directed by: Sidney Morgan
- Written by: Joan Morgan
- Produced by: Sidney Morgan
- Starring: Louis Hayward; Molly Johnson; Anna Lee
- Cinematography: Henry Harris
- Production company: British & Dominions Film Corporation
- Distributed by: Paramount British Pictures
- Release date: November 1933
- Running time: 69 minutes
- Country: United Kingdom
- Language: English

Chelsea Life is a 1933 British drama film directed by Sidney Morgan and starring Louis Hayward, Molly Johnson and Anna Lee. It was written by Joan Morgan, and was shot at Elstree Studios as a quota quickie for release by the British subsidiary of Paramount Pictures.

== Preservation status ==
The British Film Institute National Archive holds a collection of ephemera and stills but no film or video materials.

== Plot ==
David Fenner is a struggling painter, In need of money, he signs his name to the work of Grillini, an Italian landscape artist. His cheating takes him to prominence and affluence, and he becomes engaged to Honourable Muriel Maxton. Lulu, a friend from his early days, is resentful, but still warns David when Grillini suddenly turns up. David is exposed, jilted by Muriel, and subsequently finds work on Brighton beach, painting sea scenes. Lulu is there to comfort him.

== Cast ==
- Louis Hayward as David Fenner
- Molly Johnson as Lulu
- Anna Lee as the Honourable Muriel Maxton
- Kathleen Saxon as Mrs. Bonnington
- Stanley Vilven as Signor Grillini
- Gordon McLeod as Lawton Hodge
- Eric Hales as Harry Gordon
- Patrick Ludlow as Lancelot Humphrey
- Arthur Chesney as Ambrose Lincoln

== Reception ==
The Daily Film Renter wrote: "Artificial story of young artist who rises to fame by putting his name to work of another. Chelsea atmosphere smacks strongly of conventional ideas of Bohemianism, but fails to achieve conviction. Action is continually held up by seemingly interminable bouts of dreary and superficial dialogue, while characterisation is stilted to a degree. Louis Hayward and unnamed actor who contributes minor cameo as Lancashire mayor are only players to stand out. For uncritical patrons."

Picturegoer wrote: "Quite an ingenious little story pleasantly directed in a fresh and original manner. The action is rather slow, but the characters are well drawn and, while the drama is not strong, the humour is unforced and natural."

Picture Show wrote: "There is little to recommend this romance of love among the artists. ... The atmosphere is overdone, the characters obvious and unconvincing, with the exception of that played by Louis Hayward with an ability that should lead to far better things."
