= Doris Nolan =

American actress (1916–1998)

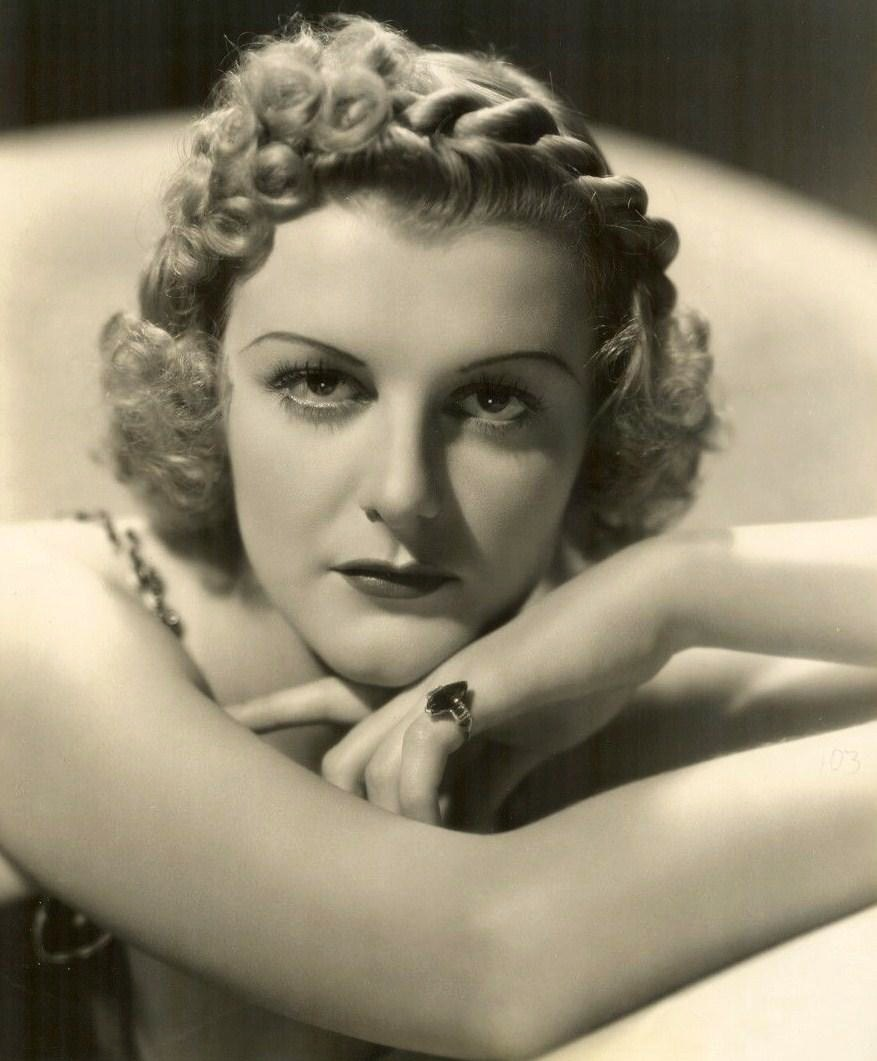
- Nolan in 1937
- Born: July 14, 1916; New Rochelle, New York, U.S.
- Died: July 29, 1998 (aged 82); Berwick-upon-Tweed, Northumberland, England
- Occupation: Actress
- Years active: 1936–1981
- Spouse: Alexander Knox (m. 1944; died 1995)
- Children: 1

Doris Murdock Nolan (July 14, 1916 – July 29, 1998) was an American actress best known for her Broadway roles and her appearance in the 1938 movie Holiday. She appeared in plays and films during the 1930s and 1940s. Later she moved to the UK, where she made guest appearances on British television shows.

== Early years ==
Nolan was born on July 14, 1916, in New Rochelle, New York. She was the daughter of Frank J. Nolan, a woolen goods importer, and Mary L. Fields. She began acting in high school in New Rochelle, New York. After graduation, she joined the Provincetown Players in 1933, working as the director's secretary to pay her tuition. The following summer, she joined the Clinton Hollow Theatre in Poughkeepsie, New York. Her acting as the female lead in The Late Christopher Bean there was seen by a talent scout, and that led to her getting a contract with Fox Studios.

== Career ==
Nolan's first professional acting contract was with Fox Film Corporation, when she was 16 years old. She was given a small role in Our Little Girl with Shirley Temple, but after she botched her scene several times, Fox dropped her from the movie and gave her no more work.

She then switched to Broadway, where she achieved greater success. Although she was just 17, Nolan was cast as the female lead in Night of January 16th, produced by her manager Al Woods. She was nervous about playing the part of an older femme fatale who was the mistress (and possibly murderer) of a rich businessman. Despite her jitters, the show was a success and Nolan got positive reviews.

When Nolan left the play, Woods sent her back to Hollywood, getting her a contract with Universal Pictures. She continued to move back and forth between movies and theater throughout the 1930s and 1940s. Her most prominent film appearance was in the 1938 version of Holiday, where she played alongside Katharine Hepburn and Cary Grant. Her subsequent film roles went downhill, but she reinvigorated her Broadway career with an 18-month stint in The Doughgirls, a popular comedy play about the difficulties of life during World War II. It was made into a film. Her final Broadway appearance was in The Closing Door, alongside her husband, who had written the play. It got poor reviews and closed after a few weeks.

After moving to the UK in the early 1950s, Nolan worked in regional stage productions and took guest parts on television series, such as The Saint, where she appeared in 1962 in "The Latin Touch", the second episode of the first season. Her final television appearance was in an episode of ITV's Brideshead Revisited serial in 1981.

== Personal life ==
Nolan married Canadian actor Alexander Knox in a civil ceremony on December 30, 1944. The judge presiding over the wedding almost mistakenly pronounced her married to Knox's best man, but they stopped him and redid the vows. They had a son, Andrew Joseph Knox, who became an actor and appeared in the sitcom Doctor on the Go. Andrew was briefly married to actress Imogen Hassall; he died by suicide in 1987. Alexander Knox's political activity caused him trouble during the Hollywood blacklist, and the couple moved to the UK so he could continue working. Nolan died on July 29, 1998, aged 82.

== Credits ==
=== Broadway ===
Year	Show	Role	Notes
1935	Night of January 16th	Karen Andre	Broadway debut
1936	Arrest that Woman	Marie Smith	
1937	Tell Me Pretty Maiden	Margo Dare	
1938	Lorelei	Karen Von Singall	
1940	Cue for Passion	Vivienne Ames	
1942	The Cat Screams	Gwen Reid	
1942	The Doughgirls	Nan	
1949	The Closing Door	Norma Trahern	

=== Film ===
Year	Film	Role	Notes
1936	The Man I Marry	Rena Allen	Film debut
1937	As Good as Married	Sylvia Parker	
1937	Top of the Town	Diana Borden	
1938	Holiday	Julia Seton	
1939	One Hour to Live	Muriel Vance	
1940	Moon Over Burma	Cynthia Harmon	
1940	Irene	Lillian	
1943	Follies Girl	Francine La Rue	
1966	Bindle (One of Them Days)	American tourist	
1974	Juggernaut	Mrs. Corrigan	
1975	The Romantic Englishwoman	2nd Mealticket Lady	

=== Television ===
Year	Show	Role	Notes
1951	Sunday Night Theatre	Mrs. Chisholm	
1954	Colonel March of Scotland Yard ("The Abominable Snowman")	Mary Gray	
1956	The Adventures of Aggie	Mrs. de Witt	
1956	The Adventures of Robin Hood	Prince John's Wife	
1956	Colonel March of Scotland Yard ("The Case of the Kidnapped Poodle")	Mrs. Linda Brewster	
1958	ITV Play of the Week ("The Myth Makers")	Mrs. Brawley	
1959	The Third Man	Miss Nolan	
1959	ITV Play of the Week ("The Last Hours")	Eleanor	
1959	ITV Play of the Week ("The Winner")	Irma Mahler	
1959	Armchair Theatre		
1962	The Saint	Maude Inverest	
1964	Emergency – Ward 10	Lydia Stock	5 episodes
1966	Play of the Month	Mrs. Markham	
1968	Boy Meets Girl	Mrs. Bloemendal	
1969	Strange Report	Miss Gray	
1981	Brideshead Revisited	Mrs. Stuyvesant-Oglander	
