= Sunbonnet Sue =

1945 film by Ralph Murphy

- Directed by: Ralph Murphy
- Written by: Richard A. Carroll; Ralph Murphy; Sidney Sutherland (prologue)
- Story by: Bradford Ropes; Paul Gerard Smith
- Produced by: Scott R. Dunlap
- Starring: Gale Storm; Phil Regan; George Cleveland
- Cinematography: Harry Neumann
- Edited by: Richard Currier
- Music by: Edward J. Kay
- Production company: Monogram Pictures
- Release date: October 6, 1945
- Running time: 89 minutes
- Country: United States
- Language: English

Sunbonnet Sue is a 1945 American comedy musical film directed by Ralph Murphy and starring Gale Storm, Phil Regan and George Cleveland. The film's composer, Edward J. Kay, was nominated for an Academy Award for Best Original Score in 1946.

== Cast ==
- Gale Storm as Sue Casey
- Phil Regan as Danny
- George Cleveland as Casey, Tavern Owner
- Minna Gombell as Mrs. Fitzgerald
- Edna Holland Julia (as Edna M. Holland)
- Raymond Hatton as Joe Feeney
- Charles D. Brown as Father Hurley
- Alan Mowbray as Jonathan
- Charles Judels as Milano
- Gerald Oliver Smith Masters (as Gerald O. Smith)
- William E. Green Flaherty (as Billy Green)
- Jerry Franks Jr. as Burke
- Michael Raffetto Commentator (voice)

== See also ==
- List of American films of 1945

== Bibliography ==
- Albagli, Fernando (1988). Tudo Sobre o Oscar. Rio de Janeiro: EBAL. ISBN 8527200155
- Filho, Rubens Ewald (2003). O Oscar e Eu. São Paulo: Companhia Editora Nacional. ISBN 8504006069
- Maltin, Leonard (2010). Classic Movie Guide second edition. Nova Iorque: Plume. ISBN 9780452295773
