= Top of the Town (film) =

1937 film

- Directed by: Ralph Murphy; Sam White; Walter Lang
- Written by: Robert Benchley; Lou Brock
- Produced by: Lou Brock; Charles R. Rogers
- Starring: Doris Nolan; George Murphy; Ella Logan
- Cinematography: Joseph A. Valentine
- Edited by: Maurice Wright
- Music by: Score: Frank Skinner; Songs: Jimmy McHugh (music); Harold Adamson (lyrics)
- Production company: Universal Pictures
- Distributed by: Universal Pictures
- Release date: April 18, 1937
- Running time: 86 minutes
- Country: United States
- Language: English
- Budget: over $1 million

Top of the Town is a 1937 American musical comedy film directed by Ralph Murphy, Sam White and Walter Lang and starring Doris Nolan, George Murphy and Ella Logan. It was produced and distributed by Universal Pictures.

== Cast ==
- Doris Nolan as Diana Borden
- George Murphy as Ted Lane
- Ella Logan as Dorine
- Hugh Herbert as Hubert
- Gerald Oliver Smith as Borden Executive
- Mischa Auer as Hamlet
- Gregory Ratoff as J.J. Stone
- Peggy Ryan as Peggy
- J. Scott Smart as Beaton (as Jack Smart)
- Ray Mayer as Roger
- Henry Armetta as Bacciagalluppi
- Gertrude Niesen as Gilda Norman
- Claude Gillingwater as William Borden
- Ernest Cossart as Augustus Borden
- Samuel S. Hinds as Henry Borden
- Richard Carle as Edwin Borden
- California Collegians as Singing Group
- The Four Esquires as Performers

== Reception ==
Writing for Night and Day in 1937, Graham Greene gave the film a poor review, describing it as "one of those distressingly carefree musicals [...] when the only ungay faces are among the audience".

The New York Times wrote, "Through some unaccountable oversight, Universal omitted the kitchen sink, but it tossed practically everything else it could find into its new musical colossus....Everything, that is, except a sense of humor, a semblance of continuity and the veriest morsel of credibility. They would have been handy things to have around. Without them the picture is just a big and dumb variety show with one fair turn following another up, and through, the gaudy finale and the super-supper room otherwise known as the Moonbeam Roof....It probably all is all right, as far as it goes, but it goes too far without getting anywhere. We found ourselves looking high and low for the kitchen sink; we wanted a drink of water."

The Chicago Tribune described the film as "just too much Christmas and also considerable of a draggy drawers. It has a lot of noise, a lot of so-so music, a good deal of pretty fair dancing, gobs of comedy that could be a heap funnier than it is, some new faces that remind you of other faces, and an itty bitty story that is practically lost sight of in the confusion. Doris Nolan, Universal's new girl find, is a pleasing and gracious young woman who makes you think of Gloria Stuart. Gertrude Niesen, recruited from the night clubs, sings several torch songs torchily, resembling now Mae West, now Nazimova and, in a couple of none too kind closeups—George Arliss. Ella Logan...is a bright note. And Peggy Ryan, a starlet, aged 10, imitates Eleanor Powell as well as any ten year old could be expected to do. George Murphy...is zippy and likable and Hugh Herbert and Gregory Ratoff are good for some—not many—laughs....This is an elaborate production. Somebody told me how much it cost, but there were too many figures. I can't remember them."
