= Vacation from Love =

1938 film by George Fitzmaurice

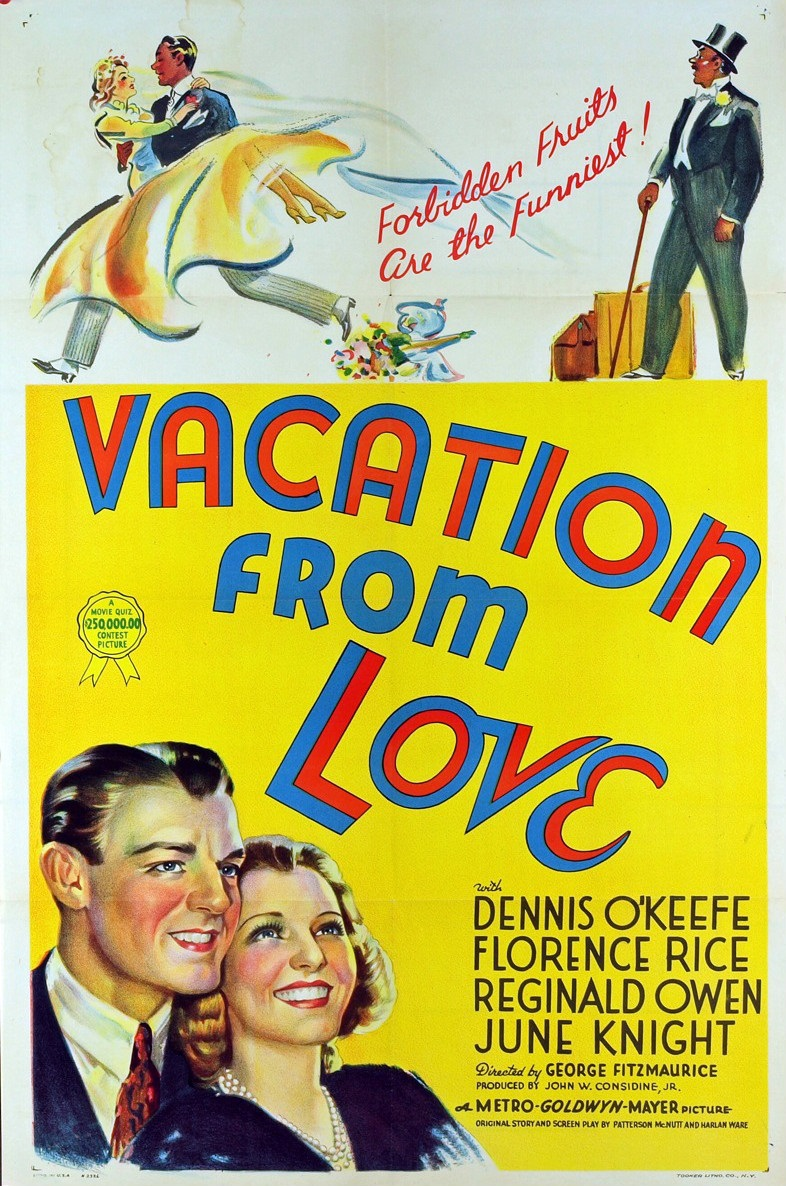
- Theatrical release poster
- Directed by: George Fitzmaurice
- Written by: Patterson McNutt; Harlan Ware
- Produced by: Orville O. Dull
- Starring: Dennis O'Keefe; Florence Rice; Reginald Owen; June Knight; Edward Brophy; Truman Bradley
- Cinematography: Ray June
- Edited by: Ben Lewis
- Music by: Chet Forrest; Edward Ward; Bob Wright
- Production company: Metro-Goldwyn-Mayer
- Distributed by: Loew's Inc.
- Release date: September 30, 1938
- Running time: 66 minutes
- Country: United States
- Language: English

Vacation from Love is a 1938 American comedy film directed by George Fitzmaurice, written by Patterson McNutt and Harlan Ware, and starring Dennis O'Keefe, Florence Rice, Reginald Owen, June Knight, Edward Brophy and Truman Bradley. It was released on September 30, 1938, by Metro-Goldwyn-Mayer.

== Plot ==
The plot follows Patricia Lawson who is about to marry T. Ames Piermont III. On the day of their civil ceremony, poor saxophone player Bill Blair objects to the marriage and Patricia decides to run off with him, leaving T. Ames at the altar.

== Cast ==
- Dennis O'Keefe as W.D. 'Bill' Blair
- Florence Rice as Patricia Lawson
- Reginald Owen as John Hodge Lawson
- June Knight as Flo Heath
- Edward Brophy as Barney Keenan
- Truman Bradley as Mark Shelby
- Tom Rutherford as T. Ames Piermont III
- Andrew Tombes as Judge Brandon
- Herman Bing as Oscar Wittlesbach
- George Zucco as Dr. Waxton
- Paul Porcasi as French Judge
- J. M. Kerrigan as Danny Dolan
- Armand Kaliz as M. Fumagolly
- Roger Converse as Wedding Usher
