= The Duke of West Point =

1938 film by Alfred E. Green

- Directed by: Alfred E. Green
- Written by: George Bruce
- Produced by: Edward Small
- Starring: Louis Hayward; Joan Fontaine; Tom Brown
- Cinematography: Robert H. Planck
- Edited by: Grant Whytock
- Music by: Frank Tours
- Production company: Edward Small Productions
- Distributed by: United Artists
- Release date: December 15, 1938 (New York City)
- Running time: 108 minutes
- Country: United States
- Language: English

The Duke of West Point is a 1938 American drama film directed by Alfred E. Green and starring Louis Hayward, Joan Fontaine and Tom Brown. It was described as "A Yank at Oxford in reverse".

== Plot ==
An American diplomat's son, Steven Early, having been educated in England, comes to West Point and enrolls, nicknamed "The Duke" by the others because of his background and bearing.

Steve becomes a scholar and athlete, excelling in ice hockey. His roommates and friends are cadets Sonny Drew and Jack West, and he develops a romantic interest in Ann Porter, angering another cadet who loves her.

When word reaches him that Jack's mother is having trouble with the business and needs help, Steve sneaks off campus after Taps to wire money to her, so that Jack will not have to give up West Point, making her promise not to tell who sent it but to tell Jack that all is well. Caught upon his return, Steve lies as to where he went so that his friend will not find out about the money. The lie is in violation of the Honor Code and results in him being shunned by all other cadets for the next year, given the silent treatment.

Before a big hockey game against a team of cadets from Canada, a serious accident befalls Sonny that leaves him unable to play, with possible permanent damage. Steve wears his friend's jersey and helps West Point win the game, but has made up his mind to submit his resignation as soon as the game ends. But then, the others learn from Jack's mother what Steve did for her and Jack, feeling very guilty, they all welcome him back among them. Steve then becomes engaged to Ann.

== Cast ==
- Louis Hayward as Steve
- Joan Fontaine as Ann
- Tom Brown as Sonny
- Richard Carlson as Jack
- Alan Curtis as Cadet Strong
- Don "Red" Barry as Cadet Grady (credited as Donald Barry)
- Steve Pendleton as Cadet Rains (credited as Gaylord Pendleton)
- Charles D. Brown as Doc Porter
- Jed Prouty as Mr. Drew
- Marjorie Gateson as Mrs. Drew
- Emma Dunn as Mrs. West
- George McKay as Varsity Hockey Coach
- James Flavin as Plebe Hockey Coach
- Nick Lukats as Plebe Football Coach
- Kenneth Harlan as Varsity Football Coach

== Production ==
This was the first movie Edward Small made back at United Artists after a stint at RKO.

The movie was originally meant to star ice skater Jack Dunn (the story climaxes with an ice hockey game) but the part had to be recast after he died in July 1938, just before production was about to commence. Louis Hayward, a friend of Dunn's, was given the lead instead. Edward Small subsequently signed Hayward to a multi-picture deal.

A number of former silent film stars had supporting roles.

The script had approval of West Point. Richard Carlson was borrowed from David O. Selznick and Joan Fontaine was borrowed from RKO. Filming started on September 22, 1938.

== Reception ==
Reviews were mixed.

== See also ==
- List of films about ice hockey
