= Dick Turpin's Ride =

1951 film by Ralph Murphy

- Directed by: Ralph Murphy
- Screenplay by: Robert Libott; Frank Burt
- Story by: Jack DeWitt; Duncan Renaldo
- Based on: Dick Turpin's Ride (poem) by Alfred Noyes
- Produced by: Harry Joe Brown
- Starring: Louis Hayward
- Cinematography: Henry Freulich; Harry Waxman
- Edited by: Gene Havlick
- Music by: George Duning
- Production company: Columbia Pictures
- Distributed by: Columbia Pictures
- Release date: August 13, 1951
- Running time: 79 minutes
- Country: United States
- Language: English

Dick Turpin's Ride (reissued as The Lady and the Bandit) is a 1951 American historical adventure film directed by Ralph Murphy and starring Louis Hayward. It follows the career of the 18th-century highwayman Dick Turpin and is based on the poem Dick Turpin's Ride by Alfred Noyes.

== Plot ==
Highwayman Dick Turpin rides 200 miles to save his wife from the gallows in 18th-century England.

== Cast ==
- Louis Hayward as Dick Turpin
- Patricia Medina as Joyce Greene
- Suzanne Dalbert as Cecile
- Tom Tully as Tom King
- John Williams as Archbald Puffin
- Malú Gatica as Baroness Margaret
- Alan Mowbray as Lord Charles Willoughby
- Lumsden Hare as Sir Robert Walpole
- Barbara Brown as Lady Greene
- Malcolm Keen as Sir Thomas de Veil
- Stapleton Kent as John Ratchett
- Sheldon Jett as Ramsey Jostin
- George Baxter as David Garrick
