= George Bruce (writer) =

American pulp-fiction writer and film/TV screenwriter (1898–1974)

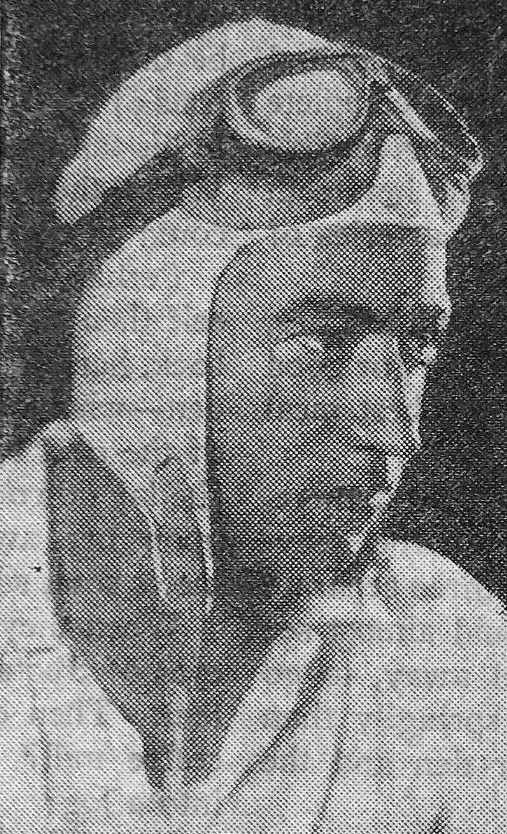
- Born: Daniel Fry Eyerly II; September 15, 1898; Danville, Pennsylvania
- Died: September 6, 1974 (aged 75); Riverside, California
- Occupations: Pulp-fiction author, screenwriter

George Bruce was the adopted name of a popular pulp-fiction writer of the late 1920s through the early '40s who specialized in World War I aviation stories. In 1937, he moved to Hollywood and penned screenplays for a number of popular films for Paramount, MGM, Columbia, and Edward Small Productions. In the 1950s and '60s, he wrote for a variety of television shows.

== Background ==
George Bruce (1898–1974) was born Daniel Fry Eyerly II, named after his grandfather. His parents were John Osborne Eyerly (1875–1955) and Annie Andrews Eyerly (1878–1982). Daniel Jr., his father, and grandfather were born in Danville, Pennsylvania. The elder sibling, Bruce had three brothers and a sister.

Daniel Fry Eyerly I (1850–1934), Bruce's grandfather, was employed as a boilermaker at the Montour Iron and Steel Company and the Reading Iron Works.

John Osborne Eyerly, followed a different path. He may have been influenced by his uncle John William Eyerly (1861–1917), a printer in the local newspaper business. J.O. Eyerly's first known professional job was at a local Danville newspaper, The Gem. When founder Richard W. Eggert retired in 1902, his employee J.O. bought and ran the paper.

By 1904, The Gem had folded and J.O. was living in Scranton, working for the Harrisburg Patriot. By 1906, he had taken a job with the Butterick Publishing Company, Manhattan. In early 1906, he was transferred to their Philadelphia offices to handle advertising. The family would permanently reside in Philly.

In 1911, J.O. worked for the Philadelphia Item. In 1912, he was in the advertising department of the Philadelphia Bulletin. In 1918, he was superintendent of Allen, Lane & Scott, a Philadelphia mercantile printer.

Daniel F. Eyerly II quit public school in 1911, after only seven years of education. In 1915, he seemed to follow in his father’s footsteps when he became business manager of the Boy Scout News, the official publication for the Philadelphia Boy Scouts, which had a circulation over 4,000. He was 16 years old.

== World War I ==
On April 25, 1916, now 17, Daniel F. Eyerly enlisted in the U.S. Army. In the Army, he contracted tuberculosis “in the line of duty” and was sent to the “tuberculosis hospital” at Fort Bayard, New Mexico. On September 11, 1917, he was “honorably discharged on a Surgeon’s Certificate of Disability”.

In 1918, Eyerly was recorded as an associate editor for the Chilton Company, a Philadelphia firm that published automobile trade magazines.

Eyerly left home when he was 21. His first known published work appeared in this period, a short story in the March 1920 Blue Book Magazine. The author was “George Bruce”. It's Eyerly's first known use of this name, suggesting that it was intended as a penname. Going forward, he used the name George Alden Bruce, both as real name and penname, as late as 1928.

== Crime and incarceration ==
In Philadelphia, Bruce worked for the paper company Attell & Jones, where he met William Arnold Reick (1899–1969), Henry Winfield Bourne (1900–1978), and Leona Lillian O’Toole (1901–1937). Bruce and O’Toole “soon fell in love”. After the employment fell through, the group lived in a boarding house. On Saturday, October 16, 1920, all were kicked out, so Bruce registered them in two rooms in the Hotel Stenton, Philadelphia, claiming to be a theatrical group. On Sunday, they were joined by O’Toole’s friend Elizabeth “Betty” Malloy (1900–). Bruce, the “master mind” of the group, cooked up a plan whereby, with no money, they could go to Miami and from there visit Cuba.

On Monday, Reick and Malloy took the train to Coatesville, 39 miles west of Philly, where Reick was to try and get money from a friend. Meanwhile, Bruce phoned the American Taxicab Company for a limousine. Driver Harry A. Ward showed up at the Hotel Stenton in a 7-passenger Cadillac touring car. Bruce told Ward that he, Bourne, and O’Toole had to reach Coatesville in a hurry because O’Toole’s mother was dying in the hospital there. They sneaked out of the Stenton without paying.

Ward drove the trio to Coatesville’s Hotel Grand, where Reick and Malloy were waiting in the lobby. The five then told Ward that they were mistaken about the hospital, that it was actually in Philadelphia. On the drive back, near Frazer, Bruce, in the passenger seat, pointed a pistol at Ward and ordered him to pull over. Then, someone in the back clubbed him with a blackjack. He was thrown unconscious onto the side of the road. When he recovered sufficiently, he crawled to the nearest house. The resident called Philly police, who took Ward to Chester County Hospital. He was released the next day. But Bruce’s group had come perilously close to murder.

Near Philadelphia, the hood of the limo flew off. They turned southward, kept off the main highways, and “traveled mountainous roads in Virginia seldom traversed by motor vehicles.” They reached Berryville, Virginia on Wednesday morning, stopping for repairs. Bruce reported that they’d been assaulted outside Harpers Ferry, West Virginia, held up at gunpoint.

At 1 a.m., October 23, the group checked into the March Hotel, Lexington, North Carolina, claiming they had been robbed. The limo was still missing its hood. Using varying names, and claiming to be “manufacturers of phonograph records”, they tried and failed to raise money around town. On Saturday afternoon, while pretending to repair the limo, they all piled in and sped away without paying the hotel.

Back in Philadelphia, the police monitored incoming telegrams. They got their break when O’Toole, betraying her location, wired a friend for funds.

The band of five arrived in Dublin, Georgia with the limo in bad shape. As they attempted to park on the street downtown, the brakes failed and the limo crashed into the plate-glass window of a jewelry shop. They told the Dublin police that they were in the song-publishing business. As the police held them, while attempting to resolve the financial issue with the jeweler, the heads-up message arrived from the Philly police. The five were held pending extradition.

Detective Mullen, two policemen, and limo driver Harry Ward took the train to Dublin. The five culprits, waiving extradition, were taken by train back to Philly. Ward identified his assailants, had the limo repaired in town, then drove back.

On December 20, 1920, all five pleaded guilty to larceny. The three men were sentenced to 5–10 years at hard labor and solitary confinement in the Eastern Penitentiary, Philadelphia. The two women were sent to the brand-new State Industrial School for Girls at Muncy.

In 1923, Bruce applied for a pardon to Governor Gifford Pinchot. The former resident physician, citing Bruce’s service in the Medical Department, “found him to be reliable in every way, strictly honest, unhesitatingly truthful, a willing worker and an intelligent assistant. . . . he has served the State faithfully and well.” The pardon was granted.

== Gates Flying Circus ==
In May 1924, Bruce surfaced in New Orleans with his wife, assumed to be Gertude Sheehan Bruce (1898–1984). He was a reporter for the New Orleans Item. He also joined an amateur theatrical group, the Lotus Players, who were rehearsing the drama Within the Law.

Another arrival to New Orleans in this period was the Gates Flying Circus, the nation’s top aerial entertainers, founded by Ivan R. Gates, and featuring daredevil pilot Clyde Pangborn. They traveled from city to city putting on air shows with displays of wing walking, parachuting, upside-down flying, jumping from plane to plane, and other daredevil deeds, often in conjunction with state fairs or other expositions. They routinely drew spectators in the thousands, sometimes tens of thousands. After a run through Texas and Louisiana, they arrived in New Orleans in early May. The Item sponsored a number of events with the circus: commissioning aerial photos of a mass hanging at the town of Amite on May 9; arranging a free 10-day air circus (May 28–June 8) in addition to the commercial events; and awarding readers with free flights, ultimately taking 2,000 airborne. Bruce, then, had ample opportunity to become acquainted with the circus.

The circus’s activities were always preceded by extensive publicity. By May 21, Bruce was acting as an advance man. He visited Monroe, Louisiana to finalize arrangements for Gates performances.

Typically, the circus performed for a single day, or as long as a week. In New Orleans, however, the aggressive sponsorship of the Item added continual reasons for them to stay. When they finally departed New Orleans in July 1924, Bruce left with them. For the next few years, he would be advance man and publicist for the circus. His service wasn’t continual. For example, in September 1926, a dormant period for the circus, Bruce, complaining of “rundown health”, returned to Danville to stay with his aunt and uncle for the winter.

By late October, he was back with the circus.

The dangerous and largely unregulated state of civil aviation, glaringly illustrated by mishaps in the air shows, led Congress to establish the Air Commerce Act, which created an Aeronautic Branch under the Department of Commerce to regulate pilots and aircraft. It became law on May 20, 1926, effectively neutering stunt flying. Years later, Bruce commented, “After the war I was with the Gates Flying Circus until the Department of Commerce frowned on such flying”.

== Pulp writer ==
Bruce’s destiny was altered by aviation history a second time when Charles Lindbergh made his solo flight from New York to Paris, landing on May 21, 1927, to great acclaim. On June 13, he received a ticker-tape parade in Manhattan, which happened to be the de facto capital of pulp-magazine publishing. The editors at Fiction House paid heed. With a July 1927 newsstand date, and an August cover date, their all-aviation-fiction magazine, Air Stories, the first of its kind, appeared on the market. It soon attracted competitors. By the end of 1928, there were eight such magazines on the newsstands; by the end of 1929, the number had risen to fifteen.

Jumping on the bandwagon, Bruce appeared in the fifth issue of Air Stories (December 1927) with a short story, “Flying Circus”, based on his Gates experience. The author’s credit was simply George Bruce. From that point forward, for the rest of his life, it was the name he was known by.

Bruce was an “overnight sensation.” Fiction House, his main publisher from 1927–32, bought virtually all of his prodigious output. He appeared in the inaugural issues of their other air pulps, Wings (January 1928) and Aces (December 1928), as well as their boxing fiction magazine, Fight Stories (June 1928). But, as recounted for a newspaper profile in 1932, “Aviation stories are his specialty; for them he got his background as a member of Gates’ Flying Circus”. Ultimately, aviation fiction accounted for 76% of his output. Much of it involved Western Front aerial combat drama, the thrust of the air pulps, but domestically-based stories about civil aviation or more modern military aviation themes, played a role. His most active period as a pulp writer were the ten years from 1928–37, when he averaged 38 appearances a year, most of them at novelette length. Ultimately, he appeared over 400 times in the pulps.

At his peak, Bruce was so popular that Fiction House published single-issue magazines with his name in the title and reprints of his stories, for example, George Bruce’s Air Novels (1931). When editorial executive John B. Kelly died in 1932, Bruce stopped sending the company material.

When Sky Fighters, a new pulp from independent publisher William L. Mayer (1906–33) came on the newsstands (July 1932), Bruce headlined every issue. When Mayer died on March 17, 1933, Bruce took over as president and editor, but backed out after a month.

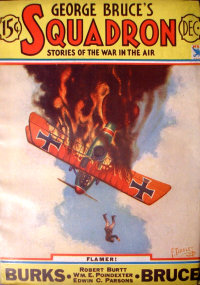
December 1933

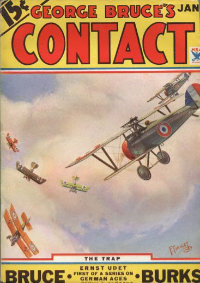
January 1934

Instead, he launched his own publishing company, Adventure House, with two new magazines, George Bruce’s Contact and George Bruce’s Squadron, both with August 1933 dates. He headlined every issue and continued the column, before abandoning the venture a year later. Needing a new home, he began selling his stories to the Thrilling pulp chain, which had bought and continued Sky Fighters; he also appeared in their other air title The Lone Eagle (taking Lindbergh’s nickname). Thrilling gave Bruce the opportunity to branch out into detective mysteries in their Popular Detective; a dozen of these stories featured hardboiled detective Red Lacey.

In 1935, he revisited the fictionalization of Gates. Like the 1927 short story, it was titled Flying Circus; unlike the short story, it was a serialization of the entire history of the Gates Flying Circus, beginning in San Francisco in 1919. Like the short, he called it the Ace Flying Circus, but unlike the short none of the character names resemble their real-life counterparts.

In 1937, with a Hollywood career having begun, he jumped ship to a reorganized Fiction House, whom he wrote for exclusively through 1942, but averaged a mere six appearances a year. This concluded his pulp-writing career.

== National organizations ==
=== American Fiction Guild ===
In 1931, with the Depression hurting the pulp-magazine market, and by extension the contributing authors, Bruce suggested to a group of writers at a party that writers needed to organize to protect their rights, word rates, and opportunities. At the initial meeting of the American Fiction Guild (AFG) held in Manhattan’s Hotel Somerset, late 1931, Bruce assumed the presidency. Bruce’s friend and fellow Fiction House air-story author, Arthur J. Burks, became vice-president.

The AFG was a national organization with local chapters, open to authors, illustrators, editors, agents, and publishers. Though the remit was broad, it became a de facto union for pulp writers. When the first elections were held in October 1932, Bruce bowed out of contention and Burks was voted president.

=== National Air Reserve ===
Bruce used many of his columns in George Bruce’s Contact and George Bruce’s Squadron to promote the National Air Reserve (NAR), his new organization intended to promote, for national defense purposes, pilot training. The origin date of the NAR, then, corresponds with the first appearance of the magazines on newsstands, July 1933.

Bruce was stunned at how fast the organization took off: “we never imagined any response to be as immediate and eager as has been evidence during the three weeks since the organization of the Reserve”. With the burden of running Adventure House and the NAR—and writing air stories—Bruce’s workday went from 8:30 a.m. to midnight. He hired an experienced magazine editor whose work consisted of “selecting and editing stories of battles above the clouds, and checking on the technic of aspects of aircraft and guns”. After a year, the NAR was active in many U.S. cities. For example, in March 1934, the Monroe, Louisiana unit reported a membership of 655. There was even a branch in the Philippines.

The NAR was loosely modeled after the AFG, structured as a national organization based in New York City with self-governing local chapters around the country. The NAR headquarters and Adventure House shared the same address (80 Lafayette Street). As with the AFG, which was active simultaneously, Bruce had Arthur J. Burks as a partner; Burks was appointed “National Chief-of-Staff, with rank of Major”. According to Burks, the NAR

wasn’t a circulation teaser like most departments. George actually enrolled people in his outfit and, more than that, called meetings of his members. I attended some of those meetings . . . Members of the National Air Reserve were general officers in the army, reserve officers, lawyers, senators, congressmen, doctors.

Bruce’s top goal was to obtain federal government backing to the pilot training mission by contributing officers, trainers, mechanics, etc. From approximately 1935 through early ’37, Bruce divided his time between New York and Washington, D.C. With the sponsorship of South Carolina representative, and WWI veteran, John J. McSwain (1875–1936), Bruce pushed a bill to establish a Junior Air Corps Reserve, which ultimately failed to get through Congress.

The NAR faded away for multiple potential reasons: the failure of the bill; the death of McSwain on August 6, 1936; lack of resources for the ambitious mission; the lessening of necessity for the NAR by developments in aviation, or differences in legislative priorities; Bruce’s loss of a forum when Adventure House folded in 1934; or his transition from pulp writer to screenwriter.

== Hollywood ==
=== Film ===
In late 1933, independent producer Ken Goldsmith (1899–1943) purchased Bruce’s novelette “Born to Hang” (George Bruce’s Contact, December 1933) to develop it for the screen. Bruce planned to leave for Hollywood, but the production came to nothing. Nevertheless, it demonstrated Bruce’s desire to move into film.

In November 1936, Bruce’s first novel Navy Blue and Gold was published, a saga of three football players at the U.S. Naval Academy, Annapolis, Maryland, one of whom was named Gates. By January, it was sitting on a bestseller list alongside Gone with the Wind. By March, MGM had purchased film rights. Early evidence of Bruce’s presence in Southern California was his March 16 interview on a Long Beach radio show, Literature on Parade.

Bruce was hired to write the Navy Blue and Gold screenplay. Meanwhile, independent producer B. P. Schulberg teamed Bruce with Paramount staff writer Frank Partos to adapt a James Edward Grant story. She's No Lady, a minor comedy of jewel thieves, starring Ann Dvorak, hit theaters on August 12, a few days after Bruce bought a North Hollywood estate at the foot of the hills. Navy Blue and Gold opened in November, starring James Stewart and Robert Young. The film turned a profit of $297,000. Bruce’s career transition was set.

He quickly followed up with the screenplay, from his story, for the MGM boxing drama The Crowd Roars, starring Robert Taylor. Released on August 5, 1938, it was a bigger hit than Navy Blue and Gold with a profit of $761,000.

About April 1938, on loan from MGM, Bruce began writing for independent producer Edward Small, who would provide his most productive market. Bruce wrote at least 17 screenplays for Small from 1938–52 (two went unfilmed). The first was The Duke of West Point (released December 15, 1938), and this time the sport was ice hockey. To prepare, Bruce spent a week at West Point.

After penning nine films for Edward Small productions (1938–42), Bruce returned to MGM to write films for some of the studio’s biggest stars (1942–47). They included Stand by for Action (1942; Robert Taylor, Charles Laughton); Keep Your Powder Dry (1945; Lana Turner); Fiesta (1947; Esther Williams); and Killer McCoy (1947; Mickey Rooney).

One MGM film in this period, Salute to the Marines (1943; Wallace Beery), closely followed the military career of old friend Arthur J. Burks. Beery’s character, Sergeant Major Bailey, is a trainer who’s frustrated he’s never won any battle ribbons, as Burks had been a frustrated trainer. Bailey retires to civilian life, as Burks did when he became a full-time pulp writer. Pearl Harbor leads Bailey to rejoin the service, as it did for Burks. “Bailey engages in combat, with heroic but fatal consequences”; Burks’s destiny was more prosaic, as he remained a trainer, albeit at a higher rank.

In 1948, Bruce returned to writing scripts for Edward Small. Five were produced through 1952, after which he made a clear break by moving into television. Notwithstanding the break, Bruce was involved with several other commercial films from 1958–62. In his film career, about 30 of his screenplays were produced.

=== Television ===
Bruce’s career as a television writer spanned from 1954–61. He wrote episodes for a number of shows for the three main networks, ABC, CBS, and NBC, as well as for syndication.

His first known episode was “The Long Trail”, starring Anthony Quinn, for the anthology series Schlitz Playhouse. He wrote eight episodes for the series (1954–55), two for Playhouse 90 (1956–57), eleven for Crossroads (1956–57), seven for The Lawless Years (1959–61), and a number of other random episodes and TV movies.

== Personal life ==
In the 1940s and early ’50s, Bruce was involved in three relationships that kept him in the public eye.

=== Violet Popovics ===
On January 26, 1940, Louella Parsons reported that Bruce had been divorced a few days earlier. On January 27, he “eloped” to Phoenix with aspiring Hungarian actress Violet Popovics (1906–97) whose stage name was Mitzi Mackar. Gertrude Bruce and son Thunder lived in Long Beach.

After two trial separations, Violet Bruce filed for divorce on April 28, 1943. The “decree was granted on the grounds of cruelty after Mrs. Bruce testified that her husband was sullen and moody and disapproved of her friends.”

=== Erna Rubinstein ===
In approximately November 1943, Bruce began a romance with Hungarian concert violinist Erna Rubinstein (~1907–), who he’d met at a private recital. She had debuted in the U.S. as a teenage prodigy in 1922, soloing for the New York Philharmonic at Carnegie Hall.

The couple married on June 11, 1944, in Bruce’s home, with Wallace Beery serving as best man.

By January 1945, the couple was separated and Rubinstein filed for divorce, testifying that she gave up her career for him. Two weeks later, they withdrew the suit. On July 29, Rubinstein walked into a Beverly Hills police station and reported that Bruce had struck her several times, loosening three teeth. Bruce was held, released on bail, arraigned, and a trial date was set. The divorce suit was refiled, wherein Rubinstein claimed that Bruce twisted her hand so badly she couldn’t play the violin. Thus, the relationship was acrimoniously litigated in two separate courts. Bruce was acquitted in the assault trial when the Bruces’ household help testified that, at the time of the alleged assault, Rubinstein had gone upstairs with a “$25 make-up box” (a gift from Bruce) and emerged with “streaky and awry” make-up which was then presented to the police as bruising; at a juror’s request she was asked to apply the make-up in court with the effect reproduced. In the divorce trial the following March, after a bevy of allegations from both sides, the judge denied Rubinstein alimony or community property, declaring that “the crowning piece of merciless cruelty was when she disgraced him publicly by having him arrested as a man who beats his wife.”

=== Luz Grant ===
In 1947, Bruce began a relationship with Luz Estefania Grant (1906–95), the recently widowed wife of wealthy hotel owner Alexander Grant (1902–47). A native of Lima, Peru, she had a son, 20, and a daughter, 16. In May 1948, Bruce moved into the guest house on her Encino ranch. On October 8, they married in Tijuana, although Bruce’s divorce from Erna Rubinstein wasn’t complete. Six months later, Grant loaned Bruce $1,000 to help wind up the divorce. On October 7, 1950, Bruce had the Mexican marriage annulled in order to clear the way for a legal marriage. When Bruce’s divorce from Rubinstein became final, Grant changed her mind about getting married, and Bruce sued her for the return of approximately $31,000 worth of gifts. On September 29, 1951, two days before the trial began, Grant told police that her Los Angeles apartment had been burgled of two pieces of jewelry valued at $11,000, items that Bruce was suing to regain. After the trial was over, Gertrude Bruce sued her ex-husband for three years of unpaid alimony. In the Bruce-Grant case, the judge rendered a split decision.

=== Additional ===
George Bruce lived in Palm Springs, California from the mid-1950s until his death in 1974 at age 75.

== Miscellaneous ==
- Despite his background, Bruce never had an aviation film produced. He had a close call with uncredited contributions to the script of A Yank in the R.A.F. (Fox, 1941).
- In her November 27, 1946, column, Louella Parsons reported that Jack Warner, head of Warner Brothers, had purchased an original story, The Persian Cat, for married stars Humphrey Bogart and Lauren Bacall. A year later, it was reported that Bruce was writing the screenplay. The film was never made.

== Selected broadcast history ==
=== Radio ===
- George Bruce’s Air Stories of the World War was a syndicated radio show that (based on surviving information) ran throughout 1932.

=== Film ===
- She’s No Lady (1937)
- Navy Blue and Gold (1937)
- The Crowd Roars (1938)
- The Duke of West Point (1938)
- The Man in the Iron Mask (1939)
- Miss Annie Rooney (1942)
- Two Years Before the Mast (1946)
- Walk a Crooked Mile (1948)
- Rogues of Sherwood Forest (1950)
- Valentino (1951)
- Kansas City Confidential (1952)
- Fury in Paradise (1955)
- Ride a Crooked Trail (1958)
- Solomon and Sheba (1959)
- Beauty and the Beast (1962)

=== Television ===
- Cameo Theatre (1955), “The Whisper of a Witness”
- Climax! (1956), “The Sound of Silence”
- Crossroads (1957), “In God We Trust”
- The Detectives (1961), “Quiet Night”
- The DuPont Show with June Allyson (1960), “I Hit and Ran”
- Ford Television Theatre (1956), “Front Page Father”
- Johnny Midnight (1956), “Somebody Loves You”
- Men of Annapolis (1957), “Crucial Moment”
- The Pepsi-Cola Playhouse (1955), “Passage Home”
- Playhouse 90 (1957), “Snowshoes: A Comedy of People and Horses”
- Tightrope! (1960), “Big Business”
- TV Reader's Digest (1955), “The Brainwashing of John Hayes”

== Selected fiction ==
=== Magazines ===
- “Jerry the Crouch”, Blue Book Magazine, March 1920 (first known published work)
- “Flying Circus”, Air Stories, December 1927 (first aviation story)
- “Fangs of the Gray Wolf”, Over the Top, October 1928
- The Lost Legion, Air Stories, October 1928–March 1929 (first serial)
- “Wings Against the Moon”, Airplane Stories, May 1929
- “The Ace Without a Country”, George Bruce’s Aces, March 1931
- “Zeppelin”, Action Stories, September 1931
- “Satan’s Torch”, George Bruce’s Sky Fighters, 1932
- “The Fall Guy”, Black Aces, January 1932
- Flying Circus, Argosy, Nov. 30, 1935–Jan. 4, 1936 (6-part serial)
- “They Died in Vain”, Sky Fighters, January 1937
- “Three Men—and a Boat!”, Liberty, July 10, 1937
- “Vickers Over Verdun”, Aces, Spring 1938
- “The Judas Jackpot”, Bull's-Eye Detective, Fall 1938
- “The Tarnished Ace of the Silver Circus”, Wings, Winter 1939
- “Solo Showdown”, Wings, Fall 1942 (last pulp story)

=== Books ===
- Navy Blue and Gold (NY: William Caslon Company, 1936; NY: Grosset & Dunlap, 1937)
- Too Tough to Die (Caslon, 1936)
- Claim of the Fleshless Corpse (NY: Dodge Publishing Company, 1937)

== Resources ==
- Frank Gruber, The Pulp Jungle (Los Angeles, CA: Sherbourne Press, 1967)
- Carl M. Cleveland, “Upside-Down” Pangborn: King of the Barnstormers (Glendale, CA: Aviation Book Company, 1978)
- Will Murray, "George Bruce, the Flying Fabulist," Blood ’n’ Thunder Annual, 2021
- "From the Scrapbooks: A Letter from George Bruce". Age of Aces. December 8, 2021. A July 28, 1932, letter from George Bruce to fan Robert Alfred O’Neil.
- "From the Scrapbooks: A Seasonal Mystery". Age of Aces. December 24, 2021. A 1932 Happy New Year cartoon from George Bruce, drawn by Jonny Pike.

=== Stories ===
- "'The Laughing Major' by George Bruce". Age of Aces. December 11, 2020. Downloadable story from Aces, December 1931.
- "'The Flaming Arrow' by George Bruce". Age of Aces. February 1, 2019. Downloadable story from The Lone Eagle, August 1934.
- "'War Eagle' by George Bruce". Age of Aces. October 16, 2020. Downloadable story from Sky Fighters, November 1937.
