= Lady in the Iron Mask =

1952 film by Ralph Murphy

- Theatrical release poster
- Directed by: Ralph Murphy
- Screenplay by: Jack Pollexfen; Aubrey Wisberg
- Based on: The Vicomte de Bragelonne by Alexandre Dumas
- Produced by: Walter Wanger; Eugene Frenke
- Starring: Louis Hayward; Patricia Medina; Alan Hale, Jr.
- Cinematography: Ernest Laszlo
- Edited by: Bruce B. Pierce
- Music by: Dimitri Tiomkin
- Color process: Supercinecolor
- Production company: Walter Wanger Productions
- Distributed by: Twentieth Century-Fox
- Release date: July 4, 1952
- Running time: 78 minutes
- Country: United States
- Language: English

Lady in the Iron Mask is a 1952 American Supercinecolor historical adventure film directed by Ralph Murphy, produced by Walter Wanger and starring Louis Hayward, Patricia Medina, Alan Hale Jr., Judd Holdren and Steve Brodie. The film is a reworking of Allan Dwan's 1929 screen epic The Iron Mask, an adaptation of the last section of the 1847-1850 novel The Vicomte de Bragelonne by Alexandre Dumas, which is based on the French legend of the Man in the Iron Mask. The film's sets were designed by the art director Martin Obzina.

== Cast ==
- Louis Hayward as D'Artagnan
- Patricia Medina as Princess Anne/Princess Louise
- John Sutton as Duke de Valdac
- Steve Brodie as Athos
- Alan Hale Jr. as Porthos
- Judd Holdren as Aramis
- Hal Gerard as Philip of Spain
- Lester Matthews as Prime Minister Rochard
- John Dehner as Count de Fourrier
- Keith Hitchcock as Chevalier La Porte
- Esther Howard as Madame Duprez
- Tor Johnson as Renac
