= Arasilankumari =

1961 film by A. S. A. Sami and A. Kasilingam

- Theatrical release poster
- Directed by: A. S. A. Sami; A. Kasilingam
- Screenplay by: A. S. A. Sami
- Story by: M. Karunanidhi
- Produced by: M. Somasundaram
- Starring: M. G. Ramachandran; Padmini; Rajasulochana
- Cinematography: P. Dattu; P. Ramasamy
- Edited by: G. D. Joshi; M. Kannan; N. P. Sarathi
- Music by: G. Ramanathan
- Production company: Jupiter Pictures
- Release date: 1 January 1961
- Running time: 140 minutes
- Country: India
- Language: Tamil

Arasilankumari (transl. Princess) is a 1961 Indian Tamil-language historical adventure film directed by A. S. A. Sami and A. Kasilingam, and produced by M. Somasundaram under Jupiter Pictures. An adaptation of the 1952 film Scaramouche, itself based on a 1921 novel of the same name, it stars M. G. Ramachandran, Padmini and Rajasulochana. The film was originally directed by Sami, and completed by Kasilingam. It was released on 1 January 1961, and failed commercially.

== Plot ==
Arivazhagan has a sister, Anbukarasi. She falls in love with Vetrivelan, who is the commander-in-chief of the royal army, but he tells Anbukarasi and Arivazhagan that he is just an ordinary citizen of the kingdom and marries Anbukarasi. Arivazhagan leaves on a mission after his sister's marriage. After some time, Vetrivelan deserts his wife and child and returns to the palace. He starts plotting against the royal family. How his plans are thwarted by the hero and how his wife fights for him against her own brother form the rest of the film.

== Cast ==
- M. G. Ramachandran as Arivazhagan
- Padmini as Anbukarasi
- Rajasulochana as Azhagurani
- R. Muthuraman as Pulikesi
- M. N. Nambiar as Vetrivelan
- K. A. Thangavelu as Kalaimani
- Sandow M. M. A. Chinnappa Thevar (guest appearance)
- R. Nagendra Rao
- S. A. Ashokan as Manimara Bhoopathi
- T. A. Mathuram
- M. Saroja as Annam

== Production ==
Arasilankumari was adapted from the 1952 film version of the Rafael Sabatini novel Scaramouche. It took as long as five years to complete. The film was originally directed by A. S. A. Sami, who had differences with the cast and crew; he was replaced by A. Kasilingam who completed the film. This was the final film produced by Jupiter Pictures. Editor Mohan, uncredited, made his debut as an editor through his film although his second film Ellarum Innattu Mannar (1960) was released first.

== Soundtrack ==
The music was composed by G. Ramanathan. The song "Chinna Payale" was later adapted into "Thiruttu Payale" by Bharadwaj for the 2006 film of the same name, with additional lyrics by Vairamuthu.

| Song | Singers | Lyrics | Length |
|---|---|---|---|
| "Chinna Payale Chinna Payale" | T. M. Soundararajan | Pattukkottai Kalyanasundaram | 03:39 |
| "Etramunnaa Etram" | T. M. Soundararajan & Seerkazhi Govindarajan | Pattukkottai Kalyanasundaram | 03:11 |
| "Kandi Kadhirkamam...Kazhugumalai Pazhanimalai" | Seerkazhi Govindarajan | Pattukkottai Kalyanasundaram | 01:58 |
| "Nandhavanatthil Or Aandi" | T. M. Soundararajan | Pattukkottai Kalyanasundaram | 00:54 |
| "Setthaalum Unnai Naan Vida Maatten" | N. S. Krishnan & S. C. Krishnan | Pattukkottai Kalyanasundaram | 03:32 |
| "Thillaalangadi Thillaalangadi" | P. Susheela | Kannadasan | 03:32 |
| "Thaaraa Avar Varuvaaraa" | S. Janaki | Ku. Ma. Balasubramaniam | 03:36 |
| "Oorvalamaaga Maappillai Pennum" | Soolamangalam Jayalakshmi, T. M. Soundararajan & P. Susheela | R. Pazhanichami | 02:19 |
| "Atthaane Aasai Atthaane" | P. Leela | K. S. Gopalakrishnan | 02:10 |
| "Thoondiyile Maattikkittu Muzhikkudhu" | K. Jamuna Rani, Seerkazhi Govindarajan & S. C. Krishnan | Muthukoothan | 02:39 |
| "Aav Aaahaav En Aasai Purave Aav" | P. Susheela | Udumalai Narayana Kavi | 03:23 |

== Release and reception ==
Arasilankumari was released on 1 January 1961. Kanthan of Kalki appreciated Nambiar's two contrasting performances of the same character. The film was not commercially successful, with historian Randor Guy attributing it to the prolonged production schedule.

== Bibliography ==
- Rajadhyaksha, Ashish; Willemen, Paul (1998) [1994]. Encyclopaedia of Indian Cinema. British Film Institute and Oxford University Press. ISBN 0-19-563579-5.
