= The Gates of Doom =

The Gates of Doom may refer to:

- The Gates of Doom (film), a 1914 novel by Rafael Sabatini
- The Gates of Doom (novel), a 1917 American silent drama film
