= Galley slave =

Person enslaved or sentenced to row in a galley

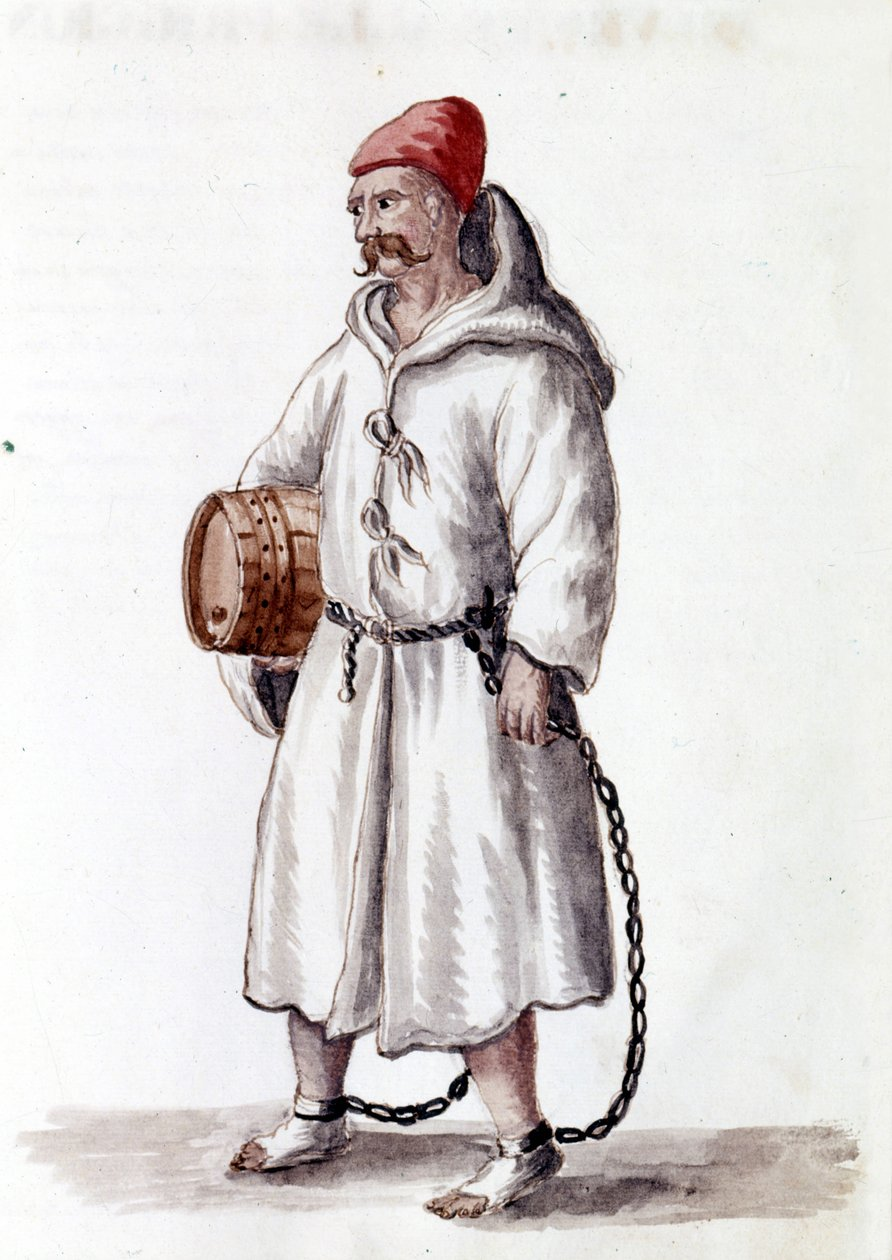
A galley slave of the Venetian navy

A galley slave was a slave rowing in a galley, either a convicted criminal sentenced to work at the oar (French: galérien), or a kind of human chattel, sometimes a prisoner of war, assigned to the duty of rowing. In the ancient Mediterranean, galley rowers were mostly free men, and slaves were used as rowers when manpower was in high demand. In the Middle Ages and the early modern period, convicts and prisoners of war often manned galleys, and the Barbary corsairs enslaved captives as galley slaves. During the 18th and 19th centuries, pirates in Asia likewise manned their galleys with captives.

== History ==
Ancient Mediterranean navies relied on professional rowers to man their galleys. Slaves were seldom used except in times of pressing manpower demands or extreme emergency. In the 5th and 4th centuries BC, Athens generally followed a naval policy of enrolling citizens from the lower classes (thetes), metics (foreigners resident in Athens) and hired foreigners. In the drawn-out Second Punic War, Rome and Carthage resorted to slave rowers to some extent, but only in specific cases and often with the promise of freedom after victory was achieved.

A painting of the 1571 Battle of Lepanto in the Ionian Sea, where both sides relied on tens of thousands of slaves, prisoners or convicts as oarsmen.

Only at the end of the Late Middle Ages did slaves begin to be increasingly employed as rowers. It also became the custom among the Mediterranean powers to sentence condemned criminals to row in the war-galleys of the state (initially only in time of war). Traces of this practice appear in France as early as 1532, but the first legislative enactment comes in the Ordonnance d'Orléans of 1561. In 1564 Charles IX of France forbade the sentencing of prisoners to the galleys for fewer than ten years. Brands of the fleur-de-lis, as well the letters V (for voleur, meaning thief) and GAL were used to identify the prisoners condemned as galley-slaves.

Naval forces from both Christian and Muslim countries often turned prisoners of war into galley-slaves. Thus, at the Battle of Lepanto in 1571, 12,000 Christian galley slaves were freed from the Ottoman Turks. Lepanto was the last major battle fought between fleets of oar-powered ships, but Mediterranean navies continued to use the ships for some years thereafter.

The Knights Hospitaller made use of galley slaves and debtors (buonavoglia) to row their galleys during their rule over the Maltese Islands.

In 1622, Saint Vincent de Paul, as a former slave himself (in Tunis), became chaplain to the galleys and ministered to the galley slaves.

In 1687 the governor of New France, Jacques-René de Brisay de Denonville, seized, chained, and shipped 50 Haudenosaunee chiefs from Fort Frontenac to Marseille, France, to be used as galley slaves.

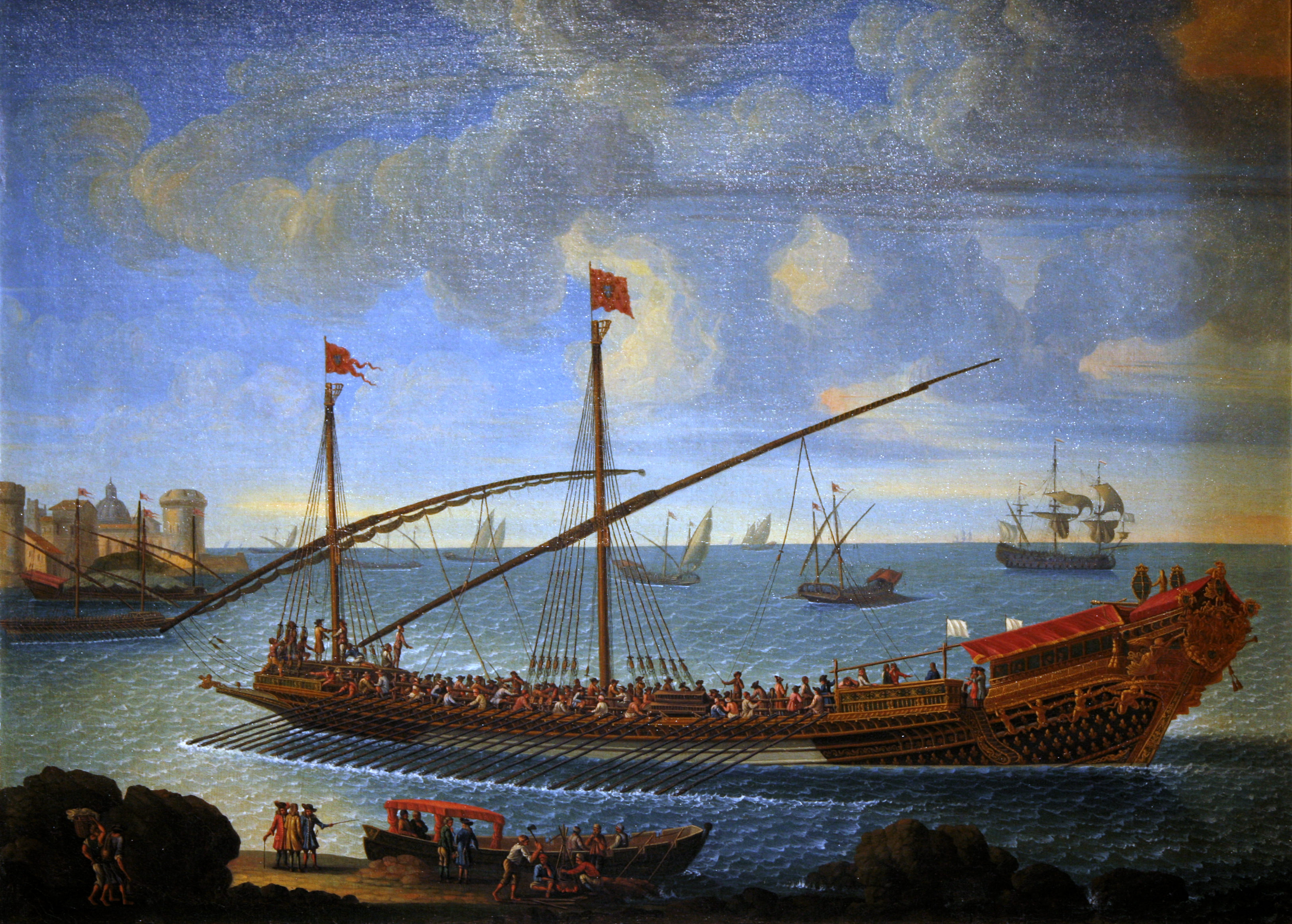
A réale galley belonging to the Mediterranean fleet of Louis XIV, the largest galley force of the late 17th century; oil on canvas, c. 1694

King Louis XIV of France, who wanted a bigger fleet, ordered that the courts should sentence men to the galleys as often as possible, even in times of peace; he even sought to transform the death penalty to sentencing to the galleys for life (and unofficially did so—a letter exists to all French judges, that they should, if possible, sentence men to life in the galleys instead of death). By the end of the reign of Louis XIV in 1715 the use of the galley for war purposes had practically ceased, but the French Navy did not incorporate the corps of the galleys until 1748. From the reign of Henry IV, Toulon functioned as a naval military port, Marseille having become a merchant port, and served as the headquarters of the galleys and of the convict rowers (galériens). After the incorporation of the galleys, the system sent the majority of these latter to Toulon, the others to Rochefort and to Brest, where they worked in the arsenal.

Convict rowers also went to a large number of other French and non-French cities: Nice, Le Havre, Nîmes, Lorient, Cherbourg, Saint-Vaast-la-Hougue, La Spezia, Antwerp and Civitavecchia; but Toulon, Brest and Rochefort predominated. At Toulon the convicts remained (in chains) on the galleys, which were moored as hulks in the harbour. Their shore prisons had the name bagnes ("baths"), a name given to such penal establishments first by the Italians (bagno), and allegedly deriving from the prison at Constantinople situated close by or attached to the great baths there.

All French convicts continued to use the name galérien even after galleys went out of use; only after the French Revolution did the new authorities officially change the hated name—with all it signified—to forçat ("forced"). The use of the term galérien nevertheless continued until 1873, when the last bagne in France (as opposed to the bagnes relocated to French Guiana), the bagne of Toulon, closed definitively. In Spain, the word galeote continued in use as late as the early 19th century for a criminal condemned to penal servitude. In Italian the word galera is still in use for a prison.

A vivid account of the life of galley-slaves in France appears in Jean Marteilhes's Memoirs of a Protestant, translated by Oliver Goldsmith, which describes the experiences of one of the Huguenots who suffered after the revocation of the Edict of Nantes in 1685.

Madame de Sevigne, a revered French author, wrote from Paris on April 10, 1671 (Letter VII): "I went to walk at Vincennes, en Troche* and by the way met with a string of galley-slaves; they were going to Marseilles, and will be there in about a month. Nothing could have been surer than this mode of conveyance, but another thought came into my head, which was to go with them myself. There was one Duval among them, who appeared to be a convertible man. You will see them when they come in, and I suppose you would have been agreeably surprised to have seen me in the midst of the crowd of women that accompany them."

Galley-slaves lived in unsavoury conditions, so even though some sentences prescribed a restricted number of years, most rowers would eventually die, even if they survived the conditions, shipwreck and slaughter or torture at the hands of enemies or of pirates. Additionally, nobody ensured that prisoners were freed after completing their sentences. As a result, imprisonment for 10 years could in reality mean imprisonment for life because nobody except the prisoner would either notice or care.

=== Notable galley slaves in Europe ===
- John Knox
- Piet Pieterszoon Hein
- Dragut
- Jean Parisot de Valette

=== Americas ===
In North American colonies galleys employed Black slaves as rowers, as did the Portuguese, and the Spanish in Latin America, the French in Canada employed Iroquois and other local indigenous tribes as well. American Revolutionary War navies had row galleys, negro slaves escaped from galleys frequently, and were searched for by slave catchers, deserted slave search advertisements were routinely posted in the American newspapers during the war, typically offering $8 to $20 reward for bringing an escaped slave back on board.

=== Africa ===
The Barbary corsairs of the 16th to 19th centuries used galley slaves, often captured Europeans from Italy or Spain. The Ottoman Sultan in Istanbul also used galley slaves.

==== Notable galley slaves in North Africa ====
- Miguel de Cervantes

=== Asia ===
In Southeast Asia, from the mid-18th to the late-19th centuries, the lanong and garay warships of the Iranun and Banguingui pirates were crewed entirely with male galley slaves captured from previous raids. Conditions were brutal and it was not uncommon for galley slaves to die on voyages from exhaustion. Slaves were kept bound to their stations and were fed poorly. Slaves who mistimed their strokes were caned by overseers. Most of the slaves were Tagalogs, Visayans, and "Malays" (including Bugis, Mandarese, Iban, and Makassar). There were also occasional European and Chinese captives.

== In fiction ==
A short account of his ten years as a galley-slave is given by the character Farrabesche in "The Village Rector" by Honoré de Balzac. He is sentenced to the galleys as a result of his life as a "chauffeur" (in this case the word refers to a brigand who threatened landowners by roasting them).

In one of his ill-fated adventures, Miguel de Cervantes's Don Quixote frees a row of prisoners being sent to the galleys, including Ginés de Pasamonte. The prisoners, however, beat him. (Cervantes himself had been captured in 1575 and served as a galley slave in Algiers for five years before he was ransomed).

In The Sea Hawk, a 1919 historical fiction novel by Rafael Sabatini, as well as the 1924 film based on the novel, the protagonist, Sir Oliver Tressilian, is sold into galley slavery by a relative.

The Sea Hawk (1940) was originally intended to be a new version of the Sabatini novel, but the studio switched to a story whose protagonist, Geoffrey Thorpe, was loosely based on Sir Francis Drake, although Drake was never a galley slave. Howard Koch was working on the script when war broke out in Europe, and the final story deliberately draws vivid parallels between Spain and the Nazi Reich. The existence of galley slaves and the misery they endure is set up as a metaphor for life under the Reich. When Thorpe (Errol Flynn) liberates a Spanish vessel full of English captives, the freed men row willingly for home to "Strike for the Shores of Dover", the stirring music of score composer Erich Wolfgang Korngold and lyrics by Howard Koch and Jack Scholl. The first verse "Pull on the oars! Freedom is yours! Strike for the shores of Dover!" evoked the recent evacuation from Dunkirk. The sets in the 1940 film appear historically accurate.

In Lew Wallace's novel, Ben-Hur: A Tale of the Christ, Judah is sent to the galleys as a murderer but manages to survive a shipwreck and save the fleet leader, who frees and adopts him. Films based on the novel — including Ben-Hur: A Tale of the Christ (1925) and Ben-Hur (1959) — perpetuate the historically inaccurate image of Roman galley slaves.

In the 1943 epic novel The Long Ships, the protagonist, Orm Tostesson, is captured while raiding in Andalusia and serves as a galley slave for a number of years.

The 1947 French film Monsieur Vincent shows Saint Vincent de Paul taking the place of a weakened slave at his oar.

Steven Saylor's Roma Sub Rosa series (covering a period from 92 B.C. to 44 B.C ) includes a novel Arms of Nemesis, which contains an appalling description of the conditions under which galley slaves lived and worked—assuming that they did exist in Rome at that time (see above).

In Mr. Midshipman Hornblower, C. S. Forester writes in detail of an encounter during the 1790s when a becalmed British convoy is attacked off Gibraltar by two of a small number of galleys retained in service by the conservative Spanish navy. The author notes the stench emanating from these galleys due to each carrying two hundred condemned prisoners chained permanently to the rowing benches.

Patrick O'Brian wrote of encounters with galleys in the Mediterranean in Master and Commander emphasising the galley's speed and manoeuvrability compared to sailing ships when there was little wind.

In Victor Hugo's Les Misérables, Jean Valjean was a galley prisoner, and was in danger of returning to the galleys. Police inspector Javert's father was also a galley prisoner.

Robert E. Howard transplanted the institute of galley slavery to his mythical Hyborian Age, depicting Conan the Barbarian as organizing a rebellion of galley slaves who kill the crew, take over the ship and make him their captain in one novel (Conan the Conqueror serialized in Weird Tales 1935–1936).

In Ursula K. Le Guin's Earthsea series, multiple references are made to galley slaves; in The Farthest Shore specifically, Prince Arren is rescued from captivity, and notes the galley slaves imprisoned with him on the ship.
