= The Sea Hawk (1940 film) =

1940 film by Michael Curtiz

- Theatrical release poster
- Directed by: Michael Curtiz
- Written by: Howard Koch; Seton I. Miller
- Produced by: Henry Blanke; Hal B. Wallis
- Starring: Errol Flynn; Brenda Marshall; Claude Rains
- Cinematography: Sol Polito
- Edited by: George Amy
- Music by: Erich Wolfgang Korngold
- Distributed by: Warner Bros. Pictures
- Release date: August 10, 1940 (New York City)
- Running time: 127 minutes
- Country: United States
- Language: English
- Budget: $1,701,211
- Box office: $2,678,000 $2 million (US); 3,280,538 admissions (France) (1947)

The Sea Hawk is a 1940 American swashbuckling pirate adventure film produced and distributed by Warner Bros. Pictures that stars Errol Flynn as an English privateer who defends his nation's interests on the eve of the launch of the Spanish Armada. The film was the tenth collaboration between Flynn and director Michael Curtiz. Its screenplay was written by Howard Koch and Seton I. Miller. The rousing musical score by Erich Wolfgang Korngold is recognized as a high point in his career, along with The Adventures of Robin Hood (1938).

The film was both an adventure film and a period piece about Elizabethan England's struggles with Spain, but it was also meant as a pro-British propaganda film to build morale during World War II and to influence the American public into having a more pro-British outlook.

== Plot ==
King Philip II of Spain declares his intention to destroy England as a first step to world conquest, eager to make his empire reach from Northern Europe to China and India. He sends Don Álvarez as his ambassador to allay the suspicions of Queen Elizabeth I about the great armada he is building to invade England. In England, some of the queen's ministers plead with her to build a fleet, which she hesitates to do in order to spare the purses of her subjects.

The ambassador's ship is captured en route to England by the Albatross and her captain, Geoffrey Thorpe. Don Álvarez and his niece Doña María are taken aboard and transported to England. Thorpe immediately is enchanted by Doña María and gallantly returns her plundered jewels. Her detestation of him softens as she too begins to fall in love.

Don Álvarez is granted an audience with the queen and complains about his treatment; Doña María is accepted as one of her maids of honour. The "Sea Hawks", a group of English privateers who raid Spanish merchant shipping, appear before the queen, who scolds them (at least publicly) for their activities and for endangering the peace with Spain. Captain Thorpe proposes in private a plan to seize a Spanish treasure fleet coming back from Spain's colonies in the Americas. The queen is wary of Spain's reaction, but allows Thorpe to proceed.

Suspicious, Lord Wolfingham, one of the queen's ministers and a secret Spanish collaborator, sends a spy to try to discover where the Albatross is really heading. Upon visiting the chartmaker responsible for drawing the charts for Thorpe's next voyage, Don Álvarez and Lord Wolfingham determine that he is sailing to the Isthmus of Panama and order the captain of Don Álvarez's ship to sail ahead to set up an ambush.

When the Albatross reaches its destination, the ship is spotted. Thorpe's crew seizes the caravan, but fall into a well-laid trap and are driven into the swamps. Thorpe and a few other survivors return to their ship, only to find it in Spanish hands. They are taken to Spain, tried by the Inquisition, and sentenced to life imprisonment as galley slaves. In England, Don Álvarez informs the queen of Thorpe's fate, causing his niece to faint. The queen expels him from her court.

On a Spanish galley, Thorpe meets an Englishman named Abbott who was captured trying to uncover evidence of the Armada's true purpose. The prisoners manage to take over the ship during the night. They board another ship in the harbor, where an emissary has stored secret incriminating plans. Thorpe and his men sail both ships back to England with the plans.

Upon reaching port, Thorpe tries to warn the queen. A carriage bringing Don Álvarez to the ship which, unknown to him, Thorpe has captured, also brings his niece. Don Álvarez boards the ship and is held prisoner, while Captain Thorpe, dressed in the uniform of a Spanish courtier, sneaks into the carriage carrying Doña María, who has decided to stay in England and wait for Thorpe's return. The two finally declare their love for each other, and María helps Thorpe to sneak into the palace. However, Lord Wolfingham's spy spots Thorpe and alerts the castle guards to stop the carriage and take Thorpe prisoner. Thorpe escapes and enters the queen's residence, fending off guards all the while.

Eventually, Thorpe runs into Lord Wolfingham and kills the traitor in a swordfight. With Doña María's assistance, Thorpe reaches the queen and provides proof of King Philip's intentions. Elizabeth knights Thorpe and declares her intention to build a great fleet to oppose the Spanish threat.

== Cast ==
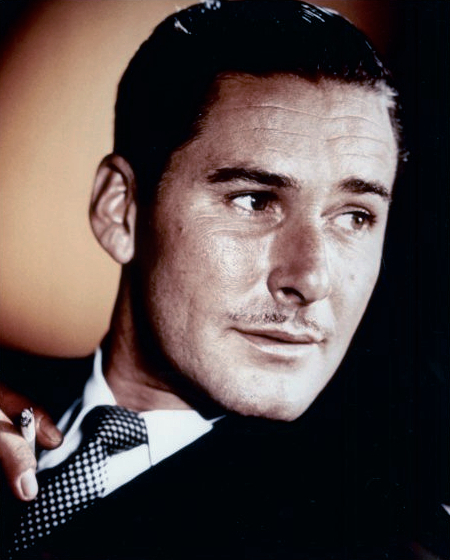
Flynn, c. 1940

- Errol Flynn as Geoffrey Thorpe
- Brenda Marshall as Doña María
- Claude Rains as Don José Álvarez de Córdoba
- Donald Crisp as Sir John Burleson
- Flora Robson as Queen Elizabeth I of England
- Alan Hale as Carl Pitt
- Henry Daniell as Lord Wolfingham
- Una O'Connor as Miss Latham, Doña María's English duenna
- James Stephenson as Abbott
- Gilbert Roland as Captain López, Don José's sea captain
- William Lundigan as Danny Logan
- Julien Mitchell as Oliver Scott
- Montagu Love as King Philip II of Spain
- J. M. Kerrigan as Eli Matson
- David Bruce as Martin Burke
- Clifford Brooke as William Tuttle
- Clyde Cook as Walter Boggs
- Fritz Leiber Sr. as Inquisitor
- Ellis Irving as Monty Preston
- Francis McDonald as Samuel Kroner
- Pedro de Córdoba as Captain Mendoza
- Ian Keith as Peralta
- Jack La Rue as Lieutenant Ortega
- Halliwell Hobbes as Astronomer
- Alec Craig as Jodocus Hondius
- Victor Varconi as General Aguirre
- Robert Warwick as Captain Frobisher
- Guy Bellis as Captain Hawkins
- Harry Cording as Slavemaster
- Leyland Hodgson as Officer
- Leo White as Bit Role (uncredited)
- Edgar Buchanan as Ben Rollins (uncredited)

== Production ==
The portions of the film set in the Americas are painted in sepiatone.

The film was announced in June 1936 and would star Errol Flynn, then coming off his success with Captain Blood.

Originally planned as an adaptation of Rafael Sabatini's 1915 novel The Sea Hawk, the film used an entirely different story inspired by the exploits of Sir Francis Drake, unlike the 1924 silent film adaptation, which was fairly faithful to Sabatini's plot (which, in turn, was very similar to the plot of Captain Blood).

Adaptations of the novel were written by Richard Neville and Delmer Daves before Seton I. Miller wrote a basically new story titled Beggars of the Sea based on Sir Francis Drake. Sabatini's name was still used in promotional materials however as it was felt it had commercial value. Howard Koch then reworked Miller's script while still keeping the basic structure and story.

== Music ==
The music was written by composer Erich Wolfgang Korngold. When The Sea Hawk opened in theatres, a commercial recording was not contemplated. It was not until 1962 that a bit of music from the film was released on an LP titled Music by Erich Wolfgang Korngold. Ten years later Charles Gerhardt and Korngold's son George included 6:53 minutes of The Sea Hawk score on RCA's album The Classic Film Scores of Erich Wolfgang Korngold. A complete re-recording was issued in 2007 by the Naxos label, recorded with the Moscow Symphony Orchestra and Chorus led by William T. Stromberg and reconstructed by John W. Morgan.

== Propaganda purpose ==
Although The Sea Hawk was primarily an adventure film and a period piece about Elizabethan England's struggles with Spain, it was also intended to help build British morale during World War II and to influence the American public into having a more pro-British outlook. King Philip of Spain was presented as an allegorical Hitler, and the queen's speech at the close of the film was meant to inspire the British audience, which was already in the grip of the war. Suggestions that it was the duty of all free men to defend liberty, and that the world did not belong to any one man (an obvious reference to Hitler's conquest of much of Europe), were intended to be rousing. (The same theme had been visited in Alexander Korda's film Fire Over England, released three years earlier, before World War II started).

== Reception ==
=== Critical ===
Bosley Crowther wrote in The New York Times,

Of course, [the film] is all historically cockeyed, and the amazing exploits of Mr. Flynn, accomplished by him in the most casual and expressionless manner, are quite as incredible as the adventures of Dick Tracy. But Flora Robson makes an interesting Queen Elizabeth, Claude Rains and Henry Daniell play a couple of villainous conspirators handsomely, there is a lot of brocaded scenery and rich Elizabethan costumes and, of course, there is Brenda Marshall to shed a bit of romantic light. And, when you come right down to it, that's about all one can expect in an overdressed "spectacle" film which derives much more from the sword than from the pen.

A review in Time observed that:

The Sea Hawk (Warner) is 1940's lustiest assault on the double feature. It cost $1,700,000, exhibits Errol Flynn and 3,000 other cinemactors performing every imaginable feat of spectacular derring-do, and lasts two hours and seven minutes...Produced by Warner's Hal Wallis with a splendor that would set parsimonious Queen Bess's teeth on edge, constructed of the most tried-&-true cinema materials available, The Sea Hawk is a handsome, shipshape picture. To Irish [sic] Cinemactor Errol Flynn, it gives the best swashbuckling role he has had since Captain Blood. For Hungarian Director Michael Curtiz, who took Flynn from bit-player ranks to make Captain Blood and has made nine pictures with him since, it should prove a high point in their profitable relationship.

Filmink called it "pretty close to perfection as these things go." This movie has a one hundred percent rating based on twelve critic reviews on Rotten Tomatoes.

=== Box office ===
The film had been in planning since Errol Flynn's success in the swashbuckler epic Captain Blood. According to Warner Bros records, the film was Warners' most expensive and most popular film of 1940. It made $1,631,000 in the U.S. and $1,047,000 in other markets. Upon release in 1940, the film was among the higher grossing films of the year, and in several states (including Florida, Alabama, Georgia, South Carolina, North Carolina and Virginia) it was the highest grossing film of the year, and in several others (including Tennessee, Mississippi, Kentucky and Arkansas), it was the second highest grossing film of the year, coming behind Rebecca.

=== 1947 re-release ===
The film was re-released to great popularity in 1947. It was one of the most popular films that screened in France that year.

== Awards and honors ==
The film was nominated for four 13th Academy Awards:

- Art Direction (Black-and-White) (Anton Grot)
- Original Score (Erich Wolfgang Korngold)
- Sound Recording (Nathan Levinson)
- Special Effects (Byron Haskin, Nathan Levinson)

== Home media ==
The 2005 DVD release from Warner Home Video includes a 1940 Movietone News newsreel of the Battle of Britain, the short Alice in Movieland, the original theatrical trailer, the Looney Tunes cartoon Porky's Poor Fish, and a 20-minute featurette The Sea Hawk: Flynn in Action about the film's production. The 2018 Blu-ray release from the Warner Archive Collection includes all of the bonus features from the DVD release, with the original theatrical trailer along with Porky's Poor Fish being remastered in HD 1080p.

Colorized versions of The Sea Hawk were broadcast on American television and distributed on VHS tape in 1986. Only the black-and-white, edited version (109 minutes) and the fully restored/uncut version (127 minutes) have been released on the DVD and Blu-ray formats. No plans have been announced to release the colorized version on DVD or Blu-ray.
