= Esprit-Jean de Rome d'Ardène =

Esprit-Jean de Rome d'Ardène (3 March 1684, Marseille – 27 March 1748, Marseille aged 64) was an 18th-century French fabulist.

== Life ==
Esprit-Jean de Rome d'Ardène was the son of Honoré de Rome sieur d’Ardène, "commissaire des galleys et inspecteur des bois et forêts de Provence" who had the Château d’Ardène built in 1686 and Antoinette Leroy, daughter of Jean Leroy, conseiller du Roi et contrôleur général de la marine du Levant et des galères de France. His younger brother, father Jean-Paul de Rome d'Ardène (1690-1769) was a well known botanist and agronomist, author of several reference books.

== Publications ==
1747 sees the publication of the book Recueil de fables nouvelles, précédées d'un discours sur ce genre de poésie After Esprit-Jean de Rome d'Ardène died in 1748, his brother, father Jean-Paul de Rome d'Ardène, gathered his various writings in order to compile and publish them. A few years later, in 1767, a Marseille editor, Jean Mossy, published the Œuvres posthumes de Monsieur d'Ardene, associé a l'académie des Belles-Lettres de Marseille in four volumes
