= Gamester =

Gamester or The Gamester may refer to:

- The Gamester (Centlivre), a 1705 play by Susanna Centlivre
- The Gamester (Moore), a 1753 play by Edward Moore
- The Gamester (novel), a 1949 novel by Rafael Sabatini
- The Gamester (Shirley), a 1633 play by James Shirley
- The Gamesters, a 1920 American silent film

== See also ==
- Russ Gamester (born 1965), American auto racing driver
- The Compleat Gamester, a 1674 English-language games compendia
