= Buonavoglia =

Middle Ages term for paid rowering men

Buonavoglia (Italian, "good will") was a term used for a free, paid rower in the European armadas from the Middle Ages. They were hired especially by the republics of Venice and Genoa to serve as oarsmen in their galley fleets, and their usage lasted to the end of rowing ships in the late modern period.

== Characteristics ==
Buonavoglia rowed in exchange for a payment, in opposition to galley slaves, known instead as zontaroli. Like galley slaves, they were usually chained to the oar, but during battles they were released so they could abandon ship and save their lives in case of sinking. It was also usual to allow them to wield weapons if it was necessary for them to join the battle. In outstanding performance, they would be awarded prizes.

== History ==
For most of its history, Genoa employed solely freed rowers. Only by the end of the Chioggia War in 1381 that they started using slave rowers to reduce expenses. However, buonavoglia continued being a fixture of Genoese fleets, with showings like the 1519 Battle of Pianosa, where Andrea Doria's flotilla was crewed by free rowers due to a lack of slaves. Similarly, Venice fielded only buonavoglia recruited from Dalmatia and Greece, by either levy or payment. Only in March 1545, after Cristoforo Canal had insisted to use enslaved rowers to reduce costs after the defeat of Preveza seven years earlier, the Venetian senate instated the custom.

Aside from hiring regular buonavoglia, Knights Hospitaller often signed contracts of indentured servitude where the signers would serve a measure of time as a rower in exchange for their debt to be cleared. As galley slaves in Hospitaller ships were often Muslim and Jewish prisoners of war, their free counterparts were expected to watch over possible rebellions aboard.

Buonavoglia hired by the Spanish Empire were called buenas boyas, a corruption of the term. Spanish viceroy Pedro Téllez-Girón, Duke of Osuna used many paid rowers in his fleets, and offered galley slaves to remain in their jobs in exchange for a salary when they served all of their time.

== See also ==
- Galley slave
- Condottiero
