= King in Prussia (novel) =

1944 novel

- First edition
- Author: Rafael Sabatini
- Language: English
- Genre: Historical
- Publisher: Hutchinson
- Publication date: 1944
- Publication place: United Kingdom
- Media type: Print
- Pages: 308

King in Prussia is a 1944 historical novel by the Italian-born British writer Rafael Sabatini. It portrays the formative years of Frederick the Great, who ruled Prussia during the eighteenth century. It was released in the United States under the alternative title The Birth of Mischief.

== Bibliography ==
- Daniel S. Burt. The Biography Book: A Reader's Guide to Nonfiction, Fictional, and Film Biographies of More Than 500 of the Most Fascinating * Individuals of All Time. Greenwood Publishing Group, 2001
