= Venetian Masque =

1934 novel

- First edition
- Author: Rafael Sabatini
- Language: English
- Genre: Historical adventure
- Publisher: Hutchinson (UK); McClelland & Stewart (CAN)
- Publication date: 1934
- Publication place: United Kingdom
- Media type: Print

Venetian Masque is a 1934 adventure novel written by the Anglo-Italian writer Rafael Sabatini.

It is set in the 1790s, around the time of the invasion by Napoleon Bonaparte which led to the fall of the Republic of Venice. The hero is the Vicomte de Saulx, a French aristocrat supposedly guillotined during the French Revolution, who enters the world of espionage in Venice.
