= The Gates of Doom (novel) =

1914 novel

- First American edition
- Author: Rafael Sabatini
- Language: English
- Genre: Historical adventure
- Publisher: Stanley Paul & Co (UK)
- Publication date: 1914
- Publication place: United Kingdom
- Media type: Print

The Gates of Doom is a 1914 historical adventure novel by the British–Italian writer Rafael Sabatini. It was first published in the United States in 1926 by Houghton Mifflin.

In 1917 it was adapted into a silent film of the same title directed by Charles Swickard. In 1919 it was adapted again, in Britain, again with the same title, this time directed by Sidney M. Goldin and starring Maria Zola.

== Plot summary ==
In the early eighteenth century, during the reign of George I, Jacobite agent Captain Gaynor is instructed by the exiled pretender James III to put his trust in Lord Pauncefort. But Pauncefort has money problems, not helped by his investment in the South Sea Company.
