= Bardelys the Magnificent (novel) =

1906 novel

- Author: Rafael Sabatini
- Language: English
- Genre: Historical; Adventure
- Publication date: 1906
- Publication place: United Kingdom
- Media type: Print

Bardelys the Magnificent is a 1906 historical adventure novel by the Italian-born British writer Rafael Sabatini. It is set in France during the reign of Louis XIII.

In 1926 the story was adapted into a film version Bardelys the Magnificent by the Hollywood studio MGM, with John Gilbert playing the title role.

== Bibliography ==
- Golden, Eve. John Gilbert: The Last of the Silent Film Stars. University Press of Kentucky, 2013.
