= Scaramouche (1952 film) =

1952 American film by George Sidney

- Original film poster
- Directed by: George Sidney
- Written by: Ronald Millar; George Froeschel
- Based on: Scaramouche; 1921 novel by Rafael Sabatini
- Produced by: Carey Wilson
- Starring: Stewart Granger; Eleanor Parker; Janet Leigh; Mel Ferrer
- Cinematography: Charles Rosher
- Edited by: James Newcom
- Music by: Victor Young
- Production company: Metro-Goldwyn-Mayer
- Distributed by: Loew's, Inc.
- Release date: June 27, 1952
- Running time: 115 minutes
- Country: United States
- Language: English
- Budget: $3,005,000
- Box office: $6,746,000

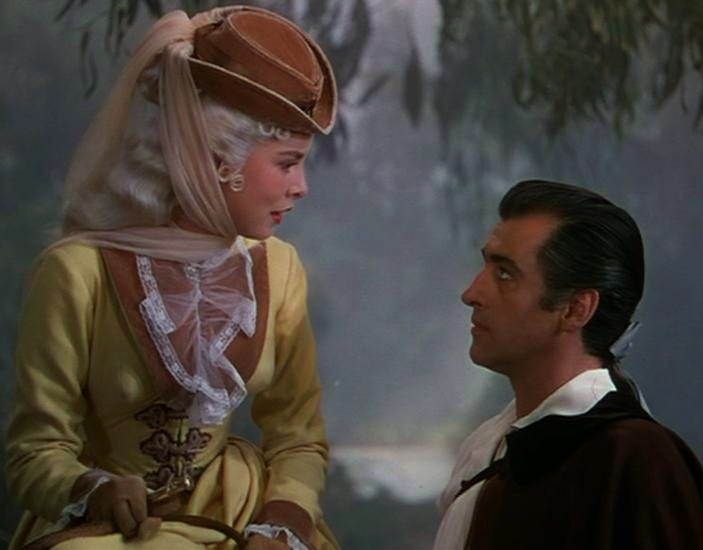
Janet Leigh and Stewart Granger

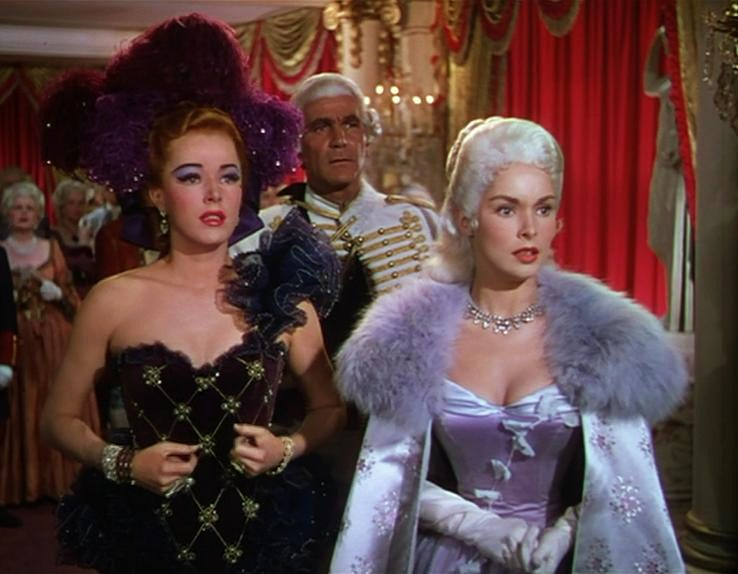
Left to right: Eleanor Parker, Henry Wilcoxon and Janet Leigh

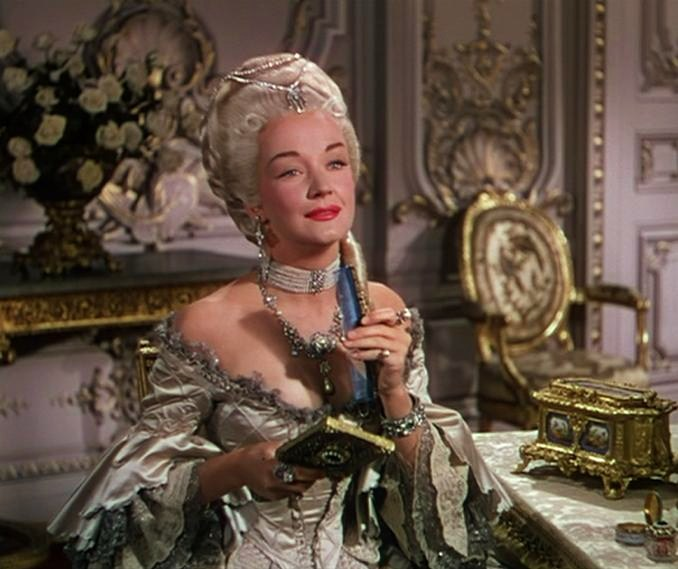
Nina Foch

Scaramouche is a 1952 romantic swashbuckler film starring Stewart Granger, Eleanor Parker, Janet Leigh, and Mel Ferrer. Filmed in Technicolor, the MGM production is loosely based on the 1921 novel Scaramouche by Rafael Sabatini as well as the 1923 film version starring Ramon Novarro. It was directed by George Sidney and produced by Carey Wilson from a screenplay by Ronald Millar and George Froeschel. The original music score was composed by Victor Young and the cinematography by Charles Rosher.

== Plot ==
In France just prior to the French Revolution, Queen Marie Antoinette asks her cousin Noël, the Marquis de Maynes, to uncover the identity of "Marcus Brutus", a dangerous pamphleteer rousing hatred of the aristocracy. She also pressures de Maynes to marry to preserve his line, and at his request for her to choose his bride, he is introduced to Aline de Gavrilac, one of the Queen's wards.

Meanwhile, minor nobleman André Moreau kidnaps his beloved Lénore to keep her from marrying another man. After the two decide to get married, Moreau learns that his best man, Philippe de Valmorin, is in hiding for promoting revolution and distributing pamphlets under the pseudonym Marcus Brutus. Moreau tells de Valmorin to leave Paris, taking Lénore with him. At the same time, Moreau visits his lawyer, Fabien, and forcefully threatens him to disclose the name of his father in order to learn why he has stopped sending an allowance. When Moreau and de Valmorin rendezvous in the woods, it is without Lénore, who, not knowing the identity or motive of de Valmorin, escaped the carriage. They continue on their journey to meet Moreau's father, who is revealed to be the Comte de Gavrillac. Moreau runs into Aline de Gavrillac when her carriage breaks down in the road. They are strongly attracted to each other, but Moreau's ardor suddenly cools when he learns that she is his half-sister. He hides that information from her, partly because of sympathy, when they both enter the House of Gavrillac to see that the Comte has died.

By chance, de Maynes encounters de Valmorin. A master swordsman, de Maynes provokes de Valmorin into a duel, then toys with his inexperienced opponent before finally killing him. Enraged, Moreau attacks, but does no better than his dead friend. After de Maynes easily disarms him several times, Moreau seizes a pistol and vows to kill de Maynes the same way he slew de Valmorin, then flees for his life.

Chased by de Maynes' henchmen, led by the Chevalier de Chabrillaine, Moreau hides out in the commedia dell'arte troupe in which Lenore performs. Forced to disguise himself as the character Scaramouche, he discovers a hidden talent as a performer. Burning for revenge, Moreau seeks out de Maynes' fencing instructor, Doutreval of Dijon, and trains diligently in secret for weeks, while also performing with the troupe. However, de Maynes appears during a training session, and they fight for a second time. Moreau is still overmatched, and is saved only by Aline's unexpected arrival, enabling Moreau to escape (with Doutreval's assistance).

He decides to seek out Doutreval's teacher, Perigore of Paris, the man who according to Doutreval "is the master of all swordsmen." Moreau takes the troupe to Paris for that purpose. There, Dr. Dubuque, a deputy of the new National Assembly, seeks his help. The aristocrats in the assembly are systematically killing off the deputies representing the common people by provoking them into duels. Moreau is not interested, until Dubuque mentions that de Maynes is one of the duelists; then he eagerly accepts the seat of a deceased deputy. Each day, he shows up at the assembly to challenge de Maynes, only to find his enemy absent on trivial but official duties, arranged by Aline, who works with Lénore to protect the man they both love. However, other nobles in the National Assembly are eager to fight the newcomer, challenging him on a daily basis. Moreau wins every duel, killing most of his opponents; the Chevalier de Chabrillaine barely escapes with his life.

In the meantime, de Maynes becomes engaged to Aline. Overhearing de Maynes' intention to confront Moreau that night, Aline persuades him to take her out instead. At the suggestion of de Chabrillaine, they attend a performance of the De Binet Troupe, where Andre seizes his opportunity for revenge. The two men engage in a prolonged duel (reputedly the longest in screen history at about eight minutes) that ranges throughout the theater and finally back onto the stage itself. At the end, Moreau has de Maynes at his mercy, helpless as Philippe de Valmorin had been; but something he cannot explain stays his hand. Moreau stalks off, leaving de Maynes bloodied but alive.

Later, Moreau learns from Philippe's father that he is not the son of the Comte de Gavrillac but of the old Marquis de Maynes, the Comte de Gavrillac's friend. Noël de Maynes thus is his half-brother. Andre then realizes that as he is not related to Aline after all, they can be married. Lénore concedes him to Aline, but consoles herself with a certain Corsican officer, Napoleon Bonaparte.

== Cast ==
- Stewart Granger as André Moreau
- Eleanor Parker as Lénore
- Janet Leigh as Aline de Gavrillac de Bourbon
- Mel Ferrer as Noël, Marquis de Mayne
- Henry Wilcoxon as the Chevalier de Chabrillaine
- Nina Foch as Marie Antoinette
- Richard Anderson as Philippe de Valmorin
- Robert Coote as Gaston Binet
- Lewis Stone as Georges de Valmorin, Philippe's father and André's foster father
- Elisabeth Risdon as Isabelle de Valmorin, Philippe's mother
- Howard Freeman as Michael Vanneau
- Curtis Cooksey as Lawyer Fabian
- John Dehner as Doutreval of Dijon
- Richard Hale as Perigore of Paris
- John Litel as Dr. Dubuque
- Owen McGiveney as Punchinello
- Aram Katcher as Napoleon (uncredited)

== Production ==
=== Development ===
The studio planned to adapt the novel in late 1938, with production set to commence in early 1939, though pre-production did not start until 1950.

Initially, the film was meant to be a Metro-Goldwyn-Mayer (MGM) musical starring Gene Kelly, with Ava Gardner as Lenore and Elizabeth Taylor co-starring as Aline before it was changed to more of a swashbuckling adventure film. Their commitments to the film were confirmed in early 1951. At one point, other than Kelly, Fernando Lamas and Ricardo Montalbán were also considered for the lead.

"I always felt that Scaramouche should have been a musical", said director George Sidney. "It would have needed the most crafty score but it could have been terribly exciting."

However, when Stewart Granger was contracted by the studio after his success in King Solomon's Mines, one of his stipulations was that he star in the then-upcoming Scaramouche project.

Gardner was announced as Granger's co-star. Montalbán was signed to play the Marquis de Maynes, the villain.

Talbot Jennings wrote the first script, Carey Wilson was assigned as producer and Sidney as director.

Eventually, Montalbán was dropped and it was announced Granger would play both the hero and the villain. Taylor was mentioned as a female lead in addition to Gardner.

Granger was then cast in Constable Pedley (later called The Wild North) which required location filming in snow. This meant he left Scaramouche entirely; Montalbán returned to the film as the hero, and Lorenzo Lamas was cast as the villain. Granger went on to shoot part of The Wild North, then production was halted. He made The Light Touch, and then completed The Wild North. MGM then decided to reassign him to Scaramouche, with Lamas staying on as the villain.

Gardner and Taylor became unavailable for casting and were replaced by Eleanor Parker and Janet Leigh. Mel Ferrer replaced Lamas as de Maynes.

Sidney had Parker dye her hair red for the film.

Lewis Stone played the villain, the Marquis de la Tour d'Azyr, in the 1923 silent version.

=== Shooting ===
Granger, who performed most of his stunts himself, took fencing lessons with Jean Heremans when preparing for the role. The 8-minute-long duel in the theater between Granger and Ferrer took eight weeks of preparation, including memorizing eighty-seven fencing passes. Filming this scene left Granger with a wrenched knee, a damaged shoulder, and an injured back. Other accidents on set included Jean Simmons – who was visiting her husband Granger – almost receiving a sword in her face, and a chandelier hitting a mattress upon which Granger was supposed to lie and embedding itself in the stage. He insisted on seeing the chandelier dropped once before shooting the scene.

Nina Foch, who appeared as Marie Antoinette, wore the same costume as Norma Shearer in MGM's 1938 film.

Parker later said that Granger was the only person in her career that she did not get along with:

It wasn't a conflict between the two of us. Everyone disliked this man ... Stewart Granger was a dreadful person, rude ... just awful. Just being in his presence was bad. I thought at one point the crew was going kill him. Jean visited him on the set and would leave his dressing room in tears. He humiliated her. It was terrible. All of the dueling scenes in Scaramouche were wonderful, though. I'll give Granger credit for that. He didn't know how to do any of that, but worked hard and learned. Mel Ferrer, his counterpart in the movie, was extremely adept at the swordplay, but was a gentleman. He could have taken advantage and upstaged Granger, the star, but he never did.

Parker's perception of the fencing in Scaramouche appears to be mistaken. According to Ferrer:

I'd been playing a lot of goody-goodys, making pictures for Metro; and they asked me to do this one. They asked me if I fenced, and I told them, "No." They said, "We thought you were a fencer." And I said, "No, I'm a dancer." They said, "So, what do we do about that?" I said, "It's very simple. I'll learn to fence the way a dancer would learn a routine. If I were learning a ballet, I'd learn it by number. One, two, three, four ... four, you're on this spot; five, six, seven, you do that; that's the way you learn choreography." And I learned how to fence in six weeks.

We did seven duels in the picture, and each one was different; we never repeated a sequence. And that's like learning seven ballets; it's very, very difficult ...

Jimmy [Stewart Granger] knew how to fence already. He'd been in the theater in England, and that's part of the training for actors on the London stage; they learn to fence. They learn how to ride, most all of them learn how to ride horseback. They're so much more developed as performers than we are; they get so much better training.

== Reception ==
=== Critical ===
Bosley Crowther wrote in his The New York Times review, "A cheekier attitude toward romance and a great deal more play with the swords [than the 1923 version] are in this latter-day whip-up, and these are the things that make it fun. ... A little bit slow in getting started—a little bit on the pompous side, with a few rather efflorescent speeches and solemn respects to the queen—the business gets moving in earnest when the leading swashbucklers first cross swords and keeps moving, ever more gaily, until the end of their big climactic duel."

=== Box Office ===
The film earned $2,739,000 at the North American box office in its first year of release. MGM records put its foreign earnings at $4,007,000, and overall the movie made a profit of $1,062,000. The movie was particularly popular in France, with admissions of 2,975,521.

== See also ==
- List of adventure films of the 1950s
- Harlequinade
