= Battle of Pianosa =

16th century naval engagement

Coordinates: 42°48′N 10°00′E

- Part of the wars of Christian powers against the Barbary Corsairs
Date	25 April 1519
Location	Tuscan Archipelago, Tyrrhenian Sea
Result	Genoese Victory

Belligerents
Republic of Genoa	Tunisian corsairs

Commanders and leaders
(Republic of Genoa) Andrea Doria (Republic of Genoa) Filippino Doria	Kaid Ali (POW)

Strength
6 galleys	1 galley; 7 to 20 fustes (depending on accounts)

Casualties and losses
Heavy	500 dead; 25 captured; 1 galley captured; at least 5 fustes captured; several fustes sunk

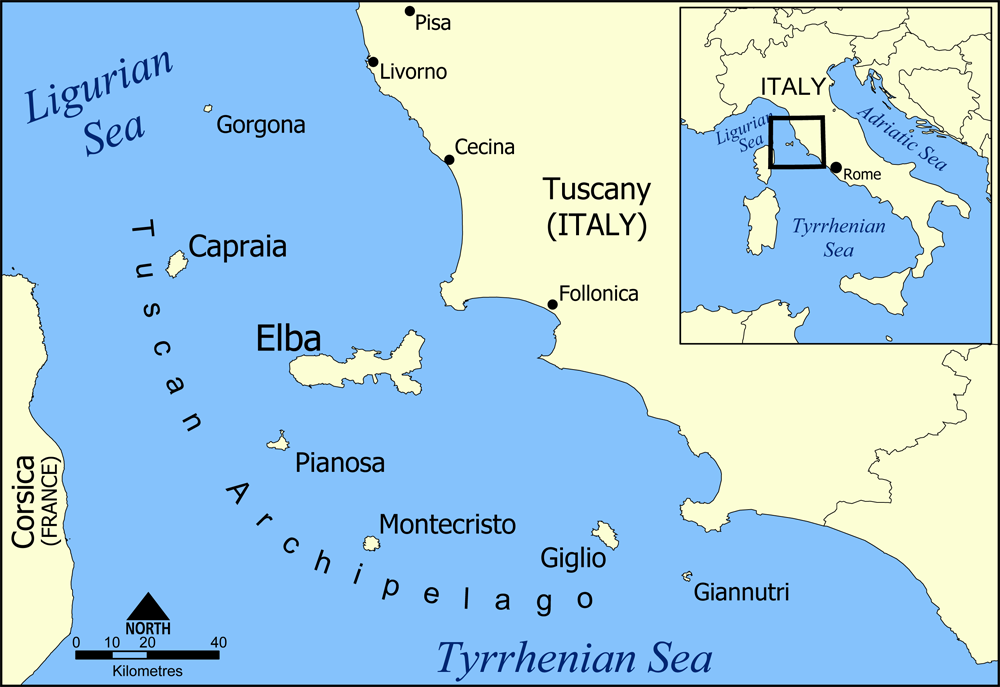
The Tuscan archipelago

The Battle of Pianosa was a naval engagement which took place on 25 April, 1519, when a Genoese fleet severely defeated the flotilla of the Tunisia-based Barbary corsair Kaid Ali in the Tyrrhenian Sea, in view of the island of Elba. The battle broke the back of one of the rising corsair bases on the Barbary Coast, Bizerte, and established Andrea Doria as among the foremost captains in the Mediterranean.

== Background ==
Raiding had long been part of life in the Mediterranean. The last decades of the Middle Ages had seen numerous famous corsairs harassing both coastal populations and shipping activities, but the turn of the 16th century coincided with a marked surge of piracy. Most notably, several captains established bases on the North African coast where strong corsair flotillas left every year for months-long cruises. In the spring and summer, they raided and pillaged coastal regions and Mediterranean Europe's maritime trade. Among the region's most famous Barbary corsairs at the time were Hayreddin Barbarossa and Kurtoğlu Muslihiddin.

Muslihiddin set up his base of operation in the Tunisian town of Bizerte with support of the local Hafsid Dynasty. His prowess at sea attracted the Ottoman government's attention and he was offered command of the Turkish fleet in 1516. After Kurtoğlu Muslihiddin left North Africa, command in Bizerte was assumed by another captain (reis), Kaid Ali (literally Ali the Boss) who soon proved as much a scourge for the Europeans as his predecessor had been. The Bizertine flotilla had grown strong enough to be a threat not only for merchant ships and the coast villages but even for military vessels. In a battle in mid-September 1518, Kaid Ali defeated and captured the flagship galley (Capitana) of the Pope and took the papal fleet's admiral, Paolo Vettori, near Mont’Argentario, on the Tuscan coast.

For the most part, the European Christian powers were too occupied fighting each other to pay much heed to the rather small-scale predation of the Barbary corsairs. Spain, for instance, notably diminished the resources allocated to the fight against the North African raiders in the 1510s, considering French expansionism as a much greater threat to its security. Corsairs were taken seriously only by lesser coastal powers such as Genoa and the Papal States in particular because they directly menaced important trade routes upon which their economies and grain supplies depended.

In early spring 1519, aware of the arrival of Kaid Ali's flotilla in the Tyrrhenian Sea, the Genoese Republic entrusted its coastline defense to a local captain, the nobleman Andrea Doria, who had acquired a good reputation fighting in Corsica for the Republic. Mindful of the difficulty of the task at hand, Andrea Doria demanded that the Republic's four galleys be reinforced with another two. The Genoese government granted his request but, because there were too few prisoners and captives to provide the two new boats with sufficient rowers, free oarsmen were recruited (buonavoglia) to complement the rowing crew.

== Battle ==
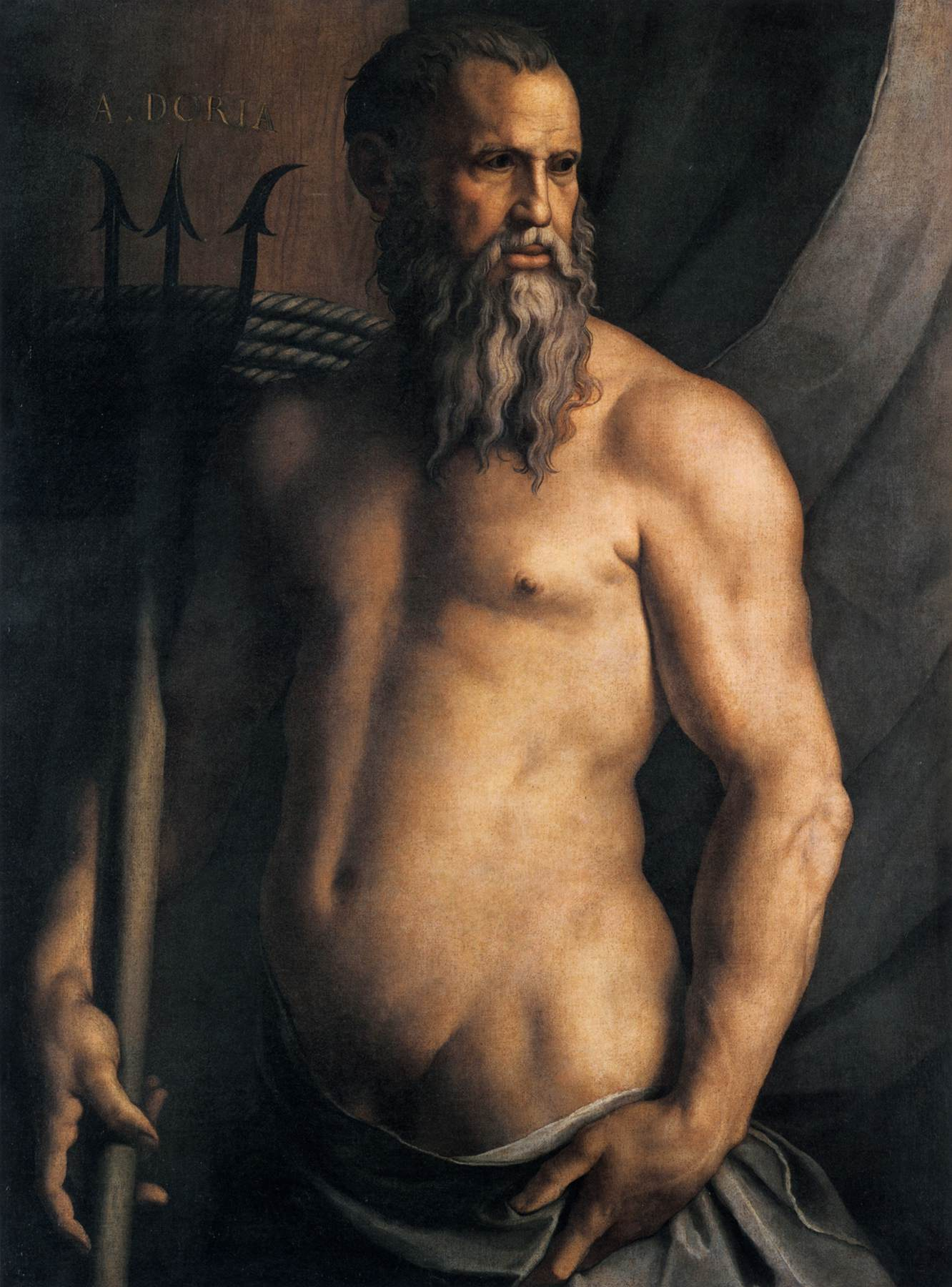
Andrea Doria as Neptune

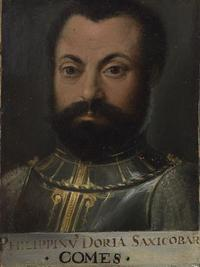
Filippino Doria

The Genoese fleet left its base mid-April and headed south into the Tyrrhenian Sea looking for corsairs. On 25 April, in the Tuscan archipelago, near the island of Pianosa, the Genoese ships met the Kaid Ali flotilla. More numerous and with the support of a favourable strong southern wind (sirocco), the Barbary corsairs were at a clear advantage. Andrea Doria had his galleys turn face and flee while the Bizertine began to pursue. The chase went on for about 20 nautical miles and probably four hours. The strong wind put the larger and more seaworthy Genoese ships at an advantage. They reached the westernmost cape of the island of Elba ahead of their pursuers.

Having reached Elba, the Genoese captain took advantage of a local wind pattern to change direction and head straight towards the Bizertines. However, the newly recruited free-rowers of the two additional ships lacked the skill and strength for these arduous maneuvers and began drifting with the wind. Andrea Doria had to send two of his older galleys to tow the less experienced ships. Two-thirds of the Genoese ships were unable to face-off and run down the adversary in time. Rather than letting the opportunity pass, Andrea Doria put his nephew Filippino Doria in charge of the four slower ships and took his main galleys, the Capitana and the Patrona, straight towards the Bizertine to pin them down before the main force arrived.

The Genoese had more artillery than the corsairs and managed to do some damage with their cannons. However the Bizertine succeeded in grappling and boarding the Genoese ships. Hand-to-hand combat ensued. Badly outnumbered, Doria and his men managed to sustain the shock for fifteen minutes. At this point the four ships under Filippino Doria reached the thick of the fight and within half-an-hour the battle was won for the Genoese. Only three fuste ships of the corsairs managed to escape. The rest of the flotilla – possibly as many as nine vessels of various sizes – were captured or sunk. The Capitana of the Pope had been recovered and was towed back to Genoa along with four other ships.

== Aftermath ==
The fight, as was often the case in the overcrowded galleys, had been extraordinarily violent and bloody. Italian sources mention 500 corsairs dead. This may be an overestimate, but the losses on the side of the Bizertines were undoubtedly heavy. The Genoese had also suffered important casualties. One of Andrea Doria's nephews, Lazzarino Doria, was killed in action and his second-in-command Filippino Doria was wounded twice. The Genoese managed to take only a handful of prisoners among whom, however, was the Bizertine captain Kaid Ali. Most of these captives were rapidly ransomed but Kaid Ali himself was not exchanged and was held as a prisoner in the fortress of Pianosa until his death in 1530.

With Kaid Ali prisoner and Kurtoğlu Muslihiddin serving the Ottomans in the East, the bulk of their men dead and most of their ships captured or sunk, the strength of the Bizertine corsair base had been broken and the city receded into a very secondary raiding base, far behind the main corsair ports Tripoli and, above all, Algiers.

== Bibliography ==
- Bono, Salvatore (1964). I corsari barbareschi. Rome: ERI-Edizion RAI Radiotelevisione Italiana.
- Braudel, Fernand (1995). The Mediterranean and the Mediterranean World in the Age of Philip II, Volume 1. Berkeley, CA: University of California Press. ISBN 9780520203082.
- Campodonico, Pierangelo (1997). Andrea Doria. Genoa: Tormena Editore.
- Cavanna Ciappina, Maristella (1982). "Doria, Filippo". Dizionario Biografico degli Italiani - Volume 41.
- Espinosa, Aurelio (2005). "The Grand Strategy of Charles V (1500-1558): Castile, War, and Dynastic Priority in the Mediterranean". Journal of Early Modern History. 9 (3): 239–283. doi:10.1163/157006505775008446.
- Graziani, Antoine-Marie (1991). "Domaines coloniaux, industrie sécuritaire et système fiscal en Corse à la fin du XVIe siècle". Mélanges de l'École française de Rome: Italie et Méditerranée. 103 (2): 461–520. doi:10.3406/mefr.1991.4168.
- Graziani, Antoine-Marie (2008). Andrea Doria: Un Prince de la Renaissance. Paris: Tallandier.
- Grendi, Edoardo (2005). "Genova alla meta del Cinquecento: una politica del grano?". Journal of Early Modern History. 5 (13): 106–160. JSTOR 43900349.
- Guglielmotti, Alberto (1876). Storia della marina Pontificia dal secolo ottavo al decimonono, Volume 3, Issue 1. Rome: Tipografia Tiberina.
- Lo Basso, Luca (2007). "Gli asentisti del re. L'esercizio privato della guerra nelle strategie economiche dei Genovesi (1528-1716)" (PDF). R. Cancila. Mediterraneo in Armi. Mediterranea. Palermo: 2712–81.
- Pacini, Arturo (1999). La Genova di Andrea Doria nell'impero di Carlo V. Florence: Olschki.* Valérian, Dominique (2006). Bougie, port maghrébin, 1067-1510. Rome: École Française de Rome.
- Zachariadou, Elisavet A., ed. (2002). The Kapudan Pasha : his office and his domain : Halcyon Days in Crete IV, a symposium held in Rethymnon, 7-9 January 2000. Rethymnon: Crete University Press.
- Williams, Phillip (2015). Empire and Holy War in the Mediterranean: The Galley and Maritime Conflict Between the Habsburgs and Ottomans. New York City: I. B. Tauris. ISBN 9781784533755.
