= The Lost King (novel) =

1937 novel

- Author: Rafael Sabatini
- Language: English
- Genre: Historical
- Publisher: Hutchinson; Houghton Mifflin (US)
- Publication date: 1937
- Publication place: United Kingdom
- Media type: Print

The Lost King is a 1937 historical novel by the British-Italian author Rafael Sabatini. It is one of several novels based around the idea that the ten-year old Louis XVII, the son and heir to the guillotined Louis XVI, did not die in Temple Prison in 1795 but instead escaped into exile. It features the Royalist spymaster Baron de Batz. In 1958 the novel was adapted into a BBC television series of the same title which starred Barry Letts, Alan Dobie and Patrick Cargill.

== Bibliography ==
- Henderson, Lesley & Kirkpatrick, Lesley D. L. Twentieth-century Romance and Historical Writers. St. James Press, 1990
- Hoppenstand, Gary. Perilous Escapades: Dimensions of Popular Adventure Fiction. McFarland, 2018.
