= Jean-Paul de Rome d'Ardène =

- Born: 25 January 1690; Mane, Provence, France
- Died: 5 December 1769 (aged 79); Saint-Michel-l'Observatoire, France
- Occupations: Botanist; Agronomist; Priest

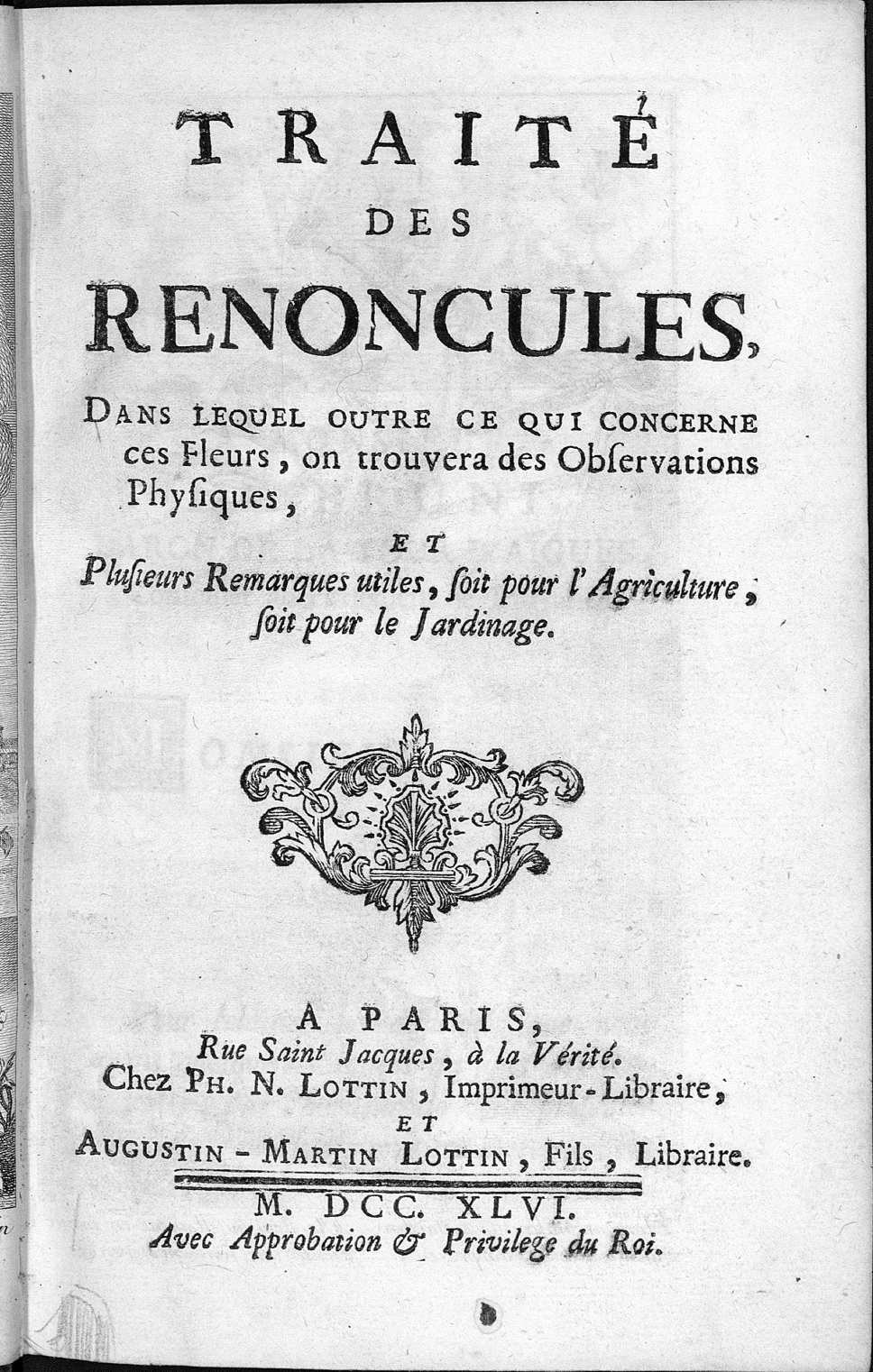
Traité des Renoncules, 1746

Father Jean-Paul de Rome d'Ardène (25 January 1690 – 5 December 1769) in domaine d'Ardène in Saint-Michel (modern Saint-Michel-l'Observatoire, Alpes-de-Haute-Provence) was an 18th-century French botanist.

== Origins ==
Jean-Paul de Rome d'Ardène was the son of Honoré de Rome sieur d’Ardène, commissaire des galères et inspecteur des bois et forêts de Provence who had the Château d’Ardène built in 1686 and Antoinette Leroy, daughter of Jean Leroy, conseiller du Roi et contrôleur général de la marine du Levant et des galères de France. His elder brother, Esprit-Jean de Rome d'Ardène (1684-1748) was a well known writer and fabulist.

== Life ==
An adolescent, Jean-Paul de Rome d'Ardène studied rhetoric and philosophy at the Marseille College, then was admitted to the Oratory of Aix en Provence in 1708. In Arles he studied theology before teaching humanities in Marseille. Frail, he was quickly relieved of his duties and in 1714, was allowed to retire and return to live on the lands of his family, in Ardène. Always a member of the Oratory of Aix while remaining in Ardène, he was ordained priest in 1718. He then devoted himself to botany and would write many books on growing flowers (Traité des renoncules (1746), Traité des jacinthes (1759), ...) which would experience great success with his contemporaries. In addition, making his entourage benefit of his knowledge of medicinal plants and passionate about their study, he published the Lettres sur l’exercice de la médecine in 1759.

== Works ==
- Traité des Renoncules (in French). Paris: Philippe Nicolas Lottin & Augustin Martin Lottin. 1746.
- 1759: Lettres sur l’exercice de la médecine
- 1759: Traité des jacinthes
- Traité des tulipes (in French). Avignon: Jean-Louis Chambeau. 1760.
- 1762: Traité des œillets
- 1767: Abrégés de jardinage
- 1767: Œuvres posthumes de Monsieur d'Ardene, associé a l'académie des Belles-Lettres de Marseille: œuvres posthumes d'Esprit-Jean de Rome d'Ardène, collected, compiled and published by his brother.
- 1769: l’Année Champêtre.

== Bibliography ==
- Jacques Billoud, Un agronome provençal du XVIIIe siècle : le Père Rome d'Ardène, (p. 331-340), in Provence historique, fascicule 54, tome 13, 1963 read online
- Charles Bourgeois, Le Père J.-P. de Rome d'Ardène, botaniste et agronome provençal (1690-1769). I, La vie, (p. 463-472), in Revue d'histoire de la pharmacie, 1969, Volume 57, n°203 read online
- Charles Bourgeois, Le Père J.-P. de Rome d'Ardène, botaniste et agronome provençal (1690-1769) (suite). II. L'œuvre, (p. 21-38), dans Revue d'histoire de la pharmacie, 1970, Volume 58, n°204 read online
