= Bardelys the Magnificent =

1926 American silent romantic film

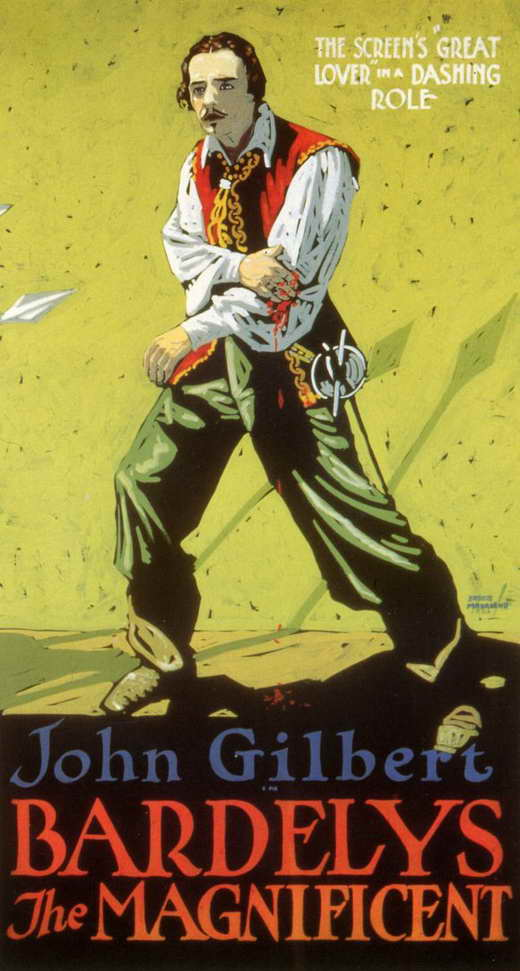
- Theatrical release poster
- Directed by: King Vidor
- Written by: Dorothy Farnum; Marian Ainslee (titles)
- Based on: Bardelys the Magnificent; 1905 novel by Rafael Sabatini
- Starring: John Gilbert; Eleanor Boardman; Roy D'Arcy; Karl Dane
- Cinematography: William H. Daniels
- Music by: William Axt
- Distributed by: Metro-Goldwyn-Mayer
- Release date: September 30, 1926
- Running time: 90 minutes
- Country: United States
- Language: Silent (English intertitles)
- Budget: $460,000
- Box office: $962,000

Full movie

Bardelys the Magnificent is a 1926 American silent romantic film directed by King Vidor and starring John Gilbert and Eleanor Boardman. The film is based on the 1906 novel of the same title by Rafael Sabatini. It was the second film of the 19-year-old John Wayne, who had a minor role.

The film's sets were designed by the art director James Basevi.

== Plot ==
The film is set in the reign of King Louis XIII. When Comte Châtellerault fails to win the hand in marriage of Roxalanne de Lavedan, despite hinting at leniency for her rebellious family if she accepts, he responds to the notorious womanizer Marquis de Bardelys' mockery by wagering his estate against that of Bardelys that Bardelys cannot succeed in marrying Roxalanne either within three months. While Bardelys does not desire marriage, he feels he has to accept the challenge. However the king, on hearing of the wager, forbids Bardelys from seeking a marriage alliance with a rebel family.

Bardelys ignores the king’s orders as he feels that his honour is at stake. On the way to the Lavedan estate, he stumbles upon a fatally wounded man, Lesperon, who asks him to say farewell to his beloved but dies before telling him her name. Bardelys takes his papers and, when challenged by a party of the king’s soldiers, assumes Lesperon’s identity to conceal his own, only to find that Lesperon is a wanted traitor. Bardelys escapes after fighting them off, and wounded, seeks refuge in the Lavedan residence. Roxalanne tends to him and hides him. Meanwhile, Roxalanne and her family discover with anger that she is the subject of a public wager by Bardelys, who prudently retains his assumed identity and grows closer to Roxalanne.

They declare their love for one another but she discovers that Lesperon was engaged and, furious at what she thinks are his false protestations of love, denounces Bardelys to soldiers. Bardelys, under the identity of Lesperon, is tried for treason. Châtellerault, who is the head judge, maliciously refuses to confirm his true identity and condemns him to death.

Roxalanne—in despair—marries Châtellerault on his promise to remit the death sentence, but he lies claiming that Bardelys has already been executed. Bardelys, on the gallows, delays his execution until the king arrives and saves him. Bardelys goes to Châtellerault and forfeits the wager and his estate so he can propose to Roxalanne with a clear conscience. The two men fight and Bardelys repeatedly wins, when soldiers enter to arrest Châtellerault upon which he kills himself rather than suffer the indignity of a trial. The king enters to laud Bardelys’ skill with women to Roxalanne’s annoyance but she is mollified when the king says that this is the first time Bardelys has sought to marry.

== Cast ==
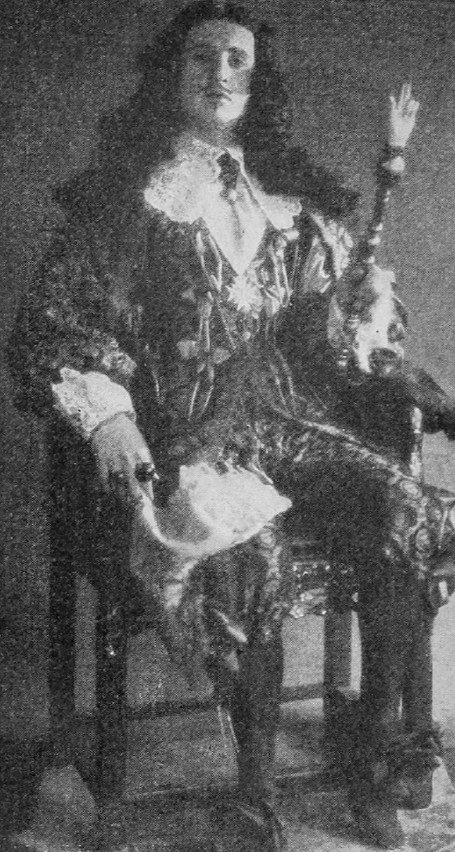
Arthur Lubin as King Louis XIII

- John Gilbert as Marquis Bardelys
- Eleanor Boardman as Roxalanne de Lavedan
- Roy D'Arcy as Comte Châtellerault
- Lionel Belmore as Vicomte de Lavedan
- Emily Fitzroy as Vicomtesse de Lavedan
- George K. Arthur as Sainte-Eustache
- Arthur Lubin as King Louis XIII
- Theodore von Eltz as Lesperon
- Karl Dane as Rodenard
- Edward Connelly as Cardinal Richelieu
- Fred Malatesta as Castelrous
- John T. Murray as Lafosse
- Joe Smith Marba as Innkeeper (as Joseph Marba)
- Daniel G. Tomlinson as Sergeant of Dragoons
- Emile Chautard as Anatol
- John Wayne as Guard (uncredited)

== Preservation ==
Bardelys the Magnificent was considered to be a lost film for many years, with only the trailer and a brief excerpt in Vidor's Show People (1928) surviving. According to Robert Osborne on Turner Classic Movies, MGM signed a contract with Sabatini in 1926, giving MGM the rights to his novel for 10 years. In 1936, MGM chose not to renew the rights, and destroyed the negative and all known prints per the terms of the contract.

In 2006, a nearly complete print of the film was found in France, missing only reel three. It was restored, using production stills and footage from the film trailer to stand in for the missing section, and made available in 2008 for U.S. theatrical and DVD release. In February 2020, the film was shown at the 70th Berlin International Film Festival, as part of a retrospective dedicated to King Vidor's career.
