= Scaramouche (novel) =

1921 novel by Rafael Sabatini

Title page of an early edition

Scaramouche is a historical novel by Rafael Sabatini, originally published in 1921. A romantic adventure, Scaramouche tells the story of a young lawyer during the French Revolution. In the course of his adventures, he becomes an actor portraying Scaramouche (a roguish buffoon character in the commedia dell'arte). He also becomes a revolutionary, politician, and fencing-master, confounding his enemies with his powerful orations and swordsmanship. He is forced by circumstances to change sides several times. The book also depicts his transformation from cynic to idealist.

The three-part novel opens with the line: "He was born with a gift of laughter and a sense that the world was mad." This line is Sabatini's epitaph, inscribed on his gravestone in Adelboden, Switzerland. It is also inscribed on an archway in the entrance of the Humanities Quadrangle at Yale University.

== Plot ==
=== The Robe ===
Andre-Louis Moreau, educated as a lawyer, lives in the village of Gavrillac in Brittany with his godfather, Quentin de Kercadiou, the Lord of Gavrillac, who refuses to disclose Moreau's parentage. Moreau has grown up alongside Aline, de Kercadiou's niece, and their relationship is that of cousins. Because he loves her as a cousin, he warns her against marrying the Marquis de la Tour d'Azyr; however, she is ambitious and wishes to marry high, so she ignores him. A peasant, Mabey, is shot for poaching by the gamekeeper of the Marquis de la Tour d'Azyr, on the Marquis's instructions. The idealistic Philippe de Vilmorin, a seminarian and Moreau's closest friend, denounces the act as murder. While pleading with the Marquis for justice, de Vilmorin is provoked into duelling with the Marquis and is killed for his "gift of eloquence", which the Marquis fears will set the common people against the clergy and nobility.

Moreau vows to avenge the death by undertaking Vilmorin's work, even though Moreau himself does not believe in the cause. He sets off from Gavrillac for Rennes, expecting that the King's lieutenant in Brittany will see justice done. After being brushed off by the arrogant official, who refuses to act against a man of the Marquis' status, Moreau discovers a large political gathering where one of the speakers against the nobility's excesses has been assassinated. Much to the surprise of his peers, who think he is on the side of the aristocracy, Moreau uses de Vilmorin's arguments to deliver a speech with inspiring rhetoric. Moreau goes on to Nantes and, using the name "Omnes Omnibus", whips up the crowds there. These events set the stage for the French Revolution and make Moreau a wanted man.

=== The Buskin ===
To hide from the law, Moreau joins a troupe of traveling commedia dell'arte actors, led by M. Binet. He takes on the role of Scaramouche, the scheming rogue. He discovers an aptitude for acting and writing that propels the troupe from near-poverty to success and the Feydau theater in Nantes. Binet, who plays "Pantaloon", grows ever more resentful of Moreau and his influence in the troupe. Moreau becomes engaged to Binet's daughter, Climene, but after Andre-Louis reveals that he is not of noble birth, she (to her father's delight) accepts a proposition from the Marquis de la Tour d'Azyr and becomes his mistress.

Aline learns of the affair and, furious with the Marquis for carrying on with Climene while he is supposed to be wooing her, Aline breaks off relations with him. The Marquis, now notorious for brutally quelling an uprising in Rennes, is lying low in Nantes. When he attends a performance, Moreau reveals his presence to the audience and sparks a riot. When Binet, furious at being ruined, attacks Moreau, Moreau shoots him in self-defense. Binet is wounded, and Moreau escapes. It is later revealed that, during Binet's recovery, his entire troupe deserted him and actually thrived without him; he and his daughter (who was "dumped" by the Marquis following the riot) are both completely ruined.

=== The Sword ===
Moreau is now forced to go into hiding. Arriving in Paris, he finds a fencing academy seeking "a young man of good address with some knowledge of swordsmanship". Moreau manages to convince M. Bertrand des Amis, the Maître en fait d'Armes (master at arms), to hire him. Eventually, des Amis sees that Andre-Louis shows promise as a swordsman and makes him his apprentice. Over time, Andre-Louis develops his own style of fencing, based on calculations of different moves, and the school begins to prosper. With the outbreak of the French Revolution, M. des Amis is killed in a street riot, and Moreau inherits the school. When he is established at the now-thriving school, he reconciles with his godfather, thanks to Aline and Mme. de Plougastel. Mme. de Plougastel is a relative of his godfather; Moreau has seen her only once in his life, but she takes an almost maternal interest in him.

The reconciliation is brief, however. After learning of his swordsmanship, Moreau's friends convince him to take a seat in the Estates General of 1789. They face the scourge of spadassinicides, aristocratic senators who provoke inexperienced Republicans to fight duels and wound or kill them, just as the Marquis did to de Vilmorin. Indeed, de La Tour d'Azyr is the chief spadassinicide. Andre-Louis turns the tables and succeeds in killing or seriously wounding all who challenge him. Finally, Moreau manages to goad the Marquis into challenging him to a duel; at last, he can confront the murderer of his childhood friend, de Vilmorin. Hearing of this, Mme. de Plougastel and Aline hasten to stop the duel. They do not arrive in time, and they see the Marquis leaving the field, wounded, but not fatally. Andre-Louis becomes a full-time member of the National Assembly, and the Marquis becomes a counter-revolutionary.

In 1792, Paris is up in arms and the Tuileries are stormed by a mob. Mme. de Plougastel and Aline are there and in grave danger because the former's husband is a counter-revolutionary. Returning from an errand in Brittany, Moreau learns that his godfather needs travel permits to allow these two women to leave Paris, and he travels to Gavrillac to visit de Kercadiou. De Kercadiou tells him of the plight of Aline and Mme. de Plougastel in Paris. Moreau agrees to rescue Aline, but does not agree to help Mme. de Plougastel until Kercadiou reveals to Andre-Louis that Mme. de Plougastel is his mother. Moreau secures the needed travel permits and leaves to deliver them to the women.

However, before he arrives, de La Tour d'Azyr, on the run from the mob, seeks shelter in the same apartment as the women. He and Andre-Louis draw pistols on each other. Mme. de Plougastel is forced to reveal that the Marquis is Moreau's father. Andre-Louis refuses to reconcile with the Marquis but decides to end the feud with him and gives him one of the travel permits. De La Tour d'Azyr crosses safely to Austria and enters the service of the Emperor of Austria.

Moreau knows that he cannot remain in Paris, or even in France, because of his recent actions. He decides to cross the border with the women and his godfather. After safely escaping from Paris and returning to relative safety in Gavrillac, Andre-Louis and Aline unravel their misconceptions about their feelings for each other and declare their love.

== Scaramouche the Kingmaker ==
A decade later, Sabatini wrote a sequel titled Scaramouche the Kingmaker that was not as well received, but earned commercial success, appearing on the very first The New York Times bestseller list. It was Sabatini's first attempt at a series.

The book continues the adventures of Andre-Louis Moreau, beginning where the original Scaramouche ends. Moreau conceives and then masterminds, with the Baron de Batz, a plan to destroy the Revolution and restore the monarchy. Their plan is to expose the Revolutionary leaders—hitherto thought of by the French populace as incorruptible patriots—as corrupt profiteers. While Andre-Louis is in France, working for the restoration, in Germany, the Regent of France attempts to seduce Andre-Louis's fiancée, Aline de Kercadiou.

== Adaptations ==
Scaramouche was adapted into several works:

- A play by Barbara Field
- A feature film, Scaramouche (1923), starring Ramon Novarro as Moreau and Lewis Stone as the Marquis de la Tour d'Azyr
- A tradaptation (translated adaptation), Rohini (රෝහිණී) (1929), a novel in Sinhala by Martin Wickremasinghe
- A remake, Scaramouche (1952) with Stewart Granger, which includes one of the longest swashbuckling sword-fighting scenes ever filmed. Lewis Stone appears as Georges de Valmorin

The ballet by Poul Knudsen with music by Jean Sibelius is not related to the Sabatini novel. Also, Darius Milhaud's 1937 orchestral suite Scaramouche was not based on the novel.

== Modern references ==
- The band Queen's song "Bohemian Rhapsody" includes the lyric "Scaramouche, Scaramouche, will you do the fandango?"
- The protagonist of Robert Asprin's novel Phule's Company, Willard Phule, originally chooses Scaramouche as his call sign, partially in recognition of his fencing skill.
