= The Gamester (novel) =

1944 novel

- First edition
- Author: Rafael Sabatini
- Language: English
- Genre: Historical
- Publisher: Hutchinson; Houghton Mifflin (US)
- Publication date: 1949
- Publication place: United Kingdom
- Media type: Print

The Gamester is a 1949 historical adventure novel by the Italian-born British writer Rafael Sabatini. It was his final published novel before his death the following year. The plot revolves around the life of the Scottish financier John Law who created a large boom in France during the early eighteenth century.

== Bibliography ==
- Hoppenstand, Gary. Perilous Escapades: Dimensions of Popular Adventure Fiction. McFarland, 2018.
- Orel, Harold. The Historical Novel from Scott to Sabatini: Changing Attitudes toward a Literary Genre, 1814–1920. Springer, 1995.
