= Captain Blood (1935 film) =

1935 film by Michael Curtiz

- Theatrical release poster
- Directed by: Michael Curtiz
- Screenplay by: Casey Robinson
- Based on: Captain Blood (1922 novel) by Rafael Sabatini
- Produced by: Harry Joe Brown; Gordon Hollingshead
- Starring: Errol Flynn; Olivia de Havilland; Lionel Atwill; Basil Rathbone
- Cinematography: Ernest Haller; Hal Mohr
- Edited by: George Amy
- Music by: Erich Wolfgang Korngold
- Production company: Cosmopolitan Productions
- Distributed by: Warner Bros. Pictures, Inc.
- Release dates: December 26, 1935 (New York City); December 28, 1935 (U.S.)
- Running time: 119 minutes
- Country: United States
- Language: English
- Budget: $1.242 million or $995,000
- Box office: $3.09 million (worldwide rentals)

Captain Blood is a 1935 American swashbuckler film directed by Michael Curtiz for First National Pictures and Warner Bros. Pictures, and starring Errol Flynn, Olivia de Havilland, Lionel Atwill and Basil Rathbone. With a screenplay by Casey Robinson, the film is based on the 1922 novel by Rafael Sabatini and concerns an imprisoned doctor and his fellow prisoners who escape their cruel island captivity to become West Indies pirates.

Warner Bros. risked pairing two relatively unknown performers in the lead roles. Flynn's performance made him a major Hollywood star and established him as the natural successor to Douglas Fairbanks and a "symbol of an unvanquished man" during the Great Depression. Captain Blood also established de Havilland, in just her fourth screen appearance, as a major star and was the first of eight films costarring Flynn and de Havilland. The Oscar-nominated score by Erich Wolfgang Korngold started a trend for full-length symphonic scores.

The film premiered on December 26, 1935, and was both a critical and commercial success. At the 8th Academy Awards, Captain Blood was nominated for Best Picture and received write-in nominations for Best Director, Best Screenplay and Best Score. In 1962, Flynn's son Sean starred in The Son of Captain Blood.

== Plot ==
In England in 1685, Irish doctor Peter Blood is summoned to aid Lord Gildoy, a wounded patron who participated in the Monmouth Rebellion. Arrested while performing his duties as a physician, he is convicted of treason against King James II and sentenced to death by the infamous Judge Jeffreys. By the whim of the king, upon his advisor Lord Sunderland's counsel, Blood and the surviving rebels are transported to the West Indies to be sold into slavery.

In Port Royal, Blood is bought by Arabella Bishop, the beautiful niece of local military commander Colonel Bishop. Attracted by Blood's rebellious nature, Arabella tries to improve his situation by recommending him as the physician to the colony's governor, Steed, who continually suffers from painful gout. Outwardly resentful toward Arabella, yet silently appreciative for her efforts on his behalf, Blood develops an escape plan for himself and his fellow prisoners. The plan is almost uncovered by the suspicious Colonel Bishop, who has one of Blood's men, Jeremy Pitt, flogged and interrogated. Blood is spared a similar fate when a Spanish man-o'-war attacks Port Royal. During the raid, Blood and his fellow prisoners seize the Spanish ship from its drunken night watch and sail away to begin lives of piracy in 1687.

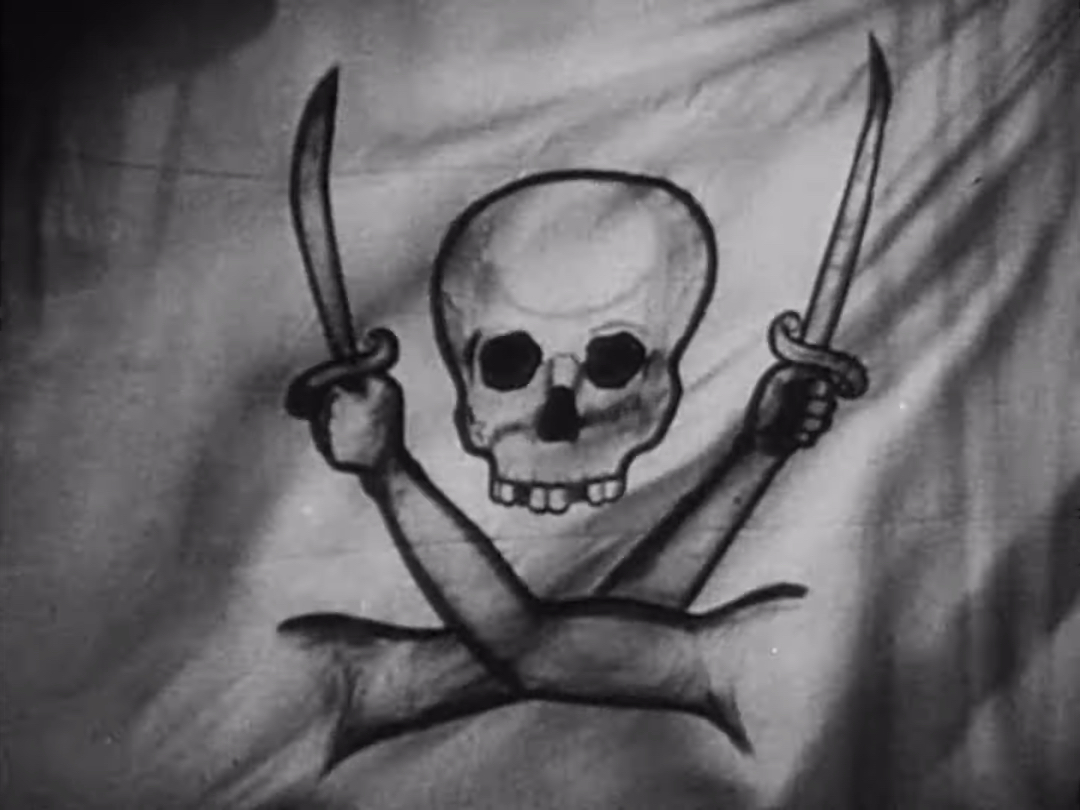
Captain Blood's Crossed Swords Jolly Roger

Captain Blood's crew quickly achieve great fame among the buccaneers of the Brotherhood of the Coast, with Blood himself deemed the greatest captain of the coast. When Governor Steed is unable to contain the pirate menace, Colonel Bishop is appointed governor. He sends Arabella to England on an extended holiday, but three years later, she returns to the Caribbean. Her ship, also carrying royal emissary Lord Willoughby, is captured by Blood's treacherous partner, the French buccaneer Captain Levasseur, who plans to hold them for ransom. Blood forces Levasseur to sell them to him, relishing the opportunity to turn the tables on Arabella. When Levasseur vehemently objects, despite having accepted Blood's payment, the two pirate captains duel, with Blood killing Levasseur. Blood offers Arabella valuable jewelry from his conquests as a sign of his love for her. Ungrateful for her "rescue," Arabella is indignant at having been purchased by Blood and calls him a thief and a pirate. Although angered by her rejection, he orders his men to set sail for Port Royal, where he will deliver Arabella and Lord Willoughby, despite the danger to himself and his crew.

As they approach Port Royal, they sight two French warships attacking the city; Bishop has left it undefended in his single-minded pursuit of Blood. With England now at war with France, Lord Willoughby pleads with Blood to save the colony, but the captain and his crew refuse to fight for the corrupt king. Willoughby reveals that James was kicked out of England and fled to France and is in hiding; England's new king, William III, has sent Willoughby to offer Blood and his men full pardons and commissions in the Royal Navy. This startling news quickly changes the pirates' minds, and they prepare for battle with the French.

After having had Arabella ferried ashore, Blood and his men approach Port Royal flying French colors, but soon that ensign is replaced with the British Union Jack. A pitched ship-to-ship battle ensues, leading to frenzied hand-to-hand deck combat. Blood and his men defeat the French frigates, saving the colony, but not before losing their ship in the battle. As a reward for his daring action, Blood is appointed the new governor of Port Royal by Lord Willoughby, after which Arabella confesses that she loves him. Blood also has the pleasure of dealing with his hostile predecessor, having now returned from his pirate hunt and under arrest for abandoning his post in a time of war. As Arabella playfully pleads with the new governor to spare her uncle's life, Blood finally reveals his face to the astonished Bishop, greeting him with the phrase "Good morning, Uncle".

== Cast ==
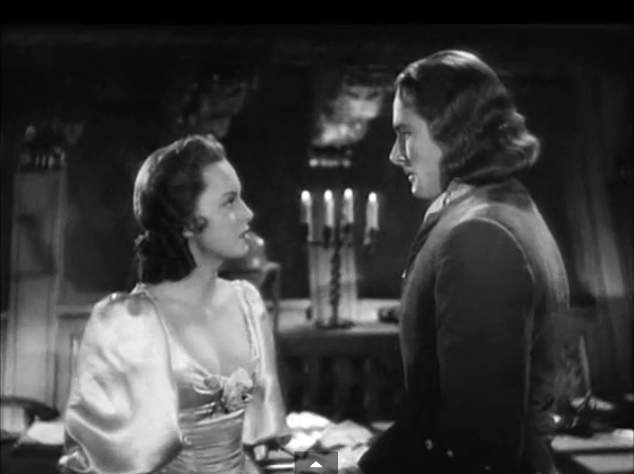
De Havilland and Flynn in Captain Blood

- Errol Flynn as Peter Blood
- Olivia de Havilland as Arabella Bishop
- Lionel Atwill as Colonel Bishop
- Basil Rathbone as Levasseur
- Ross Alexander as Jeremy Pitt, Blood's friend and navigator
- Guy Kibbee as Henry Hagthorpe, Master Gunner
- Henry Stephenson as Lord Willoughby
- Robert Barrat as John Wolverstone
- Hobart Cavanaugh as Dr. Bronson
- Donald Meek as Dr. Whacker
- Jessie Ralph as Mrs. Barlow
- Forrester Harvey as Honesty Nuttall
- Frank McGlynn Sr. as Rev. Uriah Ogle
- Holmes Herbert as Capt. Gardner
- David Torrence as Andrew Baynes
- J. Carrol Naish as Cahusac
- Pedro de Cordoba as Don Diego
- George Hassell as Governor Steed
- Harry Cording as Kent
- Leonard Mudie as Baron Jeffreys
- Ivan Simpson as The Prosecutor
- Stuart Casey as Capt. Hobart
- Dennis D. Auburn as Lord Gildoy
- Mary Forbes as Mrs. Steed
- E. E. Clive as Clerk of the Court
- Colin Kenny as Lord Chester Dyke
- Maude Leslie as Mrs. Baynes
- Vernon Steele as James II
- Gardner James as Slave

Uncredited

- Halliwell Hobbes as Lord Sunderland
- Reginald Barlow as Dixon
- John Carradine as Spanish Pirate
- Murray Kinnell as Court Clerk
- Georges Renavent as French Captain
- Alphonse Martell and Frank Puglia as French Officers

== Production ==
An earlier 1924 Vitagraph silent film version of Captain Blood starred J. Warren Kerrigan as the title character. Warner Bros. was inspired to remake the film, after the popularity of Treasure Island (1934) and The Count of Monte Cristo (1934) revived the Hollywood swashbuckler genre.

=== Writing ===
The job of writing the script was given to Casey Robinson who recalled that they stuck close to the novel's historical background but they humanized the movie more:

We got inside the character of a young man who was a doctor in England, who was unjustly accused of conspiring against the throne, and who went into virtual slavery with a great feeling of the injustice done to him This led immediately to the theme of man's injustice to man, because Morgan was not alone; he was with a lot of others who were transported to the Indies. And that theme, which was completely absent from the Sabatini novel, contributed greatly, I would say, to the success of the film. We humanized all the characters. Sabatini drew historical characters that, if they had been translated directly to the screen, would have been merely wooden figures, puppets moving in costume. This is the great danger in making costume pictures; this is the thing that has to be avoided. Part of this also involved humanizing the character played by Olivia de Havilland to make her more identificiable, her father and adding two comic doctors.

=== Casting ===
The lead role was originally offered to Robert Donat, who had starred in the successful 1934 film The Count of Monte Cristo. The asthmatic Donat turned down the role, concerned that the action sequences would be too strenuous for him. A series of screen tests with various actors led to Flynn, an unknown Australian actor. In January 1935, Warner Bros. signed Flynn and brought him to Hollywood after seeing him in the British B picture Murder at Monte Carlo. For the female lead role, Jean Muir was originally chosen to play opposite Donat, but after Muir declined the role, the studio focused on the 19-year-old de Havilland, who had starred in three previous films that same year, including A Midsummer Night's Dream for director Max Reinhardt.

=== Filming ===
The film's production budget was US$1,242,000 (equivalent to $29,165,898 in 2025).

Most of the film was shot on a sound stage in the summer of 1935. Some exterior scenes, such as the sword fight between Rathbone and Flynn on a Caribbean shore, were shot at Laguna Beach, California. The final battle sequence between Blood's pirate crew and the French ships employed one of the largest technical crews assembled for a film, requiring 2,500 extras.

During filming, Flynn collapsed from a bout of malaria that he had contracted in New Guinea.

Some of the film's sea-battle footage was taken from the silent film The Sea Hawk (1924).

=== Music ===
Captain Blood features a stirring and romantic musical score, the first of its type for a sound film, by Austrian composer Erich Wolfgang Korngold. In 1935, Warner Bros. asked Korngold to score the film, but he declined, feeling that a story about pirates was outside his range of interest. However, Korngold changed his mind after watching the filming.

"Korngold not only had the background but also had the gift of melody, an innate sense of theater, and the skills to manipulate sentiment, emotion, humor, and excitement. In short, if Jack L. Warner had been praying for such a composer, then his prayers had been answered". —Film historian, Tony Thomas

Korngold was required to compose more than an hour of symphonic music in only three weeks. The short time frame forced him to borrow portions of symphonic poems by Franz Liszt, which constituted approximately ten percent of the score. As such, Korngold was unwilling to take credit for the entire film score, insisting instead that his credit be for "musical arrangement" only.

Captain Blood became an immediate hit, with an Oscar nomination for the score. As Korngold's first fully symphonic film score, it marked a milestone in his career, as he became the first composer of international stature to sign a contract with a film studio. It also launched Flynn's film career and gave a major boost to that of de Havilland, who would appear in another seven features with Flynn. Korngold would score six more starring Flynn. The film also opened the way for other costumed, romantic film adventures, which had not been seen since the silent era.

== Release ==
Captain Blood premiered on December 26, 1935, at the Mark Strand Theatre in New York City and was released in the United States on December 28, 1935.

=== Home media ===
Long available on VHS and DVD, The Criterion Collection was set to release the film in Ultra HD Blu-ray and the high-definition Blu-ray for the first time on January 20, 2026.

== Reception ==
=== Box office ===
The film was a box-office success, earning Warner Bros. a profit of $1.462 million. According to Warner Bros., it earned $1.357 million domestically and $1.733 million overseas.

=== Critical response ===
Captain Blood received positive reviews and notices and wide public approval. However, Variety's review cited weaknesses in the storyline:

'Blood' is a spectacular cinematic entry, which, while not flawless, is quite compelling. Its sundry little discrepancies, however, count against a more satisfying final tally. The inconsistencies, while not frequent, are rather prominent and at times irritating.

As, for instance, the climactic sea battle of the lone pirate ship (Blood's), now a volunteer in the cause of England, against the two French vessels. One French frigate stands idly by until Blood's corsair conquers one and then directs his attack on the other. The finale with the discomfited governor, in whose place Blood is appointed, is rather tent-twent-thirt [excessively melodramatic].

And underlying it all, as a productionary shortcoming, is the false premise of the titular Capt. Blood. Here is a gallant, engaging young blade who, under pirate's colors, repels the very aspects which first cement his brave appeal.

Despite also finding flaws in the "scripting" of Captain Blood and in the presentation of some battle sequences, Variety called Flynn's performance "impressive" and predicted that his work in the film would provide him with "future big marquee values."

Writing for The Spectator in 1936, Graham Greene offered a tepid review, describing the film as his favorite of those that he had reviewed that week but describing it as "a fine spirited mix-up" and noting the "magnificently wrong characterization" of King James. Greene also wrote that much of the film included anachronistic details related to clothing and setting.

FilmInk magazine later wrote: "Flynn was lucky—not just in being at the right place at the right time with the right lack of competition, but with his collaborators on Captain Blood."

=== Awards and honors ===
The film was nominated for the Academy Award for Best Picture and, despite not being nominated, Michael Curtiz received the second-highest number of votes for Best Director as a write-in candidate. Erich Wolfgang Korngold and Casey Robinson, also unnominated, received substantially more write-in votes than did most of the official nominees. The film was also write-in nominated in the categories Music (Scoring), Sound Recording and Writing (Screenplay).

Captain Blood has been recognized by the American Film Institute in these lists:

- 2001: AFI's 100 Years...100 Thrills – Nominated
- 2003: AFI's 100 Years...100 Heroes & Villains:
  - Peter Blood – Nominated Hero
- 2005: AFI's 100 Years of Film Scores – Nominated

== Radio adaptation ==
Captain Blood was adapted as a radio play on the February 22, 1937 broadcast of Lux Radio Theater with Flynn, de Havilland and Rathbone reprising their film parts. The radio version is included among the special features of the 2005 DVD version.

== Cultural references ==
A clip of the film was used in the 1985 film The Goonies.

== Bibliography ==
- Greenberg, Joel (1986). "Casey Robinson: master adaptor". Backstory : interviews with screenwriters of Hollywood's golden age. University of California. p. 290-310.
- Thomas, Tony (1969). The Complete Films of Errol Flynn. New York: Citadel Press. ISBN 978-0806502373.
- Thomas, Tony (1983). The Films of Olivia de Havilland. New York: Citadel Press. ISBN 978-0806509884.
