= The Sea Hawk (1924 film) =

1924 film by Frank Lloyd

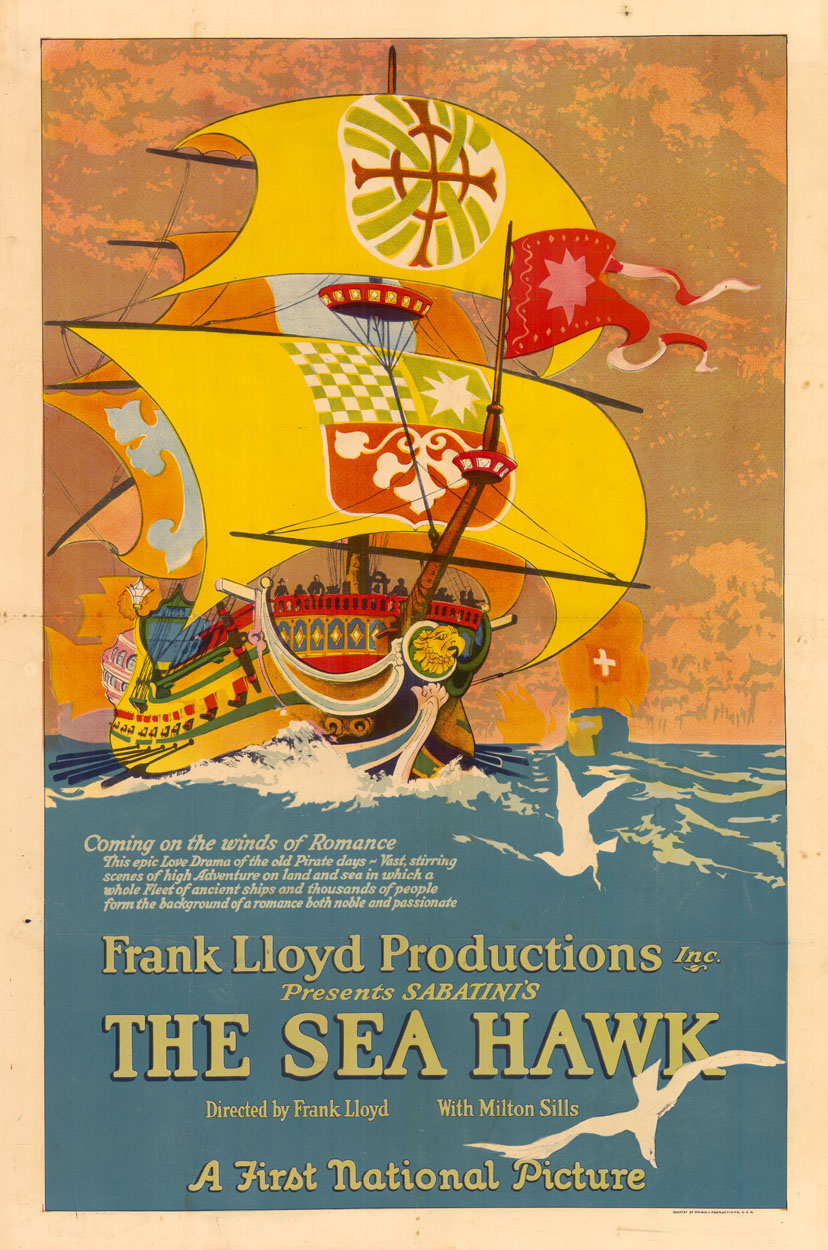
- 1924 theatrical poster
- Directed by: Frank Lloyd
- Screenplay by: J. G. Hawks; Intertitles: Walter Anthony
- Based on: The Sea Hawk; 1915 novel by Rafael Sabatini
- Produced by: Frank Lloyd
- Starring: Milton Sills; Enid Bennett; Lloyd Hughes; Wallace MacDonald; Marc McDermott; Wallace Beery
- Cinematography: Norbert F. Brodin
- Edited by: Edward M. Roskam
- Music by: Modest Altschuler; Cecil Copping; John LeRoy Johnston
- Production company: Frank Lloyd Productions
- Distributed by: Associated First National Pictures
- Release date: June 14, 1924 (U.S. theatrical)
- Running time: 123 minutes
- Country: United States
- Language: Silent (English intertitles)
- Budget: $800,000
- Box office: $2 million

The Sea Hawk is a 1924 American silent adventure film about an English noble sold into slavery who escapes and turns himself into a pirate king. Directed by Frank Lloyd, the screen adaptation was written by J. G. Hawks, based upon the 1915 Rafael Sabatini novel of the same name.

The Sea Hawk premiered on June 2, 1924, in New York City, twelve days before its theatrical debut.

The Sea Hawk

== Plot ==
Oliver Tressilian is a wealthy British baronet who is engaged to Lady Rosamund Godophin. His half-brother, Lionel Tressilian, wants Rosamund along with his brother's wealth.

Lionel murders Peter Godolphin, Rosamund's brother, and frames Oliver for the crime. He then arranges for Oliver to be kidnapped onto a ship. While at sea, the Spanish capture Oliver's ship and force him to join their crew. However, Oliver eventually escapes to a Moorish kingdom.

Oliver becomes Sakr-el-Bahr, a Moorish pirate known as the scourge of Christendom. Learning of Rosamund's impending marriage to Lionel, Oliver kidnaps both of them. To avoid having to turn Rosamund over to his Master, the Basha of Algiers, Oliver surrenders to a British ship. Rosamund then intercedes with the British to save Oliver's life. Following the death of Lionel, Oliver and Rosamund marry.

== Cast ==
- Milton Sills as Sir Oliver Tressilian
- Enid Bennett as Lady Rosamund Godolphin
- Lloyd Hughes as Lionel Tressilian
- Wallace Beery as Capt. Jasper Leigh
- Marc McDermott as Sir John Killigrew
- Wallace MacDonald as Peter Godolphin
- Bert Woodruff as Nick
- Claire Du Brey as Siren
- Lionel Belmore as Justice Anthony Baine
- Cristina Montt as The Infanta of Spain
- Albert Prisco as Yusuf-Ben-Moktar
- Frank Currier as Asad-ed-Din
- William Collier Jr. as Marsak
- Medea Radzina as Fenzileh
- Fred DeSilva as Ali
- Kathleen Key as Andalusian Slave Girl
- Hector Sarno as Tsmanni
- Robert Bolder as Ayoub
- Fred Spencer as Boatswain
- S.E. Jennings as Captain of Asad's Guards
- Henry A. Barrows as Bishop (uncredited)
- Carl D. Bruner as Undetermined Secondary Role (uncredited)
- Edwards Davis as Chief Justice of England (uncredited)
- Andrew Johnston as Sir Walter (uncredited)
- Theodore Lorch as Turkish Merchant (uncredited)
- Louis Morrison as Innkeeper (uncredited)
- George O'Brien as Galley Slave (uncredited)
- Kate Price as Innkeeper's Wife (uncredited)
- George Romain as Spanish Commander (uncredited)
- Walter Wilkinson as Oliver's Young Son (uncredited)
- Nancy Zann as Spanish Slave Girl (uncredited)

== Production ==
Director Frank Lloyd recognized that moviegoers of 1924 would be put off by miniature models, and instructed that full-sized ships be created for use in the film at a cost of $200,000. This was done by outfitting the wooden exteriors of existing craft to the design of Fred Gabourie, known for his work in constructing props used in Buster Keaton films. The ocean scenes were filmed off the coast of California's Catalina Island, with 150 tents set up on the island for housing and support of the film's 1,000 extras, 21 technicians, 14 actors, and 64 sailors.

A movie with the same title (but an entirely different plot) was released in 1940, starring Errol Flynn. The studio used some key scenes from battles in the 1924 film. They spliced the scenes into the 1940 film, thinking they could not have been done better. The life-sized replicas were considered so well recreated, that Warner Bros. repeatedly used them in later nautical films.

== Reception ==
When the film was released, a New York Times critic called it, "far and away the best sea story that has ever been bought to the screen". It held that unofficial status for years.

== In other media ==
The film is referenced in The Lost World (1925) when the explorers return to London and there is a shot of the London Pavilion with a flashing sign advertising a showing of The Sea Hawk.

Some of the film's sea-battle footage was used in the 1935 film Captain Blood.
