= Scaramouche (1923 film) =

1923 film by Rex Ingram

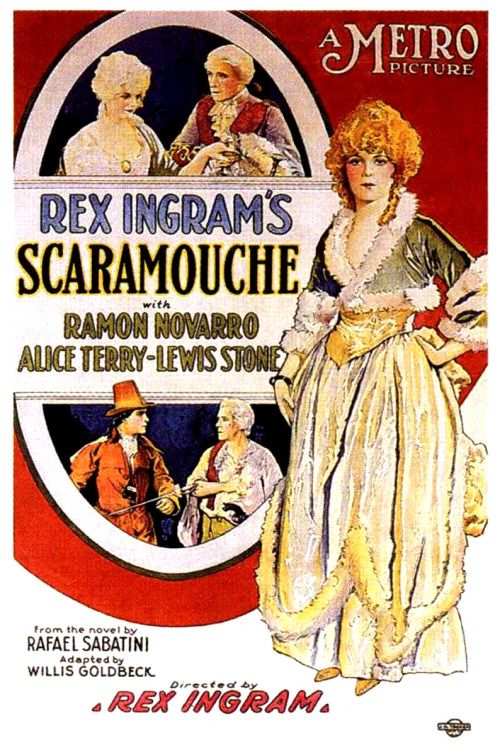
- Directed by: Rex Ingram
- Written by: Willis Goldbeck (scenario)
- Based on: Scaramouche; 1921 novel by Rafael Sabatini
- Produced by: Rex Ingram
- Starring: Ramon Novarro; Alice Terry; Lewis Stone
- Cinematography: John Seitz
- Edited by: Grant Whytock
- Distributed by: Metro Pictures
- Release date: September 30, 1923
- Running time: 124 minutes (10 reels at 9,850 ft)
- Country: United States
- Languages: Silent (English intertitles)
- Box office: $1 million

Scaramouche is a 1923 American silent swashbuckler film based on the 1921 novel Scaramouche by Rafael Sabatini, directed by Rex Ingram, released by Metro Pictures, and starring Ramon Novarro, Alice Terry, Lewis Stone, and Lloyd Ingraham.

Scaramouche entered the public domain in the United States on January 1, 2019.

== Plot ==
Scaramouche (1923)

André-Louis Moreau loves Aline de Kercadiou, the niece of his godfather, Quintin de Kercadiou, and she loves him as well. However, Quintin prefers that she marry the Marquis de la Tour d'Azyr, a middle-aged nobleman, rather than someone who does not even know who his parents are.

One day, expert swordsman de la Tour first toys with, then kills André's friend Philippe de Vilmorin in a duel. André turns to the king's lieutenant for justice. However, when the official learns who the accused is, he immediately orders André's arrest. André flees.

Meanwhile, France nears the brink of revolution. When one orator in favor of liberty and equality is shot and killed by a soldier, André fearlessly takes his place and remains undaunted when he is grazed by a bullet. When the dragoons are called to disperse the mob, an admirer named Chapelier helps André escape.

He joins a wandering theatre troupe led by Challefau Binet. André writes better plays for them to perform, and they become very successful, eventually performing at a theatre in Paris. André becomes engaged to Climène, Binet's daughter.

Aline and de la Tour attend a performance of his latest work, and she and André see each other. She goes to him, but he does not wish to renew their relationship. De la Tour, despite loving Aline, cannot help trifling with Climène. By chance, Aline and Countess de Plougastel, with whom she is staying, see him in a carriage with Climène. Aline informs de la Tour she never wants to see him again. De la Tour blackmails the countess into helping him, reminding her of an incident in her past.

Meanwhile, in the National Assembly, the aristocrats, unable to effectively respond to the reform-minded delegates with words, resort to duels to eliminate their leading opponents. Chief among the duelists is de la Tour. In desperation, Danton and Chapelier recruit André to reply in kind. The Chevalier de Chabrillone is his first victim. Eventually, he gets what he wants: a duel with de la Tour. He disarms his foe, then allows him to retrieve his sword. After André wounds the nobleman, de la Tour gives up.

When news reaches Paris that the Austrians and Prussians have invaded France in support of the beleaguered King Louis XVI, the French Revolution erupts. In the fighting, de la Tour is overwhelmed and left for dead. When he revives, he staggers to the residence of the countess. André goes there too to rescue his love and his mother the countess (whose identity has been revealed to him by de Kercadiou), armed with a passport signed by Danton authorizing him to do anything he wants. When the two bitter enemies spot each other, de la Tour demands the passport. André refuses, and de la Tour draws a pistol. When the countess reveals that he is in fact André's father, the two men have an initially uneasy reconciliation. When de la Tour starts to leave, André offers him his sword. Thus armed, de la Tour faces the rioters in the street and perishes.

André places the two women in a covered carriage. At the Paris gate, a man spots the aristocrats inside and demands they be handed to the mob. Moreau pleads with them to let them go for his sake. The masses respond with extravagant sentimentality, and the trio are allowed to leave Paris.

== Cast ==
- Lloyd Ingraham as Quintin de Kercadiou
- Alice Terry as Aline de Kercadiou, his niece
- Ramon Novarro as André-Louis Moreau, his godson
- Lewis Stone as The Marquis de la Tour d'Azyr
- Julia Swayne Gordon as The Countess Thérèse de Plougastel
- William Humphrey as The Chevalier de Chabrillone
- Otto Matieson as Philippe de Vilmorin
- George Siegmann as Danton
- Bowditch M. Turner as Chapelier
- James Marcus as Challefau Binet
- Edith Allen as Climène Binet
- John George as Polichinelle
- Willard Lee Hall as The King's Lieutenant
- Rose Dione as La Révolte

Uncredited cast:

- Edwin Argus as King Louis XVI
- J. Edwin Brown as Monsieur Benoit
- Louise Carver as Member of Theatre Audience
- Edward Connelly as Minister to the King

== Production ==
Scaramouche was an elaborate and unwieldy production that suffered from delays and cost overruns. Rex Ingram secured the rights to Rafael Sabatini's 1921 novel in September 1922, just after the release of The Prisoner of Zenda, a film he also directed and produced. Pre-production of Scaramouche took seven months. It was screenwriter and future director Willis Goldbeck first screenplay.

David Sharpe, a stunt performer who had played along fencing master Fred Cavens in Douglas Fairbanks's Robin Hood (1922), was hired for the fight choreography. Extensive outdoor sets by Harold Grieve representing 18th-century Paris were built on the Metro Pictures' backlot and in the San Fernando Valley, with up to 1,500 background actors. An experimental sequence was shot in Technicolor but proved unsatisfactory and was discarded. The Technicolor company paid for the expense.

== Release ==
Scaramouche was given a prestigious 22-unit roadshow release upon its completion in 1924. The film was financially successful in the United States and broke box-office records in Paris and London.

== Home media ==
Since March 24, 2009, it has been available on DVD from the Warner Archive Collection.
