= The Gates of Doom (film) =

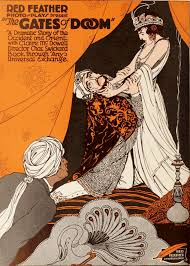
- Directed by: Charles Swickard
- Written by: J. Grubb Alexander
- Starring: Claire McDowell; Lee Shumway; Mark Fenton
- Cinematography: Harry McGuire Stanley
- Production company: Universal Pictures
- Distributed by: Universal Pictures
- Release date: March 5, 1917
- Running time: 50 minutes
- Country: United States
- Languages: Silent; English intertitles

The Gates of Doom is a 1917 American silent drama film directed by Charles Swickard and starring Claire McDowell, Lee Shumway and Mark Fenton.

== Cast ==
- Claire McDowell as Indore / Agatha
- Lee Shumway as Francis Duane
- Jack Connolly as Terence Unger
- Mark Fenton as Sir Ethelbert Duane
- Tommie Dale as Florence Duane
- Alfred Allen as Grand Duke Alexis
- Francis McDonald as Jang Sattib
- Lina Basquette as Agatha as a child

== Bibliography ==
- George A. Katchmer. Eighty Silent Film Stars: Biographies and Filmographies of the Obscure to the Well Known. McFarland, 1991.
