= Rafael Sabatini =

Italian-British writer (1875–1950)

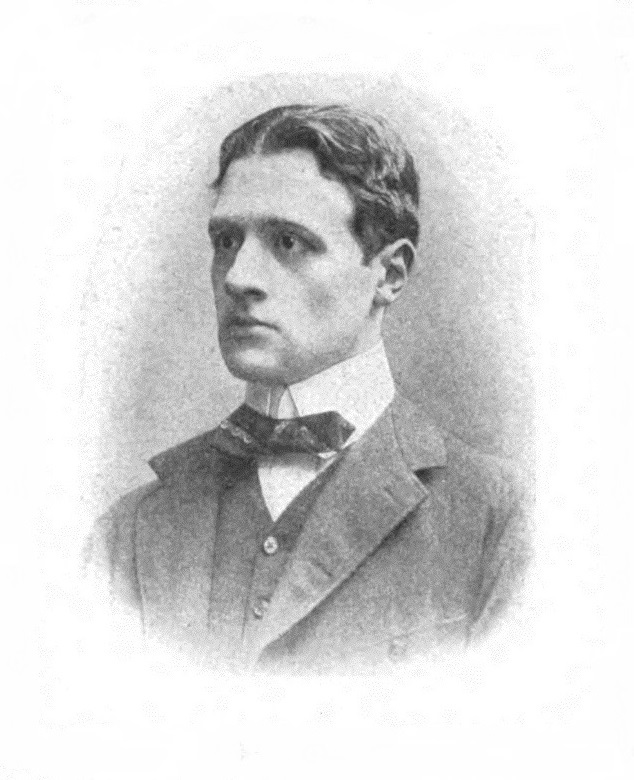
- Born: 29 April 1875; Jesi, Kingdom of Italy
- Died: 13 February 1950 (aged 74); Adelboden, Switzerland
- Occupation: Novelist
- Writing career
- Genres: romance, adventure
- Notable works: Scaramouche, Captain Blood
- Movement: Neo-romanticism

Rafael Sabatini (29 April 1875 – 13 February 1950) was an Italian-born British writer of romance and adventure novels.

He is best known for his worldwide bestsellers: The Sea Hawk (1915), Scaramouche (1921), Captain Blood (a.k.a. Captain Blood: His Odyssey) (1922), and Bellarion the Fortunate (1926). Several of his novels have been made into films, both silent and sound.

In all, Sabatini produced 34 novels, eight short story collections, six non-fiction books, numerous uncollected short stories, and several plays.

== Life as an author ==
After a brief stint in the business world, Sabatini went to work as a writer. His first published short story, "The Red Mask," was printed in 1898, and his first novel came out in 1902. It took Sabatini roughly a quarter of a century of hard work before he attained success in 1921 with Scaramouche. The novel, an historical romance set during the French Revolution, became an international bestseller. It was followed the next year by the equally successful Captain Blood. All of his earlier books were then rushed into reprints, the most popular of which was The Sea Hawk (originally published in 1915).

Sabatini was a frequent writer who published a new book approximately every year. With his high output and well-crafted stories he was able to maintain his popularity with the reading public through the decades that followed.

In the early 1940s illness from stomach cancer forced Sabatini to slow his prolific writing. He only published three more books before his death in 1950: King in Prussia (also known as The Birth of Mischief, 1944), Turbulent Tales (a collection of short stories, 1946), and The Gamester (1949).

== Personal life ==
Rafael Sabatini was born in Jesi, Italy, to an English mother, Anna Trafford, and Italian father, Vincenzo Sabatini. His parents were opera singers who then became teachers.

At a young age Sabatini was exposed to many languages living with his grandfather in Britain. He attended school in Portugal, and as a teenager in Switzerland. By the time he was 17, when he returned to Britain to live permanently, he had become proficient in five languages. He quickly added a sixth language – English – to his linguistic collection. He consciously chose to write in his adopted language, because, he said, "all the best stories are written in English".

In 1905, he married Ruth Goad Dixon, the daughter of a Liverpool merchant. They had a son, Sabatini's only son, Rafael-Angelo (nicknamed Binkie). He was killed in a car crash on 1 April 1927. In 1931, Sabatini and Ruth divorced. Later that year he moved from London to Clifford, Herefordshire, near Hay-on-Wye.

In 1935, he married the sculptor Christine Dixon (née Wood), his former sister-in-law - she had been married previously to Ruth's brother, Hugh Wainwright Dixon. They suffered further tragedy when Christine and Hugh's son, Lancelot Steele Dixon, was killed aged 23 in a flying accident on the day he received his RAF wings, on 9 April 1940; he flew his aeroplane over his family's house, but the plane went out of control and crashed in flames right before the observers' eyes.

Sabatini died in Switzerland 13 February 1950. He was buried in Adelboden, Switzerland. On his headstone his wife had written, "He was born with a gift of laughter and a sense that the world was mad", the first line of Scaramouche.

== Influence ==
Historical fiction writers who have been influenced by Sabatini's work include George MacDonald Fraser, Rosemary Rogers, Bernard Cornwell, James Reasoner, and Parris Afton Bonds.

Sabatini's work has also been an inspiration to science fiction and fantasy writers, including Robert E. Howard, Gordon R. Dickson, Michael Moorcock, Tim Powers and Adrian Cole.

== Film adaptations ==
=== Sound films ===
Several of his novels were made into notable films in the sound era:

- Scaramouche in 1952,
- Captain Blood in 1935, and
- The Black Swan in 1942.

The 1940 film The Sea Hawk, with Errol Flynn, is not an adaptation but a wholly new story which just used his novel's title.

=== Silent films ===
His novel Bardelys the Magnificent was made into a famous 1926 "lost" film of the same title, directed by King Vidor, starring John Gilbert, and long viewable only in a fragment excerpted in Vidor's silent comedy Show People (1928). All but one of the reels of Bardelys were rediscovered in France in 2006, and a restoration (with production stills standing in for the missing reel) was completed in 2008.

A silent version of The Tavern Knight (1920) was made in England.

A silent version of Captain Blood (1924), directed by David Smith and starring J. Warren Kerrigan, which was one of the last productions of the Vitagraph Company of America, survives in the Library of Congress, and two other silent adaptations of Sabatini novels which survive in other archives are Rex Ingram's Scaramouche (1923) starring Ramón Novarro at the George Eastman Museum, and Frank Lloyd's The Sea Hawk starring Milton Sills at the UCLA Film and Television Archive.

== Works ==
=== Series ===
==== Scaramouche ====
- Scaramouche (1921), a tale of the French Revolution in which a fugitive hides out in a commedia dell'arte troupe and later becomes a fencing master.
- Scaramouche the King-Maker (1931), Sabatini wrote this sequel after ten years.

==== Captain Blood ====
- Tales of the Brethren of the Main (a series of short stories first published in Premier Magazine from 1920 to 1921) (Note: Most of the stories were woven together by the author to form Captain Blood, and two that were not were included in Captain Blood Returns.)
- Captain Blood (also known as Captain Blood: His Odyssey, 1922), in which the title character escapes from unjust slavery to become admiral of a fleet of pirate ships.
- Captain Blood Returns (also known as The Chronicles of Captain Blood, 1931) (Note: N.B. Captain Blood Returns and The Fortunes of Captain Blood are not sequels, but collections of short stories set entirely within the timeframe of the original novel.) (Note: One of the stories from this collection, "The Treasure Ship", was reprinted as a standalone paperback in 2004.)
- The Fortunes of Captain Blood (1936)

=== Other Novels ===
- The Lovers of Yvonne (also known as The Suitors of Yvonne, 1902)
- The Tavern Knight (1904)
- Bardelys the Magnificent (1906)
- The Trampling of the Lilies (1906)
- Love-At-Arms: Being a narrative excerpted from the chronicles of Urbino during the dominion of the High and Mighty Messer Guidobaldo da Montefeltro (1907)
- The Shame of Motley (1908)
- St. Martin's Summer (also known as The Queen's Messenger, 1909)
- Mistress Wilding (also known as Anthony Wilding, 1910)
- The Lion's Skin (1911)
- The Strolling Saint (1913)
- The Gates of Doom (1914)
- The Sea Hawk (1915), a tale of an Elizabethan Englishman among the pirates of the Barbary Coast.
- The Snare (1917)
- Fortune's Fool (1923)
- The Carolinian (1924)
- Bellarion the Fortunate (1926), about a cunning young man who finds himself immersed in the politics of fifteenth-century Italy.
- The Nuptials of Corbal (1927)
- The Hounds of God (1928)
- The Romantic Prince (1929)
- The Reaping (1929)
- The King's Minion (also known as The Minion, 1930)
- The Black Swan (1932)
- The Stalking Horse (1933)
- Venetian Masque (1934)
- Chivalry (1935)
- The Lost King (1937)
- The Sword of Islam (1939)
- The Marquis of Carabas (also known as Master-At-Arms, 1940)
- Columbus (1941)
- King in Prussia (also known as The Birth of Mischief, 1944)
- The Gamester (1949)

=== Collections ===
- The Justice of the Duke (1912)
  - The Honour of Varano
  - The Test Ferrante's jest
  - Gismondi's wage
  - The Snare
  - The Lust of Conquest
  - The pasquinade
- The Banner of the Bull (1915)
- Turbulent Tales (1946) (Note: Includes several stories about Alessandro Cagliostro, and one connected to Captain Blood.)

==== Posthumous collections ====
- Saga of the Sea (omnibus comprising The Sea Hawk, The Black Swan and Captain Blood, 1953)
- Sinner, Saint And Jester: A Trilogy in Romantic Adventure (omnibus comprising The Snare, The Strolling Saint and The Shame of Motley, 1954)
- In the Shadow of the Guillotine (omnibus comprising Scaramouche, The Marquis of Carabas and The Lost King, 1955)
- A Fair Head of Angling Stories (1989)
- The Fortunes of Casanova and Other Stories (1994, stories originally published 1907–1921 & 1934)
- The Outlaws of Falkensteig (2000, stories originally published in Pearson's Magazine 1900–1902)
- The Camisade: And Other Stories of the French Revolution (2001, stories originally published 1900–1916)
- The Evidence of the Sword and Other Mysteries, ed. Jesse Knight (Crippen & Landru, 2006, stories originally published 1898–1916)

=== Plays ===
- Bardelys the Magnificent (with Henry Hamilton)
- Fugitives
- In the Snare (with Leon M. Lion)
- Scaramouche
- The Rattlesnake (also known as The Carolinian, 1922, with J. E. Harold Terry)
- The Tyrant: An Episode in the Career of Cesare Borgia, a Play in Four Acts (1925). Borgia was played by Louis Calhern.

=== Anthologies edited ===
- A Century of Sea Stories (1935)
- A Century of Historical Stories (1936)
- The Hypnotic Tales of Rafael Sabatini (2024)

=== Nonfiction ===
- The Life of Cesare Borgia (1912)
- Torquemada and the Spanish Inquisition: A History (original edition 1913, revised edition 1930)
- The Historical Nights' Entertainment (1917) (Note: The Historical Nights' Entertainment stories are 'factions' – truth so far as anyone knows it, embellished with imagination. Some are actually apocryphal, not even history.)
  - The night of Holyrood – The Murder of David Rizzio
  - The night of Kirk O'Field – The Murder of Darnley
  - The night of Bertrayal – Antonio Perez and Philip II of Spain
  - The night of Charity – The Case of the Lady Alice Lisle
  - The night of Massacre – The Story of the Saint Bartholomew
  - The night of Witchcraft – Louis XIV and Madame De Montespan
  - The night of Gems – The "Affairs" Of The Queen's Necklace
  - The night of Terror – The Drownings at Nantes Under Carrier
  - The night of Nuptials – Charles The Bold And Sapphira Danvelt
  - The night of Stranglers – Govanna of Naples And Andreas of Hungary
  - The night of Hate – The Murder of the Duke of Gandia
  - The night of Escape – Casanova's Escape From The Piombi
  - The night of Masquerade – The Assassination of Gustavus III of Sweden
- The Historical Nights' Entertainment – Series 2 (1919)
  - The absolution – Affonso Henriques, first king of Portugal
  - The false Demetrius – Boris Godunov and the pretended son of Ivan the Terrible
  - The hermosa fembra – an episode of the Inquisition in Seville
  - The pastry-cook of Madrigal – the story of the false Sebastian of Portugal
  - The end of the "vert galant" – the assassination of Henry IV
  - The barren wooing – the murder of Amy Robsart
  - Sir Judas – the betrayal of Sir Walter Raleigh
  - His Insolence of Buckingham – George Villiers' courtship of Anne of Austria
  - The path of exile – the fall of Lord Clarendon
  - The tragedy of Herrenhausen – Count Philip Königsmark and the Princess Sophia Dorothea
  - The tyrannicide – Charlotte Corday and Jean Paul Marat
- The Historical Nights' Entertainment – Series 3 (1938)
  - The king's conscience – Henry VIII and Anne Boleyn
  - Jane the queen – The Lady Jane Grey
  - The 'crooked carcase' – Queen Elizabeth and the Earl of Essex
  - The forbidden fruit – The Marriage of the Lady Arabella Stuart
  - The merchant's daughter – Catherine de' Medici and the Guises
  - The king of Paris – The Assassination of Henri de Guise
  - The tragedy of Madame – The End of Henriette d'Angleterre
  - The vagabond queen – Christine of Sweden and the Murder of Monaldeschi
  - The queen's gambit – Maria-Theresa and the Elector of Bavaria
  - The secret adversary – The Rise and Fall of Johann Frederich Struensee
  - Madam Resourceful – Catherine of Russia and Poniatowski
  - The victor of vendémiaire – Barras' Account of Bonaparte's Courtship of La Montansier
- Heroic Lives (1934)
