= List of American films of 1948 =

American films released in 1948

More than 365 American feature films were released in 1948.

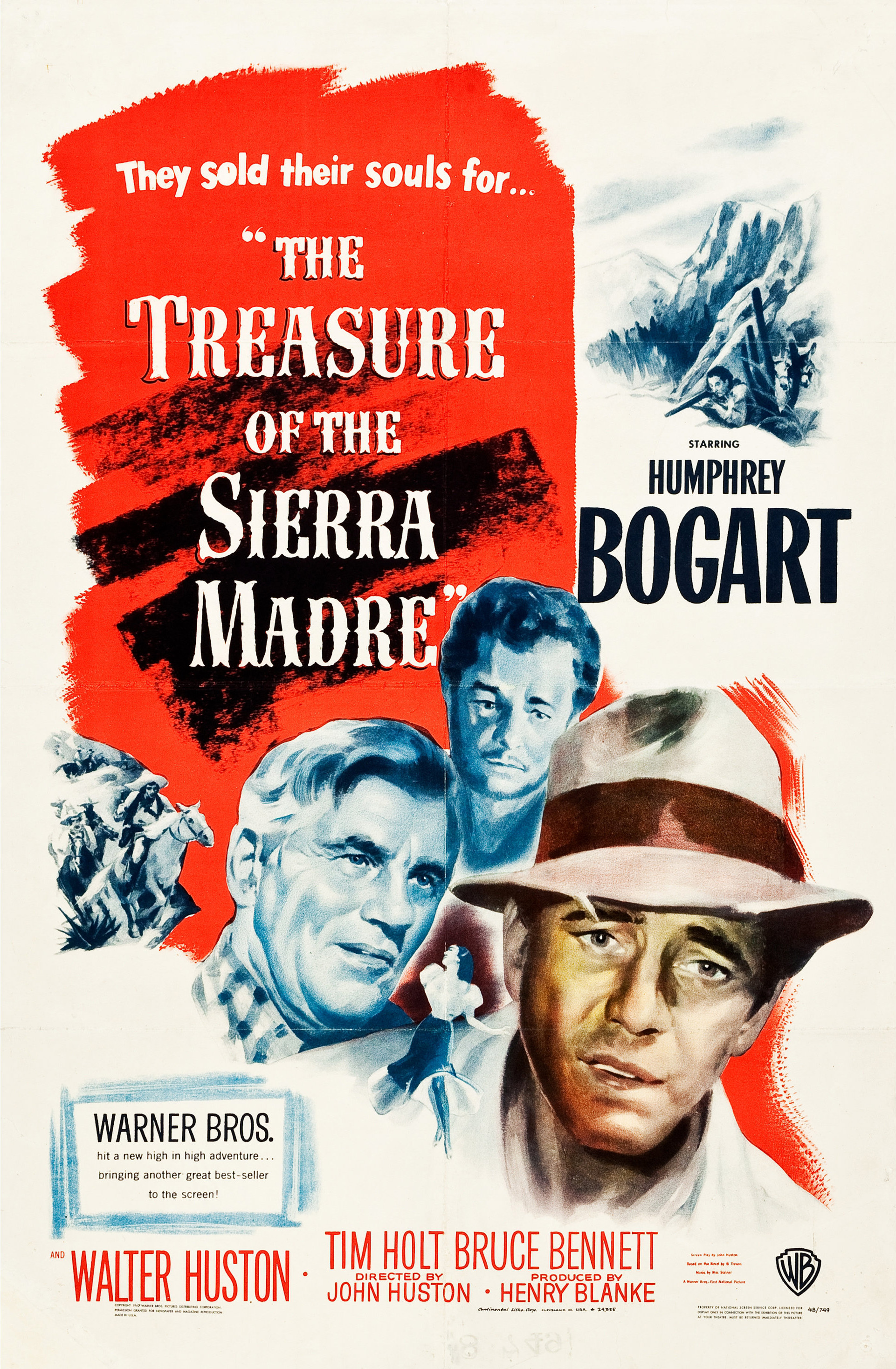
The Treasure of the Sierra Madre starring Humphrey Bogart.

== A–B ==
Title	Director	Cast	Genre	Notes
13 Lead Soldiers	Frank McDonald	Tom Conway, Maria Palmer, Helen Westcott	Mystery	20th Century Fox
3 Godfathers	John Ford	John Wayne, Harry Carey Jr., Pedro Armendáriz, Mae Marsh	Western	MGM
Abbott and Costello Meet Frankenstein	Charles Barton	Bud Abbott, Lou Costello, Lon Chaney Jr., Bela Lugosi, Glenn Strange	Comedy, Horror	Universal Pictures
An Act of Murder	Michael Gordon	Fredric March, Edmond O'Brien, Florence Eldridge	Film noir	Universal
Adventures in Silverado	Phil Karlson	William Bishop, Gloria Henry, Edgar Buchanan	Western	Columbia
Adventures of Don Juan	Vincent Sherman	Errol Flynn, Viveca Lindfors, Robert Douglas	Adventure	Warner Bros.
Adventures of Gallant Bess	Lew Landers	Cameron Mitchell, Audrey Long, Fuzzy Knight	Western	Eagle-Lion
Albuquerque	Ray Enright	Randolph Scott, Barbara Britton, George "Gabby" Hayes	Western	Paramount
Alias a Gentleman	Harry Beaumont	Wallace Beery, Dorothy Patrick, Gladys George	Comedy	MGM
All My Sons	Irving Reis	Edward G. Robinson, Burt Lancaster, Mady Christians	Drama	Universal
The Amazing Mr. X	Bernard Vorhaus	Turhan Bey, Lynn Bari, Cathy O'Donnell	Horror	Eagle-Lion
Angel in Exile	Allan Dwan	John Carroll, Adele Mara, Barton MacLane	Western	Republic
Angel on the Amazon	John H. Auer	George Brent, Vera Ralston, Brian Aherne, Constance Bennett	Adventure	Republic
Angels' Alley	William Beaudine	Leo Gorcey, Huntz Hall, Rosemary LaPlanche	Comedy	Monogram
Another Part of the Forest	Michael Gordon	Fredric March, Florence Eldridge, Dan Duryea	Drama	Universal
Apartment for Peggy	George Seaton	Jeanne Crain, William Holden, Edmund Gwenn	Comedy	20th Century Fox
Appointment with Murder	Jack Bernhard	John Calvert, Catherine Craig, Lyle Talbot	Crime	Film Classics
April Showers	László Benedek	Ann Sothern, Jack Carson, Robert Alda	Musical	Warner Bros.
Arch of Triumph	Lewis Milestone	Ingrid Bergman, Charles Boyer, Charles Laughton	War	United Artists
Are You with It?	Jack Hively	Donald O'Connor, Olga San Juan, Martha Stewart	Musical comedy	Universal
The Argyle Secrets	Cy Endfield	William Gargan, Marjorie Lord, Ralph Byrd	Mystery	Film Classics
The Arizona Ranger	John Rawlins	Tim Holt, Jack Holt, Nan Leslie	Western	RKO
The Arkansas Swing	Ray Nazarro	Gloria Henry, June Vincent, Elinor Donahue	Musical	Columbia
Arthur Takes Over	Malcolm St. Clair	Lois Collier, Richard Crane, Jerome Cowan	Comedy	20th Century Fox
Assigned to Danger	Budd Boetticher	Gene Raymond, Noreen Nash, Robert Bice	Film noir	Eagle-Lion
B.F.'s Daughter	Robert Z. Leonard	Barbara Stanwyck, Van Heflin, Charles Coburn	Drama	MGM
The Babe Ruth Story	Roy Del Ruth	William Bendix, Claire Trevor, Charles Bickford	Biopic	Allied Artists
Back Trail	Christy Cabanne	Johnny Mack Brown, Raymond Hatton, Mildred Coles	Western	Monogram
Behind Locked Doors	Budd Boetticher	Lucille Bremer, Richard Carlson, Douglas Fowley	Film noir	Eagle-Lion
Belle Starr's Daughter	Lesley Selander	George Montgomery, Ruth Roman, Rod Cameron	Western	20th Century Fox
Berlin Express	Jacques Tourneur	Merle Oberon, Robert Ryan, Paul Lukas	Film noir	RKO
Best Man Wins	John Sturges	Anna Lee, Edgar Buchanan, Robert Shayne	Drama	Columbia
Beyond Glory	John Farrow	Donna Reed, Alan Ladd, George Coulouris	Drama	Paramount
Big City	Norman Taurog	Robert Preston, George Murphy, Danny Thomas	Drama	MGM
The Big Clock	John Farrow	Charles Laughton, Ray Milland, Maureen O'Sullivan	Film noir	Paramount
The Big Punch	Sherry Shourds	Gordon MacRae, Lois Maxwell, Wayne Morris	Sports drama	Warner Bros.
Big Town Scandal	William C. Thomas	Hillary Brooke, Phillip Reed, Stanley Clements	Drama	Paramount; fourth of series
The Black Arrow	Gordon Douglas	Louis Hayward, Janet Blair, George Macready	Adventure	Columbia
Black Bart	George Sherman	Dan Duryea, Yvonne De Carlo, Jeffrey Lynn	Western	Universal
Black Eagle	Robert Gordon	William Bishop, Virginia Patton, Gordon Jones	Western	Columbia
Blazing Across the Pecos	Ray Nazarro	Charles Starrett, Patricia Barry, Smiley Burnette	Western	Columbia
Blonde Ice	Jack Bernhard	Robert Paige, Leslie Brooks, Michael Whalen	Film noir	Film Classics
Blondie's Reward	Abby Berlin	Penny Singleton, Arthur Lake, Jerome Cowan	Comedy	Columbia
Blondie's Secret	Edward Bernds	Penny Singleton, Arthur Lake, Jerome Cowan	Comedy	Columbia
Blood on the Moon	Robert Wise	Robert Mitchum, Robert Preston, Barbara Bel Geddes	Western	RKO
Bodyguard	Richard Fleischer	Lawrence Tierney, Priscilla Lane, Phillip Reed	Film noir	RKO
The Bold Frontiersman	Philip Ford	Allan Lane, Eddy Waller, Roy Barcroft	Western	Republic
Borrowed Trouble	George Archainbaud	William Boyd, Andy Clyde, Rand Brooks	Western	United Artists
The Boy with Green Hair	Joseph Losey	Dean Stockwell, Pat O'Brien, Barbara Hale	Drama	RKO
The Bride Goes Wild	Norman Taurog	June Allyson, Van Johnson, Hume Cronyn	Comedy	MGM
Bungalow 13	Edward L. Cahn	Tom Conway, Margaret Hamilton, Richard Cromwell	Mystery	20th Century Fox

== C–D ==
Title	Director	Cast	Genre	Notes
Caged Fury	William Berke	Richard Denning, Sheila Ryan, Mary Beth Hughes	Drama	Paramount
California Firebrand	Philip Ford	Monte Hale, Lorna Gray, Paul Hurst	Western	Republic
Call Northside 777	Henry Hathaway	James Stewart, Richard Conte, Lee J. Cobb	Film noir	20th Century Fox
Campus Honeymoon	Richard Sale	Lee and Lyn Wilde, Adele Mara, Richard Crane	Comedy	Republic
Campus Sleuth	Will Jason	Freddie Stewart, June Preisser, Noel Neill	Comedy	Monogram
Canon City	Crane Wilbur	Scott Brady, Jeff Corey, Stanley Clements	Film noir	Eagle-Lion
Carson City Raiders	Yakima Canutt	Allan Lane, Eddy Waller, Frank Reicher	Western	Republic
Casbah	John Berry	Yvonne de Carlo, Tony Martin, Peter Lorre	Film Noir	Universal
The Challenge	Jean Yarbrough	Tom Conway, June Vincent, John Newland	Mystery	20th Century Fox; Bulldog Drummond
The Checkered Coat	Edward L. Cahn	Tom Conway, Noreen Nash, Hurd Hatfield	Drama	20th Century Fox
Check Your Guns	Ray Taylor	Eddie Dean, Roscoe Ates, Nancy Gates	Western	Eagle-Lion
Close-Up	Jack Donohue	Alan Baxter, Virginia Gilmore, Richard Kollmar	Film noir	Eagle-Lion
The Cobra Strikes	Charles Reisner	Sheila Ryan, Richard Fraser, Leslie Brooks	Thriller	Eagle-Lion
Command Decision	Sam Wood	Clark Gable, Walter Pidgeon, Van Johnson	War	MGM
Coroner Creek	Ray Enright	Randolph Scott, Marguerite Chapman, Sally Eilers	Western	Columbia
The Counterfeiters	Sam Newfield	Doris Merrick, Hugh Beaumont, John Sutton	Crime	20th Century Fox
The Countess of Monte Cristo	Frederick De Cordova	Sonja Henie, Olga San Juan, Dorothy Hart	Comedy	Universal
Courtin' Trouble	Ford Beebe	Jimmy Wakely, Dub Taylor, Virginia Belmont	Western	Monogram
Cowboy Cavalier	Derwin Abrahams	Jimmy Wakely, Dub Taylor, Claire Whitney	Western musical	Monogram
The Creeper	Jean Yarbrough	Eduardo Ciannelli, Onslow Stevens, June Vincent	Horror	20th Century Fox
Crossed Trails	Lambert Hillyer	Johnny Mack Brown, Raymond Hatton, Lynne Carver	Western	Monogram
Cry of the City	Robert Siodmak	Victor Mature, Richard Conte, Shelley Winters	Film noir	20th Century Fox
Daredevils of the Clouds	George Blair	Robert Livingston, Mae Clarke, James Cardwell	Drama	Republic
The Dark Past	Rudolph Maté	William Holden, Nina Foch, Lee J. Cobb	Film noir	Columbia
A Date with Judy	Richard Thorpe	Wallace Beery, Jane Powell, Elizabeth Taylor	Musical	MGM
The Dead Don't Dream	George Archainbaud	William Boyd, Andy Clyde, Rand Brooks	Western	United Artists
Dead Man's Gold	Ray Taylor	Lash La Rue, Al St. John, Peggy Stewart	Western	Lippert
Deadline	Oliver Drake	Sunset Carson, Lee Roberts, Frank Ellis	Western	Astor
The Decision of Christopher Blake	Peter Godfrey	Alexis Smith, Cecil Kellaway, Robert Douglas	Drama	Warner Bros.
Deep Waters	Henry King	Jean Peters, Dana Andrews, Cesar Romero	Drama	20th Century Fox
The Denver Kid	Philip Ford	Allan Lane, Eddy Waller, Douglas Fowley	Western	Republic
Desperadoes of Dodge City	Philip Ford	Allan Lane, Mildred Coles, Eddy Waller	Western	Republic
Devil's Cargo	John F. Link	John Calvert, Rochelle Hudson, Lyle Talbot	Mystery	Film Classics
Disaster	William H. Pine	Richard Denning, Trudy Marshall, Damian O'Flynn	Drama	Paramount
Docks of New Orleans	Derwin Abrahams	Roland Winters, Virginia Dale, Mantan Moreland	Mystery	Monogram; Charlie Chan
Dream Girl	Mitchell Leisen	Betty Hutton, Patric Knowles, Virginia Field	Comedy	Paramount
The Dude Goes West	Kurt Neumann	Eddie Albert, Gale Storm, Gilbert Roland	Western comedy	Allied Artists

== E–F ==
Title	Director	Cast	Genre	Notes
Easter Parade	Charles Walters	Fred Astaire, Judy Garland, Ann Miller, Peter Lawford	Musical	MGM; Academy Award for Best Musical Score
El Dorado Pass	Ray Nazarro	Charles Starrett, Elena Verdugo, Smiley Burnette	Western	Columbia
Embraceable You	Felix Jacoves	Dane Clark, Geraldine Brooks, Wallace Ford	Drama	Warner Bros.
The Emperor Waltz	Billy Wilder	Bing Crosby, Joan Fontaine, Roland Culver	Musical comedy	Paramount
The Enchanted Valley	Robert Emmett Tansey	Alan Curtis, Anne Gwynne, Charley Grapewin	Drama	Eagle-Lion
Enchantment	Irving Reis	David Niven, Teresa Wright, Evelyn Keyes	Romance	RKO
Escape	Joseph L. Mankiewicz	Rex Harrison, Peggy Cummins, William Hartnell	Thriller	20th Century Fox; American/British co-production
Every Girl Should Be Married	Don Hartman	Cary Grant, Betsy Drake, Diana Lynn	Comedy	RKO
Eyes of Texas	William Witney	Roy Rogers, Lynne Roberts, Andy Devine	Western	Republic
False Paradise	George Archainbaud	William Boyd, Elaine Riley, Andy Clyde	Western	United Artists
The Far Frontier	William Witney	Roy Rogers, Clayton Moore, Gail Davis	Western	Republic
The Feathered Serpent	William Beaudine	Roland Winters, Keye Luke, Carol Forman	Mystery	Monogram; Charlie Chan
Feudin', Fussin' and A-Fightin'	George Sherman	Donald O'Connor, Penny Edwards, Marjorie Main	Comedy	Universal
Fighter Squadron	Raoul Walsh	Edmond O'Brien, Robert Stack, John Rodney	War	Warner Bros.
Fighting Back	Malcolm St. Clair	Jean Rogers, Paul Langton, Gary Gray	Drama	20th Century Fox
Fighting Father Dunne	Ted Tetzlaff	Pat O'Brien, Una O'Connor, Charles Kemper	Drama	RKO
Fighting Mustang	Oliver Drake	Sunset Carson, Lee Roberts, Al Ferguson	Western	Astor
The Fighting Ranger	Lambert Hillyer	Johnny Mack Brown, Raymond Hatton, Marshall Reed	Western	Monogram
Force of Evil	Abraham Polonsky	John Garfield, Beatrice Pearson, Marie Windsor	Film noir	MGM
A Foreign Affair	Billy Wilder	Jean Arthur, Marlene Dietrich, John Lund	Comedy	Paramount
For the Love of Mary	Frederick de Cordova	Deanna Durbin, Edmond O'Brien, Jeffrey Lynn	Comedy	Universal
Fort Apache	John Ford	John Wayne, Henry Fonda, Shirley Temple	Western	RKO
Four Faces West	Alfred E. Green	Joel McCrea, Frances Dee, Charles Bickford	Western	United Artists
French Leave	Frank McDonald	Jackie Cooper, Renee Godfrey, Jackie Coogan	Comedy	Monogram
Frontier Agent	Lambert Hillyer	Johnny Mack Brown, Raymond Hatton, Reno Browne	Western	Monogram
Frontier Revenge	Ray Taylor	Lash La Rue, Peggy Stewart, Jim Bannon	Western	Lippert
The Fuller Brush Man	S. Sylvan Simon	Red Skelton, Janet Blair, Hillary Brooke, Adele Jergens	Comedy	Columbia
Fury at Furnace Creek	H. Bruce Humberstone	Victor Mature, Coleen Gray, Reginald Gardiner	Western	20th Century Fox

== G–H ==
Title	Director	Cast	Genre	Notes
The Gallant Blade	Henry Levin	Larry Parks, Marguerite Chapman, Victor Jory	Adventure	Columbia
The Gallant Legion	Joseph Kane	Wild Bill Elliott, Lorna Gray, Joseph Schildkraut	Western	Republic
The Gay Intruders	Ray McCarey	John Emery, Tamara Geva, Virginia Gregg	Comedy	20th Century Fox
The Gay Ranchero	William Witney	Roy Rogers, Jane Frazee, Tito Guízar	Western	Republic
The Gentleman from Nowhere	William Castle	Warner Baxter, Fay Baker, Luis van Rooten	Crime	Columbia
The Girl from Manhattan	Alfred E. Green	Dorothy Lamour, George Montgomery, Charles Laughton	Comedy	United Artists
Give My Regards to Broadway	Lloyd Bacon	Dan Dailey, Nancy Guild, Fay Bainter	Musical	20th Century Fox
Glamour Girl	Arthur Dreifuss	Gene Krupa, Virginia Grey, Susan Reed	Musical	Columbia
The Golden Eye	William Beaudine	Roland Winters, Wanda McKay, Mantan Moreland	Mystery	Monogram; Charlie Chan
Good Sam	Leo McCarey	Gary Cooper, Ann Sheridan, Edmund Lowe	Comedy	RKO
Grand Canyon Trail	William Witney	Roy Rogers, Jane Frazee, Andy Devine	Western	Republic
Green Grass of Wyoming	Louis King	Peggy Cummins, Charles Coburn, Lloyd Nolan	Western	20th Century Fox
The Green Promise	William D. Russell	Marguerite Chapman, Walter Brennan, Robert Paige	Drama	RKO
Gunning for Justice	Ray Taylor	Johnny Mack Brown, Raymond Hatton, Evelyn Finley	Western	Monogram
Guns of Hate	Lesley Selander	Tim Holt, Nan Leslie, Richard Martin	Western	RKO
Gun Smugglers	Frank McDonald	Tim Holt, Martha Hyer, Richard Martin	Western	RKO
Half Past Midnight	William F. Claxton	Peggy Knudsen, Kent Taylor, Joe Sawyer	Mystery	20th Century Fox
Harpoon	Ewing Scott	John Bromfield, James Cardwell, Ed Hinton	Adventure	Lippert
The Hawk of Powder River	Ray Taylor	Eddie Dean, Jennifer Holt, Roscoe Ates	Western	Eagle-Lion
Hazard	George Marshall	Paulette Goddard, Macdonald Carey, Stanley Clements	Drama	Paramount
Heart of Virginia	R. G. Springsteen	Janet Martin, Robert Lowery, Frankie Darro	Drama	Republic
Here Comes Trouble	Fred Guiol	Joe Sawyer, William Tracy, Joan Woodbury	Comedy	United Artists
He Walked by Night	Alfred L. Werker, Anthony Mann	Richard Basehart, Jack Webb, Scott Brady	Film noir	Eagle-Lion
Hidden Danger	Ray Taylor	Johnny Mack Brown, Raymond Hatton, Christine Larson	Western	Monogram
Highway 13	William Berke	Robert Lowery, Pamela Blake, Michael Whalen	Drama	Lippert
Hills of Home	Fred M. Wilcox	Edmund Gwenn, Janet Leigh, Donald Crisp	Family	MGM
Hollow Triumph	Steve Sekely	Paul Henreid, Joan Bennett, Eduard Franz	Film noir	Eagle-Lion
Homecoming	Mervyn LeRoy	Clark Gable, Lana Turner, Anne Baxter	Romance	MGM
Homicide for Three	George Blair	Audrey Long, Grant Withers, Warren Douglas	Mystery	Republic
The Hunted	Jack Bernhard	Preston Foster, Belita, Pierre Watkin	Film noir	Allied Artists

== I ==
Title	Director	Cast	Genre	Notes
I, Jane Doe	John H. Auer	Vera Ralston, Ruth Hussey, John Carroll	Thriller	Republic
I Love Trouble	S. Sylvan Simon	Franchot Tone, Janet Blair, Janis Carter	Film noir	Columbia
I Remember Mama	George Stevens	Irene Dunne, Barbara Bel Geddes, Oscar Homolka	Drama	RKO
I Surrender Dear	Arthur Dreifuss	Gloria Jean, David Street, Don McGuire	Musical	Columbia
I Walk Alone	Byron Haskin	Burt Lancaster, Lizabeth Scott, Kirk Douglas	Film noir	Paramount
I Wouldn't Be in Your Shoes	William Nigh	Don Castle, Elyse Knox, Regis Toomey	Film noir	Monogram
If You Knew Susie	Gordon Douglas	Eddie Cantor, Joan Davis, Allyn Joslyn	Comedy	RKO
In This Corner	Charles Reisner	Scott Brady, Anabel Shaw, James Millican	Drama	Eagle-Lion
Incident	William Beaudine	Jane Frazee, Joyce Compton, Warren Douglas	Crime	Monogram
Indian Agent	Lesley Selander	Tim Holt, Richard Martin, Nan Leslie	Western	RKO
Inner Sanctum	Lew Landers	Charles Russell, Mary Beth Hughes, Billy House	Film noir	Film Classics
An Innocent Affair	Lloyd Bacon	Fred MacMurray, Madeleine Carroll, Rita Johnson	Comedy	United Artists
The Inside Story	Allan Dwan	Marsha Hunt, William Lundigan, Charles Winninger	Comedy	Republic
The Iron Curtain	William A. Wellman	Dana Andrews, Gene Tierney, June Havoc	Thriller	20th Century Fox
Isn't It Romantic?	Norman Z. McLeod	Veronica Lake, Billy De Wolfe, Pearl Bailey	Romantic comedy	Paramount

== J ==
Title	Director	Cast	Genre	Notes
Jiggs and Maggie in Court	William Beaudine	Joe Yule, Renie Riano, George McManus	Comedy	Monogram
Jinx Money	William Beaudine	Leo Gorcey, Huntz Hall, Gabriel Dell	Comedy	Monogram
Joan of Arc	Victor Fleming	Ingrid Bergman, José Ferrer, Selena Royle	Historical	RKO; 7 Academy Award nominations
Joe Palooka in Fighting Mad	Reginald LeBorg	Joe Kirkwood Jr., Leon Errol, Elyse Knox	Sports	Monogram
Joe Palooka in Winner Take All	Reginald LeBorg	Joe Kirkwood Jr., Elyse Knox, Mary Beth Hughes	Sports	Monogram
Johnny Belinda	Jean Negulesco	Jane Wyman, Lew Ayres, Agnes Moorehead	Drama	Warner Bros. Academy Award for Wyman
Julia Misbehaves	Jack Conway	Greer Garson, Walter Pidgeon, Peter Lawford, Elizabeth Taylor	Comedy	MGM
June Bride	Bretaigne Windust	Bette Davis, Robert Montgomery, Fay Bainter	Comedy	Warner Bros.
Jungle Goddess	Lewis D. Collins	George Reeves, Wanda McKay, Ralph Byrd	Adventure	Lippert
Jungle Jim	William Berke	Johnny Weissmuller, Virginia Grey, Lita Baron	Adventure	Columbia
Jungle Patrol	Joseph M. Newman	Kristine Miller, Arthur Franz, Tommy Noonan	Adventure	20th Century Fox

== K ==
Title	Director	Cast	Genre	Notes
Key Largo	John Huston	Humphrey Bogart, Lauren Bacall, Edward G. Robinson	Film noir	Warner Bros.; Academy Award for Trevor
Kidnapped	William Beaudine	Roddy McDowall, Sue England, Dan O'Herlihy	Adventure	Monogram
King of the Gamblers	George Blair	Janet Martin, Thurston Hall, Stephanie Bachelor	Drama	Republic
Kiss the Blood Off My Hands	Norman Foster	Joan Fontaine, Burt Lancaster, Robert Newton	Film noir	Universal
The Kissing Bandit	Laslo Benedek	Frank Sinatra, Kathryn Grayson, J. Carrol Naish	Musical	MGM

== L ==
Title	Director	Cast	Genre	Notes
Lady at Midnight	Sam Newfield	Richard Denning, Frances Rafferty, Ralph Dunn	Mystery	Eagle-Lion
Larceny	George Sherman	John Payne, Joan Caulfield, Shelley Winters	Film noir	Universal
Last of the Wild Horses	Robert L. Lippert	James Ellison, Mary Beth Hughes, Jane Frazee	Western	Lippert
Leather Gloves	William Asher	Cameron Mitchell, Virginia Grey, Jane Nigh	Sports drama	Columbia
Let's Live Again	Herbert I. Leeds	Hillary Brooke, Diana Douglas, John Emery	Comedy	20th Century Fox
Let's Live a Little	Richard Wallace	Hedy Lamarr, Robert Cummings, Anna Sten	Comedy	Eagle-Lion
Letter from an Unknown Woman	Max Ophüls	Joan Fontaine, Louis Jourdan, Mady Christians	Drama	Universal
Lightnin' in the Forest	George Blair	Lynne Roberts, Warren Douglas, Lorna Gray	Comedy	Republic
Loaded Pistols	John English	Gene Autry, Barbara Britton, Jack Holt	Western	Columbia
The Loves of Carmen	Charles Vidor	Rita Hayworth, Glenn Ford, Ron Randell	Drama	Columbia; Remake of 1927 film
The Luck of the Irish	Henry Koster	Tyrone Power, Anne Baxter, Lee J. Cobb	Fantasy	20th Century Fox
Lulu Belle	Leslie Fenton	Dorothy Lamour, George Montgomery, Albert Dekker	Musical drama	Columbia
Luxury Liner	Richard Whorf	Jane Powell, George Brent, Frances Gifford	Comedy	MGM

== M ==
Title	Director	Cast	Genre	Notes
Macbeth	Orson Welles	Orson Welles, Jeanette Nolan, Dan O'Herlihy	Drama	Republic
Madonna of the Desert	George Blair	Lynne Roberts, Don Castle, Sheldon Leonard	Crime	Republic
The Main Street Kid	R. G. Springsteen	Al Pearce, Alan Mowbray, Adele Mara	Comedy	Republic
The Man from Colorado	Herry Levin	Glenn Ford, William Holden, Ellen Drew	Western	Columbia
The Man from Texas	Leigh Jason	James Craig, Lynn Bari, Johnnie Johnston	Western	Eagle-Lion
Man-Eater of Kumaon	Byron Haskin	Wendell Corey, Sabu, Joy Page	Adventure	Universal
Mark of the Lash	Ray Taylor	Lash La Rue, Al St. John, Marshall Reed	Western	Lippert
Marshal of Amarillo	Philip Ford	Allan Lane, Mildred Coles, Roy Barcroft	Western	Republic
Mary Lou	Arthur Dreifuss	Robert Lowery, Glenda Farrell, Joan Barton	Musical	Columbia
The Mating of Millie	Henry Levin	Evelyn Keyes, Glenn Ford, Ron Randell	Comedy	Columbia
Melody Time	Jack Kinney, Clyde Geronimi, Hamilton Luske	Roy Rogers, Frances Langford, Buddy Clark	Animation	Disney, RKO
Mexican Hayride	Charles Barton	Abbott and Costello, Virginia Grey, John Hubbard	Comedy	Universal
Michael O'Halloran	John Rawlins	Allene Roberts, Scotty Beckett, Isabel Jewell	Drama	Monogram
Mickey	Ralph Murphy	Irene Hervey, John Sutton, Hattie McDaniel	Comedy drama	Eagle-Lion
Million Dollar Weekend	Gene Raymond	Osa Massen, Gene Raymond, Francis Lederer	Film noir	Eagle-Lion
Miracle in Harlem	Jack Kemp	Sheila Guyse, Stepin Fetchit, Savannah Churchill	Mystery	Lippert
The Miracle of the Bells	Irving Pichel	Alida Valli, Fred MacMurray, Frank Sinatra	Drama	RKO
Miraculous Journey	Sam Newfield	Rory Calhoun, Virginia Grey, Audrey Long	Drama	Film Classics
Miss Tatlock's Millions	Richard Haydn	John Lund, Wanda Hendrix, Barry Fitzgerald	Comedy	Paramount
Money Madness	Sam Newfield	Hugh Beaumont, Frances Rafferty, Harlan Warde	Film noir	Film Classics
Moonrise	Frank Borzage	Gail Russell, Dane Clark, Ethel Barrymore	Film noir	Republic
Music Man	Will Jason	Freddie Stewart, June Preisser, Noel Neill	Musical comedy	Monogram
Mr. Blandings Builds His Dream House	H. C. Potter	Cary Grant, Myrna Loy, Melvyn Douglas	Comedy	RKO
Mr. Peabody and the Mermaid	Irving Pichel	William Powell, Ann Blyth, Andrea King	Comedy	Universal
Mr. Reckless	Frank McDonald	William Eythe, Barbara Britton, Minna Gombell	Drama	Paramount
My Dear Secretary	Charles Martin	Laraine Day, Kirk Douglas, Helen Walker	Comedy	United Artists
My Dog Rusty	Lew Landers	John Litel, Ann Doran, Mona Barrie	Drama	Columbia
My Girl Tisa	Elliott Nugent	Lilli Palmer, Sam Wanamaker, Akim Tamiroff	Drama	Warner Bros.
Mystery in Mexico	Robert Wise	William Lundigan, Jacqueline White, Ricardo Cortez	Thriller	RKO

== N ==
Title	Director	Cast	Genre	Notes
The Naked City	Jules Dassin	Barry Fitzgerald, Howard Duff, Dorothy Hart	Film noir	Universal
Night Has a Thousand Eyes	John Farrow	Edward G. Robinson, Gail Russell, John Lund	Horror	Paramount
Night Song	John Cromwell	Dana Andrews, Merle Oberon, Ethel Barrymore	Drama	RKO
Night Time in Nevada	William Witney	Roy Rogers, Adele Mara, Andy Devine	Western	Republic
Night Wind	James Tinling	Charles Russell, Virginia Christine, Gary Gray	Drama	20th Century Fox
No Minor Vices	Lewis Milestone	Dana Andrews, Lilli Palmer, Louis Jourdan	Comedy	MGM
The Noose Hangs High	Charles Barton	Abbott and Costello, Cathy Downs, Joseph Calleia	Comedy	Eagle-Lion
Northwest Stampede	Albert S. Rogell	Joan Leslie, James Craig, Jack Oakie	Western	Eagle-Lion

== O ==
Title	Director	Cast	Genre	Notes
Oklahoma Badlands	Yakima Canutt	Allan Lane, Eddy Waller, Mildred Coles	Western	Republic
Oklahoma Blues	Lambert Hillyer	Jimmy Wakely, Dub Taylor, Virginia Belmont	Western	Monogram
Old Los Angeles	Joseph Kane	Wild Bill Elliott, Catherine McLeod, John Carroll	Western	Republic
On an Island with You	Richard Thorpe	Esther Williams, Peter Lawford, Ricardo Montalbán	Comedy	MGM
One Sunday Afternoon	Raoul Walsh	Dennis Morgan, Janis Paige, Dorothy Malone	Musical	Warner Bros.
One Touch of Venus	William A. Seiter	Robert Walker, Ava Gardner, Eve Arden	Comedy	Universal
On Our Merry Way	King Vidor	Paulette Goddard, Dorothy Lamour, James Stewart	Comedy	United Artists
Open Secret	John Reinhardt	John Ireland, Jane Randolph, Roman Bohnen	Film noir	Eagle-Lion
Out of the Storm	R. G. Springsteen	Jimmy Lydon, Lois Collier, Marc Lawrence	Crime	Republic
Outlaw Brand	Lambert Hillyer	Jimmy Wakely, Dub Taylor, Kay Morley	Western	Monogram
Overland Trails	Lambert Hillyer	Johnny Mack Brown, Raymond Hatton, Virginia Belmont	Western	Monogram

== P–Q ==
Title	Director	Cast	Genre	Notes
The Paleface	Norman Z. McLeod	Bob Hope, Jane Russell, Robert Armstrong	Comedy western	Paramount
Panhandle	Lesley Selander	Rod Cameron, Cathy Downs, Anne Gwynne	Western	Allied Artists
Parole, Inc.	Alfred Zeisler	Michael O'Shea, Turhan Bey, Evelyn Ankers	Film noir	Eagle-Lion
Partners of the Sunset	Lambert Hillyer	Jimmy Wakely, Dub Taylor, Marshall Reed	Western	Monogram
Perilous Waters	Jack Bernhard	Don Castle, Audrey Long, Peggy Knudsen	Drama	Monogram
Phantom Valley	Ray Nazarro	Charles Starrett, Virginia Hunter, Smiley Burnette	Western	Columbia
The Pirate	Vincente Minnelli	Gene Kelly, Judy Garland, Walter Slezak	Musical	MGM
Pitfall	André de Toth	Dick Powell, Lizabeth Scott, Raymond Burr	Film noir	United Artists
The Plunderers	Joseph Kane	Rod Cameron, Ilona Massey, Lorna Gray	Western	Republic
Port Said	Reginald LeBorg	Gloria Henry, Steven Geray, William Bishop	Thriller	Columbia
Portrait of Jennie	William Dieterle	Jennifer Jones, Joseph Cotten, Ethel Barrymore	Romance	MGM
The Prince of Thieves	Howard Bretherton	Patricia Morison, Jon Hall, Adele Jergens	Adventure	Columbia
Quick on the Trigger	Ray Nazarro	Charles Starrett, Smiley Burnette, Lyle Talbot	Western	Columbia

== R ==
Title	Director	Cast	Genre	Notes
Race Street	Edwin L. Marin	George Raft, Marilyn Maxwell, William Bendix	Film noir	RKO
Rachel and the Stranger	Norman Foster	William Holden, Loretta Young, Robert Mitchum	Western	RKO
Racing Luck	William Berke	Gloria Henry, Stanley Clements, Paula Raymond	Drama	Columbia
Range Renegades	Lambert Hillyer	Jimmy Wakely, Dub Taylor, Jennifer Holt	Western	Monogram
The Rangers Ride	Derwin Abrahams	Jimmy Wakely, Dub Taylor, Virginia Belmont	Western	Monogram
Raw Deal	Anthony Mann	Dennis O'Keefe, Claire Trevor, Marsha Hunt	Film noir	Eagle-Lion
Red River	Howard Hawks	John Wayne, Montgomery Clift, Walter Brennan	Western	United Artists
Relentless	George Sherman	Robert Young, Marguerite Chapman, Akim Tamiroff	Western	Columbia
Renegades of Sonora	R. G. Springsteen	Allan Lane, Eddy Waller, Roy Barcroft	Western	Republic
Return of the Bad Men	Ray Enright	Randolph Scott, Robert Ryan, Anne Jeffreys	Western	RKO
The Return of October	Joseph H. Lewis	Glenn Ford, Terry Moore, James Gleason	Comedy	Columbia
The Return of the Whistler	D. Ross Lederman	Lenore Aubert, Dick Lane, James Cardwell	Film noir	Columbia
The Return of Wildfire	Ray Taylor	Richard Arlen, Patricia Morison, Mary Beth Hughes	Western	Lippert
River Lady	George Sherman	Yvonne De Carlo, Dan Duryea, Rod Cameron	Western	Universal
Road House	Jean Negulesco	Ida Lupino, Cornel Wilde, Richard Widmark	Film noir	20th Century Fox
Rocky	Phil Karlson, William Beaudine	Roddy McDowall, Gale Sherwood, Edgar Barrier	Drama	Monogram
Rogues' Regiment	Robert Florey	Dick Powell, Märta Torén, Vincent Price	Film noir	Universal
Romance on the High Seas	Michael Curtiz	Jack Carson, Janis Paige, Doris Day	Musical	Warner Bros.
Rope	Alfred Hitchcock	James Stewart, Farley Granger, John Dall	Film noir	Warner Bros.
Rusty Leads the Way	Will Jason	John Litel, Ann Doran, Paula Raymond	Drama	Columbia
Ruthless	Edgar G. Ulmer	Zachary Scott, Martha Vickers, Sydney Greenstreet	Film Noir	Eagle-Lion

== S ==
Title	Director	Cast	Genre	Notes
Saigon	Leslie Fenton	Alan Ladd, Veronica Lake, Douglas Dick	Film noir	Paramount
The Sainted Sisters	William D. Russell	Veronica Lake, Joan Caulfield, George Reeves	Comedy	Paramount
The Saxon Charm	Claude Binyon	Robert Montgomery, Susan Hayward, John Payne	Comedy, Drama	Universal
Scudda Hoo! Scudda Hay!	F. Hugh Herbert	June Haver, Lon McCallister, Walter Brennan	Comedy	20th Century Fox
Sealed Verdict	Lewis Allen	Ray Milland, Florence Marly, Broderick Crawford	Drama	Paramount
The Search	Fred Zinnemann	Montgomery Clift, Aline MacMahon, Jarmila Novotná	Drama	MGM
Secret Service Investigator	R. G. Springsteen	Lloyd Bridges, Lynne Roberts, George Zucco	Crime	Republic
Shaggy	Robert Emmett Tansey	Brenda Joyce, Robert Shayne, Jody Gilbert	Drama	Paramount
Shanghai Chest	William Beaudine	Roland Winters, Mantan Moreland, Victor Sen Yung	Mystery	Monogram. Charlie Chan
Shed No Tears	Jean Yarbrough	June Vincent, Wallace Ford, Frank Albertson	Film noir	Eagle-Lion
Shep Comes Home	Ford Beebe	Robert Lowery, Margia Dean, Michael Whalen	Drama	Lippert
The Sheriff of Medicine Bow	Lambert Hillyer	Johnny Mack Brown, Raymond Hatton, Evelyn Finley	Western	Monogram
The Sign of the Ram	John Sturges	Susan Peters, Alexander Knox, Phyllis Thaxter	Film noir	Columbia
Silent Conflict	George Archainbaud	William Boyd, Virginia Belmont, Andy Clyde	Western	United Artists
Silver River	Raoul Walsh	Errol Flynn, Ann Sheridan, Thomas Mitchell	Western	Warner Bros.
Silver Trails	Christy Cabanne	Jimmy Wakely, Dub Taylor, Christine Larson	Western	Monogram
Singin' Spurs	Ray Nazarro	Kirby Grant, Patricia Barry, Lee Patrick	Musical western	Columbia
Sinister Journey	George Archainbaud	William Boyd, Elaine Riley, Andy Clyde	Western	United Artists
Sitting Pretty	Walter Lang	Robert Young, Maureen O'Hara, Clifton Webb	Comedy	20th Century Fox
Six-Gun Law	Ray Nazarro	Charles Starrett, Nancy Saunders, Smiley Burnette	Western	Columbia
Sixteen Fathoms Deep	Irving Allen	Lloyd Bridges, Lon Chaney Jr., Tanis Chandler	Adventure	Monogram
Sleep, My Love	Douglas Sirk	Claudette Colbert, Don Ameche, Robert Cummings	Drama	United Artists
Slippy McGee	Albert H. Kelley	Don "Red" Barry, Dale Evans, Tom Brown	Crime	Republic
Smart Girls Don't Talk	Richard L. Bare	Virginia Mayo, Bruce Bennett, Robert Hutton	Crime	Warner Bros.
Smart Politics	Will Jason	June Preisser, Frankie Darro, Noel Neill	Musical	Monogram
Smart Woman	Edward A. Blatt	Constance Bennett, Brian Aherne, Barry Sullivan	Drama	Allied Artists
Smoky Mountain Melody	Ray Nazarro	Roy Acuff, Guinn "Big Boy" Williams, Russell Arms	Musical western	Columbia
Smugglers' Cove	William Beaudine	Leo Gorcey, Huntz Hall, Amelita Ward	Comedy	Monogram
The Snake Pit	Anatole Litvak	Olivia de Havilland, Leo Genn, Mark Stevens	Drama	20th Century Fox; 6 Oscar nominations
So Evil My Love	Lewis Allen	Ray Milland, Geraldine Fitzgerald, Ann Todd	Drama	Paramount
So This Is New York	Richard Fleischer	Henry Morgan, Rudy Vallee, Virginia Grey	Comedy	United Artists
Sofia	John Reinhardt	Gene Raymond, Patricia Morison, Sigrid Gurie	Drama	Film Classics
Son of God's Country	R. G. Springsteen	Monte Hale, Pamela Blake, Paul Hurst	Western	Republic
A Song Is Born	Howard Hawks	Danny Kaye, Virginia Mayo, Tommy Dorsey, Benny Goodman	Musical	RKO. Featuring The Golden Gate Quartet
Song of the Drifter	Lambert Hillyer	Jimmy Wakely, Dub Taylor, Mildred Coles	Western	Monogram
Song of Idaho	Ray Nazarro	Kirby Grant, June Vincent, Dorothy Vaughan	Western	Columbia
Song of My Heart	Benjamin Glazer	Audrey Long, Frank Sundström, Cedric Hardwicke	Biographical	Allied Artists
Sons of Adventure	Yakima Canutt	Lynne Roberts, Russell Hayden, Grant Withers	Western	Republic
Sorry, Wrong Number	Anatole Litvak	Barbara Stanwyck, Burt Lancaster, Ann Richards	Film noir	Paramount
A Southern Yankee	Edward Sedgwick	Red Skelton, Brian Donlevy, Arlene Dahl	Comedy western	MGM
Speed to Spare	William Berke	Richard Arlen, Jean Rogers, Richard Travis	Drama	Paramount
Stage Struck	William Nigh	Conrad Nagel, Kane Richmond, Audrey Long	Crime	Monogram
State of the Union	Frank Capra	Spencer Tracy, Katharine Hepburn, Van Johnson	Drama	MGM
Station West	Sidney Lanfield	Dick Powell, Jane Greer, Agnes Moorehead	Western	RKO
Strange Gamble	George Archainbaud	William Boyd, Elaine Riley, Rand Brooks	Western	United Artists
The Strange Mrs. Crane	Sam Newfield	Marjorie Lord, Robert Shayne, Pierre Watkin	Film noir	Eagle-Lion
The Strawberry Roan	John English	Gene Autry, Gloria Henry, Jack Holt	Western	Columbia
Street Corner	Albert H. Kelley	Johnny Duncan, Marcia Mae Jones, Eddie Gribbon	Drama	Independent
The Street with No Name	William Keighley	Mark Stevens, Richard Widmark, Lloyd Nolan	Film noir	20th Century Fox
Strike It Rich	Lesley Selander	Rod Cameron, Bonita Granville, Stuart Erwin	Comedy	Allied Artists
Summer Holiday	Rouben Mamoulian	Mickey Rooney, Gloria DeHaven, Frank Morgan	Musical	MGM
Sundown in Santa Fe	R. G. Springsteen	Allan Lane, Eddy Waller, Roy Barcroft	Western	Republic
Sunset Carson Rides Again	Oliver Drake	Sunset Carson, Dan White, Ron Ormond	Western	Astor
Sword of the Avenger	John Reinhardt	Sigrid Gurie, Ramon Delgado, Ralph Morgan	Adventure	Film Classics
The Swordsman	Joseph H. Lewis	Larry Parks, Ellen Drew, George Macready	Adventure	Columbia

== T ==
Title	Director	Cast	Genre	Notes
Tap Roots	George Marshall	Van Heflin, Susan Hayward, Julie London	Western	Universal
Tarzan and the Mermaids	Robert Florey	Johnny Weissmuller, Brenda Joyce, Linda Christian	Adventure	RKO
The Tender Years	Harold D. Schuster	Joe E. Brown, Noreen Nash, Charles Drake	Drama	20th Century Fox
Tenth Avenue Angel	Roy Rowland	Margaret O'Brien, Angela Lansbury, George Murphy	Drama	MGM
Texas, Brooklyn & Heaven	William Castle	Diana Lynn, Guy Madison, James Dunn	Romance	United Artists
That Lady in Ermine	Ernst Lubitsch	Betty Grable, Douglas Fairbanks Jr., Cesar Romero	Musical	20th Century Fox
That Wonderful Urge	Robert B. Sinclair	Tyrone Power, Gene Tierney, Reginald Gardiner	Comedy	20th Century Fox
They Live by Night	Nicholas Ray	Cathy O'Donnell, Farley Granger, Howard da Silva	Film noir	RKO
Three Daring Daughters	Fred M. Wilcox	Jeanette MacDonald, Jane Powell, Edward Arnold	Musical	MGM
The Three Musketeers	George Sidney	Gene Kelly, Van Heflin, Lana Turner, June Allyson	Adventure	MGM
Thunder in the Pines	Robert Gordon	George Reeves, Ralph Byrd, Michael Whalen	Western	Lippert
Thunderhoof	Phil Karlson	Preston Foster, Mary Stuart, William Bishop	Western	Columbia
The Tioga Kid	Ray Taylor	Eddie Dean, Roscoe Ates, Jennifer Holt	Western	Eagle-Lion
The Timber Trail	Philip Ford	Monte Hale, Lynne Roberts, Roy Barcroft	Western	Republic
The Time of Your Life	H. C. Potter	James Cagney, William Bendix, Wayne Morris	Comedy drama	United Artists; based on play by William Saroyan
To the Ends of the Earth	Robert Stevenson	Dick Powell, Signe Hasso, Ludwig Donath	Film noir	Columbia
To the Victor	Delmer Daves	Dennis Morgan, Viveca Lindfors, Victor Francen	Drama	Warner Bros.
Tornado Range	Ray Taylor	Eddie Dean, Roscoe Ates, Jennifer Holt	Western	Monogram
Trail to Laredo	Ray Nazarro	Charles Starrett, Smiley Burnette, Jim Bannon	Western	Columbia
Train to Alcatraz	Philip Ford	Don "Red" Barry, Janet Martin, Roy Barcroft	Action	Republic
Trapped by Boston Blackie	Seymour Friedman	Charles Marion, June Vincent, Patricia White	Mystery	Columbia
The Treasure of the Sierra Madre	John Huston	Humphrey Bogart, Walter Huston, Tim Holt, Bruce Bennett	Western	Warner Bros.; Oscars for both Hustons
Triggerman	Howard Bretherton	Johnny Mack Brown, Raymond Hatton, Virginia Carroll	Western	Monogram
Triple Threat	Jean Yarbrough	Gloria Henry, Mary Stuart, Richard Crane	Drama	Columbia
Trouble Makers	Reginald LeBorg	Leo Gorcey, Huntz Hall, Helen Parrish	Comedy	Monogram
Trouble Preferred	James Tinling	Peggy Knudsen, Lynne Roberts, Charles Russell	Drama	20th Century Fox
Two Guys from Texas	David Butler	Dennis Morgan, Jack Carson, Dorothy Malone	Musical comedy	Warner Bros.

== U–V ==
Title	Director	Cast	Genre	Notes
Under California Stars	William Witney	Roy Rogers, Jane Frazee, Andy Devine	Western	Republic
Unfaithfully Yours	Preston Sturges	Rex Harrison, Linda Darnell, Rudy Vallée, Barbara Lawrence	Black comedy	20th Century Fox; remade in 1984
Unknown Island	Jack Bernhard	Virginia Grey, Phillip Reed, Richard Denning	Sci-fi	Film Classics
The Untamed Breed	Charles Lamont	Sonny Tufts, Barbara Britton, George "Gabby" Hayes	Western	Columbia
Up in Central Park	William A. Seiter	Deanna Durbin, Dick Haymes, Vincent Price	Comedy	Universal
The Valiant Hombre	Wallace Fox	Duncan Renaldo, Leo Carrillo, Barbara Billingsley	Western	United Artists
The Velvet Touch	Jack Gage	Rosalind Russell, Leo Genn, Claire Trevor	Film noir	RKO
The Vicious Circle	W. Lee Wilder	Conrad Nagel, Fritz Kortner, Philip Van Zandt	Drama	United Artists

== W–Z ==
Title	Director	Cast	Genre	Notes
Wake of the Red Witch	Edward Ludwig	John Wayne, Gail Russell, Gig Young	Adventure	Republic
Walk a Crooked Mile	Gordon Douglas	Dennis O'Keefe, Louis Hayward, Louise Allbritton	Film noir	Columbia
Wallflower	Fred de Cordova	Robert Hutton, Joyce Reynolds, Janis Paige	Comedy	Warner Bros.
The Walls of Jericho	John M. Stahl	Cornel Wilde, Anne Baxter, Kirk Douglas	Drama	20th Century Fox
Waterfront at Midnight	William Berke	Mary Beth Hughes, William Gargan, Richard Crane	Crime	Paramount
West of Sonora	Ray Nazarro	Charles Starrett, Smiley Burnette, Steve Darrell	Western	Columbia
Western Heritage	Wallace Grissell	Tim Holt, Richard Martin, Lois Andrews	Western	RKO
The Westward Trail	Ray Taylor	Eddie Dean, Roscoe Ates, Carl Mathews	Western	Eagle-Lion
When My Baby Smiles at Me	Walter Lang	Betty Grable, Dan Dailey, Jack Oakie, June Havoc	Musical	20th Century Fox
Whiplash	Lewis Seiler	Dane Clark, Zachary Scott, Eve Arden	Western	Warner Bros.
Whirlwind Raiders	Vernon Keays	Charles Starrett, Nancy Saunders	Western	Columbia
Whispering Smith	Leslie Fenton	Alan Ladd, Robert Preston, Brenda Marshall	Western	Paramount
Who Killed Doc Robbin	Bernard Carr	Larry Casey, Virginia Grey, George Zucco	Comedy	United Artists
The Winner's Circle	Felix E. Feist	Jean Willes, Morgan Farley, Johnny Longden	Drama	20th Century Fox
Winter Meeting	Bretaigne Windust	Bette Davis, Janis Paige, John Hoyt	Drama	Warner Bros.
A Woman's Vengeance	Zoltan Korda	Charles Boyer, Ann Blyth, Jessica Tandy	Film noir	Universal
The Woman from Tangier	Harold Daniels	Adele Jergens, Stephen Dunne, Donna Martell	Thriller	Columbia
The Woman in White	Peter Godfrey	Alexis Smith, Eleanor Parker, Sydney Greenstreet	Drama	Warner Bros.
Women in the Night	William Rowland	Tala Birell, Bernadene Hayes, Virginia Christine	Drama	Film Classics
Words and Music	Norman Taurog	Mickey Rooney, Janet Leigh, Betty Garrett, June Allyson, Gene Kelly, Perry Como	Musical	MGM
The Wreck of the Hesperus	John Hoffman	Patricia Barry, Willard Parker, Holmes Herbert	Adventure	Columbia
Yellow Sky	William A. Wellman	Gregory Peck, Richard Widmark, Anne Baxter	Western	20th Century Fox
You Gotta Stay Happy	H. C. Potter	Joan Fontaine, James Stewart, Eddie Albert	Romantic comedy	Universal
You Were Meant for Me	Lloyd Bacon	Dan Dailey, Jeanne Crain, Barbara Lawrence	Musical	20th Century Fox

== Documentaries ==
Title	Director	Cast	Genre	Notes
Louisiana Story	Robert J. Flaherty		Docudrama	nominated for Academy Award
Test Tube Babies	W. Merle Connell		Exploitation	

== Serials ==
Title	Director	Cast	Genre	Notes
Adventures of Frank and Jesse James	Yakima Canutt	Clayton Moore, Noel Neill	Western, Serial	Republic
Congo Bill	Spencer Gordon Bennet, Thomas Carr	Don McGuire, Cleo Moore	Adventure, Serial	Columbia
Dangers of the Canadian Mounted	Fred C. Brannon, Yakima Canutt	Jim Bannon	Adventure, Serial	Republic
G–Men Never Forget	Fred C. Brannon, Yakima Canutt	Clayton Moore	Crime, Serial	Republic
Superman	Spencer Gordon Bennet, Thomas Carr	Kirk Alyn, Noel Neill	Serial	Columbia
Tex Granger	Derwin Abrahams	Robert Kellard	Western, Serial	Columbia

== Shorts ==
Title	Director	Cast	Genre	Notes
A-Lad-In His Lamp	Robert McKimson	Bugs Bunny	Animated	Warner Bros.
Bill and Coo	Dean Riesner		Nature	Republic
Bob and Sally	Erle C. Kenton		Educational	Universal
Buccaneer Bunny	Friz Freleng	Bugs Bunny	Animated short	Warner Bros.
Bugs Bunny Rides Again	Friz Freleng	Bugs Bunny	Animated short	Warner Bros.
The Chicken of Tomorrow	Patrick Allen	Lowell Thomas	short	Industrial film
A Feather in His Hare	Chuck Jones		Animated short	Warner Bros.
Fiddlers Three	Jules White	The Three Stooges	Comedy short	Columbia
Gorilla My Dreams	Robert McKimson	Looney Tunes	Animated short	Warner Bros.
Haredevil Hare	Chuck Jones	Looney Tunes	Animated short	Warner Bros.
Hatch Up Your Troubles	Hanna-Barbera	Tom and Jerry	Animated short	MGM
Hop, Look and Listen	Robert McKimson	Looney Tunes	Animated short	Warner Bros.
Hot Cross Bunny	Robert McKimson	Bugs Bunny	Animated short	Warner Bros.
I Taw a Putty Tat	Friz Freleng		Animated short	Warner Bros.
Kitty Foiled	Hanna-Barbera		Animated short	MGM
Mouse Cleaning	Hanna-Barbera		Animated short	MGM
My Bunny Lies over the Sea	Charles M. Jones		Animated short	Warner Bros.
Old Rockin' Chair Tom	Hanna-Barbera		Animated short	MGM
Polka-Dot Puss	Hanna-Barbera		Animated short	MGM
Professor Tom	Hanna-Barbera	Tom and Jerry	Animated short	MGM
Scaredy Cat	Charles M. Jones		Animated short	Warner Bros.
Tea for Two Hundred	Jack Hannah	Donald Duck	Animated short	Walt Disney Productions
The Truce Hurts	Hanna-Barbera		Animated short	MGM
Three for Breakfast	Jack Hannah	Donald Duck	Animated short	Walt Disney Productions

== See also ==
- 1948 in the United States
