= Cecil Cunningham =

American actress (1888–1959)

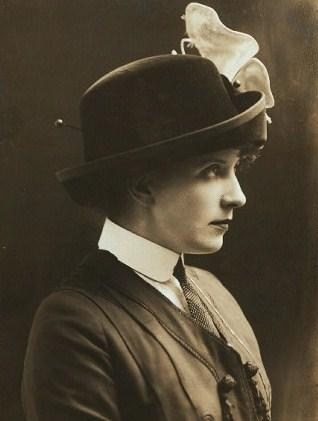
- Cunningham in 1912
- Born: Edna Cecil Cunningham; August 2, 1888; St. Louis, Missouri, U.S.
- Died: April 17, 1959 (aged 70); Los Angeles, California, U.S.
- Resting place: Chapel Of The Pines Crematory
- Education: The Humboldt School, Central High School
- Occupations: Stage and film actress, singer, dancer, comedian
- Years active: 1906–1957
- Spouse: Jean C. Havez (1915–1918) (divorced)

Edna Cecil Cunningham (August 2, 1888 – April 17, 1959) was an American film and stage actress, singer, and comedienne.

== Early years ==
Cunningham was born in St. Louis, Missouri, one of at least six children of Sarah Hunter and Patrick Henry Cunningham. Her father was a onetime Major League outfielder for the original St. Louis Browns. In St. Louis, she attended the Humboldt School and Central High School.

Cunningham's early experience in music came as a member of the choir in the Fifth Baptist Church. In the fall of 1903, at the age of fifteen, Cunningham was also said to have "taken a deep interest in the prisoners at the city jail," performing for their benefit at religious services every Sunday. Moreover, reported the St. Louis Republic, these efforts had earned her an uncommon display of gratitude on the part of several inmates.

Cunningham [...] yesterday afternoon received from Edward Phiester and Joseph Spray a mimic ship on which they and several other inmates have been working for two weeks. The ship is constructed of cloth, tinsel and whalebones, in imitation of a transatlantic liner. On the masts, suspended by golden threads, are Miss Cunningham's initials in gold. At the close of services yesterday, Spray and Phiester presented the ship to Miss Cunningham, at the same time telling her that the miniature was a token of their appreciation for her efforts to enliven their existence by her singing.

== Career ==
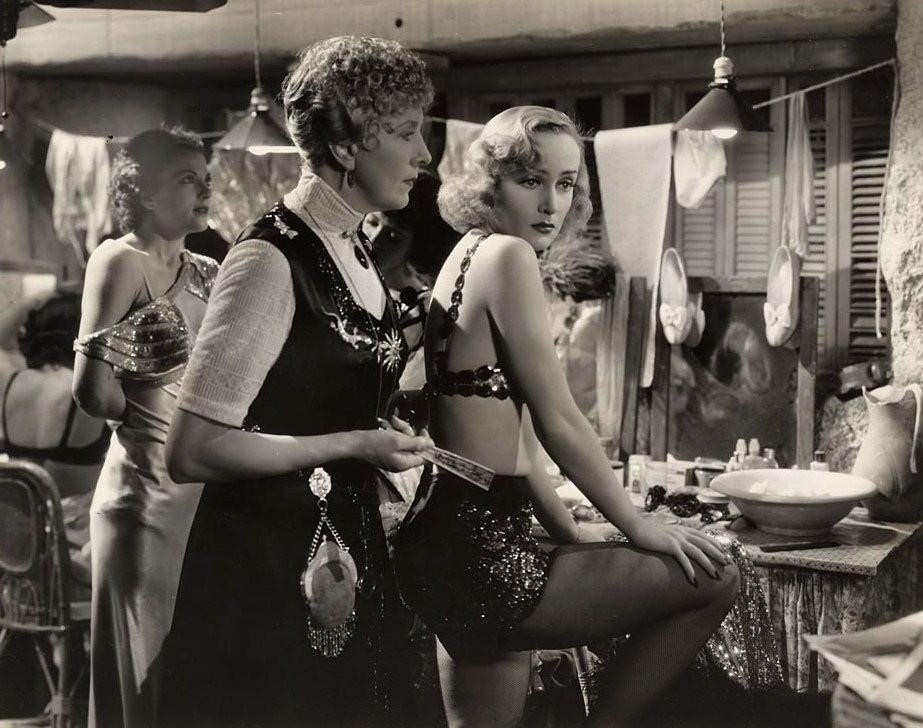
Cunningham (middle) with Carole Lombard in Swing High, Swing Low (1937)

Cunningham's first show business job was in the chorus line of Mlle. Modiste at the age of 18. She trained as a singer and appeared in opera. She worked as a vaudeville comedian at the Palace Theatre in New York City until the commencement of her movie career in 1929.

Cunningham's Broadway credits include Somewhere Else (1913), Iolanthe (1913), Oh, I Say! (1913), Maids of Athens (1914), Dancing Around (1914), Greenwich Village Follies (1919), The Rose of China (1919), and Dance With Your Gods (1934). She also performed in Paris with the Boston Grand Opera Company, singing in Italian operas.

Cunningham was a Hollywood character actress with whitish hair cut like a man's, often in roles as a general "know-it-all". She made more than 80 appearances in movies from 1929 to 1946, many of them uncredited.

== Personal life ==
Cunningham was married to writer Jean C. Havez from 1915 to 1918.

== Death ==
On April 17, 1959, Cunningham died of heart disease at the Motion Picture Country Hospital in Woodland Hills, California. She was 70 years old. Her remains are interred in Chapel of the Pines Crematory.

== Complete filmography ==
- Their Own Desire (1929) – Aunt Caroline
- Paramount on Parade (1930) – Society Woman (Impulses) (uncredited)
- Anybody's Woman (1930) – Dot
- Playboy of Paris (1930) – Mlle. Hedwige
- Trouble from Abroad (1931, Short) – Emma Wimple
- Monkey Business (1931) – Madame Swempski (uncredited)
- Susan Lenox (Her Fall and Rise) (1931) – Madame Panoramia a.k.a. Pansy
- The Age for Love (1931) – Pamela
- Safe in Hell (1931) – Angie
- Mata Hari (1931) – Gambler Selling Ring (uncredited)
- Never the Twins Shall Meet (1932, Short) – Mrs. Carp
- Impatient Maiden (1932) – Mrs. Rosy
- The Wet Parade (1932) – Mrs. Twombey - Hotel Guest (uncredited)
- It's Tough to Be Famous (1932) – Autograph Seeker with Sheet Music (uncredited)
- Just a Pain in the Parlor (1932, Short) – Mrs. Smith
- The Rich Are Always with Us (1932) – Woman Talking to Tierney at Party (uncredited)
- Love Is a Racket (1932) – Aunt Hattie Donovan
- Is My Face Red? (1932) – Millionaire's Blonde Wife (uncredited)
- The Candid Camera (1932, Short) – Mrs. Townes' Aunty
- Love Me Tonight (1932) – Laundress (uncredited)
- Those We Love (1932) – Mrs. Henry Abbott
- Blonde Venus (1932) – Norfolk Woman Manager (uncredited)
- If I Had a Million (1932) – Agnes - Emily's Friend (uncredited)
- Ladies They Talk About (1933) – Mrs. Arlington (uncredited)
- From Hell to Heaven (1933) – Mrs. Chadman
- The Druggist's Dilemma (1933, Short) – Mrs. Finch
- Bottoms Up (1934) – Party Guest (uncredited)
- Manhattan Love Song (1934) – Pancake Annie Jones
- The Life of Vergie Winters (1934) – Pearl Turner
- Return of the Terror (1934) – Miss Doolittle
- We Live Again (1934) – Theodosia (uncredited)
- People Will Talk (1935) – Nellie Simpson
- Mr. Deeds Goes to Town (1936) – Minor Role (uncredited)
- Come and Get It (1936) – Josie
- Swing High, Swing Low (1937) – Murphy
- King of Gamblers (1937) – Big Edna
- Artists and Models (1937) – Stella
- This Way Please (1937) – Miss Eberhardt
- The Awful Truth (1937) – Mrs. Alvin
- Daughter of Shanghai (1937) – Mrs. Mary Hunt
- Scandal Street (1938) – Maybelle Murphy
- Four Men and a Prayer (1938) – Piper
- College Swing (1938) – Dean Sleet
- Kentucky Moonshine (1938) – Landlady
- You and Me (1938) – Mrs. Morris
- Wives Under Suspicion (1938) – "Sharpy"
- Blond Cheat (1938) – Genevieve Trent
- Marie Antoinette (1938) – Mme. "Feldy" de Lerchenfeld (uncredited)
- Girls' School (1938) – Miss Brewster
- The Family Next Door (1939) – Cora Stewart
- It's a Wonderful World (1939) – Madame J.L. Chambers
- Winter Carnival (1939) – Miss Ainsley
- Lady of the Tropics (1939) – Countess Berichi
- Laugh It Off (1939) – Tess Gibson
- Abe Lincoln in Illinois (1940) – Minor Role (uncredited)
- Lillian Russell (1940) – Mrs. Hobbs
- The Captain Is a Lady (1940) – Mrs. Jane Homans
- New Moon (1940) – Governor's Wife
- Kitty Foyle (1940) – Grandmother
- Tall, Dark and Handsome (1941) – Frosty's Landlady (uncredited)
- Play Girl (1941) – Dowager (uncredited)
- Back Street (1941) – Mrs. Miller
- Repent at Leisure (1941) – Mrs. Morgan
- Hurry, Charlie, Hurry (1941) – Mrs. Diana Boone
- Blossoms in the Dust (1941) – Mrs. Gilworth
- The Feminine Touch (1941) – Party Guest (uncredited)
- Cowboy Serenade (1942) – Priscilla Smythe
- The Wife Takes a Flyer (1942) – Countess Oldenburg
- Twin Beds (1942) – Miss MacMahon, Secretary (uncredited)
- Are Husbands Necessary? (1942) – Miss Jenkins
- The Affairs of Martha (1942) – Mrs. Llewellyn Castle
- I Married an Angel (1942) – Mrs. Fairmind (uncredited)
- Cairo (1942) – Mme. Laruga
- The Hidden Hand (1942) – Lorinda Channing
- My Heart Belongs to Daddy (1942) – Mrs. Whitman (uncredited)
- Above Suspicion (1943) – Countess
- In Old Oklahoma (1943) – Mrs. Ames
- The Horn Blows at Midnight (1945) – Judge Cavendish (scenes deleted)
- Wonder Man (1945) – Fortune Teller (uncredited)
- My Reputation (1946) – Mrs. Stella Thompson
- The Bride Goes Wild (1948) – Helen Oldfield (scenes deleted)
- Joyful Hour (1960, TV movie) – Elizabeth
