= Mildred Coles =

Mildred Coles may refer to:

- Mildred Coles (tennis) (1876–1937), British tennis player
- Mildred Coles (actress) (1920–1995), American actress
