= Lady Scarface =

1941 film by Frank Woodruff

- Directed by: Frank Woodruff
- Screenplay by: Arnaud d'Usseau; Richard Collins
- Produced by: Cliff Reid
- Starring: Dennis O'Keefe; Judith Anderson; Mildred Coles
- Cinematography: Nicholas Musuraca
- Edited by: Harry Marker
- Music by: Dave Dreyer
- Production company: RKO Radio Pictures
- Distributed by: RKO Radio Pictures
- Release date: September 26, 1941
- Running time: 66 minutes
- Country: United States
- Language: English

Lady Scarface is a 1941 American crime drama film directed by Frank Woodruff and starring Dennis O'Keefe, Judith Anderson, and Mildred Coles. It was produced and distributed by RKO Pictures.

== Plot ==
The scar-faced gangster Slade is on the loose. Lieutenant Bill Mason travels to a hotel in New York to try and track her down. In New York Lt. Mason works together with Lt. Onslow and the crime reporter Ann Rogers to catch Slade, under the assumption that she is a man. An innocent couple at the hotel inadvertently gets involved.

== Cast ==
- Dennis O'Keefe as Lt. Bill Mason
- Judith Anderson as Slade
- Frances E. Neal as Ann Rogers
- Mildred Coles as Mary Jordan Powell
- Eric Blore as Mr. Hartford
- Marc Lawrence as Lefty Landers
- Damian O'Flynn as Lt. Onslow
- Andrew Tombes as Art Seidel, hotel detective
- Marion Martin as Ruby, aka Mary Jordan
- Arthur Shields as Matt Willis
- Rand Brooks as James 'Jimmy' Powell
- Lee Bonnell as George Atkins
- Harry Burns as Big 'Sem' Semenoff

== Bibliography ==
- Fetrow, Alan G. Feature Films, 1940-1949: a United States Filmography. McFarland, 1994.
