= Gene Perret =

American comedy writer and producer (1937–2022)

Gene Perret (April 3, 1937 – November 15, 2022) was an American comedy writer and producer. He won three Emmys for his work on The Carol Burnett Show. He worked for Bob Hope for 28 years. He wrote Hope’s television specials and USO Christmas tours. Perret died from liver failure on November 15, 2022, at the age of 85. He is interred at Valley Oaks Memorial Park.
