= Here Comes Happiness =

1941 film by Noel M. Smith

- Theatrical release poster
- Directed by: Noel M. Smith
- Screenplay by: Charles L. Tedford
- Story by: Harry Sauber
- Produced by: William Jacobs
- Starring: Mildred Coles; Edward Norris; Richard Ainley; Russell Hicks; Marjorie Gateson; John Ridgely
- Cinematography: James Van Trees
- Edited by: Harold McLernon
- Music by: Howard Jackson
- Production company: Warner Bros. Pictures
- Distributed by: Warner Bros. Pictures
- Release date: March 15, 1941
- Running time: 57 minutes
- Country: United States
- Language: English

Here Comes Happiness is a 1941 American comedy film directed by Noel M. Smith and written by Charles L. Tedford. The film stars Mildred Coles, Edward Norris, Richard Ainley, Russell Hicks, Marjorie Gateson and John Ridgely. The film was released by Warner Bros. Pictures on March 15, 1941.

== Plot ==
A rich heiress Jessica (Mildred Coles), tired of being romantically pursued for her money, abandons her wealthy environment to find a suitable partner as a working-class girl. In her new blue collar lifestyle, she falls in love with Chet (Edward Norris), an ambitious sandblaster attempting to rise up from his working class circumstances.

A series of misunderstandings ensue as Chet begins to suspect Jessica is not the innocent waif she appears to be, mistaking her secret meetings with her father (Russell Hicks) as a romantic relationship with a rich older man. Complications ensue until the misunderstandings eventually clear up, allowing them to reveal their genuine love for each other.

== Cast ==
- Mildred Coles as Jessica Vance
- Edward Norris as Chet Madden
- Richard Ainley as Jelliffe Blaine
- Russell Hicks as John Vance
- Marjorie Gateson as Emily Vance
- John Ridgely as Jim
- Eddie Acuff as Bill
- Lucia Carroll as Peg
- Helen Lynd as Flo
- Marie Blake as Clara
- Edward Gargan as Joe
- Vera Lewis as Mrs. James
- Joseph Crehan as Tom Burke
- Ann Edmonds as Miss Barnes
- William Hopper as Best Man
