= Curtain Call (1940 film) =

1940 film by Frank Woodruff

- Original theatrical poster
- Directed by: Frank Woodruff
- Screenplay by: Dalton Trumbo
- Story by: Howard J. Green
- Produced by: Howard Benedict
- Starring: Barbara Read; Alan Mowbray; Helen Vinson; Donald MacBride; John Archer
- Cinematography: Russell Metty
- Edited by: Harry Marker
- Music by: Roy Webb
- Production company: RKO Radio Pictures
- Distributed by: RKO Radio Pictures
- Release date: April 26, 1940 (US)
- Running time: 63 minutes
- Country: United States
- Language: English

Curtain Call is a 1940 comedy, directed by Frank Woodruff and starring Barbara Read, Helen Vinson, Alan Mowbray and Donald MacBride. The film was followed by a sequel, Footlight Fever, released in 1941.

== Plot ==
Two theatrical producers plan to get even with a demanding actress by tricking her into starring in the worst play they can find. The producer and director conspire to give the actress a dreadful role to play from the script of The End of Everything. The plot to mislead the actress, however, backfires when she loves the role and gives a stellar performance, which turns the play into a hit.

== Cast ==
- Barbara Read as Helen Middleton
- Alan Mowbray as Donald Avery
- Helen Vinson as Charlotte Morley
- Donald MacBride as Geoffrey "Jeff" Crandall
- John Archer as Ted Palmer
- Leona Maricle as Miss "Smitty" Smith
- Frank Faylen as Spike Malone
- Tom Kennedy as Massage Attendant
- Ralph Forbes as Leslie Barrivale
- J. M. Kerrigan as Mr. Middleton
- Ann Shoemaker as Mrs. Middleton
- Tommy Kelly as Fred "Freddy" Middleton
