= Sleepytime Gal =

1942 film by Albert S. Rogell

- Theatrical release poster
- Directed by: Albert S. Rogell
- Screenplay by: Art Arthur; Albert Duffy; Max Lief
- Story by: Mauri Grashin; Robert T. Shannon
- Produced by: Albert J. Cohen
- Starring: Judy Canova; Tom Brown; Billy Gilbert; Ruth Terry; Thurston Hall; Elisha Cook Jr. Jerry Lester; Mildred Coles; Harold Huber
- Cinematography: Jack A. Marta
- Edited by: Ernest J. Nims
- Music by: Mort Glickman
- Production company: Republic Pictures
- Distributed by: Republic Pictures
- Release date: March 5, 1942
- Running time: 84 minutes
- Country: United States
- Language: English

Sleepytime Gal is a 1942 American comedy film directed by Albert S. Rogell and written by Art Arthur, Albert Duffy and Max Lief. The film stars Judy Canova, Tom Brown, Billy Gilbert, Ruth Terry, Thurston Hall, Elisha Cook Jr., Jerry Lester, Mildred Coles and Harold Huber. It was released on March 5, 1942 by Republic Pictures.

== Cast ==
- Judy Canova as Bessie Cobb
- Tom Brown as Chick Patterson
- Billy Gilbert as Chef Popodopolis
- Ruth Terry as Sugar Caston
- Thurston Hall as Mr. Adams
- Elisha Cook Jr. as Ernie
- Jerry Lester as Downbeat
- Mildred Coles as Connie Thompson
- Harold Huber as Honest Joe Kincaid
- Fritz Feld as Chef Petrovich
- Frank Sully as Dimples
- Jimmy Ames as Gus
- Jay Novello as Chef Barzumium
- Skinnay Ennis as Danny Marlowe
- Paul Fix as Johnny Gatto
