= Black Eagle (1948 film) =

1948 film by Robert Gordon

- Film poster
- Directed by: Robert Gordon
- Written by: Edward Huebsch (adaptation)
- Screenplay by: Edward Huebsch; Harold Jacob Smith (as Hal Smith)
- Based on: O. Henry (story "The Passing of Black Eagle")
- Produced by: Robert Cohn
- Starring: William Bishop; Virginia Patton; Gordon Jones; James Bell
- Cinematography: Henry Freulich
- Edited by: James Sweeney
- Production company: Columbia Pictures
- Distributed by: Columbia Pictures
- Release date: September 16, 1948
- Running time: 76 minutes
- Country: United States
- Language: English

Black Eagle is a 1948 American Western film directed by Robert Gordon and starring William Bishop, Virginia Patton, Gordon Jones and James Bell. It is based on the 1909 short story, The Passing of Black Eagle by O. Henry.

== Plot ==
A tramp steals a ride in a horsebox, and becomes involved in the fight of the horse's owner against a crooked stock dealer.

== Cast ==
- William Bishop as Jason Bond
- Virginia Patton as Ginny Long
- Gordon Jones as Benji Laughton
- James Bell as Frank Hayden
- Trevor Bardette as Mike Long
- Will Wright as Sheriff Claney
- Edmund MacDonald as Si
- Paul E. Burns as Hank Daniels (as Paul Burns)

== See also ==
- List of American films of 1948
