= Hurry, Charlie, Hurry =

1941 American comedy film

- Movie poster
- Directed by: Charles E. Roberts
- Screenplay by: Paul Gerard Smith
- Story by: Luke Short
- Produced by: Howard Benedict
- Starring: Leon Errol; Mildred Coles; Kenneth Howell; Cecil Cunningham; George Watts
- Cinematography: Nicholas Musuraca
- Edited by: George Hively
- Production company: RKO Pictures
- Distributed by: RKO Pictures
- Release date: June 13, 1941
- Running time: 65 minutes
- Country: United States
- Language: English

Hurry, Charlie, Hurry is a 1941 American comedy film directed by Charles E. Roberts and written by Paul Gerard Smith. The film stars Leon Errol, Mildred Coles, Kenneth Howell, Cecil Cunningham and George Watts. The film was released on June 13, 1941, by RKO Pictures.

== Plot ==
A banker urges his daughter to elope and pretends to know the U.S. vice president, Mr. Quimby.

== Cast ==
- Leon Errol as Daniel Jennings Boone
- Mildred Coles as Beatrice Boone
- Kenneth Howell as Jerry Grant
- Cecil Cunningham as Mrs. Diana Boone
- George Watts as Horace Morris
- Eddie Conrad as Wagon Track
- Noble Johnson as Chief Poison Arrow
- Douglas Walton as Michael Prescott
- Renee Godfrey as Josephine Whitley
- Georgia Caine as Mrs. Georgia Whitley
- Lalo Encinas as Frozen Foot
- Grady Sutton as the tailor (uncredited)
