= Scattergood Meets Broadway =

1941 film by Christy Cabanne

- Theatrical release poster
- Directed by: Christy Cabanne
- Screenplay by: Michael L. Simmons; Ethel B. Stone
- Story by: Michael L. Simmons
- Produced by: Jerrold T. Brandt
- Starring: Guy Kibbee; Mildred Coles; William "Bill" Henry; Emma Dunn; Frank Jenks; Joyce Compton; Bradley Page
- Cinematography: Jack MacKenzie
- Edited by: John Sturges
- Music by: Dimitri Tiomkin
- Production company: Pyramid Productions
- Distributed by: RKO Radio Pictures
- Release date: August 22, 1941
- Running time: 68 minutes
- Country: United States
- Language: English

Scattergood Meets Broadway is a 1941 American comedy film directed by Christy Cabanne and written by Michael L. Simmons and Ethel B. Stone. It is the sequel to the 1941 film Scattergood Pulls the Strings. The film stars Guy Kibbee, Mildred Coles, William "Bill" Henry, Emma Dunn, Frank Jenks, Joyce Compton and Bradley Page. The film was released on August 22, 1941, by RKO Pictures.

== Plot ==
Scattergood loans some money to his neighbor, Elly Drew, who was going to sell her home in order to support her son David, an aspiring playwright who is in New York City trying to get his play produced. He also decides to go visit New York to see how David was doing and finds out finds out that things aren't quite as rosy as they seem.

== Cast ==
- Guy Kibbee as Scattergood Baines
- Mildred Coles as Peggy Gibson
- William "Bill" Henry as David Drew
- Emma Dunn as Mirandy Baines
- Frank Jenks as J. J. Bent
- Joyce Compton as Diana Deane
- Bradley Page as H. C. Bard
- Chester Clute as Quentin Van Deusen
- Morgan Wallace as Reynolds
- Carl Stockdale as Squire Pettibone
- Charlotte Walker as Elly Drew
- Paul White as Hipp
- Don Brodie as Waiter
- Herbert Rawlinson as The Governor

== Bibliography ==
- Erickson, Hal. From Radio to the Big Screen: Hollywood Films Featuring Broadcast Personalities and Programs. McFarland, 2014.
- Fetrow, Alan G. Feature Films, 1940-1949: a United States Filmography. McFarland, 1994.
