= The Lucky Stiff =

1949 film by Lewis R. Foster

- Theatrical release poster
- Directed by: Lewis R. Foster
- Screenplay by: Lewis R. Foster
- Based on: the novel The Lucky Stiff by Craig Rice
- Produced by: Jack Benny; William T. Lackey
- Starring: Dorothy Lamour; Brian Donlevy; Claire Trevor
- Cinematography: Ernest Laszlo
- Edited by: Howard A. Smith
- Music by: Heinz Roemheld
- Production company: Amusement Enterprises
- Distributed by: United Artists
- Release dates: January 22, 1949 (New York City, New York); May 26, 1949 (United States)
- Running time: 99 minutes
- Country: United States
- Language: English
- Budget: $750,000

The Lucky Stiff is a 1949 American comedy crime film directed by Lewis R. Foster, starring Dorothy Lamour, Brian Donlevy, and Claire Trevor. The film is based on the 1945 novel of the same name by Craig Rice.

The Lucky Stiff was produced by famous comedian Jack Benny, the only feature film he ever produced, through his production company, Amusement Enterprises.

== Plot ==
Lawyer John Malone (Donlevy) is an ardent admirer of the sultry night-club singer Anna Marie St. Clair (Lamour). After meeting her at the club, he is present when her boss is killed, and she is arrested for the crime. Anna Marie is sentenced to death, so Malone and his secretary Maggie Seaton (Trevor) set out to find the real murderer, who is probably also responsible for a protection racket Malone is investigating.

At the last possible moment, Anna Marie is saved from execution. When she learns that the newspapers have reported that she is dead, she decides to use her status as a "corpse" to her advantage. Millie Dale, her replacement at the nightclub, is also killed. Malone concludes that nightclub owner Eddie Britt has been behind the scheme all along but that Anna Marie, in love with Britt, was also complicit. Police inspector Von Flanagan ends up placing Anna Marie back under arrest, while Malone places a kiss on Maggie.

== Cast ==
- Dorothy Lamour as Anna Marie St. Claire
- Brian Donlevy as John J. Malone
- Claire Trevor as Marguerite "Maggie" Seaton
- Irene Hervey as Mrs. Childers
- Marjorie Rambeau as Hattie Hatfield
- Robert Armstrong as Inspector Von Flanagan
- Warner Anderson as Eddie Britt
- Virginia Patton as Millie Dale
- Richard Gaines as District Attorney Logan
- Joe Sawyer as Tony
- Larry J. Blake as Louie Perez
- Billy Vine as Joe "The Angel" Di Angelo
- Bob Hopkins as MacDougal
- Sidney Miller as Bernstein
- Charles Meredith as Mr. Childers
- Jimmy Ames as Rico Di Angelo

== Production history ==
Craig Rice turned many of her novels into films, including Having Wonderful Crime (1945) and Home Sweet Homicide (1946). “The Lucky Stiff,” which was released in 1945, was another addition to the hit mystery series that included the famous character, John J. Malone. Lewis R. Foster wrote and directed the movie, Ernest Laszlo was cinematographer, and the film was edited by Howard Smith. Furthermore, Lewis H. Creber was the art director, Alfred Kegerris was the set decorator, Odette Myrtil was in charge of costumes, music was handled by Heinz Roemheld and David Chudnow, the sound of the film was done by William Fox, and the dance was staged by Eddie Prinz. The film included the song, “Loneliness” by Victor Young and Ned Washington.

The film was released on January 22, 1949, and in April of 1949, a Human Resource news item reported that the film lost $400,000, which caused CBS, who had purchased the production company from Benny, to sue Benny. Additionally, in August 1948 Human Resources had Irmgard Dawson, Crane Whitely, Jack Shea, Bert Stevens, Barbara Stone, and Jim Nolan in the cast for the film, but they were never seen on the released film. Lastly, this film was Billy Vine’s first appearance on the big screen.
