= Belle Starr's Daughter =

1948 film by Lesley Selander

- Theatrical release poster
- Directed by: Lesley Selander
- Written by: W. R. Burnett
- Produced by: Edward L. Alperson
- Starring: George Montgomery; Rod Cameron; Ruth Roman
- Cinematography: William A. Sickner
- Edited by: Jason H. Bernie
- Music by: Edward Kilenyi
- Color process: Black and white
- Production company: Edward L. Alperson Productions
- Distributed by: 20th Century Fox
- Release dates: November 11, 1948 (Los Angeles); November 15, 1948 (United States)
- Running time: 86 minutes
- Country: United States
- Language: English

Belle Starr's Daughter is a 1948 American Western film directed by Lesley Selander and starring George Montgomery, Rod Cameron and Ruth Roman.

== Plot ==
After the town marshal of Antioch is shot by Bob Yauntis, the newly appointed Tom Jackson sets out to apprehend the killer. But when he and his posse get to the ranch of bandit queen Belle Starr, they discover her dead body and the house on fire. Seeing this from a distance, Belle's daughter Rose mistakenly concludes Marshal Jackson killed her mother.

Rose works as a waitress and Jackson attempts to romance her, but she is cold to his advances. Rose begins pulling off robberies along with Bob, who shoots the ranch's foreman, Lafe Bailey and attempts to avoid detection as a ruthless outlaw called "Bitter Creek" who is being sought by lawmen.

Bob eventually turns his wrath on Rose, striking her and holding her captive. Rose escapes and turns to Jackson, who is in love with her. After being taken into custody, Bob is able to wing Jackson with a concealed weapon, whereupon Jackson shoots him dead.

== Cast ==
- George Montgomery as Marshal Tom Jackson
- Rod Cameron as Bob 'Bitter Creek' Yauntis
- Ruth Roman as Cimarron Rose
- Wallace Ford as Lafe Bailey
- Charles Kemper as Deputy Gaffer
- William Edward Phipps as Yuma Talbott
- Edith King as Mrs. Allen
- Jack Lambert as Bronc Wilson
- Fred Libby as Slim Smith
- Isabel Jewell as Belle Starr
- J. Farrell MacDonald as Doc Benson
- Chris-Pin Martin as Spanish George (as Cris-Pin Martin)
- Larry Johns as Marshal Jed Purdy
- Kenneth MacDonald as Uncle Jim Davis
- Christine Larson as Marie (as Christine Larsen)
- Charles Stevens as Cherokee Joe
- William Perrott as Marshal Jed Loftus
- Mary Foran as Bonnie
- Frank Darien as Old Man
- Paul E. Burns as Clearwater Doctor
- Alvin Hammer as Townsman
- Lane Chandler as Marshal Evans

== See also ==
- Belle Starr (film) - 1941 American Western film
- List of American films of 1948
