= Wildcat Bus =

- Theatrical release poster
- Directed by: Frank Woodruff
- Screenplay by: Lou Lusty
- Story by: Lou Lusty
- Produced by: Cliff Reid
- Starring: Fay Wray; Charles Lang Jr. Paul Guilfoyle; Don Costello; Paul McGrath
- Cinematography: Jack MacKenzie
- Edited by: George Crone
- Music by: Roy Webb
- Production company: RKO Pictures
- Distributed by: RKO Pictures
- Release date: August 23, 1940
- Running time: 64 minutes
- Country: United States
- Language: English

Wildcat Bus is a 1940 American action film directed by Frank Woodruff and written by Lou Lusty. The film stars Fay Wray, Charles Lang, Paul Guilfoyle, Don Costello and Paul McGrath. The film was released on August 23, 1940, by RKO Pictures.

== Cast ==
- Fay Wray as Ted Dawson
- Charles Lang as Jerry Waters
- Paul Guilfoyle as Donovan
- Don Costello as Sid Casey
- Paul McGrath as Stanley Regan
- Joe Sawyer as Burke
- Roland Drew as Davis
- Leona Roberts as Emma 'Ma' Talbot
- Oscar O'Shea as Charles Dawson
- Frank Shannon as Sweeney
- Warren Ashe as Joe Miller
