= Frank Woodruff =

American film director

- Born: June 11, 1906; Columbia, South Carolina, United States
- Died: September 16, 1983 (aged 77); Los Angeles, California, United States
- Occupations: Director, Producer
- Years active: 1940–1951 (film & TV)

Frank Woodruff (1906–1983) was an American film director of the 1940s. He also produced and directed a number of episodes of the television show The Bigelow Theatre in the early 1950s.

== Filmography ==
- Curtain Call (1940)
- Wildcat Bus (1940)
- Cross-Country Romance (1940)
- Lady Scarface (1941)
- Play Girl (1941)
- Repent at Leisure (1941)
- Cowboy in Manhattan (1943)
- Pistol Packin' Mama (1943)
- Two Señoritas from Chicago (1943)
- Lady, Let's Dance (1944)

== Bibliography ==
- Fetrow, Alan G. Feature Films, 1940-1949: a United States Filmography. McFarland, 1994.
