= Valley Oaks Memorial Park =

Cemetery, mortuary and crematory in Westlake Village, California

Valley Oaks - Griffin Memorial Park
- Interactive map of Valley Oaks - Griffin Memorial Park

Details
- Established: 1967
- Location: Westlake Village, Los Angeles County, California
- Country: United States
- Coordinates: 34.1514°N 118.7997°W
- Owned by: Service Corporation International
- Website: Dignity Memorial Page
- Find a Grave: Valley Oaks - Griffin Memorial Park

Valley Oaks - Griffin Memorial Park is a cemetery, mortuary and crematory located at 5600 Lindero Canyon Road, in Westlake Village, California, United States.

== Notable interments ==
- Rafael Campos (1936–1985), actor
- Karen Carpenter (1950–1983), drummer and singer
- Hoyt Curtin (1922–2000), composer
- Cesare Danova (1926–1992), actor
- Eddie Dean (1907–1999), singer
- Steve Forrest (1925–2013), actor
- Ron Goldman (1968–1994), murder victim
- Jack Kirby (1917–1994), comic book artist
- Mort Lindsey (1923–2012), musician
- Virginia Mayo (1920–2005), actress
- Harry Nilsson (1941–1994), singer
- George O'Hanlon (1912–1989), actor
- Michael O'Shea (1906–1973), actor
- Gene Perret (1937–2022), television writer
- William Edward Phipps (1922–2018), actor
- Artie Shaw (1910–2004), musician
- Kristoff St. John (1966–2019), actor
- Vic Tanny (1912–1985), fitness advocate
