= William Edward Phipps =

American actor (1922–2018)

William Phipps
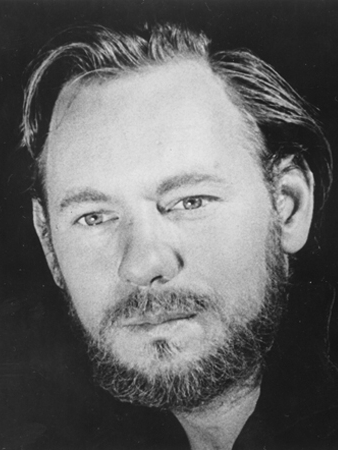
- Promotional headshot, 1951
- Born: William Edward Phipps; February 4, 1922
- Died: June 1, 2018 (aged 96); Santa Monica, California, U.S.
- Resting place: Valley Oaks Memorial Park
- Education: Eastern Illinois University
- Occupations: Actor, film producer
- Years active: 1947–2000

William Edward Phipps (February 4, 1922 – June 1, 2018) was an American actor and producer, sometimes credited simply as William Phipps, known for his roles in films and on television.

== Early years ==
=== Hometown ===
Phipps grew up in St. Francisville, Illinois. His parents divorced when he was six years old. By the time he was in high school, he was using his stepfather's last name of Couch. He developed a love of acting at a young age and performed in several plays in grade school and high school. One of the plays in which he performed, during his junior year of high school in 1937, was Before Morning, a 1933 play made into a film that same year.

=== College ===
After graduating from high school in 1939, he attended Eastern Illinois University in Charleston, Illinois, where he majored in accounting, was elected freshman class president and served as head cheerleader. After two years of college, he moved to Hollywood, to pursue a career in acting and resumed his original last name of Phipps.

=== World War II ===
During that same year, the United States entered into World War II, and Phipps enlisted in the United States Navy, serving as a radio operator on several ships all across the Pacific. He served three years, then settled in Los Angeles to begin his career. He enrolled in the Actors' Laboratory Theatre in Hollywood, alongside fellow actor Russell Johnson.

=== Hollywood ===
Phipps' big break came when he and Johnson were double-cast, sharing the same role in a play at the Actors Lab. They drew straws to see which actor would perform in the matinée, and which would take the evening show. Phipps drew the evening show, which was attended that same evening by actor Charles Laughton. Laughton was impressed by Phipps' performance and came backstage afterwards to ask Phipps to perform in Laughton's own play. Phipps' career took off, and he was soon in his first feature film, Crossfire (1947). In 1949, Phipps auditioned for the speaking voice of Prince Charming in the upcoming Disney film Cinderella. The studio was pleased with his performance and Phipps was offered the part by Walt Disney himself.

In 1959, he guest-starred as "Ken Wills" a cheated card player in Bat Masterson, teaming up with the star to clean out a town of crooked poker dealers in the episode "License To Cheat" (S1E17).

In 1962, he guest-starred on the TV Western Gunsmoke as weak husband “Ham” in S7E33's “The Prisoner”.

== Hawaii ==
After nearly thirty years in the business, performing in film and television in a wide variety of roles, Phipps took a break from Hollywood and moved to Hawaii. While there, he hosted a movie presentation program called Hollywood Oldies, on Maui's Cable 7. After a little more than five years in Hawaii, he returned to Hollywood to portray President Theodore Roosevelt in the 1976 miniseries Eleanor and Franklin.

== Retirement and post-career ==
Phipps' last movie role was in the 2000 independent film Sordid Lives, in which he also served as one of the film's producers. In 2005, several of Phipps' films were the subject of an EIU (Eastern Illinois University) film festival in his honor. He received an honorary doctorate from the university the following year.

== Death ==
Phipps died on June 1, 2018, in Santa Monica, California, at the age of 96 from lung cancer. He is buried in Valley Oaks Memorial Park.

== Filmography ==
| Year | Title | Role | Notes |
|---|---|---|---|
| 1947 | Crossfire | Leroy | |
| 1948 | The Arizona Ranger | Ranger Mac | |
| 1948 | Train to Alcatraz | Tommy Callahan | |
| 1948 | They Live by Night | Young Farmer | |
| 1948 | Station West | Sergeant | Uncredited |
| 1948 | Desperadoes of Dodge City | Ted Loring | |
| 1948 | Belle Starr's Daughter | Yuma Talbott | |
| 1949 | Scene of the Crime | Young Gun Owner | Uncredited |
| 1950 | The Man on the Eiffel Tower | Janvier | |
| 1950 | Key to the City | Reporter | Uncredited |
| 1950 | Cinderella | Prince Charming | Voice |
| 1950 | The Outriders | Young Union Guard | |
| 1950 | The Vanishing Westerner | Bud Thurber | |
| 1950 | Rider from Tucson | Tug Bailey | |
| 1951 | Five | Michael | |
| 1951 | No Questions Asked | Roger | |
| 1951 | The Red Badge of Courage | Officer | Uncredited |
| 1952 | Rose of Cimarron | Jeb Dawley | |
| 1952 | Fort Osage | Nathan Goodspeed | |
| 1952 | Loan Shark | Ed Haines | Uncredited |
| 1952 | Flat Top | Red Kelley | |
| 1953 | The Blue Gardenia | Lt. George Foster | Voice, Uncredited |
| 1953 | The War of the Worlds | Wash Perry | |
| 1953 | Invaders from Mars | Sgt. Baker | |
| 1953 | Julius Caesar | Servant to Antony | |
| 1953 | Savage Frontier | Johnny Webb | |
| 1953 | The Twonky | Student | |
| 1953 | Northern Patrol | Frank Stevens | |
| 1953 | Fort Algiers | Lt. Gerrier | |
| 1953 | Cat-Women of the Moon | Doug Smith | |
| 1953 | Red River Shore | Ned Barlow | |
| 1954 | Riot in Cell Block 11 | Mickey | |
| 1954 | Executive Suite | Bill Lundeen | |
| 1954 | Jesse James vs. the Daltons | Bill Dalton | |
| 1954 | Francis Joins the WACS | Jeep driver | Uncredited |
| 1954 | Two Guns and a Badge | Dick Grant - Rancher | |
| 1954 | The Snow Creature | Lieutenant Dunbar | |
| 1954 | The Violent Men | Bud Hinkleman | Uncredited |
| 1955 | Rage at Dawn | Bill Peterson Jr. | Uncredited |
| 1955 | Smoke Signal | Pvt. Porter | |
| 1955 | The Eternal Sea | Legless Sailor | Uncredited |
| 1955 | The Far Horizons | Oarsman / Camp Sentry | Uncredited |
| 1955 | Lord of the Jungle | Kenny Balou | |
| 1955 | The Indian Fighter | Lt. Blake | |
| 1956 | The Man in the Gray Flannel Suit | Army Sergeant | Uncredited |
| 1956 | Great Day in the Morning | Ralston | Uncredited |
| 1956 | The First Texan | Lt. Jack LeBlanc | Uncredited |
| 1956 | Away All Boats | Ship Machinist | Uncredited |
| 1956 | G.E. Summer Originals | | Episode: "Blizzard Bound" (S1/E7) |
| 1956 | The Boss | Stitch | |
| 1956 | Lust for Life | Emile Bernard | |
| 1956 | The Desperados Are in Town | Bit Man at Cotton Gin | Uncredited |
| 1956 | The Wild Party | Wino | |
| 1957 | Badlands of Montana | Walt Branton | |
| 1957 | The Brothers Rico | Joe Wesson | |
| 1957 | Kiss Them for Me | Lt. Al Hendricks | Uncredited |
| 1957 | Escape from Red Rock | Arky Shanks | |
| 1958 | The Day of the Trumpet | Pvt. Steve Haines | |
| 1958 | The Walter Winchell File | Stony Jones | Episode: "David & Goliath" |
| 1958 | Decision | Leslie Henderson | Episode: "The Tall Man" |
| 1958 | Man on the Run | Jay | |
| 1959 | The FBI Story | Baby Face Nelson | Uncredited |
| 1959 | Gunsmoke | Hody Peel | Episode: "Odd Man Out" (S5/E11) |
| 1959 | Gunsmoke | Lou | Episode: "The Coward" |
| 1959 | The Rifleman | Asa Manning | Episode: "The Money Gun" |
| 1962 | The Virginian | Jack Wheeler | Episode: "Impasse" |
| 1962 | The Alfred Hitchcock Hour | The Bartender | Season 1 Episode 12: "Hangover" |
| 1962 | Black Gold | Albert Mailer | |
| 1963 | Showdown | Deputy | Uncredited |
| 1963 | Gunsmoke | Joe Stark | Episode: "Carter Caper" |
| 1964 | The Evil of Frankenstein | Rena's Father | additional sequence: US, Uncredited |
| 1965 | Harlow | Reporter | Uncredited |
| 1965 | Combat! | Pvt. Barnhill | Episode: "The Old Men" |
| 1966 | Incident at Phantom Hill | Trader | |
| 1966 | The Green Hornet | Jack Starkey | Episode: "May the Best Man Lose" |
| 1966 | Dead Heat on a Merry-Go-Round | Kleiner | Uncredited |
| 1966 | Not with My Wife, You Don't! | Sergeant | Uncredited |
| 1967 | Gunfight in Abilene | Frank Norton | |
| 1977 | The Trial of Lee Harvey Oswald | Captain Will Fritz | TV film |
| 1978 | Space Force | Commander Irving Hinkley | |
| 1983 | The Dukes of Hazzard | Barney Benson | Episode: "Big Brothers Duke" |
| 1984 | Dune | Narrator | TV version, Uncredited |
| 1988 | Messenger of Death | Doc Turner | |
| 1993 | Homeward Bound: The Incredible Journey | Quentin | |
| 2000 | Sordid Lives | Rev Barnes | (final film role) |
