= Back Trail =

1948 American western film, directed by Christy Cabanne

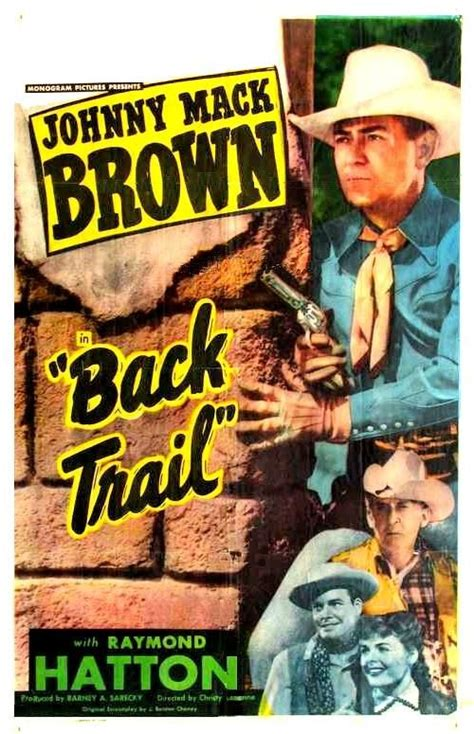
- Theatrical release poster
- Directed by: Christy Cabanne
- Written by: J. Benton Cheney
- Produced by: Barney Sarecky
- Starring: Johnny Mack Brown; Raymond Hatton; Mildred Coles
- Cinematography: Harry Neumann
- Edited by: John C. Fuller
- Music by: Edward J. Kay
- Production company: Monogram Productions
- Release date: July 18, 1948 (US)
- Running time: 54 minutes
- Country: United States
- Language: English

Back Trail is a 1948 American Western film, directed by Christy Cabanne. It stars Johnny Mack Brown, Raymond Hatton, and Mildred Coles, and was released on July 18, 1948.

== Plot ==
Bob Frazer is a businessman in Brentwood. When he was younger and lived back east he was framed for embezzling funds from his clients by his partner, Frank Gilmore. After getting out of jail, he headed west for a fresh start. However, his partner, who was actually the one who embezzled the funds, followed him west, and is using the threat of exposing his past to blackmail him. In exchange for keeping his secret, particularly from his daughter Helen and her fiancée Terry Dugan, Frazer provides Gilmore with the times and routes of payroll stages, which Gilmore's gang then robs.

Johnnie Mack is hired to investigate the series of robberies, and when arrives in town he meets up with his old friend, Casoose. He suspects that Frazer is somehow involved, but Frazer vehemently denies it. Mack sets up a fake gold shipment, and only tells Frazer about it. When the false shipment is robbed by Gilmore's gang, Mack captures one of the gang, Pacos. Mack is now convinced of Frazer's involvement. After Frazer breaks Pacos out of jail, following Gilmore's orders, he is confronted by Mack. He asks Mack for 24 hours to clean up the mess he created. However, Mack realizes that Frazer intends to kill Gilmore, and stops him before he can commit murder. When Frazer breaks down and confesses his past to Mack, he is overheard by Helen and Terry, who tell him that they don't care about his past.

Mack, Frazer, and the local sheriff come up with a plan to trap Gilmore. The sheriff arrests Frazer and locks him jail. When Gilmore arrives to shoot Frazer, Frazer tells him that he has written down everything they have done together and locked it in his safe, and it was to be given to the sheriff in the event of his death. Gilmore leaves and attempts to break into the safe, where he is confronted by Mack and Casoose. However, they are surprised by Gilmore's gang, allowing Gilmore to escape. After subduing the gang, Mack and Casoose chase after Gilmore, eventually catch him and arrest him.

Helen and Terry get married and leave on their honeymoon.

== Cast ==
- Johnny Mack Brown as Johnny Mack
- Raymond Hatton as Casoose
- Mildred Coles as Helen Frazer
- Marshall Reed as Lacey
- James W. Horne as Terry Dugan
- Snub Pollard as Goofy
- Ted Adams as Bob Frazer
- Pierce Lyden as Frank Gilmore
- George Holmes as Rocky
- Bob Woodward as Turk

== Production ==
Filming on the picture took place between May 13 and May 19, 1947, with production on the film had finished by the end of May 1947. In mid-June it was announced that the film would be released on July 18. The Legion of Decency gave the picture an A-1 rating.
