= Eddy Waller =

American actor (1889–1977)

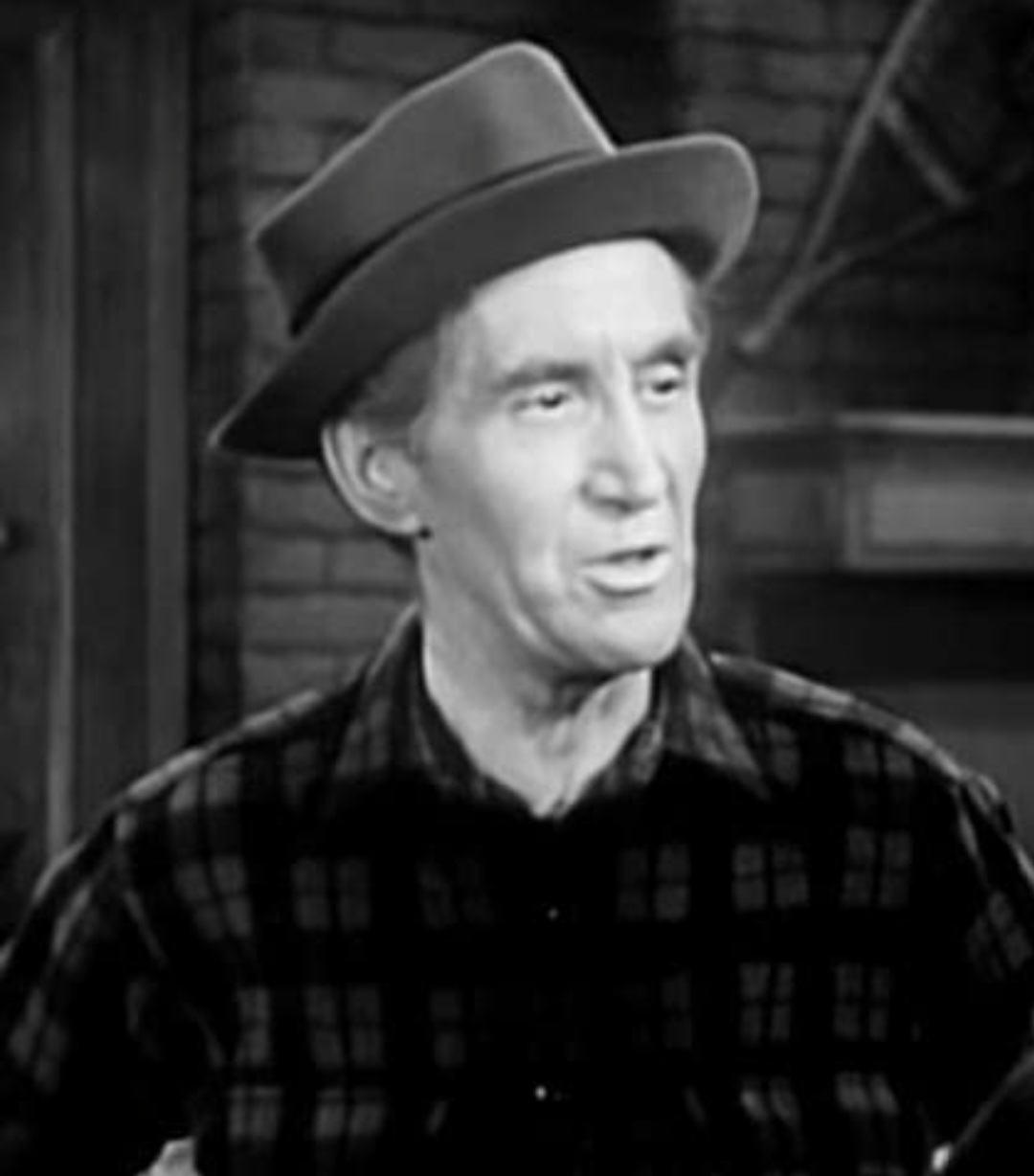
- Waller in The Missing Corpse (1945)
- Born: Edward C Waller; June 14, 1889; Chippewa Falls, Wisconsin, U.S.
- Died: August 20, 1977 (aged 88); Los Angeles, California, U.S.
- Resting place: Forest Lawn Memorial Park Cemetery, Hollywood Hills, California
- Occupation: Actor
- Years active: 1912–1963

Edward Waller (June 14, 1889 – August 20, 1977) was an American stage, film and television actor.

== Early years ==
Waller's involvement with dramatics began when he was a student at the University of Wisconsin (UW). As a child he gave monologs at Christmas parties, at his family's house hoping that they would result in monetary rewards from some of the friends and family members present. He wanted to become an actor, but his parents insisted that he study at UW and become a doctor. That prospect ended when he fainted the first time he observed an operation. "The next day," he said, "I grabbed a train for Chicago and within a week I had a berth in a traveling show and was out on the road."

== Career ==
=== Stage ===
Waller performed in vaudeville and the legitimate theater before he entered films in Hollywood. His professional stage debut came in Chicago, Illinois. An item published in The Indianapolis News May 3, 1923, reported, "He has had several years' experience as leading man and also as director, and produces the Grand Players' plays as well as taking the leading roles." Waller became noted for his character impersonations of elderly men on stage and screen.

=== Film ===
Waller appeared in more than 250 sound films between 1929 and 1963 (Thomas M. Feramisco, in his book, The Mummy Unwrapped: Scenes Left on Universal's Cutting Room, has Waller "making the move to celluloid in 1936."), including 116 westerns and six serials. In 1955 Waller appeared as "Old Larky" (under the name credit Eddy C. Waller) in the film Foxfire starring Jane Russell and Jeff Chandler. He is best remembered as Nugget Clark, the sidekick in many films starring Allan 'Rocky' Lane between 1947 and 1953.

=== Television ===
In 1955, Waller became Rusty Lee, the saddle partner to actor Douglas Kennedy in the short-lived television series, Steve Donovan, Western Marshal. After that, he appeared in several A-westerns and television programs and was a semi-regular as Mose Shell, the dedicated stagecoach driver, in nineteen episodes of the NBC western series Laramie, with John Smith and Robert Fuller.

Waller had a supporting role in the 1957-1958 syndicated series, Casey Jones starring Alan Hale, Jr. Waller played "Red Rock", the train conductor of Casey's Cannonball Express. He also played John Finney in the 1960-1961 miniseries Daniel Boone, which ran as part of Walt Disney Presents.

== Death ==
Waller died of a stroke in Los Angeles, California, at the age of eighty-eight. He was buried in Forest Lawn Memorial Park (Hollywood Hills). His wife of forty-nine years, Doris M. Waller (1902-1977), had died in January 1977.

== Selected filmography ==
=== Films ===
- The Mind Reader (1933) - Chauffeur (uncredited)
- One Way Ticket (1935) - George the Clerk (uncredited)
- Silver Spurs (1936) - Old-Timer (uncredited)
- Poppy (1936) - Bit part (uncredited)
- Rhythm on the Range (1936) - Field Judge (uncredited)
- Meet Nero Wolfe (1936) - Golf Starter
- The Public Pays (1936, Short) - The Association's Landlord (uncredited)
- Banjo on My Knee (1936) - Truck Driver (uncredited)
- On the Avenue (1937) - Shooting Gallery Attendant (uncredited)
- Secret Agent X-9 (1937, Serial) - Lawyer Carp [Chs. 2, 12] (uncredited)
- Sweetheart of the Navy (1937) - Krump
- Wild and Woolly (1937) - Fireman (uncredited)
- The Big Shot (1937) - Horace (uncredited)
- Small Town Boy (1937) - Sloane (uncredited)
- The Bad Man of Brimstone (1937) - Cassiius Bundy (uncredited)
- Call the Mesquiteers (1938) - Hardy
- State Police (1938) - Const. Higgins
- The Great Adventures of Wild Bill Hickok (1938, Serial) - Stone
- Flaming Frontiers (1938, Serial) - Andy Grant (Chs. 1–4)
- Strange Faces (1938) - Jeb, Mason City Obit Writer (uncredited)
- The Law West of Tombstone (1938) - Jenks, Martinez Postmaster (uncredited)
- Out West with the Hardys (1938) - 'Doc' Carson Hodge, a Veterinarian (uncredited)
- Stand Up and Fight (1939) - Conductor (uncredited)
- Jesse James (1939) - Deputy
- Rough Riders' Round-up (1939) - (uncredited)
- I'm from Missouri (1939)
- The Story of Alexander Graham Bell (1939) - Storekeeper (uncredited)
- The Return of the Cisco Kid (1939) - Guard on Stagecoach
- Young Mr. Lincoln (1939) - Father (scenes deleted)
- Mutiny on the Blackhawk (1939) - Parson
- New Frontier (1939) - Maj. Steven Braddock
- Konga, the Wild Stallion (1939) - Gloomy
- Two Bright Boys (1939) - Sheriff
- Legion of Lost Flyers (1939) - Petey
- Allegheny Uprising (1939) - Jailer
- Geronimo (1939) - Private (uncredited)
- Man from Montreal (1939) - Old Jacques
- The Cisco Kid and the Lady (1939) - Second Stage Driver (uncredited)
- Legion of the Lawless (1940) - Lafe Barton
- The Blue Bird (1940) - Birch Tree (uncredited)
- The Grapes of Wrath (1940) - Proprietor
- Viva Cisco Kid (1940) - Stagecoach Driver (uncredited)
- Enemy Agent (1940) - Cellmate (uncredited)
- 20 Mule Team (1940) - Horsecollar, the Bartender (uncredited)
- Love, Honor and Oh-Baby! (1940) - Panhandler
- You're Not So Tough (1940) - Griswold
- Stagecoach War (1940) - Quince Cobalt
- Carolina Moon (1940) - Colonel Stanhope
- Gold Rush Maisie (1940) - Ben Hartley
- Girl from Avenue A (1940) - Groom (uncredited)
- Brigham Young (1940) - Man with California Gold News (uncredited)
- Boom Town (1940) - Hotel Clerk (uncredited)
- The Howards of Virginia (1940) - Patriot Scout (uncredited)
- The Devil's Pipeline (1940) - Benedict
- Youth Will Be Served (1940) - First Prisoner (uncredited)
- Texas Terrors (1940) - Judge Charles Bennett
- Santa Fe Trail (1940) - Workman (uncredited)
- Western Union (1941) - Stagecoach Driver #1 (uncredited)
- Scattergood Baines (1941) - Townsman (uncredited)
- Nice Girl? (1941) - Farmer (uncredited)
- Double Date (1941) - Truck Driver
- In Old Colorado (1941) - Jim Stark
- Hands Across the Rockies (1941) - Judge Plunkett
- Sergeant York (1941) - Man at Church (uncredited)
- The Son of Davy Crockett (1941) - Grandpa Mathews
- Bad Men of Missouri (1941) - Wagon Train Leader (uncredited)
- Six-Gun Gold (1941) - Ben Blanchard
- Honky Tonk (1941) - Fred - Train Conductor #2 (uncredited)
- The Bandit Trail (1941) - Tom Haggerty
- Public Enemies (1941) - Olaf
- Road Agent (1941) - Lewis (Rancher)
- Don't Get Personal (1942) - Slim
- Wild Bill Hickok Rides (1942) - Settler (uncredited)
- Shut My Big Mouth (1942) - Happy (uncredited)
- The Lone Star Ranger (1942) - Mitchell
- Klondike Fury (1942) - Blindy (uncredited)
- Sundown Jim (1942) - Clem Black
- Junior G-Men of the Air (1942, Serial) - Jed Holden [Chs. 1, 3, 5-6] (uncredited)
- My Gal Sal (1942) - Buggy Driver (uncredited)
- Juke Girl (1942) - Motorist Buying 6 Cents of Gas (uncredited)
- Wings for the Eagle (1942) - Customer Offered Pie (uncredited)
- A-Haunting We Will Go (1942) - Wilcox, Baggage Man (uncredited)
- Call of the Canyon (1942) - Dave Crosby (uncredited)
- Sin Town (1942) - Forager (uncredited)
- Night Monster (1942) - Jed Harmon
- The Mummy's Tomb (1942) - Police Scientist (uncredited)
- Scattergood Survives a Murder (1942) - Lafe Allen
- Cinderella Swings It (1943) - Lem
- Something to Shout About (1943) - George Priam - Concert Attendee (uncredited)
- Hangmen Also Die! (1943) - Hansom Cab Driver (uncredited)
- A Stranger in Town (1943) - Man in Barbershop (uncredited)
- Frontier Badmen (1943) - Auctioneer (uncredited)
- Silver Spurs (1943) - Davis (uncredited)
- Destroyer (1943) - Riveter (uncredited)
- A Lady Takes a Chance (1943) - Bus Station Attendant
- Headin' for God's Country (1943) - Hank
- The Kansan (1943) - Ed Gilbert
- Always a Bridesmaid (1943) - Justice Peters
- Sweet Rosie O'Grady (1943) - Shopkeeper (uncredited)
- My Kingdom for a Cook (1943) - Sam Thornton
- Ladies Courageous (1944) - Workman (uncredited)
- Up in Arms (1944) - Milkman (uncredited)
- Rationing (1944) - Smith (uncredited)
- The Adventures of Mark Twain (1944) - Southerner (uncredited)
- Man from Frisco (1944) - Older Worker (uncredited)
- Home in Indiana (1944) - Bill (uncredited)
- The Mummy's Ghost (1944) - Ben Evans (uncredited)
- Raiders of Ghost City (1944) - Doc Blair
- Barbary Coast Gent (1944) - Chad Jenkins - Second Stage Driver (uncredited)
- Tall in the Saddle (1944) - Santa Inez Depot Master (uncredited)
- An American Romance (1944) - Sheriff of Oak Hills (uncredited)
- Mystery of the River Boat (1944, Serial) - Charles Langtry
- Belle of the Yukon (1944) - Lynch Mob Member with Rope (uncredited)
- Under Western Skies (1945) - Preacher (uncredited)
- The Man Who Walked Alone (1945) - Farmer
- The Affairs of Susan (1945) - Grumpy Man at Bright Dollar (uncredited)
- The Missing Corpse (1945) - Desmond
- River Gang (1945) - Mr. Fish (uncredited)
- Rough Riders of Cheyenne (1945) - Andy Carson
- Dakota (1945) - Stagecoach Driver
- San Antonio (1945) - Cattleman (uncredited)
- Abilene Town (1946) - Hannaberry
- Because of Him (1946) - Gubbins (uncredited)
- Little Giant (1946) - Driver at Air-Pump (scenes deleted)
- Sun Valley Cyclone (1946) - Major Harding
- In Old Sacramento (1946) - Wagon Driver (uncredited)
- Renegades (1946) - Davy Lane (uncredited)
- Lover Come Back (1946) - Mr. Russell (uncredited)
- Avalanche (1946) - Sam
- Rendezvous with Annie (1946) - Civil War Veteran (uncredited)
- Sing While You Dance (1946) - Lem Aubrey
- Rustlers Round-Up (1946) - Tom Fremont
- Singing on the Trail (1946) - Lem
- Plainsman and the Lady (1946) - Fred Willats (uncredited)
- Magnificent Doll (1946) - Arthur (uncredited)
- Boston Blackie and the Law (1946) - Locksmith (uncredited)
- A Boy and His Dog (1946, Short) - Sheriff Kelly
- The Beginning or the End (1947) - Man (uncredited)
- The Michigan Kid (1947) - Post Office Clerk (uncredited)
- The Sea of Grass (1947) - Homesteader (uncredited)
- Pursued (1947) - Ben McComber (uncredited)
- The Millerson Case (1947) - Jeremiah Dobbs (uncredited)
- Sport of Kings (1947) - Perkins (uncredited)
- Wyoming (1947) - Drifter (uncredited)
- The Secret Life of Walter Mitty (1947) - Old Mariner (uncredited)
- Wild Harvest (1947) - Mr. Hatfield (uncredited)
- The Wild Frontier (1947) - Nugget Clark
- Magic Town (1947) - New Citizen in Crowd (uncredited)
- Nightmare Alley (1947) - Farmer Friend of J.E. Giles (uncredited)
- Louisiana (1947) - Mr. Davis
- Dangerous Years (1947) - Jock Nealy (uncredited)
- Bandits of Dark Canyon (1947) - Nugget Clark
- Secret Beyond the Door (1947) - Lem (uncredited)
- The Wreck of the Hesperus (1948) - Turnkey
- Black Bart (1948) - Ed Mason
- Oklahoma Badlands (1948) - Nugget Clark
- The Return of the Whistler (1948) - Sam the Estate Caretaker (uncredited)
- Adventures in Silverado (1948) - Will Thatcher
- The Bold Frontiersman (1948) - Sheriff Nugget Clark
- Carson City Raiders (1948) - Nugget Clark
- Speed to Spare (1948) - Charlie Blane, Explosives Driver (uncredited)
- River Lady (1948) - Hewitt
- Marshal of Amarillo (1948) - Nugget Clark
- The Arkansas Swing (1948) - Boggs
- The Strawberry Roan (1948) - Steve
- Desperadoes of Dodge City (1948) - Nugget Clark
- The Denver Kid (1948) - Nugget Clark
- The Girl from Manhattan (1948) - Jim Allison
- The Return of October (1948) - Stableman (uncredited)
- Sundown in Santa Fe (1948) - Horace Harvey 'Nugget' Clark
- Renegades of Sonora (1948) - Nugget Clark
- Whispering Smith (1948) - Conductor
- Sheriff of Wichita (1949) - Nugget Clark
- Death Valley Gunfighter (1949) - Nugget Clark
- Ma and Pa Kettle (1949) - Mr. Green (uncredited)
- Frontier Investigator (1949) - Nugget Clark
- Lust for Gold (1949) - Coroner (uncredited)
- Massacre River (1949) - Joe
- The Wyoming Bandit (1949) - Nugget Clark
- Bandit King of Texas (1949) - Nugget Clark
- Navajo Trail Raiders (1949) - Nugget Clark
- Powder River Rustlers (1949) - Nugget Clark
- The Traveling Saleswoman (1950) - Mr. Owen (uncredited)
- Gunmen of Abilene (1950) - Sheriff Nugget Clark
- Father Is a Bachelor (1950) - White (uncredited)
- Code of the Silver Sage (1950) - Nugget Clark
- Salt Lake Raiders (1950) - Nugget Clark
- Curtain Call at Cactus Creek (1950) - Jailer (uncredited)
- Covered Wagon Raid (1950) - Nugget Clark
- The Furies (1950) - Old Man (uncredited)
- Vigilante Hideout (1950) - Nugget Clark
- Frisco Tornado (1950) - Nugget Clark
- Woman on the Run (1950) - Storekeeper (uncredited)
- Rustlers on Horseback (1950) - Nugget Clark
- He's a Cockeyed Wonder (1950) - Pops Dunlap (uncredited)
- Mrs. O'Malley and Mr. Malone (1950) - Rigger (uncredited)
- California Passage (1950) - Waiter
- Cavalry Scout (1951) - General William Sherman
- Indian Uprising (1952) - Sagebrush
- Leadville Gunslinger (1952) - Nugget Clark
- Black Hills Ambush (1952) - Nugget Clark
- Montana Territory (1952) - Possum Enoch
- Thundering Caravans (1952) - Sheriff Nugget Clark
- Desperadoes' Outpost (1952) - Nugget Clark
- Marshal of Cedar Rock (1953) - Nugget Clark
- It Happens Every Thursday (1953) - James Bartlett
- Savage Frontier (1953) - Nugget Clark
- Powder River (1953) - Stable Owner (uncredited)
- The Last Posse (1953) - Dr. Pryor
- Bandits of the West (1953) - Nugget Clark
- Champ for a Day (1953) - Phil
- 99 River Street (1953) - Pop Durkee
- El Paso Stampede (1953) - Nugget Clark
- Make Haste to Live (1954) - 'Spud' Kelly
- The Far Country (1954) - Yukon Sam (uncredited)
- The Man from Laramie (1955) - Dr. Selden (uncredited)
- Man Without a Star (1955) - Tom Cassidy
- Foxfire (1955) - Old Larky
- The Night Runner (1957) - Vernon
- The Phantom Stagecoach (1957) - Sam Clayton (uncredited)
- The Restless Breed (1957) - Caesar
- Day of the Badman (1958) - Mr. Slocum
- Lassie: A Christmas Tail (1963) - Matt Krebs

=== Television series ===
- Ford Theatre (1952–1955) - Station Master / Clam-digger / Courtney
- The Lone Ranger (1953–1955) - Hardrock Hazen / Haskell / Jules
- The Cisco Kid (1954) - Dr. Bender / Eli Oliver
- Letter to Loretta (1954) - Joe Rogan
- Four Star Playhouse (1955) - Andy
- Steve Donovan, Western Marshal (1955–1956, supporting role) - Deputy Marshal Rusty Lee
- Fury (1956, episode "Tungsten Queen") - Hank Enos
- Sneak Preview (1956, episode "One Minute from Broadway")
- Broken Arrow (1957) - Hank Thompson
- Casey Jones (1957–1958, supporting role) - Red Rock Smith / Red Rock
- Wagon Train (1958, in "The Jennifer Churchill Story") - Ned
- The Texan, 2 episodes (1959) - Stage Driver / Oldest Rider
- The Life and Legend of Wyatt Earp as Rawhide Geraghty in "The Truth About Rawhide Geraghty" (1959); Hugh O'Brian as Wyatt Earp rides shotgun for the retiring 69-year-old Wells Fargo stagecoach driver Rawhide Geraghty on his last run from Tucumcari, New Mexico Territory, to Amarillo, Texas. The trip is hazardous with bandits and hostile Apache, and Rawhide is apprehensive about what he and Earp will face. - Rawhide Geraghty
- Man Without a Gun (1959, in "The Giant")
- Wanted: Dead or Alive (1959, "The Empty Cell") - Pop Cole
- Tales of Wells Fargo (1959–1961, 2 episodes) - Grandpa Charlie Bridger / Pat Rankin
- Overland Trail (1960) in episode 2: "The O'Mara Ladies"
- Pony Express (1960, in "The Search") - Nate
- Shotgun Slade (1960, in "The Missing Dog") - the Sheriff
- Outlaws (1961, in "Roly") - Forsythe
- Laramie (1959–1963, recurring role) - Mose / Mose - Stage Driver / Mose Shell
- Disneyland (1960–1962) - Captain Swain / John Finley / Linc
- Bonanza (1962, in "The First Born") - Harry
- Dr. Kildare (1962) - Dr. Millard Eakins
- Empire (1962 in "The Earth Mover") - Abel Saunders
- Lassie (1960-1963, 8 episodes) - Matt Krebbs / Henry Enders / Jonathan Grigsby
