= Desperadoes of Dodge City =

1948 film by Philip Ford

- Theatrical release poster
- Directed by: Philip Ford
- Screenplay by: Robert Creighton Williams
- Produced by: Gordon Kay
- Starring: Allan Lane; Eddy Waller; Mildred Coles; Roy Barcroft; Tristram Coffin; William Phipps
- Cinematography: John MacBurnie
- Edited by: Harold Minter
- Production company: Republic Pictures
- Distributed by: Republic Pictures
- Release date: September 15, 1948
- Running time: 60 minutes
- Country: United States
- Language: English

Desperadoes of Dodge City is a 1948 American Western film directed by Philip Ford and written by Robert Creighton Williams. The film stars Allan Lane, Eddy Waller, Mildred Coles, Roy Barcroft, Tristram Coffin and William Phipps. The film was released on September 15, 1948, by Republic Pictures.

== Plot ==
Rocky and the Land agent riders need to get an important message to the Army post. The message is stolen but Rocky knows one of the four men on the stagecoach has it. When Rocky and the four get trapped in a shack by the outlaw gang, he learns that one of the four is the gang leader. Rocky has to learn his identity and retrieve the message

== Cast ==
- Allan Lane as Rocky Lane
- Black Jack as Black Jack
- Eddy Waller as Nugget
- Mildred Coles as Gloria Lamoreaux
- Roy Barcroft as Homesteader
- Tristram Coffin as Ace Durant
- William Phipps as Ted Loring
- James Craven as Cal Sutton
- John Hamilton as Land Agent
- Ed Cassidy as Gideon
- House Peters, Jr. as Henry
- Dale Van Sickel as Henchman Pete
- Peggy Wynne as Henry's Wife
- Ted Mapes as Henchman Jake
