= Marshal of Amarillo =

1948 film by Philip Ford

- Theatrical release poster
- Directed by: Philip Ford
- Screenplay by: Robert Creighton Williams
- Produced by: Gordon Kay
- Starring: Allan Lane; Eddy Waller; Mildred Coles; Clayton Moore; Roy Barcroft; Trevor Bardette
- Cinematography: John MacBurnie
- Edited by: Harold Minter
- Production company: Republic Pictures
- Distributed by: Republic Pictures
- Release date: July 15, 1948
- Running time: 60 minutes
- Country: United States
- Language: English

Marshal of Amarillo is a 1948 American Western film directed by Philip Ford and written by Robert Creighton Williams. The film stars Allan Lane, Eddy Waller, Mildred Coles, Clayton Moore, Roy Barcroft and Trevor Bardette. The film was released on July 15, 1948 by Republic Pictures.

== Plot ==
An incident with bandits leaves a stagecoach stranded in the desert. The passengers are forced to walk to Halfway House, a stagecoach station and inn, to spend the night. "Nugget" Clark grows suspicious of the inn's creepy night clerk and flees in a wagon. He is stopped along the way by Marshal Rocky Lane who discovers one of the stagecoach passengers murdered in the back of Nugget's wagon. The two return to Halfway House but can find no evidence of the former night's events, and no one at the inn remembers seeing Nugget before. The third stagecoach passenger is also nowhere to be found. Convinced something sinister is going on, Rocky continues to investigate the situation, discovering that the missing passenger has been kidnapped for a sum of money he was carrying. Rocky recruits the kidnapped man's daughter to help him reveal who at Halfway House is behind the scheme. With help from the daughter and Nugget, Rocky uncovers the kidnappers and chases them down to their hideout where he rescues the missing passenger and brings the bad guys to justice.

== Cast ==
- Allan Lane as Marshal Rocky Lane
- Black Jack as Rocky's Horse
- Eddy Waller as Nugget Clark
- Mildred Coles as Marjorie Underwood
- Clayton Moore as Art Crandall
- Roy Barcroft as Ben Dolan
- Trevor Bardette as Frank Welch
- Minerva Urecal as Mrs. Henry Pettigrew
- Denver Pyle as The Night Clerk
- Charles Williams as Hiram Short
- Tom Chatterton as James Underwood
- Peter Perkins as Henchman Sam
- Tom London as Mr. Snodgrass
- Lynn Castile as Matilda Snodgrass
