= Adventures in Silverado =

1948 film

- Theatrical release poster
- Directed by: Phil Karlson
- Screenplay by: Kenneth Gamet; Tom Kilpatrick; Jo Pagano
- Based on: Silverado Squatters by Robert Louis Stevenson
- Produced by: Ted Richmond; Robert Cohn
- Starring: William Bishop; Gloria Henry; Edgar Buchanan; Forrest Tucker; Edgar Barrier
- Cinematography: Henry Freulich
- Edited by: Henry Batista
- Production company: Columbia Pictures
- Distributed by: Columbia Pictures
- Release date: March 25, 1948
- Running time: 75 minutes
- Country: United States
- Language: English

Adventures in Silverado (also known as Above All Laws) is a 1948 American Western film directed by Phil Karlson and written by Kenneth Gamet, Tom Kilpatrick and Jo Pagano. The film stars William Bishop, Gloria Henry, Edgar Buchanan, Forrest Tucker, Edgar Barrier and Irving Bacon. The film was released on March 25, 1948, by Columbia Pictures.

== Cast ==
- William Bishop as Bill Foss
- Gloria Henry as Jeannie Manning
- Edgar Buchanan as Dr. H. C. Henderson
- Forrest Tucker as Zeke Butler
- Edgar Barrier as Robert Louis Stevenson
- Irving Bacon as Jake Willis
- Joseph Crehan as E.J. McHugh
- Paul E. Burns as Sam Perkins
- Patti Brady as Lucy
- Fred F. Sears as Hatfield
- Joe Wong as Tim Quong
- Charles Cane as Sheriff
- Eddy Waller as Will Thatcher
- Netta Packer as Mrs. Thatcher
- Trevor Bardette as Mike
