= Virginia Patton =

American actress (1925–2022)

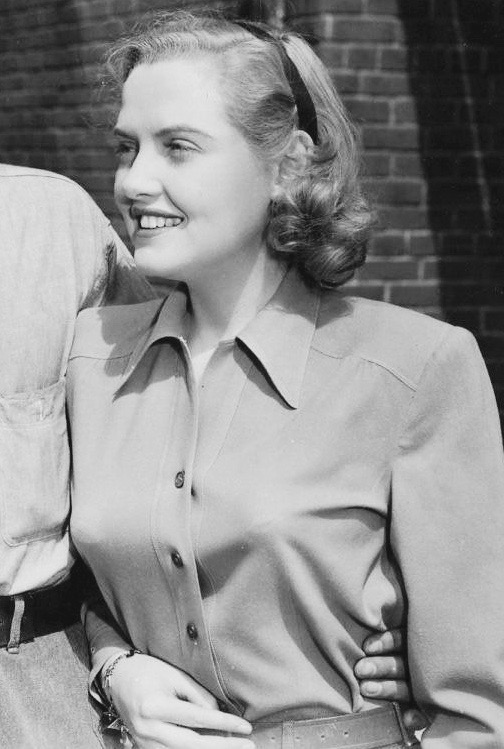
- Patton in Black Eagle (1948)
- Born: Virginia Ann Marie Patton; June 25, 1925; Cleveland, Ohio, U.S.
- Died: August 18, 2022 (aged 97); Albany, Georgia, U.S.
- Education: University of Southern California; University of Michigan
- Occupation: Actress
- Years active: 1943–1949
- Known for: It's a Wonderful Life
- Spouse: Cruse Moss (m. 1949; died 2018)
- Relatives: General George Smith Patton Jr. (granduncle)

Virginia Ann Marie Patton Moss (June 25, 1925 – August 18, 2022) was an American actress. After appearing in several films in the early 1940s, she was cast in her most well-known role as Ruth Dakin Bailey in Frank Capra's It's a Wonderful Life (1946). In 1949, Patton retired from acting, and her final film credit was The Lucky Stiff (1949).

== Early life ==
Virginia Patton was born in Cleveland, Ohio on June 25, 1925, to Marie (née Cain) and Donald Patton.

She was raised in her father's hometown of Portland, Oregon, where her family moved when she was an infant.

She was a great-niece of General George S. Patton Jr.

Patton graduated from Jefferson High School in Portland, and then moved to Los Angeles, California, where she attended the University of Southern California.

== Career ==
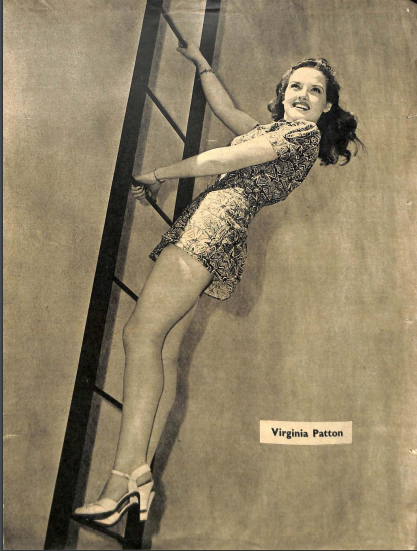
Pin-up photo of Patton for Yank, the Army Weekly in 1943

While a student at USC, Patton began to audition for acting parts. She collaborated in plays with screenwriter William C. DeMille while in college. She had several minor supporting film appearances before being cast in Capra's It's a Wonderful Life (1946) as Ruth Dakin Bailey, the wife of George Bailey's younger brother Harry.

Although Capra did not know Patton personally, she read the role for him, and he signed her to a contract. Patton later said that she was the only girl the famous director ever signed in his entire career. Patton still gave interviews about It's a Wonderful Life, and she was the last surviving credited member of the adult actors in the film (a number of child actors are still alive).

Patton made only four films after It's a Wonderful Life, including her first lead in the B-Western Black Eagle (1948). She appeared in the drama The Burning Cross (1946), a film about a World War II veteran who becomes embroiled with the Ku Klux Klan upon returning to his hometown.

== Personal life ==
Patton was married to Cruse W. Moss from 1949 until his death in 2018. She gave up acting in the late 1940s to concentrate on raising a family with her husband in Ann Arbor, Michigan. She later attended the University of Michigan.

Virginia Patton Moss served as the president of the Patton Corporation, an Ann Arbor-based real estate investment and holdings company. For over 25 years, she was a docent at the University of Michigan Museum of Art. She also served on the boards of the U-M’s Kelsey Museum of Archaeology and the U-M’s Stearns Collection of Musical Instruments. In addition, she was a member of the Board of Trustees of Cleary College (later University), a business school in Ann Arbor/ Ypsilanti, and she received an honorary Doctor of Science degree from Cleary.

== Death ==
Patton died on August 18, 2022, at age 97.

== Filmography ==
Year	Title	Role	Notes
1943	Thank Your Lucky Stars	Girl in Ann Sheridan Number	uncredited
1943	Old Acquaintance	College Girl	uncredited
1944	Roaring Guns	Karen Ferris	short film
1944	Grandfather's Follies		short film
1944	Janie	Carrie Lou	
1944	The Last Ride	Hazel Dale	uncredited
1944	Hollywood Canteen	Junior Hostess	uncredited
1945	The Horn Blows at Midnight	Party Girl	uncredited
1946	Canyon Passage	Liza Stone / Bartlett	uncredited
1946	Nobody Lives Forever	Switchboard Operator	uncredited
1946	It's a Wonderful Life	Ruth Dakin Bailey	
1947	The Burning Cross	Doris Green	
1947	A Double Life	Actress onstage in Othello	
1948	Black Eagle	Ginny Long	
1949	The Lucky Stiff	Millie Dale	
