= Play Girl (1941 film) =

1941 film by Frank Woodruff

- Theatrical release poster
- Directed by: Frank Woodruff
- Screenplay by: Jerome Cady
- Produced by: Cliff Reid
- Starring: Kay Francis; James Ellison; Nigel Bruce
- Cinematography: Nicholas Musuraca
- Edited by: Harry Marker
- Music by: Paul Sawtell
- Production company: RKO Radio Pictures
- Distributed by: RKO Radio Pictures
- Release date: March 7, 1941 (US)
- Running time: 76 minutes
- Country: United States
- Language: English

Play Girl is a 1941 American romantic comedy film directed by Frank Woodruff and starring Kay Francis as an aging gold digger who decides to pass on her skills to a young protégée, and featuring James Ellison, Mildred Coles, Nigel Bruce, Margaret Hamilton and Katherine Alexander. It was produced and distributed by RKO Pictures.

== Plot ==
Grace Herbert is a woman in her 40s who has made her living from seducing wealthy men and suing them for breach of promise. At the end of her finances, she and her maid, Josie head to Miami where Grace hopes to find another rich man. When that plan falls through, she stumbles upon Ellen Daley, a young woman who is looking for a job as a secretary. Instead, Grace decide to make the girl her protege and teach her how to make money leading older wealthier men on for money.

They leave for Chicago, and on the way meet Tom Dice when he fixes their flat tire. All they know is that he's a cowboy, and while Ellen is attracted to him, Grace dismisses him. Grace introduces Ellen to Bill Vincent, a vain man who likes younger women. Grace coaches Ellen on exactly how to lead a man on enough to get expensive presents from him, including a fat settlement to avoid a lawsuit. Despite some initial misgivings, Ellen begins to enjoy her role.

After they are finished with Vincent in Chicago, the ladies move on to New York City and Van Payson, another older wealthy man who is happy to squire a much younger woman. While out on a date, Ellen runs into Tom and the two of them end up sharing a cab when she gets separated. He makes arrangements to call on her, but Grace, who still thinks that Tom is "just a cowboy" criticizes Ellen for wanting to see him. After doing some research however, Grace finds out that Tom is a multi-millionaire and changes her mind. She encourages Ellen to marry him because of his wealth.

While Ellen is very much in love with Tom, she refuses to consider marrying him because of how she has been earning her gifts. When Tom proposes, she tells him that she needs to think about it for a day. That night she leaves a note for Grace and runs away. Grace decides that since Ellen is gone, she will try to run her old game on Tom.

In a men's club steam room, Van overhears Bill talking about his experience with Ellen, and the two of them realize that they were dealing with the same woman. When the two of them show up at her hotel and accuse her of running a scam, she turns the tables on them, accusing Bill and Van of defaming Ellen's character and finagling them into paying her outstanding bills. She then sends them on their way. As they leave, they justify their behavior to each other, reassuring themselves that they have not been taken for another ride.

In the meantime, Grace resumes her seduction of Tom and manipulates him into proposing to her. The next morning, Tom's mother pays her a visit, only instead of threatening to block the marriage, she just lets Grace know that she knows all about Grace's past, but will bless their marriage as long as she promises to always love and care for him. This moves something in Grace, and when Tom comes to visit, she tells him that she knows he still loves Ellen and he should go to Miami and marry her. He rushes out to get on a plane to find her.

Tom's mother tells Grace that Tom's uncle – who is also a wealthy cattleman – is in town alone, and tells her that he is a man who needs to settle down and marry a woman who can bring some femininity to his bachelor's life. When Tom's mother tells Grace that he is in the lobby of the building, Grace tells Josie her maid to have him sent up while she gets ready to meet him. As Josie helps her dress, Grace puts on the perfume she uses when she is seducing a man and says to Josie, "For the last time".

== Cast ==
- Kay Francis as Grace Herbert
- James Ellison as Thomas Elwood Dice
- Mildred Coles as Ellen Daley, Grace's protégée
- Nigel Bruce as William McDonald Vincent, one of Grace's former conquests
- Margaret Hamilton as Josie, Grace's maid and confidante
- Katharine Alexander as Mrs. Dice
- G. P. Huntley as Van Payson
- Kane Richmond as Don Shawhan
- Stanley Andrews as Joseph Shawhan
- Selmer Jackson as Fred Dice
- Marek Windheim as Dr. Alonso Corivini

== Production ==
Play Girl began with the working title of "Debutantes, Inc.". Both Sheila Ryan and Elyse Knox were considered for the role of "Ellen Daly", but RKO eventually got Mildred Coles, a former beauty queen, from Warner Bros. to play the part.
