= The Girl from Manhattan =

1948 film by Alfred E. Green

- Directed by: Alfred E. Green
- Written by: Howard Estabrook
- Produced by: Benedict Bogeaus; Lewis J. Rachmil
- Starring: Dorothy Lamour; George Montgomery; Charles Laughton
- Cinematography: Ernest Laszlo
- Edited by: James Smith
- Music by: Heinz Roemheld
- Production company: Charing Cross Productions
- Distributed by: United Artists
- Release date: October 1, 1948
- Running time: 81 minutes
- Country: United States
- Language: English

The Girl from Manhattan is a 1948 American comedy drama film directed by Alfred E. Green, starring Dorothy Lamour, George Montgomery, and Charles Laughton.

The guest house setting allows a multiplicity of characters to interact with the main characters.

== Plot ==
New York actress and fashion model Carol arrives to stay with her uncle Homer Purdy in a boarding house in the mid-west America town of Pittsfield.

Meanwhile, ex-football player, the handsome Tom Walker, appears in the same state to chat with the bishop regarding his becoming a minister in the town. It is concluded that the church needs new heroes and his background as a football star should be a benefit not a hindrance. The bishop has arranged for him to stay at Purdy's boarding house. On arrival he meets Carol and they recognise each other. Tom is cryptic about his plans.

Tom meets the church council who present a local benefactor Mr Birch who is going to buy the 150-year-old church and build a new church closer to the town centre: the chosen site is Purdy's boarding House.

Uncle Homer is revealed to be giving most of his rooms free until the various residents get rich, and is involved in many of their madcap schemes. He makes little money and the old house is crumbling. Carol and Homer rearrange one of the rooms to serve as Tom's study until the new church is built. They do not know the chosen site is their house.

The bishop calls in Tom to discuss his reputation if he's seen with a fashion model.

Oscar, one of the more eccentric guests, is allowed to build a miniature railway in Purdy's basement. Mr. Birch appears at the boarding house to assess its demolition. Everyone knows the plan except Carol. Uncle Homer has squandered the $3,000 Carol sent him on investing in his guests crazy ventures. The train engine blows up and Homer is injured. Tom and Carol join forces to save the boarding house. Several guests also start to raise money.

Ultimately Rev Tom sends his own $3,000 to pay off Homer's debts and Mr Birch's "generous" offer for the old church is proven to be a scam. Although they will need to keep using the old church, the bishop approves.

== Cast ==
- Dorothy Lamour as Carol Maynard
- George Montgomery as Rev. Tom Walker
- Charles Laughton as The Bishop
- Ernest Truex as Homer Purdy
- Hugh Herbert as Aaron Goss
- Constance Collier as Mrs. Brooke
- William Frawley as Mr. Bernouti
- Sara Allgood as Mrs. Beeler, the bishop's cook
- Frank Orth as Oscar Newsome
- Howard Freeman as Sam Griffin
- Raymond Largay as Wilbur J. Birch
- George Chandler as Monty the taxi driver
- Selmer Jackson as Dr. Moseby
- Adeline De Walt Reynolds as Old Woman
- Maurice Cass as Mr. Merkle
- Eddy Waller as Jim Allison
