= The Denver Kid =

1948 film by Philip Ford

- Theatrical release poster
- Directed by: Philip Ford
- Screenplay by: Robert Creighton Williams
- Produced by: Gordon Kay
- Starring: Allan Lane; Eddy Waller; William "Bill" Henry; Douglas Fowley; Rory Mallinson; George Lloyd
- Cinematography: John MacBurnie
- Edited by: Harold Minter
- Music by: R. Dale Butts
- Production company: Republic Pictures
- Distributed by: Republic Pictures
- Release date: October 1, 1948
- Running time: 60 minutes
- Country: United States
- Language: English

The Denver Kid is a 1948 American Western film directed by Philip Ford and written by Robert Creighton Williams. The film stars Allan Lane, Eddy Waller, William "Bill" Henry, Douglas Fowley, Rory Mallinson and George Lloyd. The film was released on October 1, 1948, by Republic Pictures.

== Plot ==
Border Patrol agent Lt. Fletch Roberts (Bruce Edwards) is lured into an ambush and murdered, the killers stealing a herd of horses and fleeing across the state line, where the Border Patrol agents can't follow. After Roberts' brother Tim (William Henry) is implicated in the murder, his best friend Lt. Rocky Lane (Allan Lane) goes undercover across the state line to find out the truth about the murder. Rocky poses as an outlaw to infiltrate the gang and find out more information. With help from Tim, local pharmacist Nugget (Eddy Waller), and his horse Black Jack, Rocky is able to track down the real killer and save the herd of stolen horses.

== Cast ==
- Allan Lane as Rocky Lane Posing as the Denver Kid
- Black Jack as Black Jack
- Eddy Waller as Nugget
- William "Bill" Henry as Tim Roberts aka Tom Richards
- Douglas Fowley as Henchman Slip
- Rory Mallinson as Jason Fox
- George Lloyd as Sheriff Howie
- George Meeker as Dealer Andre
- Emmett Vogan as Captain Stan Roberts
- Hank Patterson as Sergeant Cooper
- Bruce Edwards as Fletch Roberts
- Peggy Wynne as Saloon Girl Mitzie
- Tom Steele as Jeff
- Carole Gallagher as Barbara
