= Mildred Coles (actress) =

American actress (1920–1995)

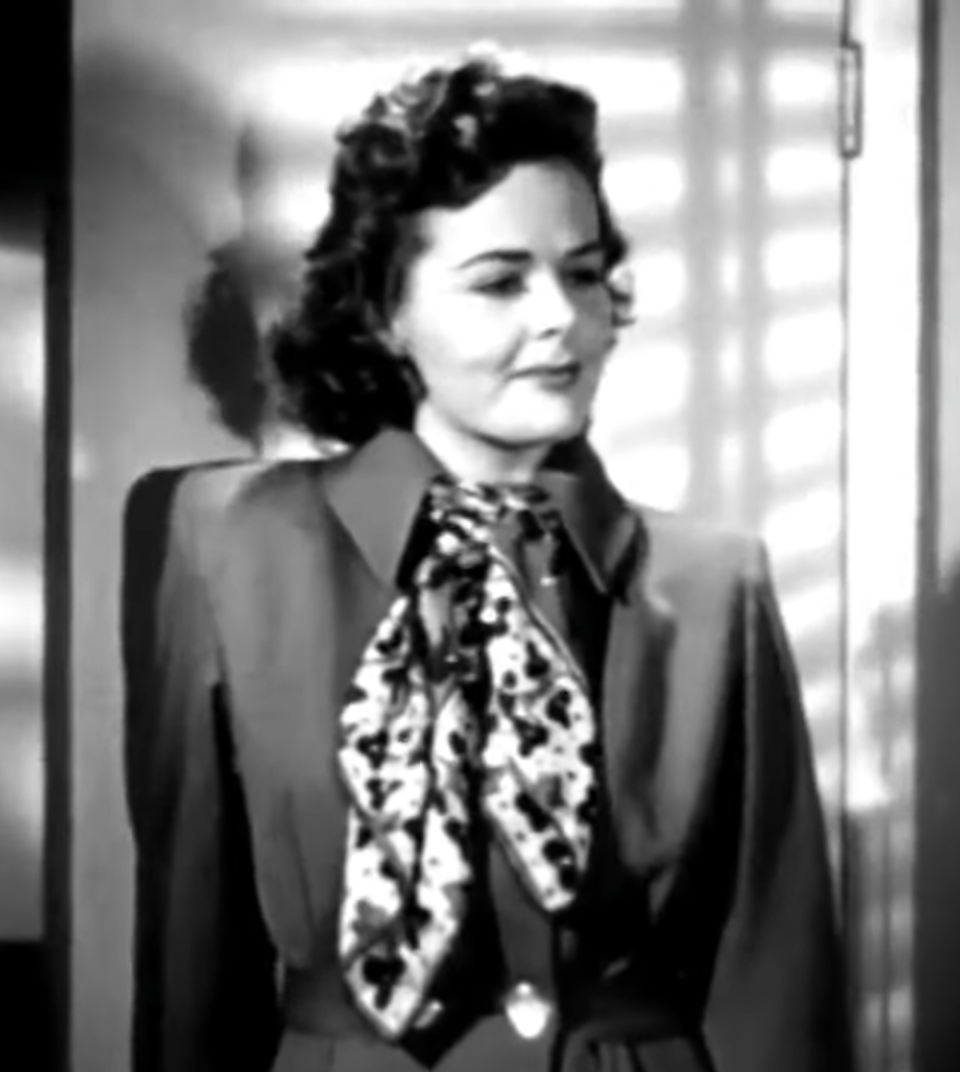
- Coles in Blonde Ice (1948)
- Born: Mildred Blanche Coles; July 18, 1920; Los Angeles, California, U.S.
- Died: August 31, 1995 (aged 75); Paradise, Butte County, California, U.S.
- Other names: Gloria Carter; Mildred Blanche Frost; Mildred Blanche Call
- Education: Van Nuys High School
- Occupation: Actress
- Years active: 1938–1948
- Known for: Hurry, Charlie, Hurry
- Spouse(s): John Rodney Frost (m. 1939; div. 1979) Mr Call (m. 1980)
- Children: 5

Mildred Blanche Coles (July 18, 1920 – August 31, 1995) was an American actress and former beauty queen, from Warner Bros.

== Early years ==
Coles was born in Los Angeles. The daughter of Thomas R. Coles and Josephine (Warrick) Coles, she graduated from Van Nuys High School and attended Occidental College.

== Career ==
Coles came to Hollywood after having acted on stage, initially working in two-reel comedies. She acted primarily in Western films, appearing in more than 20 films overall. Although she was known as a dramatic actress, she also sang and danced.

Coles was the leading lady in the RKO films Hurry, Charlie, Hurry (1941) and Play Girl (1941).

== Personal life ==
Coles was married to John Rodney Frost, an attorney in Los Angeles.

== Partial filmography ==
Year	Title	Role	Notes
1939	Andy Hardy Gets Spring Fever	Uncredited	Doria – a Student
1939	Our Neighbors – The Carters	Gloria Carter	
1940	Money and the Woman	Secretary at Bank	
1940	Ladies Must Live	Chorus girl	
1941	Play Girl	Ellen Daley	Grace's protégée
1941	Scattergood Meets Broadway	Peggy Gibson	
1941	Here Comes Happiness	Jessica Vance	
1941	Hurry, Charlie, Hurry	Beatrice Boone	
1941	Lady Scarface	Mary Jordan Powell	
1942	Sleepytime Gal	Connie Thompson	
1943	So This Is Washington	Jane Nestor	Marshall's Secretary
1948	Marshal of Amarillo	Marjorie Underwood	
1948	Oklahoma Badlands	Leslie Rawlins	
1948	Desperadoes of Dodge City	Gloria Lamoreaux	
1948	Bungalow 13	Hibiscus	
1948	Bob and Sally	Helen Cooper	
1948	Blonde Ice	June Taylor	
1948	Back Trail	Helen Frazer	
