= John F. Link Sr. =

American film director (1901–1968)

- Born: March 22, 1901; Alabama, United States
- Died: April 8, 1968 (aged 67); Los Angeles, California, United States
- Occupation: Film editor
- Years active: 1930–1965
- Children: John F. Link

John F. Link Sr. (March 22, 1901 – April 8, 1968) was an American film editor from the 1930s through the 1960s. Born in Alabama on March 22, 1901, he began editing in 1930. He began editing film shorts, and from 1930 to 1932 he edited almost 20. Link was given his first opportunity to edit a feature film in 1932, with Carnival Boat, directed by Albert Rogell, and starring Bill Boyd and Ginger Rogers. In his 30-year career, he would edit over 30 films, with the highlight of his career would be the 1943 classic, For Whom the Bell Tolls, starring Gary Cooper and Ingrid Bergman. Link, along with co-editor Sherman Todd, received an Academy Award nomination for their work on this film.

His son, John F. Link Jr., is also a film editor, and was also nominated for an Academy Award: for the 1988 film, Die Hard. Due to the similarity in their names, it is unclear as to when Link Sr. retired. The American Film Institute has combined both the father and son's career under one listing. The Internet Movie Database (imdb) has Link Sr.'s final film as 1958's, The Immoral Mr. Teas, directed by Russ Meyer, however Link Sr. was most likely, due to the dating of the films, also the editor on three additional films, 1961's The Sergeant Was a Lady, the 1962 film The Rape of the Sabine Women, and The Desert Raven in 1965. Link also directed two films, Devil's Cargo in 1948, and Call of the Forest in 1949.

Link Sr. died on April 8, 1968, in Los Angeles, California, at the age of 67.

== Filmography ==
(Per AFI database)

Editor
Year	Film	Director	Notes	Other notes
1932	Carnival Boat	Albert S. Rogell		
1937	Forlorn River	Charles Barton	First collaboration with Charles Barton	
1937	Thunder Trail	Charles Barton	Second collaboration with Charles Barton	
1937	Born to the West	Charles Barton	Third collaboration with Charles Barton	
1939	Geronimo	Paul Sloane		
1943	For Whom the Bell Tolls	Sam Wood		
1944	Up in Arms	Elliott Nugent		Uncredited
1944	Are These Our Parents	William Nigh		
1944	Black Magic	Phil Rosen		
1944	I'm from Arkansas	Lew Landers		
1944	Bowery Champs	William Beaudine		
1945	The Great Flamarion	Anthony Mann	First collaboration with Anthony Mann	
1945	Anoush	Setrag Vartian		
1945	Identity Unknown	Walter Colmes	First collaboration with Walter Colmes	
1945	Jealousy	Gustav Machatý		
1945	The Woman Who Came Back	Walter Colmes	Second collaboration with Walter Colmes	
1946	Strange Impersonation	Anthony Mann	Second collaboration with Anthony Mann	
1946	Queen of the Amazons	Edward Finney		
1947	The Pretender	W. Lee Wilder	Third collaboration with W. Lee Wilder	
1952	Gold Fever	Leslie Goodwins		
1958	Space Master X-7	Edward Bernds	Second collaboration with Edward Bernds	
1959	The Immoral Mr. Teas	Russ Meyer		Uncredited
1961	The Sergeant Was a Lady	Bernard Glasser		
1962	The Rape of the Sabine Women	Alberto Gout		
1965	The Desert Raven	Alan S. Lee		

Editorial department
Year	Film	Director	Role	Notes
1933	Song of the Eagle	Ralph Murphy	Assistant editor	Uncredited
1944	Knickerbocker Holiday	Harry Joe Brown	Supervising editor	
1946	The Glass Alibi	W. Lee Wilder	Supervising editor	First collaboration with W. Lee Wilder
1947	Yankee Fakir	W. Lee Wilder	Supervising editor	Second collaboration with W. Lee Wilder
1948	The Vicious Circle	W. Lee Wilder	Supervising editor	Fourth collaboration with W. Lee Wilder
1957	Escape from Red Rock	Edward Bernds	Supervising editor	First collaboration with Edward Bernds

Director
Year	Film
1948	Devil's Cargo
1949	Call of the Forest

Short documentaries

Editor
Year	Film	Director	Notes
1949	The French Peep Show	Russ Meyer	Uncredited
1955	Arizona Sheepdog	Larry Lansburgh	

Shorts

Editor
Year	Film	Director
1930	Pick 'Em Young	Monte Carter
1930	Red Heads	Frank T. Davis
1930	Live and Learn	Fred Guiol
1930	Big Hearted	Robert De Lacey
1930	Two Fresh Eggs	Monte Carter
1930	Mind Your Business	Monte Carter
1930	Two Plus Fours	Ray McCarey
1930	The Boss's Orders	Fred Guiol
1930	Breakfast in Bed	Fred Guiol
1931	Chasing Trouble	Fred Guiol
1931	Night Class	Harry Fraser
1931	Against the Rules	Arch Heath
1931	June First	Donald Gallaher
1931	Oh! Oh! Cleopatra	Joseph Santley
1931	Take 'em and Shake 'em	Roscoe Arbuckle
1931	The House Dick	Lloyd French
1931	Selling Shorts	Harry Edwards
1932	Dumb Dicks	Ralph Ceder
1932	Mother-in-Law's Day	Harry Sweet
1932	A Perfect 36	Ralph Ceder
1954	Stormy, the Thoroughbred with an Inferiority Complex	Larry Lansburgh

TV series

Editor
Year	Title	Notes
1957	The Christophers	1 episode
1957	Walt Disney's Disneyland	1 episode

Editorial department
Year	Title	Role	Notes
1955	Cavalcade of America	Supervising editor	1 episode

Director
Year	Title	Notes
1951−52	At Home with Billie Burke	—N/a
