= George Chandler =

American actor (1898–1985)

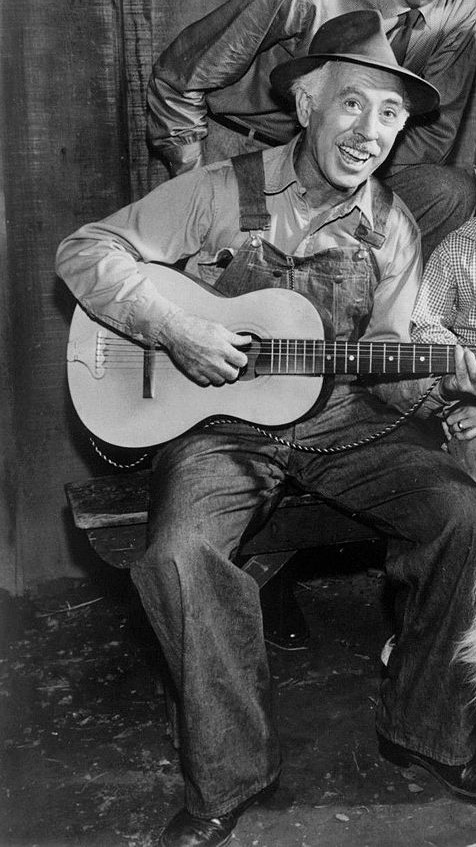
- Chandler in Lassie (1957)
- Born: June 30, 1898; Waukegan, Illinois, U.S.
- Died: June 10, 1985 (aged 86); Panorama City, California, U.S.
- Occupation: Actor
- Years active: 1928–1982
- Spouse: Catherine Ward (m. 1935; died 1963)
- Children: 3

President of the Screen Actors Guild
- In office 12 June 1960 – 8 August 1963
- Preceded by: Ronald Reagan
- Succeeded by: Dana Andrews

George Chandler (June 30, 1898 – June 10, 1985) was an American actor who appeared in over 140 feature films, usually in smaller supporting roles, and he is perhaps best known for playing the character of Uncle Petrie Martin on the television series Lassie, and as the unfortunate young man who drank The Fatal Glass of Beer in a 1933 short comedy starring W.C. Fields.

== Early years ==
He was born in Waukegan, Illinois, on June 30, 1898. During his infancy, his family moved to Hinsdale, Illinois. Early in his career, he had a vaudeville act, billed as "George Chandler, the Musical Nut," which featured comedy and his violin. He made his debut in film in 1929.

== Career ==
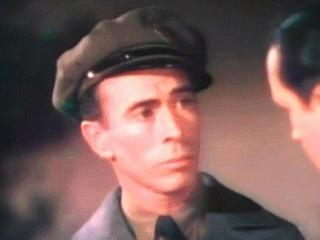
Chandler in A Star Is Born, 1937

George Chandler played minor roles in dozens of movies. Today's audiences may know him from the Mack Sennett comedy The Fatal Glass of Beer (1933) starring W. C. Fields. In this film, Chandler plays Fields's son Chester, the wayward youth who dared to drink beer in a saloon, causing his downfall. George Chandler played character roles exclusively, often in comedies: bartenders, shopkeepers, cab drivers, reporters, photographers, desk clerks, messengers, farmers, passersby, spectators—many times with only a few lines of dialogue. In Footlight Parade (1933), Chandler plays the druggist who sells Chester Kent (James Cagney) aspirin, and explains how the low price comes from the drugstore chain buying in large quantities, which starts off the premise of the movie. In Olsen and Johnson's Hellzapoppin', Chandler plays the cameraman on their film set, and reacts to the chaos with only four words of dialogue. In the Charlie Chan mystery The Shanghai Cobra (1945); Chandler runs an all-night coffee shop that becomes the scene of a murder.

== Television ==
Like many established movie character players, Chandler kept busy in the new field of television. Chandler appeared six times in The Adventures of Kit Carson (1951–1955) in episodes titled "Law of Boot Hill", "Lost Treasure of the Panamints", "Trails Westward", "The Wrong Man", "Trail to Bordertown", and "Gunsmoke Justice". He guest starred on The Public Defender. He appeared as the character Ames in the two-part episode "King of the Dakotas" in Frontier. In 1954–1955, he was cast in two episodes of the sitcom It's a Great Life. He appeared in the 1956 episode "Joey and the Stranger" of Fury. He was cast as Clay Hunnicutt in the 1957 episode "The Giveaway" of the sitcom The People's Choice.

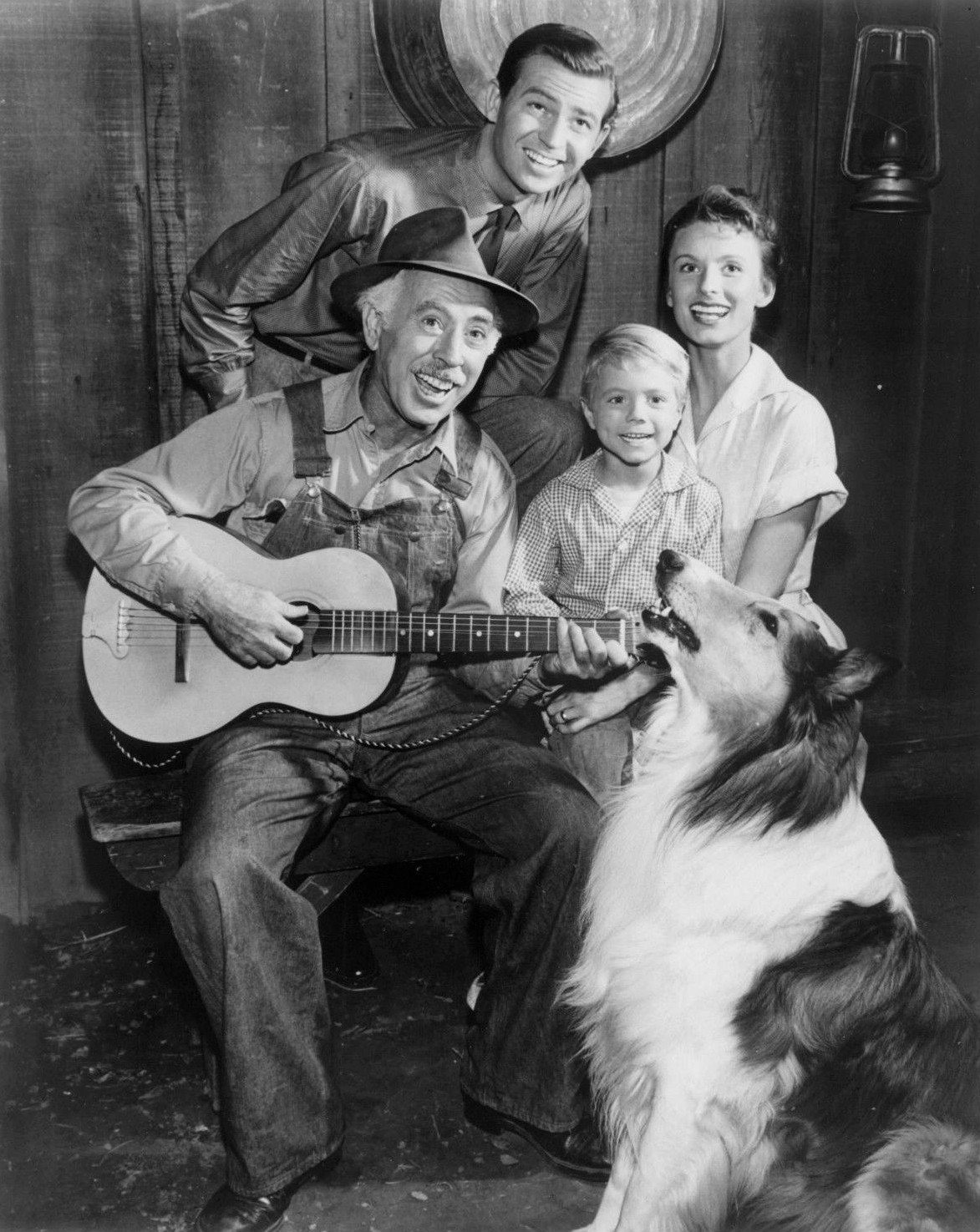
From Lassie, clockwise from top: Jon Shepodd, Cloris Leachman, Jon Provost, and George Chandler (1957)

In 1958, Chandler appeared as Cleveland McMasters in the episode "The Cassie Tanner Story" on Wagon Train. Also in 1958 he appeared in Wagon Train′s Season 1 Episode 39 "The Sacramento Story." In September 1958 he appeared on Decision in the episode "Indemnity."

In the 1960–1961 television season, Chandler guest-starred in an episode of the one-season sitcom Bringing Up Buddy and in an episode of The Twilight Zone, "The Whole Truth". In the 1961–1962 television season, Chandler co-starred in Ichabod and Me. In 1967, he appeared in an episode of the Western TV series Bonanza as Gus Schultz ("The Greedy Ones"). In 1970 Chandler appeared as Hawkins in the TV Western The Men From Shiloh, in the episode titled "With Love, Bullets and Valentines."

== Starring role ==
In 1956, George Chandler was cast as homespun philosopher Ichabod Adams in an episode of Robert Montgomery Presents entitled "Goodbye, Grey Flannel", and he reprised the role in 1957 in another Montgomery episode titled "One Smart Apple". In 1960, Chandler brought back the Ichabod Adams role in "Adams' Apples", an episode of General Electric Theater. It later became a full-fledged series, Ichabod and Me (1961–62), at last giving Chandler a starring role, a show of his own, and steady exposure. The series co-starred Robert Sterling and Christine White.

== Other professional activities ==
In 1960, Chandler was elected president of the Screen Actors Guild.

== Death ==
Chandler died in Panorama City, California, of cancer, on June 10, 1985, at the age of 86.

== Filmography ==
Year	Film	Role	Director	Notes
1928	The Cloud Dodger	Post Commander	Bruce M. Mitchell	
1929	The Kid's Clever	Hank		
1929	The Virginian	Bug Ears	Victor Fleming	Uncredited
1929	Devil-May-Care	Timid Royalist	Sidney Franklin	Uncredited
1929	Black Hills	Soopy	Norman Dawn	
1930	The Last Dance	Sam Wise		
1930	The Light of Western Stars	Slig Whalen	Otto Brower, Edwin H. Knopf	Uncredited
1930	In Gay Madrid	Enrique	Robert Z. Leonard	
1930	The Florodora Girl	Georgie Smith	Harry Beaumont	
1930	Manslaughter	Roadside Observer	George Abbott	Uncredited
1930	Love in the Rough	Taxi Driver	Charles Reisner	Uncredited
1930	Leathernecking	Bit Part	Fred Fleck (assistant)	Uncredited
1930	Her Man	Barfly	Tay Garnett	Uncredited
1930	Only Saps Work	Elevator Boy	Edwin H. Knopf	
1931	The Wide Open Spaces			Short
1931	Doctors' Wives	Dr. Roberts	Frank Borzage	
1931	Man of the World	Fred	Richard Wallace	
1931	Crashing Hollywood		Roscoe Arbuckle (as William Goodrich)	Short
1931	Everything's Rosie	Jail Guard	Clyde Bruckman	Uncredited
1931	The Back Page	The Aspiring Reporter	Roscoe Arbuckle (as William Goodrich)	Short
1931	The Lure of Hollywood		Roscoe Arbuckle (as William Goodrich)	Short
1931	Too Many Cooks	Cousin Ned	William A. Seiter	Uncredited
1931	A Holy Terror	Western Union Clerk	Irving Cummings	Uncredited
1931	The Woman Between	a Waiter	Victor Schertzinger	Uncredited
1931	Up Pops the Duke		Roscoe Arbuckle (as William Goodrich)	Short
1931	Sob Sister	Reporter	Alfred Santell	Uncredited
1932	Union Depot	Panhandler Wanting One Dollar	Alfred E. Green	Uncredited
1932	The Beast of the City	Reporter	Charles Brabin	Uncredited
1932	She Wanted a Millionaire	Hotel Worker	John G. Blystone	Uncredited
1932	The Famous Ferguson Case	Depot Loafer	Lloyd Bacon	Uncredited
1932	The Tenderfoot	Depot Bum	Ray Enright	Uncredited
1932	The Strange Love of Molly Louvain	Reporter	Michael Curtiz	Uncredited
1932	Is My Face Red?	Reporter		Uncredited
1932	Blessed Event	Hanson	Roy Del Ruth	Uncredited
1932	The Sport Parade	Pullman Ticket Agent	Dudley Murphy	Uncredited
1932	Afraid to Talk	Pete	Edward L. Cahn	
1932	Me and My Gal	Eddie Collins	Raoul Walsh	
1933	Parachute Jumper	Chauffeur	Alfred E. Green	
1933	The Fatal Glass of Beer	Chester	Clyde Bruckman	Short
1933	The Keyhole	Hotel Desk Clerk	Michael Curtiz	Uncredited
1933	The Mind Reader	Reporter	Roy Del Ruth	Uncredited
1933	Elmer, the Great	Cubs Player	Mervyn LeRoy	Uncredited
1933	Picture Snatcher	Reporter	Lloyd Bacon	Uncredited
1933	The Life of Jimmy Dolan	Boxing Handler	Archie Mayo	Uncredited
1933	She Had to Say Yes	Taxi Driver	Busby Berkeley	Uncredited
1933	The Power and the Glory	Board of Directors member	William K. Howard	Uncredited
1933	Bureau of Missing Persons	Homer Howard	Roy Del Ruth	
1933	Footlight Parade	Druggist	Busby Berkeley	Uncredited
1933	The Kennel Murder Case	First Reporter at Police Station	Michael Curtiz	Uncredited
1933	The World Changes	Piano Player	Mervyn LeRoy	Uncredited
1933	Son of a Sailor	Sailor	Lloyd Bacon	Uncredited
1933	Lady Killer	George Thompson	Roy Del Ruth	Uncredited
1934	Hi, Nellie!	Sullivan	Mervyn LeRoy	
1934	Dark Hazard	Soapy Sam Lambert	Alfred E. Green	Uncredited
1934	Twenty Million Sweethearts	Johnny Klinger	Ray Enright	Uncredited
1934	He Was Her Man	Highway Service Station Counterman	Lloyd Bacon	
1934	Fog Over Frisco	Taxi Driver	William Dieterle	
1934	Big Hearted Herbert	Murphy	William Keighley	Uncredited
1934	Happiness Ahead	Window Washer	Mervyn LeRoy	Uncredited
1934	6 Day Bike Rider	Abner	Lloyd Bacon	Uncredited
1934	Music in the Air	Assistant Stage Manager	Joe May	Uncredited
1935	The Woman in Red	First Reporter	Robert Florey	Uncredited
1935	While the Patient Slept	Evening Bulletin Reporter	Ray Enright	Uncredited
1935	Star of Midnight	Witness	Stephen Roberts	Uncredited
1935	Spring Tonic	Taxi Driver	Clyde Bruckman	Uncredited
1935	Front Page Woman	Reporter	Michael Curtiz	Uncredited
1935	The Murder Man	Sol Hertzberger	Tim Whelan	
1935	Don't Bet on Blondes	Henry Purdy	Robert Florey	Uncredited
1935	Broadway Gondolier	Photographer	Lloyd Bacon	Uncredited
1935	Welcome Home	Barber	James Tinling	Uncredited
1935	It's in the Air	Reporter	Charles Reisner	Uncredited
1935	The Payoff	Reporter	Robert Florey	Uncredited
1935	Mary Burns, Fugitive	Cashier	William K. Howard	
1935	Stars Over Broadway	Charlie	William Keighley	Uncredited
1936	Here Comes Trouble	Purser	Lewis Seiler	
1936	The Country Doctor	Greasy	Henry King	
1936	Speed	Bystander at Barn Dance	Edwin L. Marin	Uncredited
1936	The Princess Comes Across	Reporter for Transatlantic Film	William K. Howard	Uncredited
1936	Fury	Milton Jackson	Fritz Lang	
1936	High Tension	Man at Honolulu Dock	Allan Dwan	Uncredited
1936	Women Are Trouble	Reporter	Errol Taggart	Uncredited
1936	Sing, Baby, Sing	Hospital Intern	Sidney Lanfield	Uncredited
1936	Sworn Enemy	Lunch Stand Man	Edwin L. Marin	Uncredited
1936	Old Hutch	Cigar Store Clerk	J. Walter Ruben	Uncredited
1936	Libeled Lady	Bellhop	Jack Conway	
1936	All American Chump	Bank Clerk	Edwin L. Marin	Uncredited
1936	The Accusing Finger	Reporter	James P. Hogan	Uncredited
1936	Reunion	Jake		
1936	Pennies from Heaven	Waiter	Norman Z. McLeod	Uncredited
1936	Flying Hostess	Florist	Murray Roth	Uncredited
1937	God's Country and the Woman	Flunky	William Keighley	Uncredited
1937	Woman-Wise	Clerk	Allan Dwan	Uncredited
1937	Time Out for Romance	Simpson	Malcolm St. Clair	
1937	Fair Warning	Hotel Clerk	Norman Foster	Uncredited
1937	Nancy Steele Is Missing!	Counter Clerk	Otto Preminger	
1937	A Star is Born	Delivery Man	William A. Wellman	Uncredited
1937	Woman Chases Man	Taxi Driver	John G. Blystone	Uncredited
1937	They Gave Him a Gun	Taxi Driver	W. S. Van Dyke	Uncredited
1937	Charlie Chan at the Olympics	Ship's Radio Operator	H. Bruce Humberstone	Uncredited
1937	The Go Getter	Card Printer	Busby Berkeley	Uncredited
1937	Riding on Air	Barber Shop Hangeron	Edward Sedgwick	Uncredited
1937	Wake Up and Live	Janitor	Sidney Lanfield	
1937	Saratoga	Cameraman	Jack Conway	Uncredited
1937	One Mile from Heaven	Herman	Allan Dwan	Uncredited
1937	Big City	Mr. Briggs	Frank Borzage	scenes deleted
1937	Small Town Boy	Bill Clipper	Glenn Tryon	
1937	Hot Water	Photographer	Frank R. Strayer	Uncredited
1937	Danger as Love at Work	Attendant		
1937	Nothing Sacred	Photographer	William A. Wellman	Uncredited
1937	Thoroughbreds Don't Cry	Racetrack Usher	Alfred E. Green	Uncredited
1937	The Duke Comes Back		Irving Pichel	
1937	Big Town Girl	Red Evans	Alfred L. Werker	
1937	Checkers	Man at Racetrack	H. Bruce Humberstone	Uncredited
1937	Mannequin	"Swing" Magoo	Frank Borzage	Uncredited
1938	In Old Chicago	Onlooker	Henry King	Uncredited
1938	Man-Proof	Reporter	Richard Thorpe	Uncredited
1938	Mr. Moto's Gamble	Boxing Spectator	James Tinling	Uncredited
1938	Joy of Living	Taxi Driver	Tay Garnett	Uncredited
1938	Rascals	Patient	H. Bruce Humberstone	Uncredited
1938	One Wild Night	Bank Teller	Eugene Forde	Uncredited
1938	Three Comrades	First Comic with Singer	Frank Borzage	Uncredited
1938	The Shopworn Angel	Soldier	H.C. Potter	Uncredited
1938	Men with Wings	Cody	William A. Wellman	Uncredited
1938	Gateway	Reporter		Uncredited
1938	Three Loves Has Nancy	the Baggage Master	Richard Thorpe	Uncredited
1938	Valley of the Giants	Fireman #2	William Keighley	Uncredited
1938	Straight Place and Show	Cabbie	David Butler	Uncredited
1938	The Mad Miss Manton	Newspaper Man	Leigh Jason	Uncredited
1938	There Goes My Heart	Tailor	Norman Z. McLeod	Uncredited
1938	The Cowboy and the Lady	Reporter	H. C. Potter	Uncredited
1938	The Shining Hour	Press Agent	Frank Borzage	Uncredited
1938	Secrets of a Nurse	Dopey	Arthur Lubin	
1938	Up the River	Trustie	Alfred L. Werker	Uncredited
1938	While New York Sleeps	Piano Player	H. Bruce Humberstone	Uncredited
1939	Jesse James	Roy	Henry King	
1939	Boy Slaves	Deputy	P. J. Wolfson	Uncredited
1939	St. Louis Blues	Reporter	Raoul Walsh	
1939	King of the Turf	2nd Tout	Alfred E. Green	
1939	Blondie Meets the Boss	Laundryman	Frank R. Strayer	Uncredited
1939	Everybody's Baby	G. Randolph	Malcolm St. Clair	Uncredited
1939	The Flying Irishman	New York Airport Gas Attendant	Leigh Jason	Uncredited
1939	Calling Dr. Kildare	Elevator Operator	Harold S. Bucquet	Uncredited
1939	It's a Wonderful World	Photographer at Ferry Landing	W. S. Van Dyke	Uncredited
1939	Exile Express	Marvln McGee	Otis Garrett	Uncredited
1939	Young Mr. Lincoln	Loafer	John Ford	Uncredited
1939	The Jones Family in Hollywood	Hotel Clerk	Malcolm St. Clair	
1939	Second Fiddle	Taxi Driver	Sidney Lanfield	
1939	Mr. Moto Takes a Vacation	Cameraman	Norman Foster	Uncredited
1939	Beau Geste	Legionnaire Cordier	William A. Wellman	Uncredited
1939	I Stole a Million	Herbert	Frank Tuttle	
1939	Calling All Marines	John Gordon	John H. Auer	
1939	Everything's on Ice	Barber Who Takes Bet	Erle C. Kenton	Uncredited
1939	Mr. Smith Goes to Washington	Reporter	Frank Capra	Uncredited
1939	20,000 Men a Year	Soda Jerker	Alfred E. Green	Uncredited
1939	The Secret of Dr. Kildare	Pay Orderly	Harold S. Bucquet	Uncredited
1939	The Light That Failed	First Man	William A. Wellman	Voice, Uncredited
1939	Thou Shalt Not Kill	Johnny		
1940	The Man Who Wouldn't Talk	First Clerk	David Burton	Uncredited
1940	Abe Lincoln in Illinois	Minor Role	John Cromwell	uncredited
1940	Broadway Melody of 1940	Mr. Jones	Norman Taurog	Uncredited
1940	Forgotten Girls	Stoolie	Phil Rosen	Uncredited
1940	Shooting High	Charles Pritchard	Alfred E. Green	
1940	Edison, the Man	Gold Exchange Clerk	Clarence Brown	Uncredited
1940	Manhattan Heartbeat	Hawker	David Burton	Uncredited
1940	The Return of Frank James	Roy	Fritz Lang	
1940	Dr. Kildare Goes Home	Parkersville Counterman	Harold S. Bucquet	Uncredited
1940	Melody Ranch	Taxi Driver	Joseph Santley	Uncredited
1940	Arizona	Haley	Wesley Ruggles	
1940	Charter Pilot	Sound Man	Eugene Forde	Uncredited
1940	Trail of the Vigilantes	Railroad Station Attendant		Uncredited
1941	Western Union	Herb	Fritz Lang	
1941	The Mad Doctor	Elevator Operator	Tim Whelan	Uncredited
1941	Tobacco Road	Clerk	John Ford	
1941	A Girl, a Guy and a Gob	Bystander Betting Five Bucks	Richard Wallace	Uncredited
1941	Sleepers West	Yokel	Eugene Forde	Uncredited
1941	Double Date	Attendant	Glenn Tryon	
1941	Repent at Leisure	Bus Conductor	Frank Woodruff	Uncredited
1941	Model Wife	Joe	Leigh Jason	Uncredited
1941	Reaching for the Sun	Jerry	William A. Wellman	
1941	Broadway Limited	Photographer at Train	Gordon Douglas	Uncredited
1941	Mountain Moonlight	Steve Brown	Nick Grinde	
1941	Three Sons o' Guns	The Tailor	Benjamin Stoloff	Uncredited
1941	Private Nurse	Messenger Boy	David Burton	
1941	Man at Large	Country Cab Driver	Eugene Forde	Uncredited
1941	Buy Me That Town	Smedley, Son-In-Law	Eugene Forde	
1941	Miss Polly	Townsman	Fred Guiol	Uncredited
1941	Look Who's Laughing	Alex	Allan Dwan	Scenes deleted
1941	Hellzapoppin'	Movie Cameraman	H. C. Potter; Edward F. Cline (additional comedy scenes)	Uncredited
1941	Remember the Day	Telegraph clerk	Henry King	
1941	Design for Scandal	First Taxi Driver	Norman Taurog	Uncredited
1942	Call Out the Marines	Freddie	William Hamilton	Uncredited
1942	Obliging Young Lady	the Bellboy	Richard Wallace	
1942	Castle in the Desert	Bus Driver	Harry Lachman	Uncredited
1942	A Tragedy at Midnight	Elevator Operator	Joseph Santley	Uncredited
1942	Roxie Hart	Amos Hart	William Wellman	
1942	The Great Man's Lady	Forbes	William A. Wellman	Uncredited
1942	Private Buckaroo	Enlistment Sergeant	Edward F. Cline	Uncredited
1942	Are Husbands Necessary?	Mover		Uncredited
1942	Night in New Orleans	Taxi Driver	William Clemens	Uncredited
1942	Pardon My Sarong	George Peabody	Erle C. Kenton	Uncredited
1942	Isle of Missing Men	Bar Steward	Richard Oswald	
1942	Highways by Night	Gas Station Attendant	Peter Godfrey	Uncredited
1942	Here We Go Again	Waiter	Allan Dwan	Uncredited
1942	The Forest Rangers	Keystone Cop	George Marshall	Uncredited
1942	Scattergood Survives a Murder	Sam Caldwell	Christy Cabanne	
1942	That Other Woman	Charlie	Ray McCarey	Uncredited
1942	A Night to Remember	Taxi Driver	Richard Wallace	Uncredited
1942	The Great Gildersleeve	Messenger Boy	Gordon Douglas	Uncredited
1942	Secrets of the Underground	Lynch the Hotel Clerk	William Morgan	Uncredited
1943	City Without Men	Chester	Sidney Salkow	Uncredited
1943	The Powers Girl	Harry	Norman Z. McLeod	Uncredited
1943	The Amazing Mrs. Holliday	Butler	Bruce Manning	Uncredited
1943	Hi, Buddy	Oscar	Harold Young	Uncredited
1943	They Got Me Covered	Smith	David Butler	Uncredited
1943	Lady of Burlesque	Jake, the Prop Boy	William A. Wellman	Uncredited
1943	Gildersleeve's Bad Day	Mailman	Gordon Douglas	Uncredited
1943	The Ox-Bow Incident	Jimmy Carnes	William A. Wellman	Uncredited
1943	Hers to Hold	Enlisted Man	Frank Ryan	Uncredited
1943	Swing Shift Maisie	Ann's Boyfriend's Friend	Norman Z. McLeod	Uncredited
1943	Sweet Rosie O'Grady	Reporter	Irving Cummings	Uncredited
1943	A Scream in the Dark	Reporter at Morgue	George Sherman	Uncredited
1943	My Kingdom for a Cook	Sam, Gas Man	Richard Wallace	Uncredited
1943	Swing Fever	Hamburger Vendor	Tim Whelan	Uncredited
1943	Never a Dull Moment	Man with Newspaper	Edward C. Lilley	Uncredited
1943	In Old Oklahoma	Man on Train	Albert S. Rogell	Uncredited
1944	It Happened Tomorrow	Bob	René Clair	
1944	Buffalo Bill	Trooper Clancy	William A. Wellman	Uncredited
1944	The Chinese Cat	Hotel Doorman	Phil Rosen	Uncredited
1944	3 Men in White	Attendant	Willis Goldbeck	Uncredited
1944	Since You Went Away	Taxi Driver	John Cromwell	Uncredited
1944	Johnny Doesn't Live Here Anymore	Charlie Miller	Joe May	Uncredited
1944	Allergic to Love	Joe	Edward Lilley	
1944	Step Lively	Country Yokel in Night Club	Tim Whelan	Uncredited
1944	Bride by Mistake	Armed Guard	Richard Wallace	Uncredited
1944	Wing and a Prayer	Sailor Assisting Projectionist	Henry Hathaway	Uncredited
1944	Tall in the Saddle	Saddle Maker	Edwin L. Marin	Uncredited
1944	Goin' to Town	Jameson	Leslie Goodwins	
1944	Irish Eyes Are Smiling	Electrician	Gregory Ratoff	Uncredited
1945	The Captain from Köpenick	Kallenberg	Richard Oswald	film
1945	This Man's Navy	Bert Bland	William A. Wellman	
1945	See My Lawyer	Herman	Edward F. Cline	Uncredited
1945	Without Love	Elevator Boy	Harold S. Bucquet	
1945	Patrick the Great	Bellhop	Frank Ryan	Uncredited
1945	Crime, Inc.	Bill the Cab Driver	Lew Landers	Uncredited
1944	It's in the Bag	1st Elevator Operator	Herbert Mason	Uncredited
1945	Without Love	Elevator Boy	Harold S. Bucquet	
1945	Captain Eddie	Heckler	Lloyd Bacon	Uncredited
1945	The Man from Oklahoma	Building Custodian		Uncredited
1945	The Shanghai Cobra	Joe, coffee shop proprietor	Phil Karlson	Uncredited
1945	Lady on a Train	Man Fixing Glasses in Two-way Mirror	Charles David	Uncredited
1945	Tell It to a Star	Al Marx	Frank McDonald	
1945	Strange Confession	Harper	John Hoffman	
1945	Pardon My Past	Cab Driver	Leslie Fenton	Uncredited
1946	Because of Him	Busboy	Richard Wallace	Uncredited
1946	A Guy Could Change	Gus, Photographer	William K. Howard	
1946	Little Giant	O'Brien	William A. Seiter	Salesman
1946	The Mask of Diijon	Diner Counterman	Lew Landers	Uncredited
1946	Strange Impersonation	Jeremiah W. Rinse	Anthony Mann	
1946	The Kid from Brooklyn	Reporter in Hotel Room	Norman Z. McLeod	Uncredited
1946	The Glass Alibi	Bartender	W. Lee Wilder	
1946	The French Key	Roomer	Walter Colmes	Uncredited
1946	Behind the Mask	Shrevvie	Phil Karlson	
1946	Suspense	Joe's Pal at Sandwich Counter, grey hat	Frank Tuttle	Uncredited
1946	Lover Come Back	Walter	William A. Seiter (as William Seiter)	
1946	Rendezvous with Annie	Sgt. Harrington	Allan Dwan	
1946	The Last Crooked Mile	Roller Coaster Operator	Philip Ford	Uncredited
1946	The Missing Lady	Shrevvie	Phil Karlson	
1946	Heldorado	Photographer	William Witney	Uncredited
1946	The Great Morgan	Roger the Valet	Nat Perrin	Uncredited
1947	Sinbad the Sailor	Commoner	Richard Wallace	Uncredited
1947	It's a Joke, Son!	The Groceryman	Benjamin Stoloff	Uncredited
1947	Dead Reckoning	Bartender Louis Ord	John Cromwell	
1947	I'll Be Yours	Tall Man in Phone Booth	William A. Seiter	Uncredited
1947	Suddenly It's Spring	Newspaper Photographer	Mitchell Leisen	Uncredited
1947	Saddle Pals	Pickpocket Dippy	Lesley Selander	
1947	Stork Bites Man	Bit	Cy Endfield	Uncredited
1947	The Secret Life of Walter Mitty	Mate	Norman Z. McLeod	Uncredited
1947	Magic Town	Bus Driver	William A. Wellman	
1947	Nightmare Alley	Hobo at Stan's Left Hand	Edmund Goulding	Uncredited
1947	Night Song	Bartender	John Cromwell	Scenes deleted
1947	It Had to Be You	Bus Passenger with Newspaper	Rudolph Maté	Uncredited
1947	Road to Rio	Ship's Valet	Norman McLeod	Uncredited
1947	Killer McCoy	Photographer	Roy Rowland	Uncredited
1948	The Judge Steps Out	Train Station Agent	Boris Ingster	Uncredited
1948	Reaching from Heaven	Bert Kestner	Frank Strayer	
1948	Alias a Gentleman	Curly Britt	Harry Beaumont	Scenes deleted
1948	If You Knew Susie	Reporter	Gordon Douglas	Uncredited
1948	The Miracle of the Bells	Max	Irving Pichel	Uncredited
1948	Lightnin' in the Forest	Elevator operator	George Blair	
1948	The Hunted	the Bartender	Jack Bernhard	Uncredited
1948	The Cobra Strikes	Night Watchman	Charles Reisner	
1948	The Pirate	Carriage Driver	Vincente Minnelli	Uncredited
1948	Silver River	Mr. Rice	Raoul Walsh	Uncredited
1948	Race Street	Waiter	Edwin L. Marin	Uncredited
1948	Hollow Triumph	Assistant	Steve Sekely	
1948	Sons of Adventure	Asst. Director	Yakima Canutt	
1948	The Girl from Manhattan	Monty	Alfred E. Green	
1948	The Paleface	Patient #1	Norman Z. McLeod	
1949	Knock on Any Door	Cashier	Nicholas Ray	Uncredited
1949	Homicide	Police Photographer	Felix Jacoves	Uncredited
1949	Adventure in Baltimore	Townsman at Brawl	Richard Wallace	Uncredited
1949	Canadian Pacific	Telegraph Operator	Edwin L. Marin	Uncredited
1949	The House Across the Street	Carl's Boss	Richard L. Bare	Uncredited
1949	Once More, My Darling	Motel Proprietor	Robert Montgomery	Uncredited
1949	Battleground	Mess Sergeant	William A. Wellman	Uncredited
1950	Singing Guns	Smitty the Piano Player	R. G. Springsteen	
1950	Perfect Strangers	Lester Hubley	Bretaigne Windust	
1950	The Next Voice You Hear...	Motorcycle Officer	William A. Wellman	Uncredited
1950	The Happy Years	Johnny	William Wellman	
1950	Triple Trouble	Squirrely Davis	Jean Yarbrough	
1950	Pretty Baby	Henderson	Bretaigne Windust	
1950	Kansas Raiders	Willie	Ray Enright	
1951	Disc Jockey	Peerless, Marley's Secretary	Will Jason	Uncredited
1951	The Whip Hand	Jed	William Cameron Menzies	Uncredited
1951	Across the Wide Missouri	Gowie	William A. Wellman	
1951	Westward the Women	Awaiting Groom	William A. Wellman	Uncredited
1951	Double Dynamite	Messenger	Irving Cummings	Uncredited
1952	Rose of Cimarron	Deputy Sheriff	Harry Keller	
1952	This Woman Is Dangerous	Dr. Ryan	Felix E. Feist	Uncredited
1952	The Narrow Margin	Accomplice Running Newsstand	Richard Fleischer	Uncredited
1952	And Now Tomorrow		Irving Pichel	
1952	Woman of the North Country	Harris	Joseph Kane	Uncredited
1952	My Man and I	Frankie	William Wellman	
1952	Somebody Loves Me	Stagehand	Irving Brecher	Uncredited
1952	The WAC from Walla Walla	Jud Canova	William Witney	
1952	Hans Christian Andersen	Farmer	Charles Vidor	
1953	Meet Me at the Fair	Deputy Leach	Douglas Sirk	
1953	Island in the Sky	Rene	William Wellman	
1953	Marry Me Again	Telegram Messenger	Frank Tashlin	Uncredited
1954	Rails Into Laramie	Grimes	Jesse Hibbs	
1954	The High and the Mighty	Ben Sneed	William A. Wellman	
1954	The Steel Cage	Shorty Lanning, Convict segment "The Face"	Walter Doniger	
1955	Apache Ambush	Chandler	Fred F. Sears	
1955	The Girl Rush	Kibitzer	Robert Pirosh	Uncredited
1956	Good-bye, My Lady	Reporter	William A. Wellman	
1957	Alfred Hitchcock Presents	Partygoer	Paul Henreid	Season 2 Episode 38: "A Little Sleep"
1957	Spring Reunion	Zimmie	Robert Pirosh	Uncredited
1957	Gunsight Ridge	Gus Withers	Francis D. Lyon	
1964	Dead Ringer	George, Chauffeur	Paul Henreid	
1964	Law of the Lawless	Martin	William F. Claxton	
1965	Apache Uprising	Jace Asher	R. G. Springsteen	
1966	The Ghost and Mr. Chicken	Judge Harley Nast	Alan Rafkin	
1968	Buckskin	Storekeeper J. Perkins	Michael D. Moore	
1970	One More Time	Bit Part	Jerry Lewis	Uncredited
1971	One More Train to Rob	Conductor	Andrew McLaglen	
1972	Pickup on 101	Pawnshop owner	John Florea	
1975	Brother, Can You Spare a Dime?			Documentary
1975	Escape to Witch Mountain	Grocer	John Hough	
1975	Capone	Robert E. Crowe	Steve Carver	
1978	The Bastard	Seadog	Lee H. Katzin	TV movie
1978	Every Which Way but Loose	Clerk at D.M.V.	James Fargo	
1979	The Apple Dumpling Gang Rides Again	Elderly Man	Vincent McEveety	Right outside the Police Office
