= Rita Gould =

American actress (1890–1981)

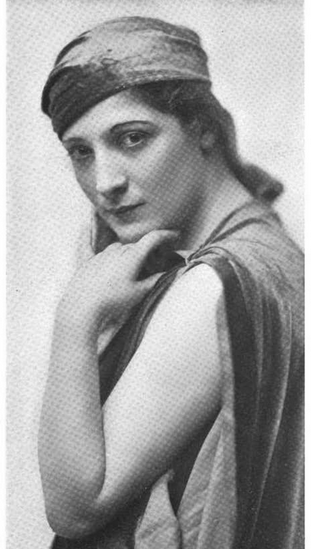
- Rita Gould, from a 1916 publication
- Born: August 8, 1890; Odessa, Russian Empire
- Died: March 15, 1981 (aged 90); Los Angeles, California, US
- Other names: Rita Gould Forest
- Occupations: Actress, singer, vaudeville performer

Rita Gould (August 8, 1890 – March 15, 1981) was an American singer and actress, born in Odessa. She performed in vaudeville in the 1920s, and in American films in the 1930s and 1940s. She was also known for her costumes and for the hats she made, and was a Christian evangelist in her middle years.

== Early life ==
Rita Gould was born in Odessa, in the Russian Empire, the daughter of Lazarus Rosenblum and Rose Bars.

Sheet music for "Send Me Away with a Smile" (1917), featuring a photograph of Rita Gould (inset)

== Career ==
Gould was a stage performer in the 1910s and 1920s, appearing on vaudeville bills across the United States, and in plays, including Maid in America (1916). She was known for popularizing the wartime song, "Send Me Away With a Smile" (1917). She toured in France for eighteen months with the Over There League of the YMCA, entertaining American troops during World War I, and afterwards at veterans' hospitals and events in the United States. In 1919 she gave a command performance for King George V and Queen Mary in London. In 1921, she toured with a song cycle written by Frances Nordstrom. "Always the actress with a dominant manner and a perfect enunciation," noted one reviewer in 1928, "she has lost none of her magnetism."

Gould's film career began in her forties, with roles in Kiss and Make-Up (1934), Girls' Dormitory (1936), He Couldn't Say No (1938), Red Barry (1938), So's Your Uncle (1943), South of Dixie (1944), Her Lucky Night (1945), The Vicious Circle (1948), and The Big Combo (1955). She was often heard on radio and hosted a radio program. She also took an early interest in televising revue-style entertainment.

Gould was known for her "striking costumes", including a "frock of tangerine-colored velvet" and another of "red and white checked taffeta". Her stage act in 1922 included making a turban-style hat on stage to wear while singing. In 1940, while living in Hollywood, Gould began making and selling crocheted hats and turbans "in unusual styles", sometimes with matching accessories.

== Personal life ==
Gould married several times. In 1930 she was involved in a scandal when fellow performer Natalie Chadwick accused Gould of stealing the affections of criminal Joseph Sheldon. She promoted the writings of Scottish evangelist Henry Drummond. She died in Los Angeles in 1981, aged 90 years.
