= Back Page =

Back Page or The Back Page may refer to:

- Back Page (film), 1933 American film
- The Back Page (film), 1931 American film
- The Back Page (TV program)
- Backpage, classified advertising website
