= Seven Were Saved =

1947 film by Pine-Thomas Productions

- Film poster
- Directed by: William H. Pine
- Written by: Julian Harmon (story); Maxwell Shane (screenplay and story)
- Produced by: William H. Pine (producer); William C. Thomas (producer); L.B. Merman (associate producer)
- Starring: Richard Denning; Catherine Craig; Russell Hayden
- Cinematography: Jack Greenhalgh
- Edited by: Howard A. Smith
- Music by: Darrell Calker
- Production company: Medallion Pictures
- Distributed by: Pine-Thomas Productions
- Release date: March 28, 1947
- Running time: 73 minutes
- Country: United States
- Language: English
- Budget: $225,000

Seven Were Saved (also known as S.O.S. Rescue) is a 1947 American adventure drama film directed by William H. Pine and starring Richard Denning, Catherine Craig and Russell Hayden. The film's opening title says: "This film is dedicated to the men of the AAF Air-sea rescue service, who risk their lives daily that others may live." Seven Were Saved was the first of a number of films that dramatized survival at sea after an aircraft crash.

== Plot ==
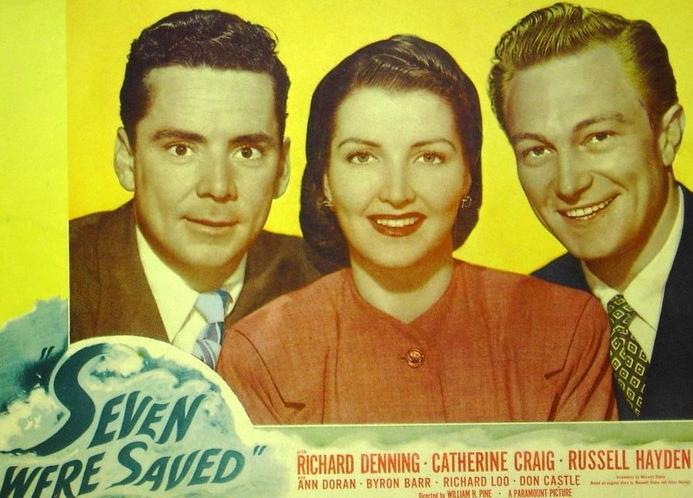
Lobby card with Russell Hayden, Catherine Craig, and Richard Denning

In 1945, several months after the end of World War II, Army nurse Susan Briscoe is taking an amnesiac victim, who was imprisoned by the Japanese, to the United States via transport aircraft, piloted by Captain Allen Danton. The passengers include the Japanese Colonel Yamura, who is on his way to Manila to face war crime charges. Also on board are the Hartleys, who married on the day they were liberated from a Japanese prison camp.

During the flight, the colonel tricks a guard and breaks away from his guards, grabbing a gun and shooting a crew member and the co-pilot. The colonel struggles with Allen at the controls and causes the aircraft to plummet into the sea. Once the aircraft is declared missing, Air-Sea Rescue pilot Captain Jim Willis, Susan's fiancé, begins a desperate search over the Pacific Ocean. He flies countless missions until, running a fever due to malaria, he is grounded.

The eight survivors of the crash have managed to inflate a life raft. After carefully assessing their situation, Allen, who has suffered a head wound, declares that they may have to attempt the 600-mile journey to the nearest island while hoping for rescue. In the first day at sea, Mrs. Hartley realizes that the amnesia victim, called Mr. Smith, is really her former husband, Philip Thompson, who was thought to be dead. The Hartleys now face a dilemma as they may not be legally married.

During the evening of the third day, Smith slips overboard without anyone noticing, but suspicion is cast on Mr. Hartley, who was supposed to be on watch. In the ensuing argument fomented by Yamura, the boat capsizes and the seven survivors fight for their lives in the ocean. After losing the sail and oars, the survivors realize that without food or water, their chances for survival are slim. When repairing a leak with chewing gum, Sergeant Blair is attacked by a shark, but Lt. Martin Pinkert jumps into the water to distract the shark and allow Blair to get back onto the raft.

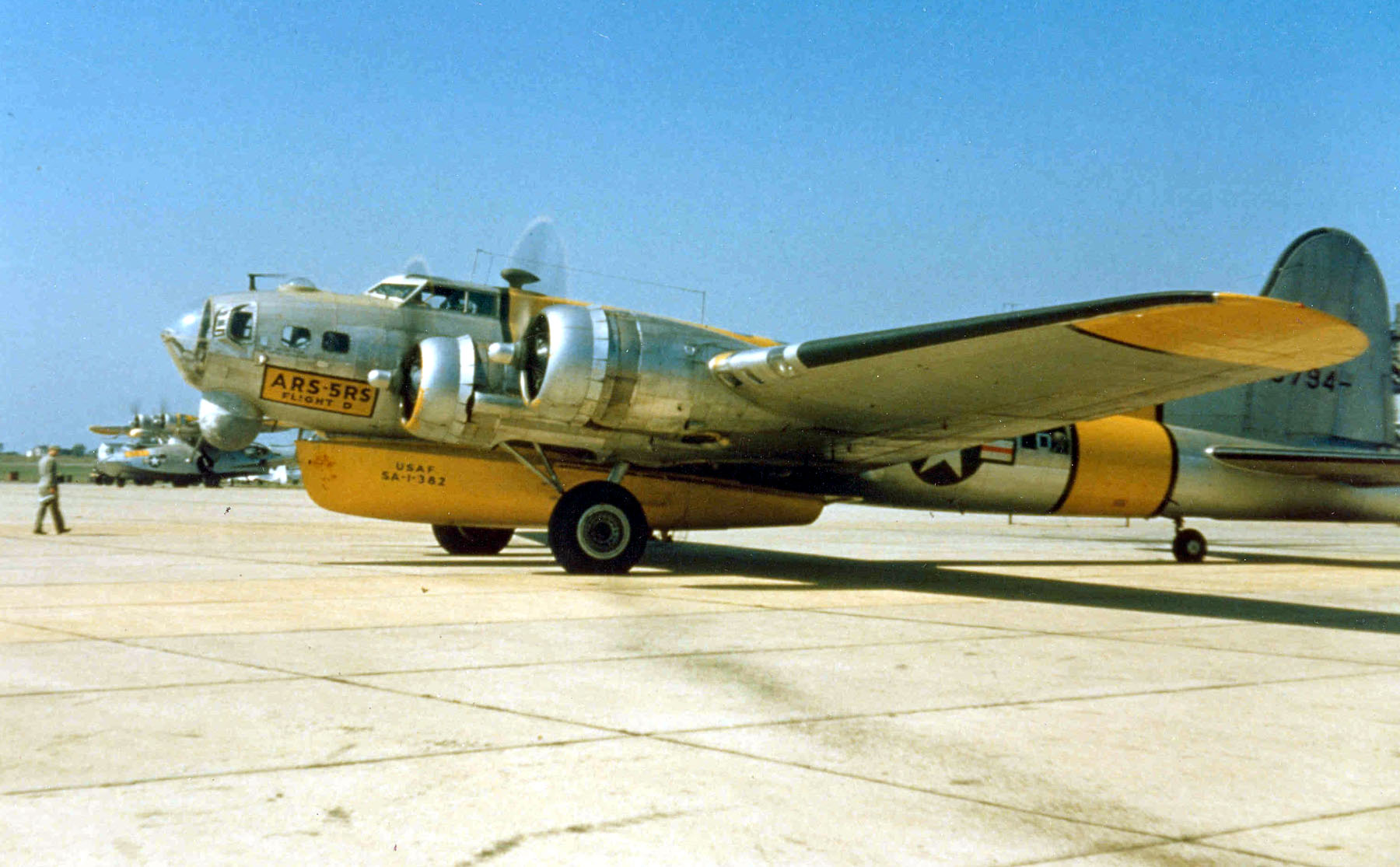
Boeing SB-17G "Dumbo"

On the fifth day, Susan discovers Allen has become blind from exposure to the sun, and the two conspire to keep the raft drifting on course. Air-Sea Rescue is about to cancel further searches when Jim sneaks onto a Boeing SB-17G "Dumbo". He locates the survivors, dropping a motorized boat nearby, but the seven in the raft are too emaciated and weak to paddle to the boat. Jim parachutes into the water, inflates a small raft and then steers the rescue boat to the life boat, eventually bringing everyone on board to safety.

The rescue is complete when a Consolidated PBY Catalina flying boat airlifts the survivors back to their base. While Jim thinks that Susan has fallen in love with Allen, she reunites with him as they both bid Allen goodbye.

== Cast ==
- Richard Denning as Captain Allen Danton
- Catherine Craig as Susan Briscoe
- Russell Hayden as Captain Jim Willis
- Ann Doran as Mrs. Ellen Hartley
- Byron Barr as Lt. Martin Pinkert
- Richard Loo as Colonel Yamura
- Don Castle as Lt. Pete Sturdevant
- George Tyne as Sergeant Blair
- Keith Richards as Mr. Smith / Philip Thompson
- John Eldredge as Rollin Hartley

== Production ==
Seven were Saved was completed with the full cooperation of the United States Army Air Forces (USAAF) Air Rescue Service. The technical advisor on the film was Capt Kenneth H. Brettman, USAAF. The Air Rescue Service was reorganized in March 1946 to become a division of the Air Transport Command. It was composed of several Air Rescue squadrons (ARS), each assigned to a specific geographical area. The 3rd ARS covered the Far East which serves as the backdrop of this film.

The producers hired a skeleton crew to film background footage for six weeks at a government air field in Mississippi.

The aircraft in Seven Were Saved were Canadian Vickers OA-10A Canso, Boeing B-17H/SB-17G "Dumbo", Douglas C-47B Skytrain, Curtiss C-46 Commando and Douglas C-54 Skymaster.

== Reception ==
Aviation film historian Stephen Pendo in Aviation in the Cinema considered Seven Were Saved as "part raft survival instructions, part details of the air search and part conflicts between the characters in the raft."
