= Brenda Marshall =

American actress (1915–1992)

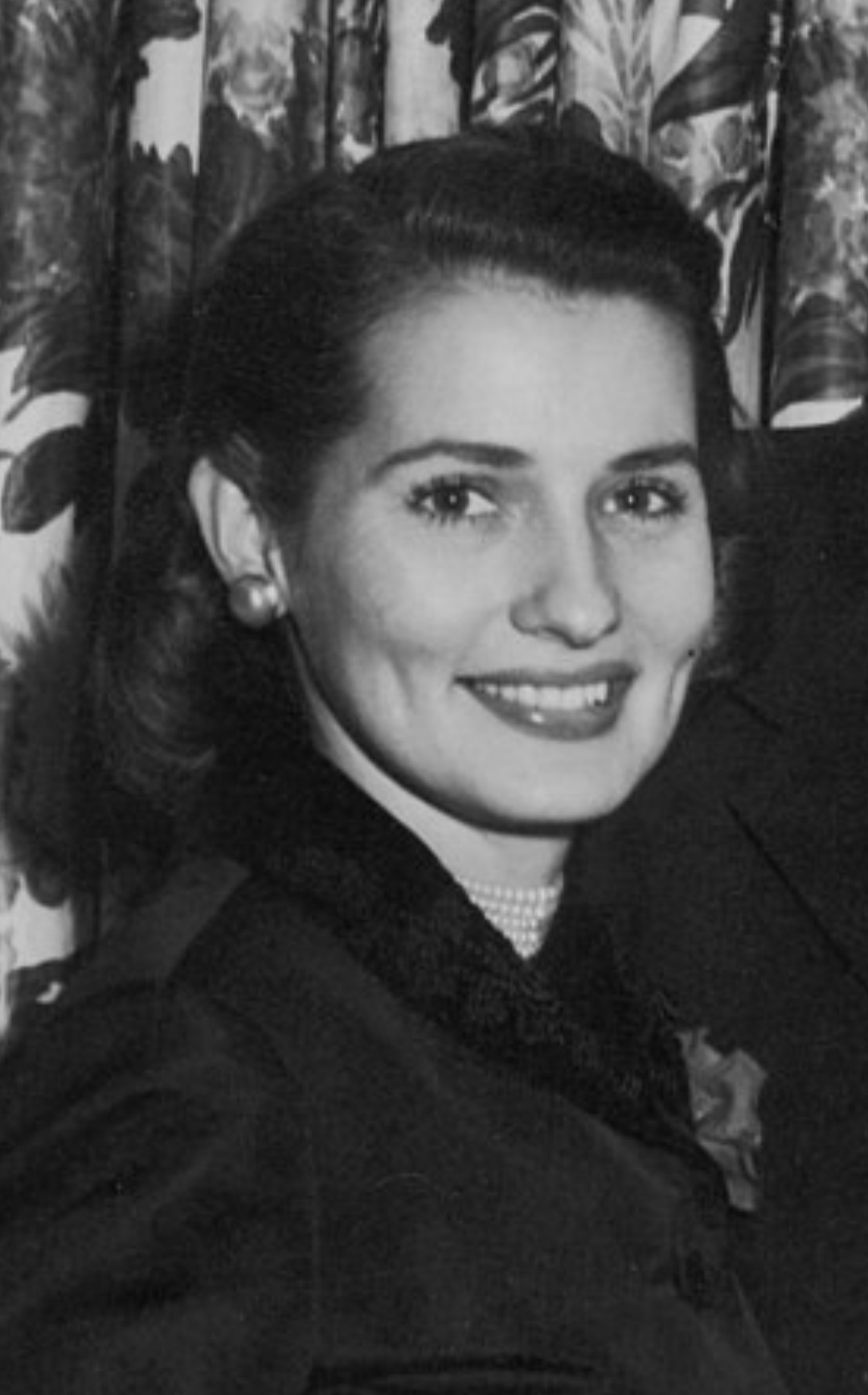
- Marshall in 1952
- Born: Ardis Ankerson; September 29, 1915; Negros, Philippine Islands
- Died: July 30, 1992 (aged 76); Palm Springs, California, U.S.
- Other name: Ardis Gaines
- Occupation: Actress
- Years active: 1937–1950
- Spouses: Richard Gaines (m. 1936; div. 1940) William Holden (m. 1941; div. 1971)
- Children: 3

Brenda Marshall (born Ardis Ankerson; September 29, 1915 – July 30, 1992) was an American film actress.

== Career ==
Marshall made her first film appearance as Ardis Gaines in Wives of Tomorrow (1937). Her initial billing as Brenda Marshall came in Espionage Agent (1939). The following year, she played the leading lady to Errol Flynn in The Sea Hawk. After divorcing actor Richard Gaines in 1940, she married William Holden in 1941, and her own career soon slowed. She starred opposite James Cagney in Captains of the Clouds (1942).

Marshall appeared in The Constant Nymph (1943), but she virtually retired after this, appearing in only four more films, including the Western Whispering Smith (1948). She also played scientist Nora Goodrich in the B picture cult film Strange Impersonation (1946). In 1955, five years after her last film role, she made an appearance as herself (billed as Mrs. William Holden) in the fourth-season episode of I Love Lucy titled "The Fashion Show".

== Personal life ==
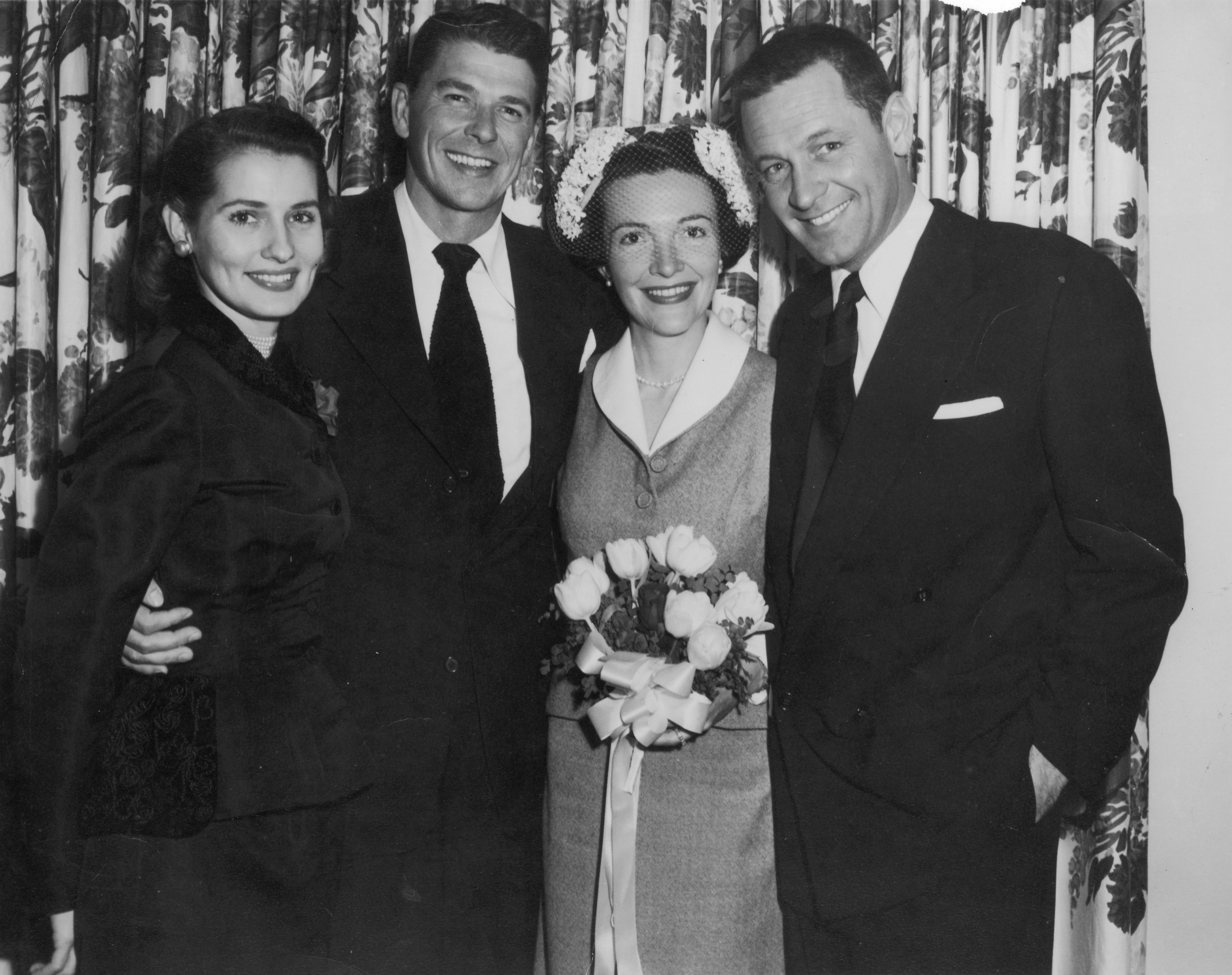
Matron of honor Brenda Marshall and best man William Holden, sole guests at Ronald and Nancy Reagan's wedding in 1952

Marshall did not use her stage name off set. She was one of two daughters of Otto Peter Ankerson, overseer of a large sugar plantation near Bacolod. Her mother died in 1925 when she was young, so Ardis, along with her older sister Ruth, attended grammar school and began high school studies as boarding students at the Brent School in Baguio. In the early 1930s, the girls were sent to San Antonio, Texas, to complete high school. She attended Texas State College for Women in her freshman and sophomore years, 1933–1935, and was named the Freshman Class Beauty in 1934, chosen by modern dancer Ted Shawn.

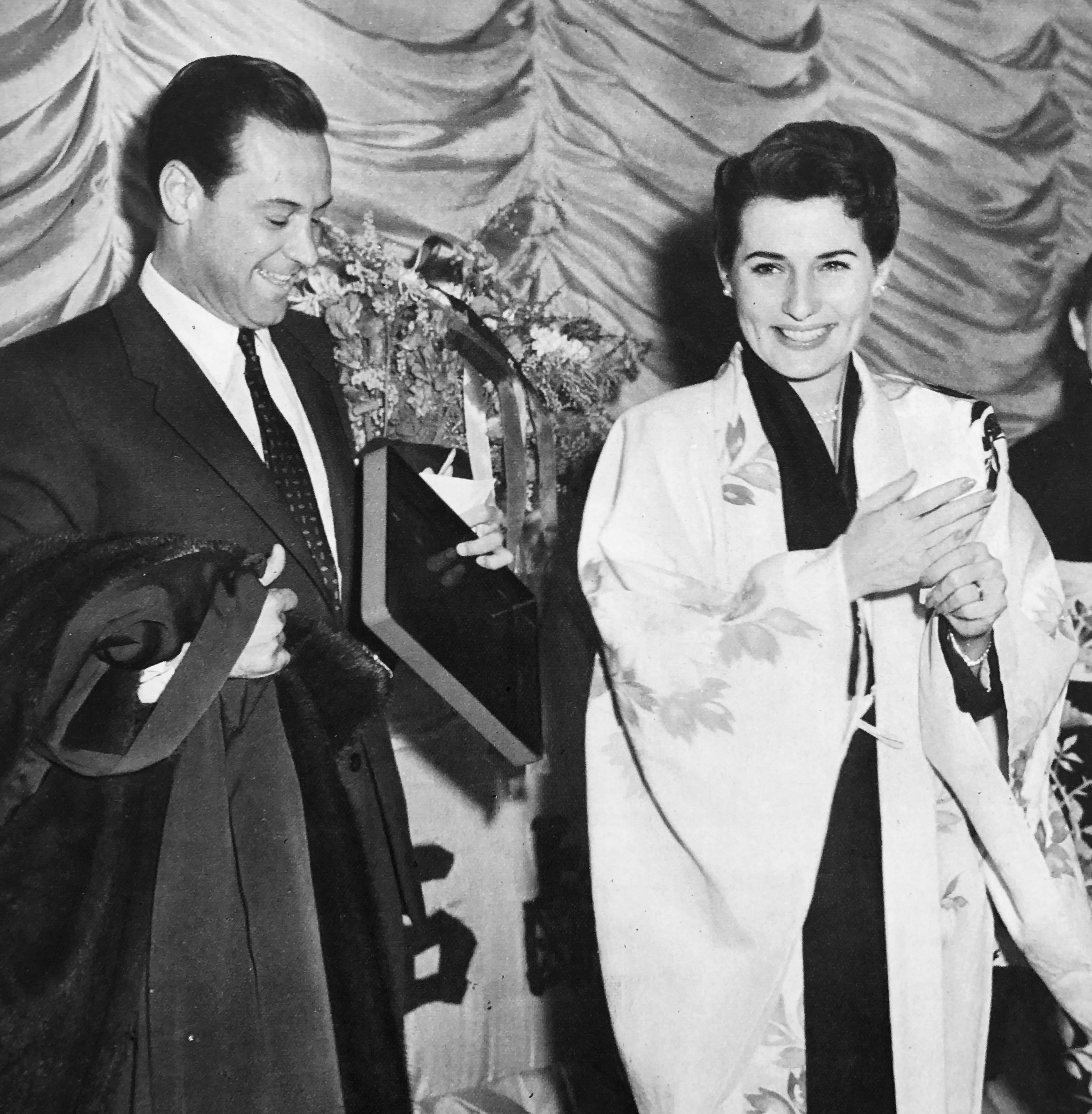
William Holden and Brenda Marshall at the Tokyo Theater in Chuo-ku, Tokyo in 1955

She married the actor Richard Gaines in 1936, and they had one daughter, Virginia Gaines (born November 17, 1937); the couple divorced in 1940.

In 1941, Marshall married actor William Holden, who adopted Virginia, and Marshall and Holden had two sons together, Peter Westfield "West" Holden (1943–2014) and Scott Porter Holden (1946–2005). After several separations, Marshall and Holden were divorced in 1971. Marshall moved to Palm Springs, California in 1971. She died in 1992 from throat cancer in Palm Springs, aged 76.

== Filmography ==
Year	Title	Role	Notes
1939	Blackwell's Island	Reynolds' Secretary	uncredited
1939	Espionage Agent	Miss Brenda Ballard	
1940	The Man Who Talked Too Much	Celia Farrady	
1940	The Sea Hawk	Doña Maria	with Errol Flynn
1940	Money and the Woman	Barbara Patteson	
1940	East of the River	Laurie Romayne	
1940	South of Suez	Katharine 'Kit' Sheffield	
1941	Footsteps in the Dark	Rita Warren	with Errol Flynn
1941	Singapore Woman	Vicki Moore	
1941	Highway West	Claire Foster	
1941	The Smiling Ghost	Lil Barstow	
1942	Captains of the Clouds	Emily Foster	
1942	You Can't Escape Forever	Laurie Abbott	
1943	The Constant Nymph	Toni Sanger	
1943	Background to Danger	Tamara Zaleshoff	w/ George Raft
1943	Paris After Dark	Yvonne Blanchard	
1946	Strange Impersonation	Nora Goodrich	
1946	Whispering Smith	Marian Sinclair	with Alan Ladd
1950	The Iroquois Trail	Marion Thorne	

== Sources ==
- Capua, Michelangelo (2009). William Holden: A Biography. Jefferson, NC: McFarland. ISBN 978-0-7864-4440-3.
- Gaines, Virginia Holden. Growing Up with William Holden: A Memoir (Strategems, 2007) ISBN 978-0-9741304-5-3
