= Catherine Craig =

American actress (1915–2004)

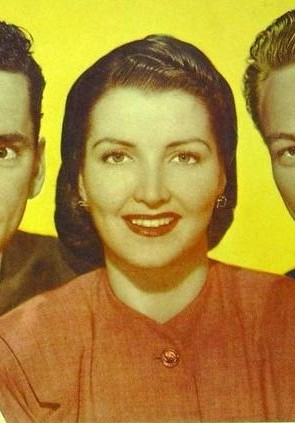
- Craig in Seven Were Saved (1947)
- Born: Catherine Jewel Feltus; January 18, 1915; Bloomington, Indiana, U.S.
- Died: January 14, 2004 (aged 88); Santa Barbara, California, U.S.
- Other name: Kay Craig
- Education: Indiana University
- Occupation: Actress
- Years active: 1940–1950
- Spouse: Robert Preston (m. 1940; died 1987)

Catherine Craig (born Catherine Jewel Feltus; January 18, 1915 – January 14, 2004), sometimes credited as Kay Craig, was an American actress.

== Early years ==
Catherine Jewel Feltus was born in Bloomington, Indiana, where she was a member of Phi Beta Kappa Society at Indiana University. She was recognized as the outstanding senior girl. She later moved to Los Angeles and became an actress under the stage name of Catherine Craig.

== Career ==
Craig was a student at the Pasadena Playhouse, and appeared in numerous bit part roles such as Las Vegas Nights (1941), West Point Widow (1941), Parachute Nurse (1942), Showboat Serenade (1944) and The Bride Wore Boots (1946). Later, she found more success in movies such as Seven Were Saved (1947) — her first leading role — The Pretender (1947), and Albuquerque (1948). After 1950, she retired from acting and supported her husband's career.

== Personal life ==
Craig married actor Robert Preston on November 9, 1940, in Las Vegas, Nevada. Craig died on January 14, 2004, aged 88.

== Filmography ==
Feature-length film credits of Catherine Craig
Title	Year	Role	Notes	Ref(s)
Manhattan Heartbeat	1940	Nurse	20th Century Fox	
Doomed to Die	1940	Cynthis Wentworth	Monogram Pictures	
Murder Over New York	1940	Stewardess	20th Century Fox	
Las Vegas Nights	1941	Girl with Bill	Paramount Pictures	
One Night in Lisbon	1941	Guest	Paramount Pictures	
West Point Widow	1941	Hilda	Paramount Pictures	
Nothing but the Truth	1941	Betty - Receptionist	Paramount Pictures	
Among the Living	1941	Second Mill Girl	Paramount Pictures	
Louisiana Purchase	1941	Saleslady	Paramount	
Parachute Nurse	1942	Lt. Mullins	Columbia Pictures	
You Were Never Lovelier	1942	Julia Acuña - the Bride	Paramount Pictures	
Salute for Three	1943	Canteen Hostess	Paramount Pictures	
Spy Train	1943	Jane Thornwall	Monogram Pictures	
Lady in the Dark	1944	Miss Foster	Paramount	
Showboat Serenade	1944	Girl	Short	
The Story of Dr. Wassell	1944	Mrs. Wayne	Paramount Pictures	
Fun Time	1944	Secretary	Short; Uncredited	
And Now Tomorrow	1944	Receptionist	Paramount Pictures	
Here Come the Waves	1944	Lt. Townsend	Paramount Pictures	
Incendiary Blonde	1945	Louella Parsons	Paramount Pictures	
You Hit the Spot	1945	Minerva	Short	
Love Letters	1945	Jeanette Campbell	Hal Wallis Productions	
Duffy's Tavern	1945	Nurse	Paramount Pictures	
The Stork Club	1945	Louella Parsons	Uncredited	
The Bride Wore Boots	1946	Mrs. Medford	Paramount Pictures	
O.S.S.	1946	Williams' Secretary	Paramount Pictures	
The Strange Love of Martha Ivers	1946	French Maid	Hal Wallis Productions	
Monsieur Beaucaire	1946	Duchess	Paramount Pictures	
Cross My Heart	1946	Reporter	Paramount Pictures	
The Perfect Marriage	1947	Julie Camberwell	Hal Wallis Productions	
Seven Were Saved	1947	Lt. Susan Brisoce	Medallion Pictures	
Sweet and Low	1947	Andrew Mather, Masquerade Party Hostess	Paramount Pictures	
The Pretender	1947	Claire Worthington	Republic Pictures	
Variety Girl	1947	Secretary	20th Century Fox	
Albuquerque	1948	Celia Wallace	Paramount Pictures	
Appointment with Murder	1948	Lorraine W. Brinckley	Film Classics	
El Paso	1949	Mrs. Elkins	Paramount Pictures	
No Man of Her Own	1950	Rosalie Baker	Paramount Pictures	
