= Bowery Champs =

1944 film by William Beaudine

- Directed by: William Beaudine
- Written by: Earle Snell; Morey Amsterdam
- Produced by: Sam Katzman; Jack Dietz; Barney A. Sarecky
- Starring: Leo Gorcey; Huntz Hall; Gabriel Dell; Billy Benedict; Bobby Jordan
- Cinematography: Ira H. Morgan
- Edited by: John F. Link, Sr.
- Music by: Edward J. Kay
- Production company: Monogram Pictures
- Release date: November 25, 1944
- Running time: 62 minutes
- Country: United States
- Language: English

Bowery Champs is a 1944 American film directed by William Beaudine and starring the East Side Kids.

== Plot ==
After she files for divorce from nightclub owner Tom Wilson, former Broadway star Gypsy Carmen demands that he return the securities that she owned before their marriage. When Wilson claims that the securities are missing, Gypsy pulls a gun from her purse and aims it at him. At that moment, a gun is fired through the window of his house. Tom falls dead and Gypsy flees in panic.

At the time of the murder, Jim Lindsay, star reporter of the New York Evening Express, misses the story because he is about to be married and is shopping for home furnishings. Deciding to cover the murder for the absent Jim, Muggs McGinnis, copy boy, takes his gang to the Wilson house in the paper's delivery truck. At the house, Muggs and Glimpy sneak through an open window and listen as the police interrogate Wilson's mistress, Diane Gibson, an entertainer at the nightclub, and Ken Duncan, Wilson's manager.

Jim hurries to the Wilson house to investigate. Meanwhile, Muggs, Glimpy and the other East Side Kids trail Gypsy, who is in hiding. Muggs believes Gypsy's account of the murder and keeps her away from the police by having her wait in the gang's clubhouse. Muggs discovers that Gypsy's gun is .32 caliber, and is not the murder weapon. Meanwhile, Jim finds a false clue that points to his boss, who fires Jim.

Muggs's pal Skinny has followed Diane to the Pussy Cat Café, where she turns Gypsy's stolen securities over to Duncan. Skinny summons the gang members, where they find that Gypsy has left the clubhouse for a showdown at the café. Muggs and the gang join Skinny there, and descend upon swindler Duncan and his men while Gypsy grapples with Diane. The police arrive to arrest Diane and Duncan, and Jim breaks the story about the closing of the Wilson murder case.

== Cast ==
=== The East Side Kids ===
- Leo Gorcey as Ethelbert "Muggs" McGinnis
- Huntz Hall as Glimpy McClusky
- Billy Benedict as Skinny
- Bobby Jordan as Bobby Jordan
- Gabriel Dell as Jim Lindsay
- Jimmy Strand as Danny
- Bud Gorman as Shorty

=== Supporting cast ===
- Evelyn Brent as Gypsy Carmen
- Ian Keith as Ken Duncan
- Thelma White as Diane Gibson
- Frank Jaquet as Lester Cartwright
- Anne Sterling as Jane
- Wheeler Oakman as Tom Wilson
- Fred Kelsey as McGuire
- William Ruhl as Lieutenant
- Betty Sinclair as Apartment Manager
- Francis Ford as Sports Writer
- Eddie Cherkose as Scoop
- Joe Bautista as Houseboy
- Bernard Gorcey as Mr. Johnson, taxi driver (uncredited)
- Jack Mulhall as Sgt. Ryan (uncredited)
- Charles Jordan as Desk Sergeant

== Production ==
In 1944 producer Sam Katzman was making feature films for the "budget" Monogram Pictures studio. He commissioned a newspaper-office set for Bowery Champs (which began filming on June 5, 1944 as Muggs Meets a Deadline). With the producer's typical thrift he retained the set and some of the crew members (as well as actors Billy Benedict, Wheeler Oakman, and Frank Jaquet) for Brenda Starr, Reporter, a serial Katzman was making on the side for Columbia Pictures.

While on leave from military duty, Bobby Jordan visited the set during its filming and he was written into the film (as himself) at the last minute.

The film marks Jimmy Strand's last East Side Kids film, while it includes Leo Gorcey's father, Bernard, as Mr. Johnson, the taxi driver.
