= Strange Impersonation =

1946 film by Anthony Mann

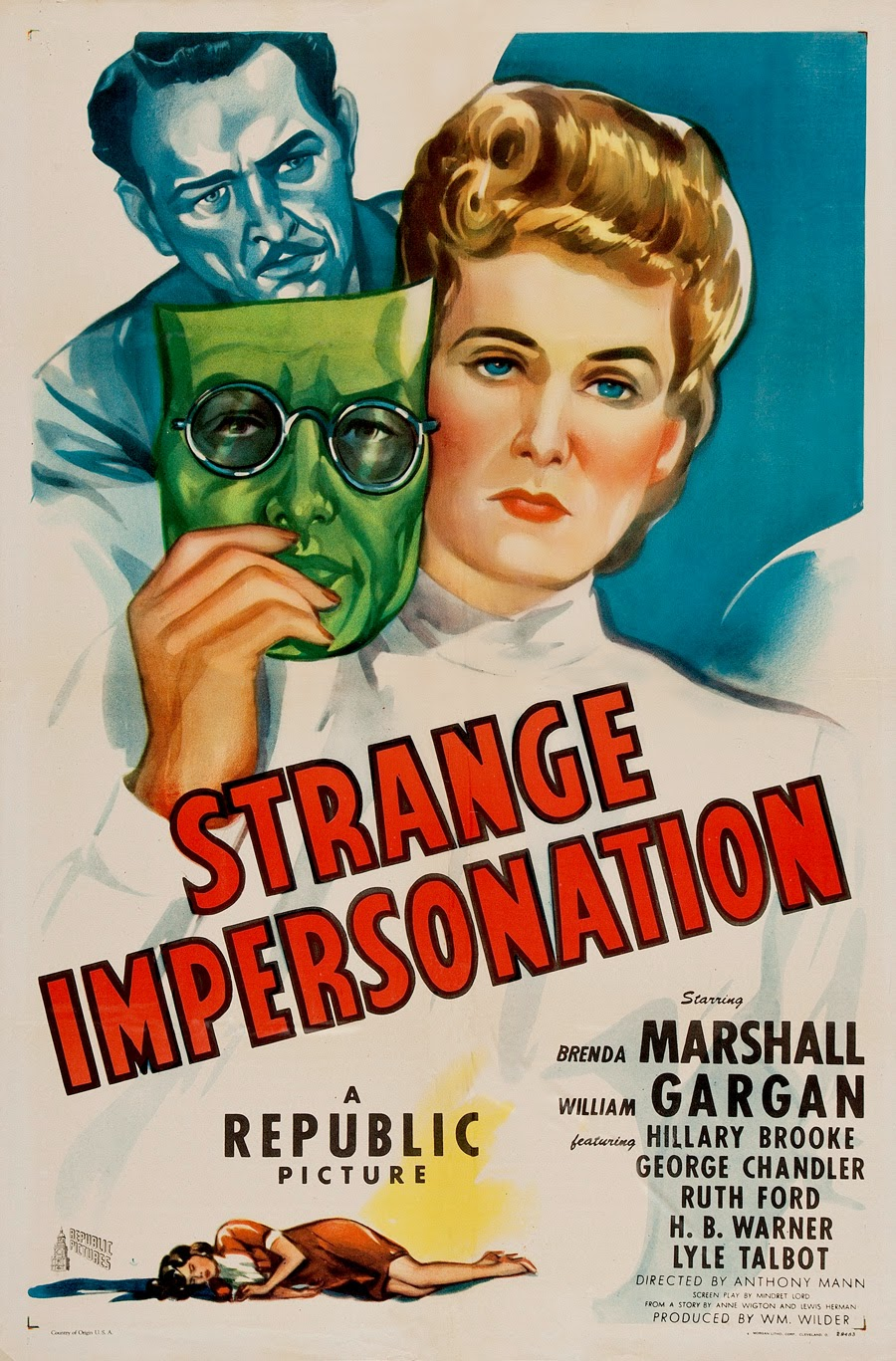
- Theatrical release poster
- Directed by: Anthony Mann
- Screenplay by: Mindret Lord
- Story by: Lewis Herman; Anne Wigton
- Produced by: W. Lee Wilder
- Starring: Brenda Marshall; William Gargan; Hillary Brooke
- Cinematography: Robert Pittack
- Edited by: John F. Link Sr.
- Music by: Alexander Laszlo
- Color process: Black and white
- Production company: W. Lee Wilder Productions
- Distributed by: Republic Pictures
- Release date: March 16, 1946
- Running time: 68 minutes
- Country: United States
- Language: English

Strange Impersonation is a 1946 American film noir drama film directed by Anthony Mann and starring Brenda Marshall, William Gargan and Hillary Brooke.

== Plot ==
The distinguished chemical research scientist Nora Goodrich is postponing her marriage to her fiancé, Dr. Stephen Lindstrom, though her assistant and best friend Arline Cole advises her not to put him off too long. Nora takes home the materials to test on herself a new anaesthetic she has invented, which she predicts will induce vivid dreams and hallucinations before putting the subject completely under. It is a volatile substance, liable to explode into flame if improperly handled. On her way home, Nora backs out of her parking space and knocks down a woman named Jane Karaski who walked behind the car; Jane is not hurt and acknowledges that it was her fault, but a sleazy ambulance-chasing lawyer named J.W. Rinse gives his card to them both and tries to stir up a lawsuit.

Nora prepares to take the anaesthetic, but Arline is seen to alter the amount. The mixture explodes and badly burns Nora. When Dr. Lindstrom comes to see her in the hospital and profess his unaltered love, she tries to send him away because she will no longer be beautiful, but he refuses to go. Arline then undermines their relationship by telling the hospital staff Nora does not want to see or hear from him, so that all his efforts to visit, call or send flowers are in vain, while telling Nora, who really does want him to come, that he is too busy to visit and doesn't really care for her. When Nora comes home from the hospital, disfigured but not blinded and with the prospect of restoration through plastic surgery, Stephen finally gets to see her, but Arline's work of alienation succeeds: they accuse each other of not caring, and part.

Right afterward, Jane Karaski shows up, primed by the lawyer Rinse to demand $25,000 for her tiny accident. When Nora refuses, Jane pulls a gun and starts grabbing all her jewelry from its box, demanding her engagement ring too and scooping up her papers. Nora tries to get the gun, and in their scuffle it goes off and Jane is shot and falls off the balcony. A crowd below, including Stephen, sees the body, its face obliterated by the fall, and thinks it's Nora because of the ring and papers. Nora sees this from the back of the crowd and decides to accede to being thought dead and start a new life impersonating Jane.

She goes to another city, where she spends a year and a half getting facial surgeries; but she shows the plastic surgeons pictures of Jane instead of herself to work from, so that when she is done she is beautiful again but looks like Jane. She reads that Arline has married Stephen, and she goes back to them and presents herself as an old friend of Nora's, who knows all about them from Nora's conversation. She gets a job in Stephen's lab, and as they work together Stephen develops feelings for her, saying that she reminds him so of Nora that he feels he can love again; his marriage to Arline was a mistake.

Arline confronts Nora as she is packing to leave with Stephen and work with him in France. It comes out that Arline sabotaged the anaesthetic and broke Nora and Stephen up with her lies, and that "Jane" IS Nora. At this point, the police show up with Rinse and arrest Nora for the murder of Nora Goodrich. When she tries to tell them who she really is and what happened, Rinse, her building receptionist and, acting in malice, Arline identify her as Jane. All accuse her of the murder of herself, and Stephen believes it and is horrified. Nora hysterically pleads her innocence as they threaten her with the electric chair.

At this point, she wakes up on the couch in her original apartment, with Stephen holding her and a friendly and harmless Arline standing by to tell her the experiment worked perfectly. All that she thought happened from Arline sabotaging the mixture on was just such a hallucination as she had predicted would happen with her anaesthetic. Relieved and happy, she proposes that she and Stephen get married the next day.

== Cast ==
- Brenda Marshall as Nora Goodrich
- William Gargan as Dr. Stephen Lindstrom
- Hillary Brooke as Arline Cole
- George Chandler as J W Rinse, plaintiffs' attorney
- Ruth Ford as Jane Karaski #1
- H.B. Warner as Dr. Mansfield, plastic surgeon
- Lyle Talbot as Insp. Malloy, chief interrogator
- Mary Treen as Talkative nurse
- Cay Forester as Miss Roper, interrogation witness
- Dick Scott as Detective

== Release ==
Republic released Strange Impersonation in March 1946, three months after it was approved by the Production Code Administration. Its West Coast performance was not as good as on the East Coast, which author Max Alvarez attributes to supporting a better feature in New York City.

== Reception ==
=== Critical response ===
Film critic Glenn Erickson is positive about the film, writing, "Strange Impersonation is a fun oddity, a female version of The Scar (Hollow Triumph) (or perhaps The Woman in the Window) but without an organized crime angle. It's the kind of Cornell Woolrich yarn that depends on an unlikely but entertaining twist concept. ... The future director of El Cid and a half-dozen landmark James Stewart westerns shows a flair for dramatic confrontations. Strange Impersonation never looks cheap even though its limited cast works in just a few sets. Not surprisingly, the underlying message implies that if professional women want to be happy, they need to stop working and marry." Writing in The Crime Films of Anthony Mann, Alvarez says, "Irrespective of his reservations and despite its unsatisfying conclusion, the picture is an ingenious and frenzied little thriller". William Darby, who wrote Anthony Mann: The Film Career, said that the film "uneasily moves between film noir and woman's picture with the latter tendency ultimately winning out."
