= Whispering Smith =

1948 film by Leslie Fenton

- Theatrical release poster
- Directed by: Leslie Fenton
- Written by: Frank Butler; Karl Kamb
- Based on: novel by Frank H. Spearman
- Produced by: Mel Epstein (associate producer)
- Starring: Alan Ladd; Robert Preston; Brenda Marshall; Donald Crisp
- Cinematography: Ray Rennahan
- Edited by: Archie Marshek
- Music by: Adolph Deutsch
- Color process: Technicolor
- Production company: Paramount Pictures
- Distributed by: Paramount Pictures
- Release date: December 9, 1948
- Running time: 89 minutes
- Country: United States
- Language: English
- Budget: $2 million
- Box office: $2.8 million (US)

Whispering Smith is a 1948 American Western film directed by Leslie Fenton and starring Alan Ladd as a railroad detective assigned to stop a gang of train robbers. The supporting cast includes Robert Preston, Brenda Marshall and Donald Crisp.

The picture is based on a novel by Frank H. Spearman and a previous 1926 film adaptation starring H.B. Warner.

== Plot ==
The bad Barton boys—Blake, Leroy and Gabby—rob a train and shoot a guard. Luke Smith, known as "Whispering" to some for his quiet ways, is a detective for the railroad sent to investigate.

Murray Sinclair, an old friend of Smith's, is in charge of the railroad's wrecking crew. He's glad to see Smith, who shoots Leroy and Gabby and is saved when a bullet is deflected by a harmonica in his pocket, given him long ago by his sweetheart Marian, who is now Sinclair's wife.

It saddens Smith to find out that Sinclair might be in cahoots with Barney Rebstock, a rancher with a bad reputation. Rebstock has been hiding the remaining Barton brother, Blake, who is tracked down by Smith.

Whitey DuSang is a hired gun for Rebstock, who wants to see Smith dead. When the railroad's boss gives Sinclair an order, Sinclair rebels and is fired. Rebstock hires him to pull off a string of daring train holdups.

Smith forms a posse. Whitey kills a guard and betrays Rebstock, shooting him. Sinclair is wounded. Smith does away with Whitey but gives his old friend Sinclair a last chance. When Sinclair rides home, he finds Marian packing and strikes her, accusing her of leaving him for Smith.

Smith shows up and Sinclair apologises for his actions. He seems sincere, but when Smith's back is turned, Sinclair pulls a hidden gun. Before he can fire, Sinclair falls over and dies from his wound. Smith leaves town, his work there done.

== Cast ==
- Alan Ladd as Whispering Smith
- Robert Preston as Murray Sinclair
- Brenda Marshall as Marian Sinclair
- Donald Crisp as Barney Rebstock
- William Demarest as Bill Dansing
- Fay Holden as Emmy Dansing
- Murvyn Vye as Blake Barton
- Frank Faylen as Whitey Du Sang
- John Eldredge as George McCloud
- Ward Wood as Leroy Barton (as Robert Wood)
- J. Farrell MacDonald as Bill Baggs
- Will Wright as Sheriff McSwiggin
- Don Barclay as Dr. Sawbuck
- Eddy Waller as Conductor (as Eddy Waller)
- Ashley Cowan as Brakeman
- Jimmie Dundee as Karg
- Ray Teal as Seagrue
- Bob Kortman as Gabby Barton

== Production ==
The film was announced in early 1947 as a vehicle for Alan Ladd. It was Ladd's first Western and his first movie in color.

The script made a number of changes to the original novel including changing the double love story to one.

Brenda Marshall was given her first screen role in four years. Filming began on 14 April 1947.

The role of Whispering Smith was partly based on Joe Lefors, and partly on Tim Keliher, both of them frontier lawmen who spent part of their careers as railroad detectives. The part of Murray Sinclair, Smith's friend who turns to crime, was supposedly inspired by Butch Cassidy.

The filmmakers built a Western town on five acres (2.02 ha) of the backlot at a cost of $70,000, equal to $1,009,314 today. It included 2,000 feet (609.6 m) of railroad track, on which authentic 1870 locomotives owned by Paramount were operated. The trains were converted from their original wood-burning fuel system to oil by their original owner, the Virginia & Truckee Railroad of Carson City, Nevada. The set was later re-used in many later TV shows and films, including Bonanza.

== Reception ==
The film was not released until 1949, by which time Paramount had made and released another Ladd film, Beyond Glory.

The film was popular with audiences. According to Variety it was the 20th-most popular film in the US and Canada in 1949. It was also one of the most watched films of the year in the UK.

== Possible follow-up ==
Sol Lesser, who had rights to ten Whispering Smith stories, wanted to film some of them with Robert Mitchum, who had begun his career as a leading man in a pair of Zane Grey Westerns. These films were not made. However, Audie Murphy later starred in a Whispering Smith TV series.
