= Men in Black (1934 film) =

1934 film by Ray McCarey

- The Stooges were not professionally known as "The Three Stooges" when the film was released as they were billed by their individual names
- Directed by: Raymond McCarey
- Written by: Felix Adler
- Produced by: Jules White
- Starring: Moe Howard; Larry Fine; Curly Howard; Dell Henderson; Billy Gilbert; Bud Jamison; Jeanie Roberts; "Little Billy" Rhodes; Ruth Hiatt
- Cinematography: Benjamin Kline
- Edited by: James Sweeney
- Distributed by: Columbia Pictures
- Release date: September 28, 1934 (U.S.)
- Running time: 18:02
- Country: United States
- Language: English

Men in Black is a 1934 short subject directed by Raymond McCarey starring American slapstick comedy team The Three Stooges (Moe Howard, Larry Fine, and Jerry Howard). It is the third entry in the series released by Columbia Pictures starring the comedians, who released 190 short subjects for the studio between 1934 and 1959.

Men in Black is the only Stooge film ever nominated for an Academy Award for Best Short Subject - Comedy.

== Plot ==
The Stooges portray medical school graduates whose only credentials are that they had the highest temperatures in their class. They are hired as doctors at the Los Arms Hospital solely because they have been in their senior class for too many years. Despite their superintendent's acknowledgment of their limited intellect, they are tasked with upholding the principles of "duty and humanity". The film follows a series of interactions as the Stooges attend to patients, each scenario highlighting their ineptitude and penchant for mishaps.

Accompanying their duties are recurring incidents, including Curly inadvertently breaking the superintendent's glass door. When responding to the loudspeaker, the Stooges encounter various predicaments:

1. They rush to duty on a three-person bike and create chaos upon arrival.
2. They attend to patients in different rooms as per the loudspeaker's orders, then report back to the superintendent with their outcomes.
3. They greet a telegram delivery man with news of a romantic proposition from Nellie (a love interest of all three men) who says she'll marry the man who does the greatest thing for "duty and humanity".
4. They confront a mentally unstable patient who makes outlandish claims such as rats appearing through a hole in his shirt. The trio prepares medication but drink it themselves.
5. They operate on the superintendent to retrieve a safe's combination he has swallowed. The Stooges retrieve the combination, but they mistakenly leave their tools inside him.
6. They tire of obeying orders issuing from the loudspeaker and smash it to pieces.

The film concludes with the Stooges triumphantly asserting their commitment to "duty and humanity".

== Cast ==
=== Credited ===
- Moe Howard as Dr. Moe Howard
- Larry Fine as Dr. Larry Fine
- Curly Howard as Dr. Curley Howard

=== Uncredited ===
- Dell Henderson as Dr. Graves
- Bud Jamison as Tiny Patient's Doctor
- Billy Gilbert as D. T. patient
- Jeanie Roberts as Hiccupping nurse
- "Little Billy" Rhodes as Midget in bed
- Ruth Hiatt as Whispering nurse
- Hank Mann as a Window glass installer
- Phyllis Crane as Anna Conda
- Bob Callahan as Western Union Messenger

== Production notes ==
Filming for Men in Black took place from August 28 to September 1, 1934. It holds the distinction of being the Stooge short released the fastest after its filming concluded, with a post-production time of just 27 days.

The opening title music, "I Thought I Wanted You", composed by Archie Gottler and Edward Eliscu, is unique to this and the previous film, Punch Drunks.

Men in Black contains the first appearance of many gags used in later shorts. For instance, this is the first of several Stooge shorts in which one of the three Stooges charges into or out of an office with a door that has a large plate-glass window, slamming the door behind them and causing the plate glass to shatter. It is also the first of many shorts where the Stooges make a liquid concoction of something (in this case, medicine) by randomly pouring together various liquids with gibberish names (a similar gag is sometimes used where the Stooges pass each other various tools with nonsensical names while operating). The Stooges have several off-the-wall dialogues with nurses, particularly the "hiccuping nurse" played by Jeanie Roberts, who affects a girlish Betty Boop-like voice. This is also the first short that shows the Stooges repeatedly engage in a huddle while planning something out.

This film contains the famous recurring dispatcher line: "Calling Doctor Howard, Doctor Fine, Doctor Howard." In this short, the three doctors get so exasperated with the repeated calls that they decide to tear down the dispatcher's call board. Amid the wreckage, a small transmitter appears on the floor, quivering and still repeating "Doctor Howard! Doctor Fine! Doctor Howard!", until they take out handguns and shoot it, causing the dispatcher to say: "Oh! They got me!" The Stooges then lift a toast and repeat the film's catch-phrase: "For duty and humanity!" Part of the dispatcher's call board was also used in the background of the dogwashing facility in the Stooges' short Mutts to You (1938).

The film title Men in Black is a spoof of the Clark Gable and Myrna Loy film Men in White (1934), released earlier that year. The Stooges, in fact, wear mostly white outfits for this film. The title has nothing to do with the contemporary meaning of the "men in black" phrase.

The short is significant in that it was the only time that the trio would be nominated for an Academy Award for Best Short Subject - Comedy.

Men in Black also represents an early use of what has come to be described as hammerspace. The Stooges go to the storage closet to acquire modes of transportation to get them to their patients. They are seen riding a three-man bicycle, a horse, and then individual go-carts out of the closet. A colorized version of this film was released in 2004. It was part of the DVD collection Goofs on the Loose.

== Cultural references ==
The Hospital Race car mini-game is featured in the 1980s computer game The Three Stooges. The Stooges must race to the emergency room before time runs out and avoid the patients.

== See also ==
- The Three Stooges (video game)
