= Her Lucky Night =

1945 film by Edward Lilley

- Directed by: Edward Lilley
- Written by: Clyde Bruckman
- Starring: The Andrews Sisters; Martha O'Driscoll; Noah Beery Jr
- Production company: Universal Pictures
- Distributed by: Universal Pictures
- Release date: February 9, 1945
- Running time: 63 minutes
- Country: United States
- Language: English

Her Lucky Night is a 1945 musical film starring The Andrews Sisters. It was their last film for Universal.

== Plot ==
A story of a woman who tries to find a boyfriend.

== Cast ==
- The Andrews Sisters
  - Patty Andrews
  - Maxene Andrews
  - LaVerne Andrews
- Martha O'Driscoll as Connie
- Noah Beery Jr. as Larry
- George Barbier as J.L. Wentworth
- Maurice Cass as Papa
- Marie Harmon as Susie
- Olin Howland as Prince de la Mour
- Robert Emmett Keane as Lawson
- Grady Sutton as Joe
- Edgar Dearing as Casey
- Eddie Acuff as Chauffeur
- Rita Gould as Fannie
- Charles Jordan as Bus Driver

== Lawsuit ==
The film was part of a lawsuit by Harold Lloyd against Universal Pictures. He claims they copied sequences from his films, The Freshman, Movie Crazy and Welcome Danger in their films Her Lucky Night, So's Your Uncle and Lucky Man. Her Lucky Night was supposed to have copied The Freshman; Lloyd claimed $500,000 in general damages and $500,000 in special damages for that film in particular. Lloyd won $60,000 for the Movie Crazy-So's Your Uncle infringement; he settled with Universal for more than $100,000 for the other two films.
