= Thelma White =

American actress (1910–2005)

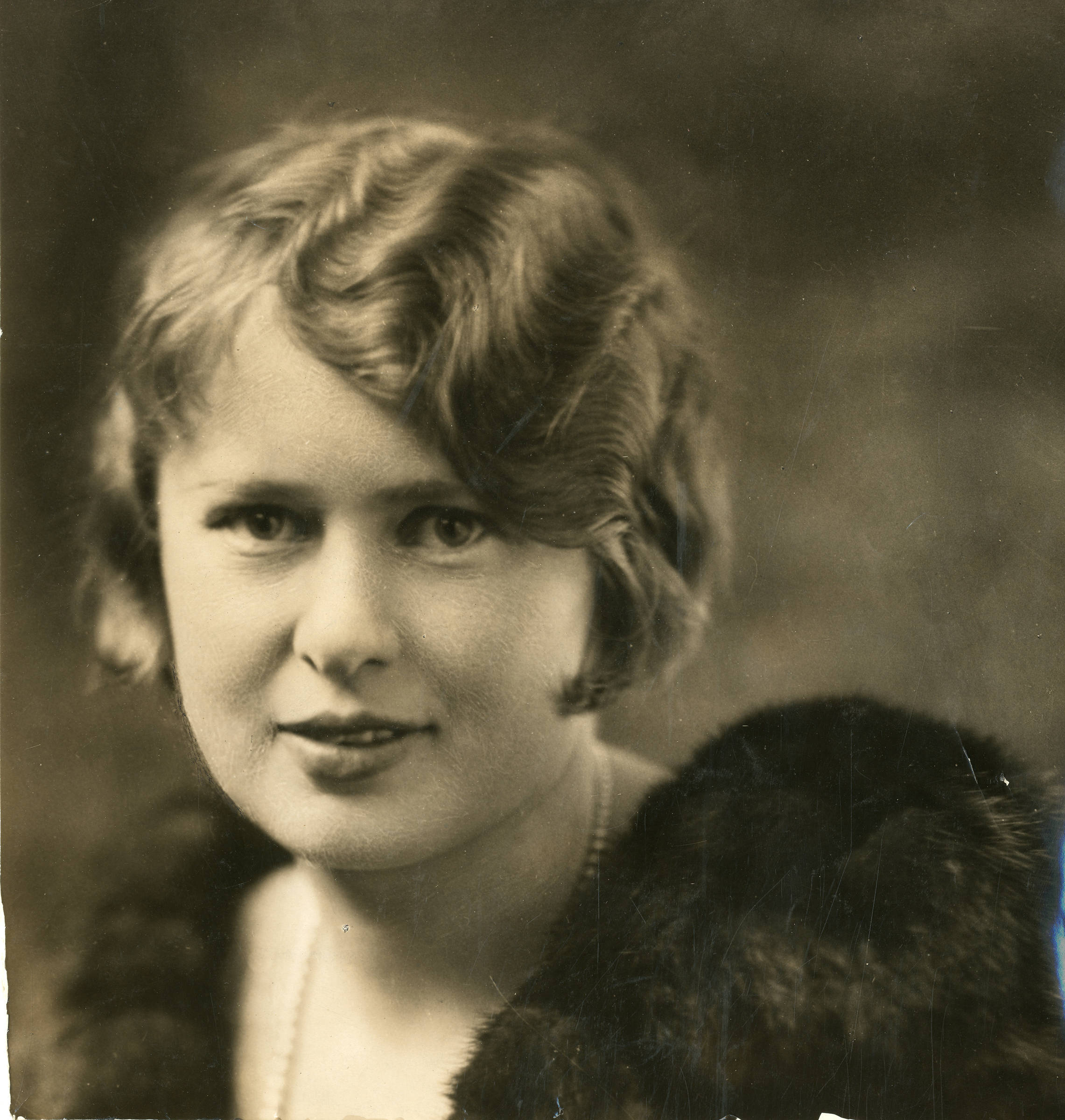
- White in 1925
- Born: Thelma Wolpa; December 4, 1910; Lincoln, Nebraska, U.S.
- Died: January 11, 2005 (aged 94); Woodland Hills, California, U.S.
- Occupation: Actress
- Years active: 1930–1948

Thelma White (born Thelma Wolpa; December 4, 1910 – January 11, 2005) was an American radio and film actress. White is best known for her role in the 1936 exploitation film Reefer Madness.

== Early life and career ==
White was born Thelma Wolpa in Lincoln, Nebraska, in 1910. Her parents were Mr. and Mrs. Harry Wolpa. She debuted in her family's circus show at age 2, acting as a "living doll" who stood in place until she got a cue to begin cooing and wriggling. In the summer of 1916 she began performing with 9-year-old Tommy Bonney. By January 1917 they had performed in communities in Nebraska and adjacent states, and they had attracted interest from representatives of the Orpheum vaudeville circuit.

In 1921 she was dancing in vaudeville with 17-year-old Canadian Marjorie Guthrie. Both had been juvenile performers in a traveling troupe, "The Winnipeg Kiddies." Christian Cassidy of the Winnipeg Free Press writes, "They passed themselves off as a child act doing various musical and comedy skits. One New York reviewer wrote, 'With their frilly little frocks and socks and slippers, they look as though they ought to be still sitting in their desks in school.' This was despite the fact Marjorie was almost 18 and Thelma at least 12, and possibly closer to 16 as studios tended to knock three or four years off of a performer’s age when they signed a contract." This throws Thelma White's presumed birthdate of 1910 open to question, because had this been true she would have teamed with Guthrie at age 11, which is unlikely. Whatever the case, Misses Wolpa and Guthrie took the stage name "The White Sisters" and, after the team split up, each retained the "White" name professionally. Guthrie became screen comedienne Marjorie White.

Thelma White's vaudeville performances led to jobs with the Ziegfeld Follies and Earl Carroll revue, then moved to Hollywood in the late 1920s. Her first film was A Night in a Dormitory (1930) co-starring Ginger Rogers. This job led to a number of short comedies for Pathé (later RKO Radio Pictures).

In 1931 the Vitaphone studio teamed Thelma White with comedian Billy Wayne for a series of seven one-reel comedies. Vitaphone was pleased enough with White to promote her to the studio's more expensive two-reel comedies. She was partnered with the hefty singer and dancer Fanny Watson, herself part of the vaudeville team Kitty and Fanny Watson, in attempt to make White and Watson a female Laurel and Hardy. White and Watson appeared in six two-reel slapstick comedies in 1931 and 1932.

== Tell Your Children ==
Thelma White's screen career was at a low ebb when she accepted an assignment from independent producer George Hirliman to appear in Tell Your Children (1936), better known today as Reefer Madness, a low-budget exploitation film to warn audiences of the dangers of marijuana. White appeared as Mae, the oft-ignored voice of conscience to her dope-dealer boyfriend Jack (Carleton Young). Jack encourages high school students to sample marijuana, after which they become involved in rape, prostitution, suicide, and various other traumas. The film went out of circulation for more than 30 years, and did not affect Thelma White's career at the time.

Tell Your Children was found in a vault in 1972 and rechristened Reefer Madness by pro-marijuana activists and a young movie distributor who sold it as a comedy. The film gained a following on college campuses for its campy nature as well as its crazed depiction of marijuana use. It soon became Thelma White's most famous—and notorious—credit. White, who had starred with W. C. Fields and Jack Benny in her best years, was somewhat chagrined to be known for such a film. In 1987, she told the Los Angeles Times: "I'm ashamed to say that it's the only one of my films that's become a classic." She did not want to make the film but was obligated by her contract to do so.

== Entertaining troops ==
During World War II, White joined the USO, a government program that featured entertainment for troops serving overseas, and performed as the leader of a swing band, "Thelma White and Her All Girl Orchestra". She and her band went to Alaska on several occasions with Rose Hobart and Carmen Miranda.

White helped entertain the troops in July 1944 at Camp Roberts, California, performing with Red Skelton in Girl Crazy.

She continued to make appearances in low-budget films (notably Bowery Champs with The East Side Kids, her last major role). Near the end of the war, she contracted a crippling disease while in the Aleutian Islands.

== Return to Hollywood ==
Although White was told she would never walk again, she partially recovered and returned to films in 1946. That year she appeared with her orchestra in four Soundies jukebox musicals. In 1947 she had a brief stay at Columbia Pictures, where she appeared in a Sterling Holloway comedy short and a Gene Krupa musical feature, and then retired from the screen.

White later worked as an agent, representing actors such as Robert Blake and James Coburn. In 1971 she came out of retirement to work in writer-director Albert Zugsmith's exploitation film Tom Jones Rides Again.

== Personal life and death ==
In Hollywood circles, Thelma White was known more for her private life than her on-camera abilities. She was married three times, first to radio star Claude Stroud (one of the Stroud twins) for five years, then a brief marriage to Max Hoffman, Jr. Her final marriage, to actor and costume designer Tony Millard, lasted for several decades.

Millard died in 1999. She had three children and died of pneumonia in the Motion Picture and Television Hospital on January 11, 2005. She was the last surviving cast member of Reefer Madness.

== Filmography ==
Year	Title	Role	Notes
1930	A Night in a Dormitory	Thelma	
1930	Ride 'em Cowboy		Alternative title: Pathé Folly Comedies: Ride 'em Cowboy
1930	Sixteen Sweeties		Alternative title: Pathé Melody Comedies: Sixteen Sweeties
1931	One Way Out	Desperate for Permanent Wave	
1931	Hot Sands	Wife	
1933	Hey, Nanny Nanny	Mrs. Bond	
1934	Hips, Hips, Hooray!	Blonde	Uncredited
1934	What Price Jazz		
1934	Susie's Affairs	Susie's Blonde Roommate	
1935	Never Too Late	Helen Lloyd	Alternative title: It's Never Too Late to Mend
1936	Reefer Madness	Mae	Alternative title: Tell Your Children
1936	Two in the Dark	Woman	Uncredited
1936	The Moon's Our Home	Salesgirl	
1936	Forgotten Faces	Nurse in park	
1938	Wanted by the Police	Lillian	
1942	Syncopation	Singer on Piano at Party	Uncredited
1942	A Man's World	Dancehall girl	Uncredited
1942	Pretty Dolly	Baby, Cigar Counter Clerk	
1943	Spy Train	Millie	
1944	Bowery Champs	Diane Gibson	
1947	Hectic Honeymoon		
1948	Mary Lou	Eve Summers	
