= Send Me Away with a Smile =

"Send Me Away With A Smile"
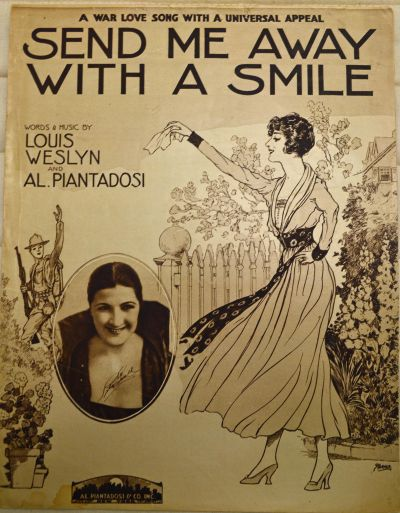
- Sheet Music cover

Song by Starmer
- Language: English
- Published: 1917
- Composer(s): Al Piantadosi
- Lyricist(s): Louis Weslyn

Send Me Away With A Smile is a World War I song written by Louis Weslyn and composed by Al Piantadosi. The song was first published in 1917 by Al. Piantadosi & Co., Inc. in New York, NY. The sheet music cover depicts a woman waving to a soldier from a fenced yard with an inset photo of Rita Gould.

The famous Irish tenor, John McCormack, had a very popular recording of this song in 1918. M.J. O'Connell also received popularity with his recording of the song in 1918.

The sheet music can be found at the Pritzker Military Museum & Library.
