= The Vicious Circle (1948 film) =

1948 film by W. Lee Wilder

- Directed by: W. Lee Wilder
- Written by: Heinz Herald (play) and Geza Herczeg (play and screenplay) and Guy Endore (screenplay); Noel Langley (adaption)
- Produced by: W. Lee Wilder
- Cinematography: George Robinson
- Edited by: John F. Link Sr. Asa Boyd Clark
- Music by: Paul Dessau
- Production company: W. Lee Wilder Productions
- Distributed by: United Artists
- Release date: July 21, 1948 (United States)
- Running time: 77 minutes
- Country: United States
- Language: English

The Vicious Circle is a 1948 American drama film directed by W. Lee Wilder and based on the play The Burning Bush by Heinz Herald and Geza Herczeg. The film is also known as The Woman in Brown.

== Plot summary ==
A rich Hungarian baron discovers that there are large oil deposits underneath properties owned by the villagers. He buys up all the property except those owned by Jewish families, who refuse to sell. In order to circumvent their refusal, he has the men charged with the murder of a woman, who had recently committed suicide.

== Cast ==
- Conrad Nagel as Karl Nemesh - Defense Attorney
- Fritz Kortner as Joseph Schwartz - Defendant tenant
- Reinhold Schünzel as Baron Arady
- Philip Van Zandt as Calomar Balog - Special Investigator
- Lyle Talbot as Prosecutor Miller
- Edwin Maxwell as Presiding Judge
- Frank Ferguson as Stark - State attorney
- Lester Dorr as Andreas Molnar - Neighbor
- Michael Mark as Gustav Horney - Land owner
- Belle Mitchell as Mrs. Julianna Horney - Anna's Master
- Nan Boardman as Mrs. Maria Tamashy - Anna's mother
- Shirley Kneeland as Clara Tamashy - Anna's sister
- Rita Gould as Ethel Mihaly
- Eddie LeRoy as Samuel Schwartz (George)
- David Alexander as Fisher
- Ben Welden as Constable
- Nina Hansen as Mrs. Schwartz
- Mary Lou Harrington as Anna Tamashy
- Peggy Wynne as Irene Peter
- Robert Cherry as Marten
- Sam Bernard as Herman
- Rudolph Cameron as Dr. Daroush
- Peter Brocco as Dr. Georges Samosch
- Christina Vale as Margaret Daroush - Witness
- Don C. Harvey
- Fred Fox
- Manfred Fuerst
- Ruben Wendorf
- David Bauer (billed as Herman Waldman)
- Paul Baratoff
