= Swing High (1930 film) =

1930 film

- Lobby card
- Directed by: Joseph Santley
- Written by: James Seymour; Ray McCarey; Joseph Santley
- Produced by: E.B. Derr
- Starring: Helen Twelvetrees; Fred Scott; Dorothy Burgess
- Cinematography: David Abel
- Edited by: Daniel Mandell
- Music by: Josiah Zuro
- Production company: Pathé Exchange
- Distributed by: Pathé Exchange
- Release date: May 18, 1930
- Running time: 95 minutes
- Country: United States
- Language: English

Swing High is a 1930 American pre-Code musical film directed by Joseph Santley and starring Helen Twelvetrees, Fred Scott, and Dorothy Burgess.

The film's sets were designed by the art director Carroll Clark.

== Cast ==
- Helen Twelvetrees as Maryan Garner
- Fred Scott as Garry
- Dorothy Burgess as Trixie
- John Sheehan as Doc May
- Daphne Pollard as Mrs. May
- George Fawcett as Pop Garner
- Bryant Washburn as Ringmaster Joe
- Nick Stuart as Billy
- Sally Starr as Ruth
- "Little Billy" Rhodes as Major Tiny
- William Hall as Babe
- Stepin Fetchit as Sam
- Chester Conklin as Sheriff
- Ben Turpin as Bartender
- Robert Edeson as Doctor
- Mickey Bennett as Mickey
- Dannie Mac Grant as Young Boy
- Clarence Muse as Singer
- Rolfe Sedan as Trouper

== Bibliography ==
- Bradley, Edwin M. The First Hollywood Musicals: A Critical Filmography Of 171 Features, 1927 Through 1932. McFarland, 2004.
