= Espionage Agent =

1939 film

- Directed by: Lloyd Bacon
- Screenplay by: Robert Buckner; Warren Duff; Frank Donaghue; Michael Fessier
- Starring: Joel McCrea; Brenda Marshall; Jeffrey Lynn; George Bancroft
- Cinematography: Charles Rosher
- Edited by: Ralph Dawson
- Music by: Adolph Deutsch
- Distributed by: Warner Bros. Pictures
- Release date: September 22, 1939 (U.S.)
- Running time: 83 minutes
- Country: United States
- Language: English

Espionage Agent is a pre–World War II spy melodrama produced by Hal B. Wallis in 1939. Directed by Lloyd Bacon, Espionage Agent, like many Warner Bros. movies, clearly identifies the Germans as the enemy. This was unlike the policy of many other movie studios during this period that did not want to antagonize foreign governments.

The film was released on September 22, 1939, the day after President Franklin D. Roosevelt signed the Neutrality Act allowing "Cash and Carry" provisions for countries fighting Germany and a little over four months after the premiere of another Warner Bros. anti-Nazi film, Confessions of a Nazi Spy.

== Plot ==
The film opens with a description of the Black Tom explosion of a munitions supply located in Jersey City on the Hudson River. The explosion, which occurred during World War I was an act of sabotage by German agents.

Barry Corvall (Joel McCrea), the son of a recently deceased American diplomat, has just got married. When he discovers that his new wife (Brenda Marshall) is a possible enemy agent, he resigns from the diplomatic service to go undercover to expose an espionage ring planning to destroy American industrial capability before war breaks out.

Traveling on a train in Germany, Corvall attempts to steal a briefcase with documents in an attempt to prove that the Nazis have been infiltrating vital industrial centers in the United States. With the help of his wife, he tries to foil the plans of the Nazi spy (Martin Kosleck).

== Cast ==
- Joel McCrea as Barry Corvall
- Brenda Marshall as Brenda Ballard
- Jeffrey Lynn as Lowell Warrington
- George Bancroft as Dudley Garrett
- Stanley Ridges as Hamilton Peyton
- James Stephenson as Dr. Anton Rader
- Howard C. Hickman as Walter Forbes
- Martin Kosleck as Karl Mullen
- Nana Bryant as Mrs. Corvall
- Rudolph Anders as Paul Strawn
- Hans Heinrich von Twardowski as Dr. Helm
- Lucien Prival as Decker
- Addison Richards as Bruce Corvall
- Edwin Stanley as Secretary of State
- Granville Bates as Phineas T. O'Grady

== Bans ==
The film was banned in Norway in January 1940. Norwegian authorities did not provide a reason for the ban but issued the following statement: The film above is not approved for public viewing in Norway.
