= Stephen Roberts (actor) =

American film, stage and television actor

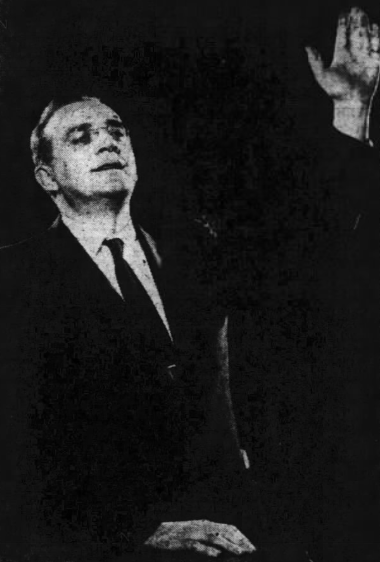
- Roberts as Franklin D. Roosevelt in Sunrise at Campobello, 1960
- Born: Stephen Thomas Guzley; July 25, 1917; Floral Park, New York, U.S.
- Died: October 26, 1999 (aged 82); Woodland Hills, California, U.S.
- Education: Van Norman University
- Occupations: Film, stage and television actor

Stephen Thomas Guzley (July 25, 1917 – October 26, 1999) was an American film, stage and television actor. He was known for playing the recurring role of Mr. Stan Peeples in the American drama television series Mr. Novak.

== Life and career ==
Roberts was born in Floral Park, New York, the son of Peter and Catharine Guzley. He attended Van Norman University, studying law. He began his stage career in 1938, appearing in the stage play Danton’s Death. He appeared in other stage plays such as Sunrise at Campobello (as Franklin D. Roosevelt), Summer Night, Joan of Lorraine, The Day Will Come, Native Son, Catherine Was Great and On Whitman Avenue. He then began his screen career in 1943, appearing in the film Spy Train. In the same year, he appeared in the film The Song of Bernadette.

Later in his career, Roberts made his television debut in the NBC anthology television series Fireside Theatre. He guest-starred in numerous television programs including Gunsmoke, Bonanza, Tales of Wells Fargo, 77 Sunset Strip, Have Gun – Will Travel, The Fugitive, Death Valley Days, Green Acres and The Deputy, and played the recurring role of Mr. Stan Peeples in the NBC drama television series Mr. Novak. He also appeared in films such as The Ten Commandments, Samson and Delilah, Julius Caesar, Diary of a Madman, The Court-Martial of Billy Mitchell, Kiss of Death, Miracle on 34th Street and Escape from the Planet of the Apes.

Roberts retired from acting in 1986, last appearing in the film The Whoopee Boys.

== Death ==
Roberts died on October 26, 1999, of cancer at the Motion Picture & Television Hospital in Woodland Hills, California, at the age of 82.
