= Are These Our Parents =

1944 American film by William Nigh

Are These Our Parents?
- Directed by: William Nigh
- Cinematography: Harry Neumann
- Edited by: John F. Link Sr.
- Distributed by: Monogram Pictures
- Release date: 27 June 1944
- Running time: 73 minutes
- Country: United States
- Language: English

Are These Our Parents? is a 1944 American romantic drama film directed by William Nigh. It stars Helen Vinson, Lyle Talbot, Ivan Lebedeff.

== Plot ==
A mother's preference for partying, boozing, and running around with an assortment of sleazy characters results in her neglecting her nubile teenage daughter, who subsequently finds herself mixed up with teenage boys, nightclub owners, and murder.

== Cast ==
- Helen Vinson as Myra Salisbury
- Lyle Talbot as George Kent
- Ivan Lebedeff as Alexis Dolan
- Noel Neill as Terry Salisbury
- Richard Byron as Hal Bailey
- Emma Dunn as Ma Henderson
- Addison Richards as Clint Davis
- Anthony Warde as Sam Bailey
- Robin Raymond as Mona Larson
- Ian Wolfe as Pa Henderson
- Claire McDowell as Miss Winfield

== See also ==
- List of American films of 1944
