= The Glass Alibi =

1946 film by W. Lee Wilder

- Theatrical release poster
- Directed by: W. Lee Wilder
- Screenplay by: Mindret Lord
- Produced by: W. Lee Wilder
- Starring: Paul Kelly; Douglas Fowley; Anne Gwynne; Maris Wrixon
- Cinematography: Henry Sharp
- Edited by: John F. Link Sr.
- Music by: Alexander Laszlo
- Color process: Black and white
- Production company: W. Lee Wilder Productions
- Distributed by: Republic Pictures
- Release date: April 27, 1946
- Running time: 68 minutes
- Country: United States
- Language: English

The Glass Alibi is a 1946 American film noir crime film directed by W. Lee Wilder starring Paul Kelly, Douglas Fowley, Anne Gwynne and Maris Wrixon.

== Plot ==
A reporter marries a dying girl for her money, but she recovers from her illness so he plots her murder.

== Cast ==
- Paul Kelly as Max Anderson
- Douglas Fowley as Joe Eykner
- Anne Gwynne as Belle Martin
- Maris Wrixon as Linda Vale
- Jack Conrad as Benny Brandini
- Selmer Jackson as Dr. John F. Lawson
- Cyril Thornton as Riggs
- Cy Kendall as Red Hogan
- Walter Soderling as Coroner
- Victor Potel as Gas Attendant
- George Chandler as Bartender
- Phyllis Adair as Nurse
- Ted Stanhope as Drug Clerk
- Dick Scott as Frank
- Eula Guy as Connie
- Forrest Taylor as Charlie
