= The Pretender (film) =

1947 film by W. Lee Wilder

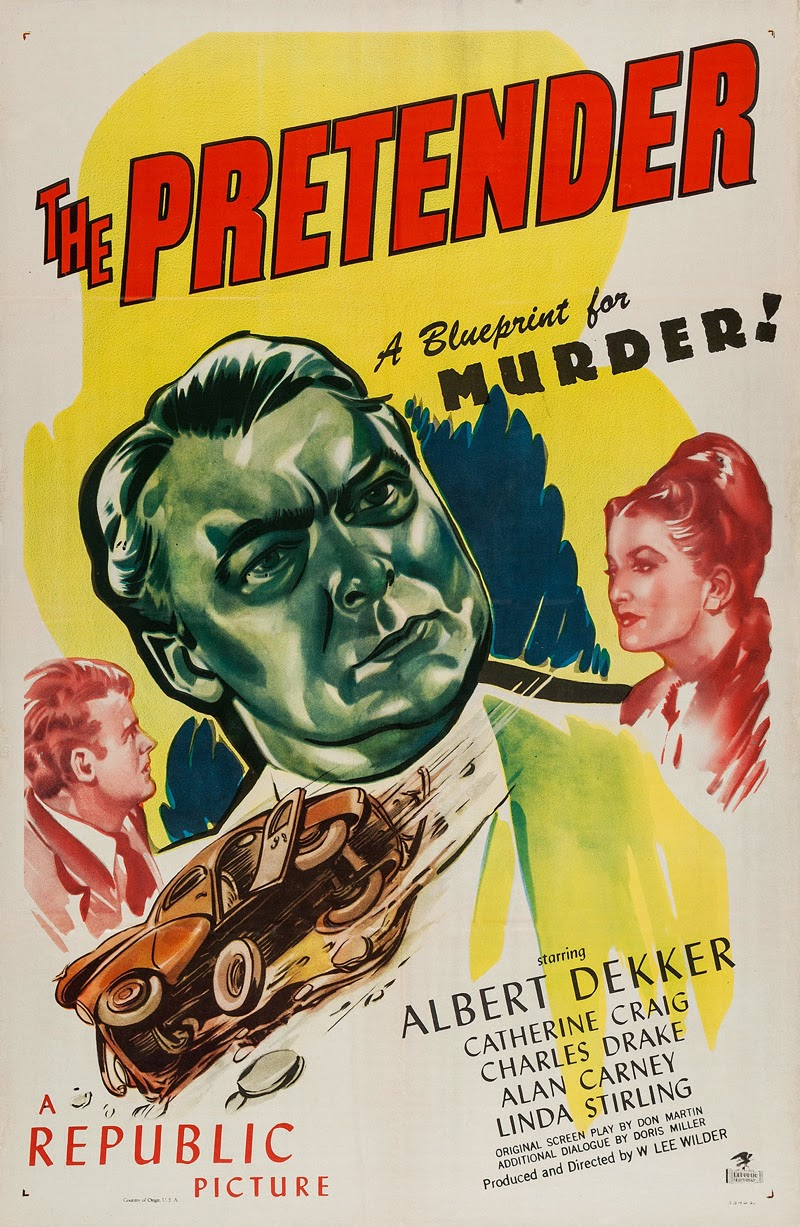
- Theatrical release poster
- Directed by: W. Lee Wilder
- Written by: Don Martin; Doris Miller
- Produced by: W. Lee Wilder
- Starring: Albert Dekker; Catherine Craig; Charles Drake; Alan Carney
- Cinematography: John Alton
- Edited by: John F. Link Sr. Asa Boyd Clark
- Music by: Paul Dessau
- Production company: W. Lee Wilder Productions
- Distributed by: Republic Pictures
- Release date: August 13, 1947 (United States)
- Running time: 69 minutes
- Country: United States
- Language: English

The Pretender is a 1947 crime drama film noir directed by W. Lee Wilder starring Albert Dekker, Catherine Craig, Charles Drake, and Alan Carney.

== Plot ==
The story tells of Kenneth Holden (Dekker), a crooked investment businessman, who embezzles a large sum of money from an estate. He hopes to cover his crime by marrying the estate's heiress, Claire Worthington (Craig).

However, Worthington is already engaged, so Holden arranges for her fiancé to be killed. The hired hit man's only means of identifying the victim is the picture in the society columns. When Claire Worthington changes her mind and agrees to marry Holden, however, it means that it is his picture that will appear in the newspaper, thereby condemning him to death. Desperately trying to contact the hit man, Holden discovers that the man is dead, but his successor is still at large.

== Cast ==
- Albert Dekker as Kenneth Holden
- Catherine Craig as Claire Worthington
- Charles Drake as Dr. Leonard Koster
- Alan Carney as Victor Korrin
- Linda Stirling as Flo Ronson
- Tom Kennedy as Fingers
- Selmer Jackson as Charles Lennox
- Charles Middleton as William the Butler
- Ernie Adams as Thomas the butler
- Ben Welden as Mickie
- John Bagni as Hank Gordon
- Stanley Ross as Stranger
- Forrest Taylor as Dr. Harold Stevens
- Greta Clement as Margie
- Peter Michael as Stephen
- Peggy Wynne as Miss Chalmers
- Eula Guy as First Nurse
- Cay Forrester as Evelyn Cossett
- Michael Mark as Mike - Janitor
- Dorothy Scott as Miss Michael

== Critical reception ==
Critic Dennis Schwartz liked the film and wrote, "Billy Wilder's lesser-known elder brother William Lee Wilder...directs this striking film noir about a successful man becoming paranoid and placing himself in entrapment. In one amazing characteristic noir scene, the protagonist is seated on the floor of his unlit, locked room eating crackers and canned food, afraid of being poisoned. This is one of the first movies to score for theremin, an effectively chilling mood music which later became a cliché for many 1950s sci-fi films about aliens. John Alton's dark film noir photography sets the proper mood for the melodrama. The film noir is absorbing despite stilted dialogue and flat direction."

== See also ==
- List of American films of 1947
