= You Can't Escape Forever =

1942 film by Jo Graham

- Theatrical release poster
- Directed by: Jo Graham
- Screenplay by: Fred Niblo, Jr. Hector Chevigny
- Story by: Roy Chanslor
- Starring: George Brent; Brenda Marshall; Gene Lockhart; Roscoe Karns; Eduardo Ciannelli; Paul Harvey
- Cinematography: Tony Gaudio; James Van Trees
- Edited by: David Weisbart
- Music by: Adolph Deutsch
- Production company: Warner Bros. Pictures
- Distributed by: Warner Bros. Pictures
- Release date: October 10, 1942
- Running time: 77 minutes
- Country: United States
- Language: English

You Can't Escape Forever is a 1942 American drama film directed by Jo Graham and written by Fred Niblo, Jr. and Hector Chevigny. The film stars George Brent, Brenda Marshall, Gene Lockhart, Roscoe Karns, Eduardo Ciannelli and Paul Harvey. The film was released by Warner Bros. Pictures on October 10, 1942.

== Plot ==
When reporter Laurie Abbott faints during an execution and phones in an invented story, she is assigned to write the newspaper's "advice to the lovelorn" column as punishment. When she objects, editor Steve Mitchell suggests that she quit and marry him instead. Laurie's stint as a columnist does not last long, however, as she is soon replaced by Mitch when he fails in his attempt to link racketeer Boss Greer with the suspicious death of Matthew Crowder. Goaded by Laurie, Mitch turns the column into the most popular part of the paper. One day, avid reader Kirsty Lundstrom demands to speak in person to the column's writer. Laurie, pretending to be the writer, learns that Kirsty met a man at the Lonesome Club, who later got into trouble with some "big shots" and died. Mitch remembers that Crowder also met his wife at the Lonesome Club, and he and Laurie, together with photographer "Mac" McTurk, decide to investigate. The three arrive at the club in time to see a wedding. Afterward, Mitch obtains a book containing the names of all the people married at the club from the judge who performed the ceremony, and Laurie observes some of Greer's men loading a truck with tires. When Carl Robelink, the owner of the club and Greer's brother-in-law, becomes suspicious, Mitch and Mac start a fight, and the three escape in the confusion. Later, Laurie learns that Robelink has a manuscript written by Crowder, which apparently implicates Greer in graft. At Greer's club, Mitch overhears Robelink and Greer quarrel, and after Greer leaves the room, Mitch offers Robelink protection against Greer if he will reveal where he has hidden Crowder's manuscript. After they learn that the manuscript is in Crowder's coffin, Mitch, Mac and Laurie hurry to the cemetery, followed by Greer and his men. At the cemetery, Mitch finds the manuscript minutes before Greer arrives and escapes with Laurie and Mac. The manuscript provides evidence of Greer's profiteering activities and, as Mitch breaks the story, Greer is arrested by soldiers. A new writer is assigned to the lovelorn column, and Laurie agrees to marry Mitch if she does not have to give up her career. Mitch simply winks in response.

== Cast ==
- George Brent as Steve Mitchell
- Brenda Marshall as Laurie Abbott
- Gene Lockhart as Carl Robelink
- Roscoe Karns as 'Mac' McTurk
- Eduardo Ciannelli as Boss Greer
- Paul Harvey as Maj. Turner
- Edith Barrett as Madame Lucille
- Mary Field as Kirsty Lundstrom
