= Two Plus Fours =

1930 film

- Directed by: Ray McCarey
- Written by: Chuck Callahan (story); Ray McCarey (story)
- Produced by: John C. Flinn (producer); Fred Guiol (supervising producer)
- Starring: Bing Crosby, Thelma Hill, and the Rhythm Boys
- Cinematography: Paul Perry
- Edited by: John F. Link Sr.
- Release date: 1930
- Running time: 20 minutes
- Country: United States
- Language: English

Two Plus Fours is a 1930 Campus Comedies short film directed by Ray McCarey and featuring the Rhythm Boys (Bing Crosby, Al Rinker and Harry Barris). The film was shot in 5 days starting on May 29, 1930 at a cost of $19,689. It previewed in mid-June and was shipped early in July 1930.

== Plot summary ==
The Rhythm Boys are some of the students from Tait College who patronize a tailor named Ginsberg who is affectionately known as Ripstitch. The tailor hits financial problems and is threatened with eviction by a bullying landlord. He is eventually saved by the support of all the students led by the Rhythm Boys.

== Cast ==
- Nat Carr as Ripstitch the Tailor
- Thelma Hill as Mary Ginsberg - Max's Daughter
- Harry Barris as Harry
- Bing Crosby as Bing
- Al Rinker as Al
- Edgar Dearing as Rent Collector
- Spec O'Donnell as Spec

== Soundtrack ==
- The Stein Song - sung by The Rhythm Boys on two occasions, the second of which is a parody.
