= Spy Train =

1943 film by Harold Young

- Directed by: Harold Young
- Screenplay by: Leslie Swabacker; Bart Lytton
- Story by: Scott Littlefield
- Produced by: Max King
- Starring: Richard Travis; Catherine Craig; Chick Chandler; Thelma White; Evelyn Brent; Warren Hymer
- Cinematography: Mack Stengler
- Edited by: Martin G. Cohn
- Production company: Monogram Pictures
- Distributed by: Monogram Pictures
- Release date: July 9, 1943
- Running time: 61 minutes
- Country: United States
- Language: English

Spy Train is a 1943 American crime film directed by Harold Young and written by Leslie Swabacker and Bart Lytton. The film stars Richard Travis, Catherine Craig, Chick Chandler, Thelma White, Evelyn Brent and Warren Hymer. The film was released on July 9, 1943, by Monogram Pictures.

== Plot ==
Bruce Grant is the author of Darkest Germany, an exposé about Nazi Germany. He and his friend Stew Stewart board a train in the United States to go meet Max Thornwald, owner of a chain of newspapers. Nazi agents in America have fabricated a photograph showing Thornwald's daughter, Jane, having lunch with Hermann Göring and Adolf Hitler, and have successfully blackmailed Thornwald into suppressing Bruce's articles exposing Nazi atrocities. Bruce wants to know why his items aren't being published. Jane and her maid, Millie, happen to be on the train as well.

Meanwhile, Nazi husband-wife spy team Hugo and Frieda Molte have left a suitcase bomb in the train station's baggage check. Other spies have managed to steal evidence of the Molte's espionage activities, and left it in a suitcase at the baggage check as well. The Moltes' henchman, Krantz, is to retrieve the evidence. By coincidence, Krantz's girlfriend is Millie. Krantz holds a ticket stub for Millie's suitcase and the suitcase bomb. Krantz gives Mille the wrong ticket stub, and she unwittingly retrieves the bomb (as both suitcases are identical).

After the train departs, Bruce spots the Moltes aboard the train and realizes they are spies. Krantz realizes his error and sends a telegram to the Moltes. Herman Molte tries to retrieve the suitcase from Millie's compartment, but discovers an Italian spy and stabs him to death. A porter (Fred Toones) interrupts him before he can remove the suitcase. Bruce discovers the body, and plants it in the Moltes' compartment. The Moltes find it, and plant it in Bruce's compartment. Stew is left to guard Millie's bag, and Molte stabs him and grabs the suitcase. A conductor sees Stew is wounded, and confronts Bruce just as the Italian's body falls out of the closet.

Bruce is placed under arrest, but escapes. The conductor telegraphs ahead for a doctor and the police. The train comes to an unscheduled stop, and two detectives and a physician come aboard. Frieda Molte finally receives Krantz's telegram. Before she can decode it, Bruce enters her compartment and holds the Moltes at gunpoint. He grabs the telegram, reads it, and permits the Moltes to flee the train with the suitcase. They do, and try to open it once they are off the train. They die in a horrible explosion.

Jane clears Bruce's name, Krantz is arrested trying to retrieve the evidence bag, and the spy ring's headquarters are raided. With the fake photo of Jane exposed, Thornwald eagerly publishes Bruce's anti-Nazi articles. Bruce and Jane marry.

== Cast ==
- Richard Travis as Bruce Grant
- Catherine Craig as Jane Thornwall
- Chick Chandler as Stew Stewart
- Thelma White as Millie
- Evelyn Brent as Frieda Molte
- Warren Hymer as Herman Krantz
- Paul McVey as Hugo Molte
- Herbert Heyes as Max Thornwald
- Stephen Roberts as Anderson #1
- Forrest Taylor as Anderson #2
- Dick Rush as Sam
- Bill Hunter as Detective
- Barbara Mace
- Caroline Burke
- William Kellogg as Detective
- George Bronson
- Fred Toones as Pullman Car Porter
- Napoleon Whiting as Club Car Porter
