= Devil's Cargo =

1948 film by John F. Link Sr.

- Directed by: John F. Link Sr.
- Screenplay by: Don Martin
- Story by: Jason James; Robert Tallman
- Based on: The Falcon by Michael Arlen
- Produced by: Philip N. Krasne
- Starring: John Calvert; Rochelle Hudson; Roscoe Karns; Lyle Talbot
- Cinematography: Walter Strenge
- Edited by: Asa Boyd Clark
- Music by: Paul Dessau
- Distributed by: Film Classics
- Release date: 1 April 1948
- Running time: 64 minutes
- Country: United States
- Language: English

Devil's Cargo is a 1948 American mystery film directed by John F. Link Sr. It was the fourteenth of the sixteen Falcon films produced in the 1940s, and the first of the three featuring the magician and actor John Calvert. The film was released by Film Classics, instead of RKO Pictures.

== Plot ==
Michael Watling/The Falcon, detective for hire, is in for more than he bargained for when he accepts $500 to guard a key given to him by desperate man Ramon Delgado.

== Cast ==
- John Calvert as Michael "The Falcon" Watling
- Rochelle Hudson as Margo Delgado
- Roscoe Karns as Lt. Hardy
- Lyle Talbot as Johnny Morello
- Theodore von Eltz as Thomas Mallon
- Michael Mark as Salvation Army Captain
- Tom Kennedy as Naga
- Paul Marion as Ramon Delgado
- Paul Regan as Bernie Horton
- Eula Guy as Mrs. Murphy
- Christine Larson as Nurse
- Walter Soderling as Coroner
- Peter Michael as Mr. Worthington
- Fred Coby as Fred
- Brain Trust as Himself
