= "Little Billy" Rhodes =

American actor (1895–1967)

- Born: Clarence Herbert Bliss; February 1, 1895; Lynn, Massachusetts, U.S.
- Died: July 24, 1967 (aged 72); Los Angeles, California, U.S.
- Occupation: Actor
- Years active: 1904–1963

Clarence Herbert Bliss (February 1, 1895 – July 24, 1967), professionally billed as "Little Billy" Rhodes, was an American stage and film character actor with dwarfism who was active in Hollywood from the 1920s through the 1960s. Over the course of his career, he appeared in noteworthy projects like The Wizard of Oz as the Barrister and The Terror of Tiny Town, the latter of which was a western that was billed as featuring an all-little-person cast.

== Biography ==
A native of Lynn, Massachusetts, "Little Billy" recalled that his father left the family upon realizing his son's short stature (excluding early childhood). "I grew up in awful poverty—simply awful," he said in an interview. "Mattress on the floor, that sort of thing." As a child, he sold newspapers to help make ends meet.

At the age of 9, infatuated by the theater, "Little Billy" was taken in by Jerry Grady, a showman who would become Billy's manager. Appearing in vaudeville and on Broadway beginning in the 1910s, he eventually made it to Hollywood around 1926 and began appearing on-screen.

In the early 1940s, he headed a convention known as the International Midget League.

When asked about whether his height had a negative impact on his career, the actor had this to say: "I have never found my build a handicap. In fact, I consider it something of an asset. I have reached a fair measure of success in my life—success which would have been impossible if I had been of an ordinary build."

He died in Los Angeles, California, in 1967.

== Selected filmography ==
- 1949: Skimpy in the Navy
- 1941: Kiss the Boys Goodbye
- 1940: You Nazty Spy!
- 1939: The Wizard of Oz
- 1938: The Terror of Tiny Town
- 1938: Marie Antoinette
- 1938: The Daredevil Drivers
- 1937: Artist and Models
- 1936: Bengal Tiger
- 1934: Men in Black
- 1932: The Devil Is Driving
- 1932: Make Me a Star
- 1932: They Never Come Back
- 1932: Polly of the Circus
- 1932: The Shadow of the Eagle
- 1930: Swing High
- 1928: The Sideshow
- 1926: Oh, Baby!
