= So's Your Uncle =

1943 film by Jean Yarbrough

- Directed by: Jean Yarbrough
- Written by: Clyde Bruckman
- Starring: Billie Burke and Donald Woods
- Production company: Universal Pictures
- Distributed by: Universal Pictures
- Release date: December 1, 1945
- Running time: 65 minutes
- Country: United States
- Language: English

So's Your Uncle is 1943 comedy film directed by Jean Yarbrough and starring Billie Burke and Donald Woods.

== Plot ==
A man impersonates his uncle and runs into trouble with his girlfriend's aunt.

== Cast ==
- Billie Burke as Aunt Minerva
- Donald Woods as Steve Curtis aka Uncle John
- Elyse Knox as Patricia Williams
- Frank Jenks as Joe Elliott
- Robert Lowery as Roger Bright
- Irving Bacon as Dempster
- Chester Clute as Dinwiddle
- Paul Stanton as John L, Curtis
- Jack Norton as Drunk
- Tom Kennedy as Cop
- John Dilson as Stevens

== Lawsuit ==
The film was part of a lawsuit by Harold Lloyd against Universal Pictures. He claims that the film's writer, Clyde Bruckman, copied sequences from Lloyd's films, The Freshman, Movie Crazy and Welcome Danger in their films Her Lucky Night, So's Your Uncle and Lucky Man. The court awarded Lloyd $60,000 for Movie Crazy being infringed by So's Your Uncle. He settled with Universal for more than $100,000 for the other two films. Bruckman had previously worked with Lloyd on Movie Crazy and Welcome Danger.
