= Yankee Fakir =

1947 film by W. Lee Wilder

- Theatrical release poster
- Directed by: W. Lee Wilder
- Screenplay by: Richard S. Conway
- Story by: Mindret Lord
- Produced by: W. Lee Wilder
- Starring: Douglas Fowley; Joan Woodbury; Clem Bevans; Ransom M. Sherman; Frank Reicher; Marc Lawrence
- Cinematography: Robert Pittack
- Edited by: Joseph B. Caplin
- Music by: Alexander Laszlo
- Production company: W. Lee Wilder Productions
- Distributed by: Republic Pictures
- Release date: April 1, 1947
- Running time: 71 minutes
- Country: United States
- Language: English

Yankee Fakir is a 1947 American comedy mystery film directed and produced by W. Lee Wilder and written by Richard S. Conway from a story by Mindret Lord. The film stars Douglas Fowley, Joan Woodbury, Clem Bevans, Ransom M. Sherman, Frank Reicher and Marc Lawrence. The film was released on April 1, 1947, by Republic Pictures.

== Plot ==
Two peddlers, Mergatroyd Barthlomew "Yankee" Davis and Professor Newton, discover a smuggling operation in the fictional town of Mystic, Arizona. Border patrol officer Mason investigates, while his daughter Mary Mason runs a boarding house.

== Cast ==
- Douglas Fowley as Murgatroyd Bartholomew "Yankee" Davis
- Joan Woodbury as Mary Mason
- Clem Bevans as Shaggy Hartley posing as Professor Davis
- Ransom M. Sherman as Professor Newton
- Frank Reicher as Banker H.W. Randall
- Marc Lawrence as Duke
- Walter Soderling as sheriff
- Eula Guy as Mrs. Irmatrude Tetley
- Forrest Taylor as border guard Mason
- Elinor Appleton as Jenny
- Peter Michael as border guard Walker
- Elspeth Dudgeon as scrubwoman
- Ernie Adams as Charlie
- Tom Bernard as Tommy Mason

== Reception ==
Variety wrote: "Modest budgeted comedy mystery. ... General production values are par with the mediocre scripting with nothing special to commend in either its thesping, direction or camera work. ... Fowley is adequate in the central role and gets okay comedy support from Ransom Sherman, his assistant in the pitchman routines. Clem Bevans, as a vagrant posing as a millionaire, also registers with a competent performance while Joan Woodbury, as the heart interest, is a nice looker, but not given much to do. Rest of the cast in stock parts do okay. Incidental song, 'Caught Like a Rat in a Trap,' is straight corn."

The Monthly Film Bulletin wrote: "There are a few amusing situations, but on the whole the film meanders slowly and rather pointlessly along. Direction fails to give any of the much-needed sparkle, and the acting cannot rise above the mediocre script."
