= The Back Page (film) =

1931 film

- Directed by: Fatty Arbuckle (as William Goodrich)
- Produced by: Jack White
- Starring: George Chandler
- Distributed by: Educational Pictures
- Release date: May 24, 1931
- Running time: 20 minutes
- Country: United States
- Language: English

The Back Page is a 1931 American pre-Code comedy film directed by Fatty Arbuckle. The title satirizes the famous play and 1931 film The Front Page.

== Plot ==
A young woman seeking a job as a newspaper editor comes to a small newspaper run by an old man.

== Cast ==
- Virginia Brooks
- Wheeler Oakman
- George MacFarlane
- George Chandler
