= W. Lee Wilder =

American film director (1904–1982)

- Born: Wilhelm Wilder; August 22, 1904; Sucha, Austria-Hungary
- Died: February 14, 1982 (aged 77); Los Angeles, California, United States
- Occupations: Film producer, director, screenwriter
- Children: Myles Wilder
- Relatives: Billy Wilder (brother)

Wilhelm Wilder, also known as William Wilder, Willy Wilder and W. Lee Wilder, (August 22, 1904 – February 14, 1982) was an Austrian-American screenwriter, film producer and director. He was the brother of the film director Billy Wilder and father of television comedy writer and producer Myles Wilder.

== Biography ==
The son of Jewish parents Maximillian Wilder and his wife Eugenia Wilder, Wilhelm Wilder was born on August 22, 1904, in Sucha Beskidzka. His mother, who had spent time living in New York City, nicknamed him Willy. He was the older brother of Billy Wilder. Their father owned a chain of railway restaurants. The family moved to Vienna at the onset of World War I.

Willy Wilder moved to London to live with relatives there in 1922 immediately following his graduation from high school in Vienna. He then went to the United States several year before his brother; arriving sometime in the mid-1920s. He originally worked in New York City as a maker of high end purses, under the corporate name of Wm. Wilder Co., Inc. This business was successful, and by the time his brother came to America in 1934 he accrued a considerable amount of wealth and was living in a mansion in Manhattan with his wife, his young son Myles, and several servants.

Billy Wilder went to Hollywood to work in films while Willy stayed in New York. With the huge success of his brother's film Double Indemnity (1944), Willy, who was then bored with life in New York, decided to uproot his life and move to Hollywood to follow his brother into a career in film. There he started his own film production company, W. Lee Wilder Productions, and produced his first film The Great Flamarion in 1945. He directed his first film The Glass Alibi the following year; the first of eight film noir works that he directed.

From 1949 to 1950, Wilder directed, wrote and produced 16 musical short subjects featuring traditional spirituals and folk-music. During the 1950s he formed a film production company called Planet Filmplays where he produced and directed several low budget science fiction films with screenplays cowritten by his son Myles.

Wilder died in Los Angeles on February 14, 1982, at the age of 77.

== Selected filmography ==
Director unless otherwise noted

- The Great Flamarion (1945) (producer)
- Strange Impersonation (1946) (producer)
- The Glass Alibi (1946)
- Yankee Fakir (1947)
- The Pretender (1947)
- The Vicious Circle (1948) (also known as Woman in Brown)
- Once a Thief (1950)
- Three Steps North (1951)
- Phantom from Space (1953)
- Killers from Space (1954)
- The Snow Creature (1954)
- The Big Bluff (1955)
- Fright (1956)
- Manfish (1956) (also known as Calypso)
- The Man Without a Body (1957)
- Spy in the Sky! (1958)
- Bluebeard's Ten Honeymoons (1960)
- The Omegans (1968)
- Caxambu (1971)
