= Ray McCarey =

American film director (1904–48)

- Born: Raymond Benedict McCarey; September 6, 1904; Los Angeles, California, U.S.
- Died: December 1, 1948 (aged 44); San Bernardino County, California, U.S.
- Occupation: Film director
- Years active: 1926–1948
- Spouse: Grace Thomas
- Children: 2

Raymond Benedict McCarey (September 6, 1904 – December 1, 1948) was an American film director, brother of director Leo McCarey.

== Biography ==
Ray McCarey was the son of boxing promoter Thomas McCarey. He was the younger brother of producer and director Leo McCarey. He studied to be a lawyer before he turned to the film industry. He was occasionally billed as Raymond McCarey but usually as Ray McCarey.

McCarey began working at Hal Roach Studios, where he did work on short films with Our Gang and Laurel and Hardy. He also worked with Roscoe Arbuckle, the Three Stooges, Lucille Ball, Bing Crosby, Louis Armstrong and Dorothy Dandridge among many others. Most of his feature film work consisted of "B" pictures and low-budget films. He directed 62 films between 1930 and 1948.

McCarey and his wife, the former Grace Thomas, had two children.

On December 1, 1948, McCarey was found dead kneeling beside his bed. Detectives said that two empty prescription bottles were found by his bed. His brother Leo McCarey said he had been in ill health for several months.

== Selected filmography ==
- Swing High (1930)
- Two Plus Fours (1930)
- Free Eats (1932)
- Scram! (1932)
- Pack Up Your Troubles (1932)
- In the Dough (1932)
- Close Relations (1933)
- Tomalio (1933)
- Girl o' My Dreams (1934)
- Men in Black (1934)
- Three Little Pigskins (1934)
- Sunset Range (1935)
- Three Cheers for Love (1936)
- Oh, Doctor (1937)
- Goodbye Broadway (1938)
- Outside These Walls (1939)
- You Can't Fool Your Wife (1940)
- It Happened in Flatbush (1942)
- That Other Woman (1942)
- Passport to Destiny (1944)
- Atlantic City (1944)
- Strange Triangle (1946)
- The Falcon's Alibi (1946)
