= Blonde Ice =

1948 film by Jack Bernhard

- Theatrical release poster
- Directed by: Jack Bernhard
- Screenplay by: Kenneth Gamet
- Based on: Once Too Often (1938 novel) by Whitman Chambers
- Produced by: Martin Mooney
- Starring: Leslie Brooks; Robert Paige; Michael Whalen
- Cinematography: George Robinson
- Edited by: W.L. Bagier; Jason H. Bernie
- Music by: Irving Gertz
- Production company: Martin Mooney Productions
- Distributed by: Film Classics
- Release date: July 24, 1948 (United States)
- Running time: 74 minutes
- Country: United States
- Language: English

Blonde Ice is a 1948 American crime film noir starring Leslie Brooks, Robert Paige, and Michael Whalen. Based on the 1938 novel Once Too Often by Elwyn Whitman Chambers, the B picture was directed by Jack Bernhard, with music by Irving Gertz.

Blonde Ice is available for free viewing and download at the Internet Archive.

== Plot ==
Society columnist Claire Cummings is about to marry wealthy Carl Henneman in his opulent mansion. Just after the ceremony, Claire sees her former lover Les Burns and tells him she'll continue to see him, despite her now being married.

While on their honeymoon in Los Angeles, Claire writes a love letter to Les and hides it, but Carl discovers it and tells her he's going to divorce her. She barely reacts at first, telling Carl that she's entitled to half their community property, but Carl says the letter is proof of adultery so she won't receive any compensation. Carl leaves to initiate divorce proceedings.

Claire hatches a plan. Pilot Blackie Talon is willing to fly her immediately to San Francisco and back. The next morning Claire asks Les to buy her an airline ticket and meet her at the airport. Claire asks him to drive to Carl's mansion so she can get some clothes. Upon arriving, Les discovers Carl's dead body in an easy chair, and a gun on the carpet. Les phones the police, although Claire seems unfazed. The police suspect Claire but she has a strong alibi: she was in Los Angeles at the time of the murder, and has the plane ticket and Les to back her up.

Les and Claire rekindle their romance. Claire wants Stanley Mason, an attorney running for Congress, to handle Carl's estate, and Stanley becomes her latest lover.

The police are leaning on Les as their prime suspect. Les realizes there are too many holes in the scenario of Carl's "suicide" and confronts Claire, telling her, "You're not a normal woman. You're not warm. You're cold, like ice. Yeah, like ice-- blonde ice."

Claire throws Les out and then pilot Blackie arrives, demanding $50,000 for his silence. He takes her necklace as a first installment. The next evening, Claire and Stanley are joined at dinner by psychologist Dr. Kippinger, who comments on her manipulative nature. The police close Carl's murder case due to insufficient evidence, but Blackie keeps demanding money. Claire offhandedly shoots him.

When Stanley celebrates his election victory, he announces that he is going to marry Claire. Les leaves the party in consternation; he is home alone, having a drink, when Claire enters and tells him she really loves him. At that moment Stanley walks in. Nothing Claire can say will dissuade him from breaking the engagement, so Claire murders Stanley with a knife. Les enters and picks up the knife, making it easy for her to pin the murder on him. The police arrest Les, but Dr. Kippinger is certain the real murderer is Claire. He confronts her at her newspaper office, and she calmly confesses to the murders of Carl, Blackie, and Stanley. Claire tries to shoot Kippinger but she grapples for the gun and is fatally wounded. Coworkers look down at the body. Les, leaving last, remarks she wasn't even a good reporter, and shuts the door behind him.

== Cast ==
- Robert Paige as Les Burns
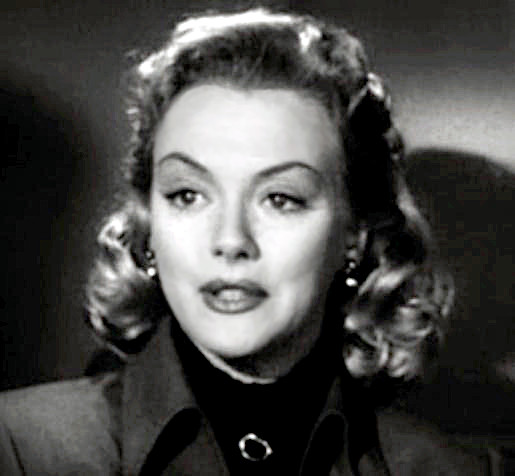
  Leslie Brooks as Claire Cummings Hanneman
- Leslie Brooks as Claire Cummings Hanneman
- Russ Vincent as Blackie Talon, the Pilot
- Michael Whalen as Stanley Mason, Attorney
- James Griffith as Al Herrick
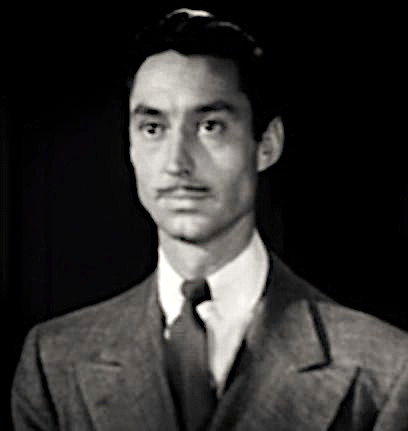
  James Griffith as Al Herrick
- Emory Parnell as Police Capt. Bill Murdock
- Walter Sande as Hack Doyle
- John Holland as Carl Hanneman
- Mildred Coles as June Taylor
- Selmer Jackson as District Attorney Ed Chalmers
- David Leonard as Dr. Geoffrey Kippinger

== Background ==
Blonde Ice was originally directed by Jack Bernhard, a British-American director responsible for films such as Decoy (1946), Unknown Island (1948), and The Second Face (1950). Some sources state that much acclaimed B movie director Edgar G. Ulmer was the uncredited original screenwriter of the film. although this may be an error of faulty memory. During a 1970 interview with director and film historian Peter Bogdanovich, Ulmer claimed that after the huge box office success of Double Indemnity (1944) he wrote a rip-off script with the working title Single Indemnity for film producer Sigmund Neufeld. He erroneously believed that Neufeld's film was finally released as Blonde Ice. However, Blonde Ice was neither produced by Neufeld, nor does its plot resemble that of Double Indemnity. The film Ulmer was actually referring to was released under the title Apology for Murder (1945).

Blonde Ice, which in its own time was little regarded as a second feature, had been considered lost until it was rediscovered through private collectors and restored by film historian Jay Fenton. The restored DVD release of the film by VCI Entertainment includes an interview with Fenton, who describes his role.

== Critical response ==
Film critic Dennis Schwartz wrote in 2002, "A minor film noir about a cold-hearted femme fatale who is capable of not only deceit but of murder. It's a precursor to the more hardboiled neo-noir films of today. Jack Bernhard directs a film that is based on a Whitney Chambers story, and allows the storyline to remain an oddity because of how ruthlessly cold and insane the femme fatale character played by Leslie Brooks is presented."

Critic Gary Johnson discussed the production and the storyline in his 2003 review, "The acting is merely adequate and the direction is severely hampered by the low budget (although director Jack Bernhard and cameraman George Robinson do manage a few surprising camera angles). But the screenplay is a deliciously nasty and audacious exposé on the twisted psyche of a truly lethal femme fatale. Claire Cummings is a golddigger with no conscience whatsoever. She's out for herself and if anyone gets in the way, well ... she packs a revolver and a sharp knife. Claire Cummings is one of the most deadly femme fatales in the history of film noir, easily fitting alongside such other brutal dames as Phyllis Dietrichson from Double Indemnity, Kathie Moffat from Out of the Past, Annie Laurie Starr from Gun Crazy, and Vera from Edgar G. Ulmer's own Detour.

== Novel ==
Much like the film, most copies of the novel have been lost. "Once Too Often" was published in 1938, yet is often referenced as a similar novel published in the same year, "Murder Lady", which was widely released by Chambers in the United Kingdom. The title of this work is now shared with that of a novel written by author Dorothy Simpson in 2016. The two works have no relation to one another, yet the popularity of Simpson's novel Made locating copies of Chambers’ work more difficult.

== See also ==
- List of films in the public domain in the United States
