= Peter Brocco =

American actor (1903–1992)

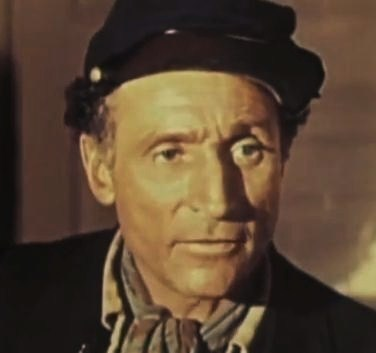
- Brocco in Drums in the Deep South (1951)
- Born: Carl Peter Brocco; January 16, 1903; Reading, Pennsylvania, U.S.
- Died: December 20, 1992 (aged 89); Los Angeles, California, U.S.
- Resting place: Gethsemane Cemetery; Laureldale, Pennsylvania, U.S.
- Occupation: Actor
- Years active: 1927–1991

Carl Peter Brocco (January 16, 1903 – December 20, 1992) was an American screen and stage actor. He appeared in over 300 credits, notably Spartacus (1960) and One Flew Over the Cuckoo's Nest (1975), during his career spanning over 60 years.

== Early years ==
Brocco was born in Reading, Pennsylvania. He was the son of Mr. and Mrs. Peter Brocco.

== Career ==
Brocco acted on stage with the Walter Hampton Players. He debuted on Broadway in Centuries (1927); he also performed in Shakespeare's The Merry Wives of Windsor (1938).

Brocco appeared as a criminal type in three episodes of TV's Adventures of Superman. He holds the distinction of having been killed off in two of them, a relative rarity for villains in the series. In the first, The Secret of Superman, he deduces that Kent is Superman, but is killed in a police shootout soon after. In The Clown Who Cried, he falls off a building and Superman is unable to save him. He also appeared as "The Spectre" in The Phantom Ring, where the criminals developed a machine that can make them invisible. Finally, in that episode, he survives, albeit rather banged up by Superman. Brocco was also on two episodes of Combat!, "The Long Walk" in 1964 and "The Flying Machine" in 1966. He appeared as Claymare, an Organian council member, in the Star Trek episode "Errand of Mercy", which established the uneasy treaty of peace between the United Federation of Planets and the Klingon Empire. In 1969, he played an artist on the TV series Adam-12.

Brocco displayed a comedic talent portraying Peter The Waiter for 8 episodes of The George Burns and Gracie Allen Show on CBS during its 1955–1956 season.

Brocco played Colonel Matterson, a patient who used a wheelchair and had dementia, in the Academy Award-winning One Flew Over the Cuckoo's Nest (1975). He also appeared as the patient in the hospital, Mr. Egan, in the Happy Days 1974 episode "Hardware Jungle". In 1983 he played Ali MacGraw's father in the epic TV miniseries The Winds of War.

Brocco lived for some 40 years in Laurel Canyon, in a 1920s Spanish style home on Laurel Canyon Blvd. near the Country Store. He had his ceramics studio in the ground floor, a source of income when he was blacklisted for a while during the red scare of the early 1950s.

== Death ==
Brocco died from a heart attack in Los Angeles on December 20, 1992, aged 89.

== Selected filmography ==
- Roar of the Dragon (1932) as Wireless Operator
- Devil and the Deep (1932) as Wireless Operator
- Stand By All Networks (1942) as Cab Driver
- The Return of Monte Cristo (1946) as Clerk
- Alias Mr. Twilight (1946) as Brick Robey
- The Lone Wolf in Mexico (1947) as Emil
- The Swordsman (1948) as Groom
- The Argyle Secrets (1948) as Scanlon
- The Vicious Circle (1948) as Dr. Georges Samosch
- The Saxon Charm (1948) as Cyril Leatham
- The Gallant Blade (1948) as Sergeant Jacques, Cadeau's Servant
- The Countess of Monte Cristo (1948) as Hotel Desk Clerk
- The Boy with Green Hair (1948) Bit Part
- Appointment with Murder (1948) as Giuseppe Donatti
- Boston Blackie's Chinese Venture (1949) as Rolfe
- The Undercover Man (1949) as Johnny
- Search for Danger (1949) as Morris Jason
- Susanna Pass (1949) as Coroner Carter
- The Lady Gambles (1949) as Horse Player
- Flaming Fury (1949) as E.V. Wessman
- Jolson Sings Again (1949) as Headwaiter
- Post Office Investigator (1949) as Bruno Antista
- Miss Grant Takes Richmond (1949) as Prospective Home Buyer, Father of Triplets
- The Reckless Moment (1949) as Pete, Bartender
- Tension (1949) as Balew
- House by the River (1950) as Harry – Coroner
- Key to the City (1950) as Waiter
- Gunmen of Abilene (1950) as Henry Turner
- Guilty of Treason (1950) as Judge Vilmos Oltey
- Black Hand (1950) as Roberto Columbo
- Champagne for Caesar (1950) as Fortune Teller
- The Gunfighter (1950) as Card Player
- Peggy (1950) as Bob Winters
- The Breaking Point (1950) as Macho
- Three Secrets (1950) as Stephani
- The Killer That Stalked New York (1950) as Tom the Wino
- Belle Le Grand (1951) as Tyler
- Flame of Stamboul (1951) as Sadik Raschin
- Francis Goes to the Races (1951) as Dr. Marberry
- The Great Caruso (1951) as Father Bronzetti
- The Fat Man (1951) as Racetrack Bookkeeper
- Sirocco (1951) as The Barber
- Hollywood Story (1951) as Charles Rodale
- The Tall Target (1951) as Fernandina
- His Kind of Woman (1951) as Thompson's First Henchman
- Chain of Circumstance (1951) as Clerk
- Drums in the Deep South (1951) as Union Corporal
- Roadblock (1951) as Bank Heist Man
- The Whip Hand (1951) as Nate Garr
- Too Young to Kiss (1951) as Waiter
- Radar Men from the Moon (1952) as Krog
- Harem Girl (1952) as Ameen
- Mutiny (1952) as Sykes, Gunner
- The Narrow Margin (1952) as Vincent Yost
- Young Man with Ideas (1952) as Butler
- Actor's and Sin (1952) as Mr. Herbert (segment "Actor's Blood")
- Cripple Creek (1952) as Cashier Ed
- Holiday for Sinners (1952) as Father
- Big Jim McLain (1952) as Dr. Carter
- The Ring (1952) as Barney Williams
- The Prisoner of Zenda (1952) as Johann
- Woman in the Dark (1952) as Nick Petzik
- The Bandits of Corsica (1953) as Angelo
- The Story of Three Loves (1953) as Bartender (segment "Mademoiselle")
- Invaders from Mars (1953) as Brainard, Wilson's Aide
- Ma and Pa Kettle on Vacation (1953) as Adolph Wade
- The Desert Song (1953) as Old Refugee
- El Alamein (1953) as Selim
- Duffy of San Quentin (1954) as Nealy
- Tobor the Great (1954) as Dr. Gustav
- Rogue Cop (1954) as George 'Wrinkles' Fallon
- The Atomic Kid (1954) as Comrade Mosley
- The Silver Chalice (1954) as Stall Keeper
- The Racers (1955) as Gatti
- Wyoming Renegades (1955) as Dawson
- I'll Cry Tomorrow (1955) as Doctor
- Diane (1956) as Court Painter
- Hot Blood (1956) as Doctor Robert Turchino
- Stranger at My Door (1956) as Saddler
- He Laughed Last (1956) as Al Fusary
- Black Patch (1957) as Harper
- Perry Mason (1959) (Season 2, Episode 16: "The Case of the Fraudulent Photo") - Theophile Duclerc
- Twilight Zone (1959) as Mr. Marshak in the episode “The Four of Us Are Dying”
- Compulsion (1959) as Albert, Steiner's Chauffeur
- Elmer Gantry (1960) as Benny, Photographer
- Spartacus (1960) as Ramon
- Let No Man Write My Epitaph (1960) as Salesman at Florist Shop
- Underworld U.S.A. (1961) as Vic Farrar
- Fear No More (1961) as Steve Cresca
- A Public Affair (1962) as Leonard Lohman
- The Three Stooges in Orbit (1962) as Doctor Appleby
- Hemingway's Adventures of a Young Man (1962) as Headwaiter
- The Interns (1962) as Arnold Auer
- The Balcony (1963) as Judge
- The Pleasure Seekers (1964) as Arturo
- Dark Intruder (1965) as Chi Zang
- Our Man Flint (1966) as Dr. Wu
- The Russians Are Coming, the Russians Are Coming (1966) as Reverend Hawthorne
- Star Trek: The Original Series (1967) as Claymare in the episode "Errand of Mercy"
- Enter Laughing (1967) as Lawyer Peabody
- Games (1967) as Count, Party Guest
- In Enemy Country (1968) as Prisoner at Factory Yard
- Dr. Heidegger's Experiment (1969) as Dr. Heidegger
- Some Kind of a Nut (1969) as Mr. Suzumi
- Hail, Hero! (1969) as Old Man #1
- The Comic (1969) as Minister
- Gaily, Gaily (1969) as Swami
- A Time for Dying (1969) as Seth
- Johnny Got His Gun (1971) as Ancient Prelate
- What's the Matter with Helen? (1971) as Old Man
- Fuzz (1972) as Man with Garbage
- Papillon (1973) as Doctor
- The Killing Kind (1973) as Louise's Father
- Homebodies (1974) as Mr. Blakely
- One Flew Over the Cuckoo's Nest (1975) as Colonel Matterson
- Raid on Entebbe (1976) as Mr. Scharf
- The One and Only (1978) as Autograph Hound
- Butch and Sundance: The Early Days (1979) as Old Robber
- Fighting Back (1982) as Donato
- Jekyll and Hyde... Together Again (1982) as Hubert Howes
- Twilight Zone: The Movie (1983) as Mr. Mute (Segment #2)
- Money to Burn (1983) as Harry
- Throw Momma from the Train (1987) as Old Man
- The War of the Roses (1989) as Elderly Mourner
- Other People's Money (1991) as Garfield's Office Valet

== Television ==
Year	Title	Role	Notes
1959	The Twilight Zone	Mr. Marshak	S1E13 "The Four of Us Are Dying”
1963	The Alfred Hitchcock Hour	Figaro	Season 2 Episode 5: "Blood Bargain"
1967	Star Trek	Claymare	S1:E26, "Errand of Mercy"
1967	The Monkees	Mr. Swezey	S2:E4, "Monkee Mayor"
1972	Adam-12	Father Janos	S5:E9, “Vendetta”
