= Film Classics =

Film Classics was an American film distributor active between 1943 and 1951. Established by George Hirliman and Irvin Shapiro, the company initially concentrated on re-releases of earlier hits by other producers, including Hal Roach, Alexander Korda, Samuel Goldwyn, David O. Selznick, and Edward Small, but began to handle new independent productions of a generally low-budget nature, starting in 1944.

George Hirliman left Film Classics in 1944 to enter the new field of television, then still in its experimental stages. Irvin Shapiro also moved on, establishing a film import-export concern. The new company president was Joseph Bernhard; under Bernhard, Film Classics began producing new, original features in 1947.

In October 1947 Film Classics was purchased outright by Cinecolor, to promote its color process in its own feature films. Joseph Bernhard, president of Film Classics, became vice president of Cinecolor. Seven months later, Cinecolor president and founder William Crespinel stepped down, and Bernhard assumed the Cinecolor presidency on May 15, 1948. In 1950, Film Classics merged with Eagle-Lion Films; the new firm, Eagle-Lion Classics, was itself absorbed by United Artists in 1951.

== Filmography ==
- I Was a Criminal (1945)
- A Boy, a Girl and a Dog (1946)
- The Spirit of West Point (1947)
- For You I Die (1947)
- Women in the Night (1948)
- Devil's Cargo (1948)
- Blonde Ice (1948)
- The Argyle Secrets (1948)
- Unknown Island (1948)
- Money Madness (1948)
- Sofia (1948)
- Miraculous Journey (1948)
- Inner Sanctum (1948)
- Appointment with Murder (1948)
- Alaska Patrol (1949)
- The Judge (1949)
- State Department: File 649 (1949)
- Daughter of the West (1949)
- The Lovable Cheat (1949)
- Amazon Quest (1949)
- C-Man (1949)
- Not Wanted (1949)
- Search for Danger (1949)
- Lost Boundaries (1949)
- The Pirates of Capri (1949)
- The Flying Saucer (1950)
- Guilty Bystander (1950)
- Cry Murder (1950)
- The Vicious Years (1950)
- Swiss Tour (retitled Four Days' Leave by Film Classics, 1950)
