= Karl Hajos =

Hungarian composer (1889–1950)

- Born: Hajós Károly; 28 January 1889; Budapest, Austria-Hungary
- Died: February 1, 1950 (aged 61); Los Angeles, United States
- Resting place: Hollywood Forever Cemetery
- Occupation: Composer
- Years active: 1928–1950
- Spouse: Elsa Rothschild (1916–1950) (his death) (1 child)

Karl Hajos (born Hajós Károly, January 28, 1889 – February 1, 1950) was a Hungarian composer who worked on many film scores. Born in the Austro-Hungarian Empire, Hajos emigrated to the United States in 1924 and worked in Hollywood. Beginning in the late silent era, he worked on over 100 films with a variety of directors and studios. He was one of nine composers employed on the 1931 Western Fighting Caravans. In 1934, he worked on Cecil B. Demille's thriller Four Frightened People. He was nominated for two Academy Awards, in 1944 and 1945 in the Music Score of a Dramatic or Comedy Picture category for Summer Storm and The Man Who Walked Alone, respectively.

== Selected filmography ==
- Loves of an Actress (1928)
- The Woman from Moscow (1928)
- Adoration (1928)
- Beggars of Life (1928)
- The Wolf of Wall Street (1929)
- The Sea God (1930)
- The Right to Love (1930)
- The Night of Decision (1931)
- Fighting Caravans (1931)
- Four Frightened People (1934)
- Werewolf of London (1935)
- Summer Storm (1944)
- Dangerous Intruder (1945)
- The Man Who Walked Alone (1945)
- Fog Island (1945)
- Secrets of Linda Hamilton (1945)
- The Mask of Diijon (1946)
- Wild West (1946)
- Wild Country (1947)
- Appointment with Murder (1948)
- The Lovable Cheat (1949)
- Search for Danger (1949)
- It's a Small World (1950)

== Bibliography ==
- Wierzbicki, Eugene. Music, Sound and Filmmakers: Sonic Style in Cinema. Routledge, 2012.
