= The Lovable Cheat =

1949 film by Richard Oswald

- Directed by: Richard Oswald
- Written by: Honoré de Balzac (play); Edward Lewis; Richard Oswald
- Produced by: Rosario Castagna; Edward Lewis; Richard Oswald
- Starring: Charles Ruggles; Peggy Ann Garner; Richard Ney
- Cinematography: Paul Ivano
- Edited by: W.L. Bagier
- Music by: Karl Hajos
- Production company: Skyline Pictures
- Distributed by: Film Classics
- Release date: May 11, 1949
- Running time: 75 minutes
- Country: United States
- Language: English

The Lovable Cheat is a 1949 American historical comedy film directed by Richard Oswald and starring Charles Ruggles, Peggy Ann Garner and Richard Ney. It is based on the 1848 play Mercadet Le Faiseur by Honoré de Balzac. It was the final film of the veteran Austrian director Oswald, who had fled into exile following the Nazi rise to power. Buster Keaton played a small supporting role in the film, as his career had seriously declined by this stage.

The films sets were designed by the art director Boris Leven.

== Plot ==
In France back in 1860, a gentleman by the name of Claude Mercadet lived in grandeur with his wife Pauline and his daughter Julie in a very well decorated mansion in the Bois de Bologne. Claude was one of the wealthiest men around Paris. Unfortunately he was a fraud, and he had been running up bills for quite some time, paying one creditor with the money he got from another, creating a downwards spiral of unfortune. His house was in fact not built with brick but with straw, and it was about to collapse. As it does, a bailiff calls on him to confiscate his property as security for his long overdue loan and tax payments. The bailiff starts to reclaim all of Claude's possessions, and Claude also gets a note from each of his creditors, Pierquin, Goulard and Violette, and they threaten to throw him in jail unless the debts are paid in full.

Claude tries to calm down his wife Pauline by telling her he is about to have a big reception for the Count de la Brive. The count is very much interested in marrying their daughter Julie. The count incidentally happens to be the wealthiest man in Paris. Claude calls for his butler Justin, and orders him to invite as many of his creditors as he can and the count to a reception the very next day. Since the creditors will profit from Julie's marriage to the count, Claude expects them to contribute with money to the reception. Claude's cook Virginie also promised that Claude's former partner Godeau would pay back what he owed and took from Claude when he ran off to America.

Thérèse, the maid, is asked to entertain the bailiff, who is getting quite drunk on Claude's wine. In the meantime Claude tells Julie that they are bankrupt and that he wants her to marry, to solve this money problem. Julie is excited at first when she hears about the plans for her marriage, but when she understands that it is the count that is her intended husband, she is very disappointed. Justin returns to report that the count indeed will attend the reception the next day. The bad news is that the count brings one of his creditors, Goulard, to the reception, and he demands that his debts are settled immediately. Claude has to convince Goulard to wait a little longer, and even gets an additional loan of five hundred francs. Claude uses the money to pay off the creditors who are waiting in the kitchen.

Julie disturbs Claude's plans when she tells her father that she will refuse to attend the reception, as she has fallen in love with Jacques Minard, who is a bank clerk. Claude feels the need to investigate the young man, as he suspects that he is a gold digger who is only interested in Julie because he thinks she is rich.

Before Jacques arrives, a creditor by the name of Violette shows up at Claude's house. She has a bad cold, and Claude gives her a remedy in the form of a fake medicine. He also convinces her to invest five thousand francs in the marketing of the "medicine".

When young Jacques shows up Claude reveals that the family is on the brink of financial ruin. To Claude's surprise Jacques doesn't change his mind about marrying Julie. In an attempt to persuade Jacques, Claude tells him that because of the expected poverty Julie probably would be getting old and wrinkled before her time. Seeing the logic in this, Jacques agrees with Claude that Julie should marry the count instead. He goes on to tell Julie, and she thinks he is rejecting her because they are poor.

When the count arrives to the reception he professes his love for Julie and tells her details of his enormous wealth. Claude inquires of the count if he has any debts at all, and the count confesses that he indeed has one small debt to settle. Claude is off to tell Julie the good news about the count's financial status. When he is gone, the count discovers that most of Claude's property is marked with "confiscated". When Claude returns the count confronts him about this.

Just then, the bailiff comes up to them and reveals that he is about to perform the same task the next day at the count's place. Both Claude and the count realize simultaneously that they have been trying to pull the same trick on each other. They mutually decide to go ahead with the marriage anyway, to keep up a good face to their respective creditors. They discover that they have the creditor Pierquin in common and that they both have assured the creditor, without stating the details, that they will secure their financial gains through a marriage in the near future. They agree on not telling the creditor the detailed circumstances and orders Justin not to let the man in to the reception.

Everything is fine until the creditor Pierquin and his wife arrive and want to attend. Justin lies and tells them they have arrived at the wrong house and shuts the door in their face. Pierquin doesn't swallow this lie, but enters the house through an open window. Once inside, he declares the count a swindler. The other creditors realize they too have been had, and all demand immediate settlement of the count's debts. They threaten to throw both Claude and the count in jail if they don't pay, and even send for a carriage to the prison.

In this hour of need Claude reveals to Julie that he has indeed persuaded Jacques to stand down as suitor. Claude and the count concoct a plan to deceive the creditor. The count is to disguise himself and pose as Claude's former partner Godeau, who arrives at the house directly from America with loads of cash. Claude and the count believe this should stall the creditors a little longer. Before "Godeau" has time to arrive, Claude is put into the prison carriage. Jacques returns in the company of Julie, and he promises that he will collect enough money to pay off Claude's creditors once and for all.

The faux Godeau finally arrives, announced at the reception by Justin, and the creditors become ecstatic with joy, but in a spurt of moral abundance Claude decides to confess his deceitfulness and reveal that the Godeau that has arrived in fact is a fake. Claude's wife Pauline, Jacques and Julie intervene, and insist that Godeau is the real one. Claude changes his mind and plays along, saying that he was making up the story about the count being Godeau. Claude receives a message from the real Godeau and promises everyone that they will be paid in full the very next day. Grateful for the count's help, Claude lends him money to get him back on track. In doing so, Claude fulfills his long dream of being a creditor.

== Main cast ==
- Charles Ruggles as Claude Mercadet
- Peggy Ann Garner as Julie Mercadet
- Richard Ney as Jacques Minard
- Alan Mowbray as Justin
- Iris Adrian as Madame Mercadet
- Ludwig Donath as Violette
- Fritz Feld as Monsieur Louis
- John Wengraf as Pierquin
- Otto Waldis as Bailiff
- Edna Holland as Madame Pierquin
- Minerva Urecal as Virginie
- Helen Servis as Madame Goulard
- Jody Gilbert as Madame Violette
- Judith Trafford as Therese
- Buster Keaton as Goulard
- Curt Bois as Count de la Brive

== See also ==
- Mercadet (1936)

== Bibliography ==
- Langman, Larry. Destination Hollywood: The Influence of Europeans on American Filmmaking. McFarland & Co, 2000.
- Neibaur, James L. The fall of Buster Keaton. Scarecrow Press, 2010.
