= Jimmy the Chimp =

Male chimpanzee animal actor

Jimmy
- Species: Chimpanzee
- Sex: Male
- Born: 1952; Portuguese East Africa (now Mozambique)
- Died: May 1968 (aged 15–16); Perth Zoo, Perth, Australia
- Occupation: Acting
- Owner: John Calvert

Jimmy (1952–1968) was a male chimpanzee and animal actor, trained by actor and magician John Calvert. He performed in the 1956 film Dark Venture, alongside Calvert. Jimmy was also featured in Calvert's magic shows in the United States, and onboard his luxury yacht throughout Asia and Australia. He died of a heart attack at the age of 16 at the Perth Zoo.

== Career ==
Jimmy was born in Portuguese East Africa (now Mozambique) around 1952. He was captured from the wild by John Calvert to appear in the "white hunter" film Dark Venture (1956). Calvert was a travelling magician, film actor, and director. He received fame for playing the debonair detective Michael Waring (aka 'The Falcon'). He was also a notorious self-promoter and claimed that Jimmy was the same chimpanzee who played Cheeta in Johnny Weissmuller Tarzan movies. However, this was a fabrication, as the last of these Tarzan films was released in 1948, several years before Jimmy was born. Calvert shot Dark Venture on location in East Africa in 1953, but the film was not released until 1956. After filming, Calvert brought Jimmy back to California to live and work with him.

In 1957, Calvert and Jimmy set sail on a tour of the Pacific, onboard the luxury yacht Sea Fox. They performed magic shows in Honolulu, Korea, Japan, Singapore, Malaysia, the Philippines, before finally arriving in Darwin in June 1959. Jimmy was almost fully grown by they time the yacht arrived in Australia. He purportedly became very difficult to manage at sea, often attacking Calvert and members of the crew.

Jimmy was denied entry by Darwin quarantine officers, who warned Calvert that the animal would be put down if brought ashore. Instead Calvert kept him onboard the yacht, and arranged with the Taronga Park Zoo to take Jimmy when they arrived in Sydney. The zoo was reportedly "delighted" by the prospect of receiving a young male chimpanzee.

However, trouble struck in July 1959, when the Sea Fox became lost at sea on its passage from Darwin to Sydney. The yacht began taking water, its pumps failed, and it had to be rescued by HMAS Emu, which towed Calvert, Jimmy and crew to the nearby Elcho Island. The Indigenous locals of Elcho Island were astounded by Calvert's magic tricks and even more astounded by the sight of a chimpanzee, whose likeness they entered into rock art. According to researcher Brian Hubber, they referred to the Sea Fox as the "monkey ship" and "there was even talk of creating a 'monkey ship' corroboree." The famous Indigenous Australian musician Geoffrey Gurrumul Yunupingu was a native of Elcho Island, and according to biographer Robert Hillman, Gurrumul encountered Jimmy and even nicknamed his drummer after the animal. While Calvert flew on to Sydney to continue his tour, Jimmy was abandoned on Elcho Island, before being rescued by Sir Edward Hallstrom of the Taronga Park Zoo. Salvage expert Carl Atkinson managed to repair the Sea Fox and sail it back to Darwin, where he claimed the yacht as his own and sold it.

Jimmy occupied an enclosure in the Taronga Park Zoo from 1959 to 1962. After failing to breed with female chimpanzees, he was relocated to the Perth Zoo. Jimmy was a popular attraction at both zoos, with many visitors believing the fable that he was the same animal who starred in the Tarzan films. They were also entertained by the sight of a smoking monkey.

Jimmy died in May 1968 at the young age of 16 years. A post mortem revealed heart attack, probably caused by smoking, to be the cause of his death. His body was offered to the Western Australian Museum, where his skull and death mask are currently kept.

== See also ==
- List of individual apes
