= Appointment with Murder =

1948 American crime film

- Directed by: Jack Bernhard
- Written by: Joel Malone; Harold Swanton; Don Martin; Michael Arlen
- Produced by: Jack Bernhard
- Starring: John Calvert; Catherine Craig; Jack Reitzen; Lyle Talbot
- Cinematography: Walter Strenge
- Edited by: Asa Boyd Clark
- Music by: Karl Hajos
- Production company: Falcon Pictures Corporation
- Distributed by: Film Classics
- Release date: November 24, 1948
- Running time: 67 minutes
- Country: United States
- Language: English

Appointment with Murder is a 1948 American crime film directed by Jack Bernhard and starring John Calvert, Catherine Craig and Jack Reitzen. The film is one of three made by the low-budget Film Classics company featuring Calvert as The Falcon who had previously been played by George Sanders and Tom Conway for RKO.

== Plot ==
The Falcon travels to Milan to locate some stolen paintings for an insurance company. He follows the trail from a murdered Italian painter to an art gallery in Los Angeles.

== Cast ==
- John Calvert as Michael Waring, the Falcon
- Catherine Craig as Lorraine W. Brinckley
- Jack Reitzen as Norton Benedict
- Lyle Talbot as Fred Muller
- Peter Brocco as Giuseppe Donatti
- Ben Welden as Martin Minecci
- Robert Conte as Count Dano
- Jay Griffith as Detective
- Michael Mark as 2nd Baggage Clerk
- Carlo Schipa as Mario Farello
- Anna Demetrio as Senora Rosa - Italian Woman
- Carole Donne as Miss Connors
- Barbara Freking as Barbara O'Brien - The Model
- Jack Chefe as Johnny - Hotel Clerk
- Eugene Gericke as 1st Thug
- James Griffith as Detective
- Pat Lane as Customs Officer
- Robert Nadell as 1st Baggage Clerk
- Frank Richards as 2nd Thug
- Carl Sklover as Guard
- Eric Wilton as Count Dano's Butler

== Bibliography ==
- Hardy, Phil. The BFI Companion to Crime. University of California Press, 1997.
