= U.S. Marshal (TV series) =

1960s American television series

U.S. Marshal is a syndicated American television series featuring John Bromfield as Frank Morgan, a modern-day sheriff who agrees to take over from a marshal who was shot and killed. It is a spinoff of The Sheriff of Cochise (1956–1958), which also starred Bromfield as Morgan and is also set in Cochise, Arizona. The show ran for two seasons, from 1958 to 1960. Marshal Morgan battles crooks of every variety from car thieves to safecrackers to killers to conmen. This was Bromfield's last role; he retired shortly afterward and became a commercial fisherman.

Robert Altman directed 15 episodes from 1959 to 1960. James Griffith (27 episodes, according to IMDb), Robert Brubaker (12) and Buck Young (9) played Morgan's deputies.

The show has been released to both VHS and DVD.
