= The Sheriff of Cochise =

TV program

- Genre: Police procedural; Neo-Western
- Created by: Stan Jones; Mort Briskin
- Starring: John Bromfield
- Country of origin: United States
- Original language: English
- No. of seasons: 2
- No. of episodes: 79

Production
- Production location: Arizona
- Running time: 30 mins.
- Production company: Desilu Productions

Original release
- Network: Broadcast syndication
- Release: September 21, 1956 – December 27, 1957

The Sheriff of Cochise is an American police crime drama television series of 79 black-and-white episodes broadcast from 1956 to 1958. The show has two seasons of 39 episodes, and there is an additional standalone episode. Each episode runs for 30 minutes. The series features John Bromfield as Frank Morgan, the sheriff of Cochise County, Arizona. The series is succeeded by U.S. Marshal, in which Morgan was promoted to be the United States marshal for Arizona.

== Plot ==
Frank Morgan is the sheriff of Cochise County, Arizona, and his duties force him to go after people breaking the law in his home county. These include robbers, thugs, con artists, killers, and other lawbreakers. The series is based on Westerns, though with a contemporary twist as in the neo-Western sub-genre. Morgan drives a Chrysler station wagon, rarely fights personally, and uses radios and fingerprints to aid in his investigations.

== Cast ==
=== Main cast ===
- John Bromfield as Frank Morgan, the sheriff of Cochise County, Arizona (79 episodes)
- Stan Jones as Harry Olson, a sheriff's deputy and Morgan's second-in-command (63 episodes)

=== Recurring cast ===
- Roy Engel as Bob Tobin, a sheriff's deputy (7 episodes)
- Joe Kirk as Edgar Dawson (4 episodes)
- Robert Brubaker as Blake, a sheriff's deputy (3 episodes)
- Harry Shannon as Caleb (3 episodes)
- Dale Van Sickel as Clifford (3 episodes)
- Joseph Sargent as Amon Lattimer (3 episodes)
- James Griffith as Tom Ferguson, a sheriff's deputy (3 episodes)
- Joe De Santis as Jack Sanford (2 episodes)
- Peter Whitney as Oney (2 episodes)
- Frank Ferguson as Briscoe (2 episodes)
- John Dennis as Mike Lawton (2 episodes)
- Claudia Bryar as Vera Bennett (2 episodes)
- Alan Wells as Jim Clark, a sheriff's deputy (2 episodes)
- Kathleen Mulqueen as Martha (2 episodes)
- Frank Richards as Andy (2 episodes)
- Ray Lamont as Fred Sanders (2 episodes)
- John Doucette as Vince Walker (2 episodes)
- Douglass Dumbrille as Judson Knox (2 episodes)
- Trevor Bardette as Carter (2 episodes)
- Jack Albertson as Greenbriar Merritt (2 episodes)
- Joseph V. Perry as Tom Wylie (2 episodes)
- William Forrest as Whittiker, a local judge (2 episodes)
- Hugh Sanders as Ben Blair (2 episodes)
- Ed Kemmer as Ed, a sheriff's deputy (2 episodes)
- Jeanne Bates as Maude Larkin (2 episodes)
- Fred Graham as Dave Snyder (2 episodes)
- Mack Williams as Greenwald, a local doctor (2 episodes)
- Robert Foulk as Emory Riggs (2 episodes)
- Helen Wallace as Ellie Murdock (2 episodes)
- Howard Wendell as Edwin Hatrick (2 episodes)
- Dennis Cross as Fred Jameson (2 episodes)
- Richard Reeves as Joe Franklin (2 episodes)
- Primo Carnera as Otto Povich (2 episodes)
- Frank Worden as Joe Heap (2 episodes)

=== Guest cast ===
- Chris Alcaide
- Russ Bender
- Charles Bronson
- Sidney Clute
- Russ Conway
- Dennis Cross
- Barry Curtis
- Michael Emmet
- Dean Fredericks
- Robert Fuller
- Ron Hagerthy
- Robert Hinkle
- Michael Hinn
- Wright King
- Herbert Lytton
- James Parnell
- Joseph V. Perry
- Mike Ragan
- Richard Reeves
- Alan Wells
