= The Argyle Secrets =

1948 film by Cy Endfield

- Lobby card
- Directed by: Cy Endfield
- Screenplay by: Cy Endfield
- Based on: The Argyle Album; 1945 radio play by Cyril Endfield
- Produced by: Sam X. Abarbanel; Alan H. Posner
- Starring: William Gargan; Marjorie Lord
- Cinematography: Mack Stengler
- Edited by: Gregg G. Tallas
- Music by: Raoul Kraushaar (as Ralph Stanley)
- Production company: Eronel Productions
- Distributed by: Film Classics (US)
- Release date: May 7, 1948
- Running time: 64 minutes
- Country: United States
- Language: English
- Budget: $125,000

The Argyle Secrets is a 1948 American film noir mystery thriller written and directed by Cy Endfield (billed as "Cyril Endfield) and starring William Gargan and Marjorie Lord. It was based on a half-hour radio play by Endfield, originally heard on CBS's Suspense. The film was made for a micro-budget of $100,000 and shot in eight days.

Endfield admirer Jonathan Rosenbaum called it the first Endfield film "that he would later recall with any pride or affection... a surprisingly beautiful Z-budget thriller hastily adapted from his first radio script and shot in six days."

== Plot ==
In a voice-over narration, reporter Harry Mitchell wonders aloud how unnamed events could have all happened in 24 hours. A montage of sinister faces appears as he continues to wonder whether such people as these could have "come out of nowhere and be gone again in one day." The montage reveals that Mitchell is typing these words, dissolving to a shot of reporter Allen Pierce, "the top man of Washington's political columnists," lying in a hospital bed. Mitchell reveals that Pierce had checked into the hospital after promising his readers information about "the Argyle Album," which would create a political scandal greater than the Teapot Dome affair.

At the hospital, a doctor allows Mitchell to see Pierce, who despite his doctor's objections, has been at work with his secretary Elizabeth Court. When she and the doctor leave, Mitchell asks about the Argyle Album and Pierce replies that it's not the safest kind of information to know but that he feels the need to share it with somebody. As Pierce shows Mitchell a photostat of the album's cover, he suddenly turns very ill and dies.

Mitchell calls his photographer, nicknamed "Pinky," into the room and leaves him to watch the body while he phones the newspaper. When he returns to the room with the doctor and other hospital staff, a scalpel is found lodged in Pierce's chest. Soon after, Mitchell tells police lieutenant Samuel Sampson that the blade could not have killed the already-dead man. When a nurse reveals that Pinky had never left the room, the photographer's body is found behind a screen, and in the resulting confusion Mitchell runs away.

Mitchell goes to Elizabeth Court's apartment and knocks her unconscious while he looks for the Argyle Album, which he does not find. He does find Pierce's address book with five names in it and for safekeeping mails Pierce's photostat of the album cover to himself. Just then, a heavyset man with a Southern accent and wearing a panama hat enters brandishing a swordstick. Mitchell overcomes him and locks him in a closet as the bound and gagged Elizabeth looks on. As Mitchell is leaving the apartment, he lets in another woman claiming to be a friend of Elizabeth and runs off to hide for a while at a friend's vacant apartment.

The woman who was entering Elizabeth's apartment, named Marla, has tracked Mitchell to his friend's place, revealing that his face is in all the newspapers as a wanted man and that she wants the Argyle Album, offering him money. When Mitchell says that he doesn't even know what the album is, Marla lets in three sinister men—Winter, Hobrey, and Scanlon. Mitchell is beaten, fading in and out of consciousness as Winter tells how he had smuggled the Argyle Album out of Europe after World War Ii as security for his future.

When Mitchell comes to, Marla explains that the Argyle Album contains information about American businessmen who had collaborated with the enemy, making it a valuable tool for blackmail. The album had been stolen from where Winter hid it. Believing that Pierce had located the album Winter suspected that the columnist had given it to Mitchell. Marla lets Mitchell escape by letting him choke her (after which he kisses her). Climbing down the building's fire escape, he enters another apartment through the window. That apartment turns out to belong to his own former neighbors, the Rubins. Mrs.Rubin helps him clean up from his ordeal, and Mitchell leaves without Mrs. Rubin's older son, a policeman, noticing that he is a wanted man.

Mitchell goes to one of the addresses in Pierce's book, a shop on Wooster Street, a run-down neighborhood at the time. The place is run by Joe McBrod, a fence for stolen goods who now has the album and had been Pierce's contact. Pulling a gun on Mitchell, McBrod is shot by Panama Archie, the heavyset man Mitchell had met earlier and who had gotten this address from Elizabeth Court. McBrod recovers just enough to shoot Panama, but collapses again without telling Mitchell where the album is.

Mitchell decides to turn himself into Lt. Sampson, who tells him that an autopsy has confirmed that Pierce died from poisoning, not the scalpel, and that Pinky had been killed by another scalpel stabbing, having gotten in somebody's way. Sampson still does not know how the murders might connect with the Argyle Album and lets Mitchell go home, though policemen shadow him. Shaking off those shadows, Mitchell goes to meet Marla at her hotel, as she had proposed. Waking her up, Mitchell coerces Marla into explaining McBrod's connections to her and her accomplices. Although she changes details of her story, she claims that Winter's gang still did not know where the album is but that Panama seemed to have been working for someone else.

Mitchell next goes to Scanlon's apartment, where he intercepts a phone call from Winter and returns to McBrod's shop, where Winter and Hobrey lie in wait. Wounded by a gunshot from Hobrey, Mitchell takes refuge in a locked storage area. As Hobrey prepares an acetylene torch to cut his way in, Mitchell now reveals that he has figured out that two "big shots" named in the album were after it. One had Pierce's doctor and Panama working for him, the other is the man who has been posing as the real Winter.

As "Winter" prepares to burn Mitchell out of his hiding place, the reporter claims that he has the Argyle Album, describing the cover to them using Pierce's photostat. Mitchell tells Hobrey that the fake Winter is planning to double-cross and kill him. Winter shoots Hobrey, who is still strong enough to kill him before he finally collapses.

Mitchell now realizes that McBrod must have mailed the Argyle Album to Pierce, whose secretary, Elizabeth Court, must now have it. Mitchell meets Court at the airport, paying her five hundred dollars for a briefcase containing the album. As she leaves, Marla appears, having followed Mitchell to the airport. The two explain some remaining details of the affair, with Mitchell stating that he feels an obligation to Pierce to make the album's revelations public. Marla says that she and Mitchell belong together but then pulls a gun on him although she would have been willing to share the money the album could have brought. Mitchell, though, is able to convey the briefcase to Lt. Sampson, who has been watching, and Marla leaves. Not knowing anything to do with the Argyle Album, Sampson returns the briefcase to Mitchell, who feigns his own ignorance and walks away.

== Cast ==
- Harry Mitchell as William Gargan
- Maria as Marjorie Lord
- Lt. Samuel Sampson as Ralph Byrd
- Panama Archie as Jack Reitzen
- Winter as John Banner
- Elizabeth Court as Barbara Billingsley
- Jor McBrod as Alex Frazer
- Scanlon as Peter Brocco
- Allen Pierce – George Anderson
- Gil Hobrey as Mickey Simpson
- 'Pinky' Pincus as Alvin Hammer
- The Nurse as Carole Donne
- Mrs. Rubin as Mary Tarcai
- Melvyn Rubin Cop as Robert Kellard
- Gerald Rubin as Kenneth Greenwald

== Production ==
The film was based on a radio play "The Argyle Album" by Cy Endfield. It was presented twice, once with Robert Taylor in 1945, another time with Edmund O'Brien in 1947.

CBS sold the film rights. The film was made by a new independent outfit, Cronel Productions, established by Sam X. Abarbanel and Alan H. Posner. The film was announced in January 1948 and took place in February.

== Critical reception ==
Rosenbaum wrote, "There are so many interlocking and often paranoid intrigues crammed into one twenty-four-hour story line that even after three viewings I'd defy anyone to come up with a complete synopsis. The sheer darkness of the night scenes only intensifies our occasional perplexity, though it must be added that Endfield and his cinematographer, Mack Stengler, create many remarkable and arresting noir compositions out of this interminable stretch of night, usually with what appear to be minimal light sources."

Variety wrote the film "adds up to okay supporting material.... Film is on the talky side, but has been well paced and has an interesting plot."

TV Guide called the film an "often exciting low-budget thriller." Variety called the film "a particularly interesting B movie in its suggestion that the U.S. government secretly brought Nazis into the country to work for the military."

== Preservation ==
The Argyle Secrets was preserved and restored by the UCLA Film and Television Archive. Restoration funding provided by the Film Noir Foundation and the Hollywood Foreign Press Association's Charitable Trust (the HFPA Trust). Restored from a 35mm nitrate composite dupe negative. The restoration premiered at the UCLA Festival of Preservation in 2022.
