= Decoy (1946 film) =

1946 film by Jack Bernhard

- Theatrical release poster
- Directed by: Jack Bernhard
- Screenplay by: Nedrick Young
- Story by: Stanley Rubin
- Produced by: Jack Bernhard; Bernard Brandt
- Starring: Jean Gillie; Robert Armstrong
- Cinematography: L. William O'Connell
- Edited by: Jason H. Bernie
- Music by: Edward J. Kay
- Production companies: Bernhard-Brandt Productions; Pathe Pictures
- Distributed by: Monogram Pictures
- Release date: September 14, 1946 (United States)
- Running time: 76 minutes
- Country: United States
- Language: English

Decoy is a 1946 American film noir starring Jean Gillie, Edward Norris, Robert Armstrong, Herbert Rudley, and Sheldon Leonard. Directed by Jack Bernhard, it was produced by him and Bernard Brandt as a Jack Bernhard Production, with a screenplay by Nedrick Young based on an original story by Stanley Rubin.

Jean Gillie, the wife of Jack Bernhard at the time, played the femme fatale central to the picture's story.

== Plot ==
A man, who is later revealed to be Dr. Lloyd Craig, hitchhikes from a gas station in rural California to a San Francisco apartment, where he exchanges gunfire with a young woman.

Police Detective Joe Portugal arrives on the scene, finding the man dead and the woman mortally wounded. Detective Portugal interrogates the woman, and she recounts recent events.

The woman is revealed to be Margot Shelby, the lover of Frankie Olins, a man sentenced to death in the gas chamber for murder. The murder was committed while robbing $400,000 from an armored car. The money was never recovered, and it's believed Frankie hid the fortune in a safe place.

Margot no longer loves Frankie, and she concocts a plan with a new lover, Jim Vincent, to discover the location of Frankie's money.

Initially, the pair attempt to appeal Frankie's conviction. When that plan fails, it seems Frankie's execution is inevitable. Margot's plan is to allow Frankie to be executed by lethal hydrogen cyanide gas, and then revive him with a chemical known as methylene blue. Margot explains that it is a chemical she "read about long ago". She seduces the prison physician Dr. Lloyd Craig into helping implement this plan.

Frankie is executed, and his body is removed from the prison without an autopsy. Margot's hired thugs murder the hearse driver to maintain secrecy and to have a body to use as a decoy for cremation, and the body of Olins is delivered to Dr. Craig's office. Dr. Craig administers methylene blue to Frankie's dead body via a breathing mask, and Frankie is returned to life.

Frankie is briefly disoriented when he is restored to life, but is convinced to reveal the location of his stolen money with a hand-drawn map. After doing this, he is shot to death by Jim Vincent.

Margot, Jim, and Dr. Craig drive together to recover Frankie's money. En route, Margot murders Jim by running him over after he changes the car's tire.

Once Margot and Dr. Craig reach the loot's burial location, she forces the doctor to dig at gunpoint. He retrieves a wooden strongbox. Margot gleefully takes the strongbox and shoots Dr. Craig twice while laughing hysterically.

The film returns to the present, with Dr. Craig's motivation for shooting Margot revealed. As the dying Margot finishes her tale to detective Portugal she implores him to open the strongbox so she can touch the money. Drawing her last breaths, she purrs to "Jo-Jo" to come down to her level for once and kiss her. As he leans forward, she pulls back and laughs haughtily in his face, humiliating him in front of the gathering of police and medics, then dies.

Portugal opens the box, only to find it filled with scrap paper and a single envelope. In the envelope is a one dollar bill and a note addressed to "you who double crossed me".

== Cast ==
- Jean Gillie as Margot Shelby
- Robert Armstrong as Frank Olins
- Herbert Rudley as Dr. Craig
- Edward Norris as Jim Vincent
- Sheldon Leonard as Sgt. Portugal
- Philip Van Zandt as Tommy (credited as Phil Van Zandt)
- Marjorie Woodworth as Dr. Craig's nurse
- Carole Donne as Waitress
- John Shay as Al
- Bert Roach as Bartender
- Rosemary Bertrand as Ruth

== Reception ==
New York's PM was positive upon the picture's release: "One thing a good B picture knows—and Decoy is a good B—is how to tell its story....Tell it straight, fast, and simple....Make the motives plain, the characterizations clear....Decoy, and Jean Gillie and Marjorie Woodworth, stick to the rules. Miss Gillie's wicked, Miss Woodward's Florence Nightingale, but their costumes define them alike. Otherwise Miss Gillie, who's after the four hundred grand her first bank robber-killer's meanly stashed away, zings through plenty of direct action tactics, with accompanying double-crosses, before she gets it, and the proper Johnston office wages. It takes her 70 minutes to collect them, but that's only because she's deservedly shot at the beginning of the picture, which then explains why. Well, if ever a girl had it coming to her, that Miss Gillie is the one."

The contemporary Philadelphia Inquirer thought the story "clumsily told, and unrelieved by humor. A quirk ending does not suffice for killing most of the suspense by having the story told in flashback. Herbert Rudley is the most believable of the cast, as the physician whose ideals crash."

Film critic Glenn Erickson liked the film, writing in 2007, "After 1978 Decoy rarely or never appeared on television or in museum screenings. In 2000 the American Cinematheque showed it with the writer of its original story, Stanley Rubin, in attendance. The movie brought the house down with its odd mix of melodrama, hardboiled gimmicks and unrestrained sadism. I thought then that, as far as violence goes, Decoy was to 1946 what Pulp Fiction is to 1994."

Film critic Dennis Schwartz gave the film a mixed review in 2019, writing, "Jack Bernhard directs a darkly atmospheric but disjointed film noir that is rife with plot inconsistencies. The film's main virtue is the sinister performance by British newcomer Jean Gillie as Margot Shelby, who is the nonredeemable femme fatale with a history of using men and even resorting to violence to achieve her ends. Gillie is one of the more cruel femme fatales in film noir lore."

Shown on the Turner Classic Movies show 'Noir Alley' with Eddie Muller on December 3, 2022.
