= Alaska Patrol =

- Directed by: Jack Bernhard
- Screenplay by: Arthur Hoerl
- Produced by: James S. Burkett
- Starring: Richard Travis; Helen Westcott; Emory Parnell; Richard Fraser; James Griffith; Ralf Harolde
- Cinematography: Marcel Le Picard
- Edited by: Charles Craft
- Music by: Mahlon Merrick
- Production company: Burwood Pictures Corp.
- Distributed by: Film Classics
- Release date: March 10, 1949
- Running time: 61 minutes
- Country: United States
- Language: English

Alaska Patrol is a 1949 American spy action film directed by Jack Bernhard and written by Arthur Hoerl. The film stars Richard Travis, Helen Westcott, Emory Parnell, Richard Fraser, James Griffith and Ralf Harolde. The film was released on March 10, 1949, by Film Classics.

== Plot ==
Foreign agent Paul Rattick is caught stealing secret U.S. Navy documents and killed when trying to escape. Naval Intelligence officer Captain Wright and Operative Dale are tasked with finding who is behind the spy network that employed Rattick. They are joined by Agent Tom Norman, who is Rattick's spitting image.

== Cast ==
- Richard Travis as Tom Norman / Paul Rattick
- Helen Westcott as Mary Lynn
- Emory Parnell as Captain Jan Roburt
- Richard Fraser as Operative Farrell
- James Griffith as Operative Dale
- Ralf Harolde as Edward Steele
- Selmer Jackson as Captain Wright
- Gene Roth as Ehrlich
- William Tannen as Dajek
- Otto Reichow as Eric Balser
- Pierre Watkin as Mr. Sigmund
- Paul Bryar as Commander Braddock
- William Haade as Andrus
- Jason Robards Sr. as Dr. Loring
