= Selmer Jackson =

American actor (1888–1971)

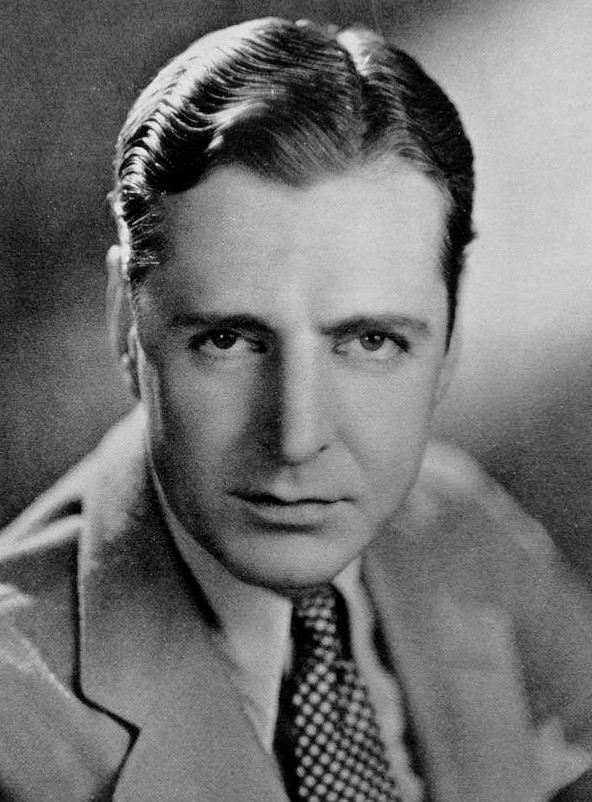
- Jackson in 1930
- Born: Selmer Adolf Jackson; May 7, 1888; Lake Mills, Iowa, U.S.
- Died: March 30, 1971 (aged 82); Burbank, California, U.S.
- Resting place: Valhalla Memorial Park Cemetery
- Occupation: Actor
- Years active: 1921–1971

Selmer Adolf Jackson (May 7, 1888 – March 30, 1971) was an American stage film and television actor. He appeared in nearly 400 films between 1921 and 1963. His name was sometimes spelled Selmar Jackson.

Jackson was born on May 7, 1888, in Lake Mills, Iowa

Jackson gained early acting experience in stock theater, working with groups such as the Des Moines Stock Company. Jackson's screen debut was in the silent film The Supreme Passion (1921). He readily made the transition to sound films.

On March 30, 1971, Jackson died of a heart attack in Burbank, California. He was 82.

== Filmography ==
- The Supreme Passion (1921) – Clara's Beau
- Thru Different Eyes (1929) – King (defense attorney)
- Why Bring That Up? (1929) – Eddie
- Lovin' the Ladies (1930) – George Van Horne
- Brothers (1930) – Assistant Defense Attorney (uncredited)
- Madonna of the Streets (1930) – Kingsley's Partner (uncredited)
- Dirigible (1931) – Lieutenant Rowland (uncredited)
- Subway Express (1931) – Mason
- The Secret Call (1931) – Matt Stanton
- Left Over Ladies (1931) – Churchill
- The Big Timer (1932) – Jim Colton (uncredited)
- Play Girl (1932) – Horserace Announcer (uncredited)
- Shopworn (1932) – Murray, Headwaiter (uncredited)
- The Mouthpiece (1932) – Prison Clerk (uncredited)
- The Strange Love of Molly Louvain (1932) – Detective Charlie (uncredited)
- Winner Take All (1932) – Ring Announcer (uncredited)
- Doctor X (1932) – Willard Keefe, Daily World Night Editor (uncredited)
- Two Against the World (1932) – Radio Commentator (uncredited)
- Big City Blues (1932) – Joe (uncredited)
- Three on a Match (1932) – Radio Announcer (voice, uncredited)
- You Said a Mouthful (1932) – Jones, Attorney (uncredited)
- Luxury Liner (1933) – Older Man (uncredited)
- Forgotten (1933) – Hans Strauss
- The Little Giant (1933) – Radio Announcer (voice, uncredited)
- The Working Man (1933) – Hartland Company Man (uncredited)
- Picture Snatcher (1933) – Joe Chase, Record Editor (uncredited)
- Brief Moment (1933) – Conover (uncredited)
- Police Car 17 (1933) – Police Radio Dispatcher (uncredited)
- After Tonight (1933) – Intelligence Officer (uncredited)
- Blood Money (1933) – Man in District Attorney's Office (uncredited)
- Hell and High Water (1933) – Lieutenant Saunders (uncredited)
- Let's Fall in Love (1933) – Barton (uncredited)
- I've Got Your Number (1934) – Joe, Gangster
- Sisters Under the Skin (1934) – Mullen
- Stand Up and Cheer! (1934) – White House Correspondent (uncredited)
- The Witching Hour (1934) – Henry Walthall (uncredited)
- Sadie McKee (1934) – Tiffany Salesman (uncredited)
- Fog Over Frisco (1934) – Radio Announcer (uncredited)
- The Most Precious Thing in Life (1934) – Game Announcer (uncredited)
- Now I'll Tell (1934) – Decker (uncredited)
- The Defense Rests (1934) – Duffy
- Blind Date (1934) – George E. Martin (uncredited)
- The Richest Girl in the World (1934) – Dr. Harvey (uncredited)
- 6 Day Bike Rider (1934) – Announcer (uncredited)
- I'll Fix It (1934) – Crawley (uncredited)
- Jealousy (1934) – Radio Announcer (uncredited)
- Murder in the Clouds (1934) – Radio Announcer (voice, uncredited)
- Bright Eyes (1934) – Ned's Attorney (uncredited)
- The Secret Bride (1934) – Vincent's Counsel (uncredited)
- The Best Man Wins (1935) – O'Neill (uncredited)
- Red Hot Tires (1935) – Prosecuting Attorney Charles M. Yaghem (uncredited)
- Devil Dogs of the Air (1935) – Medical Officer (uncredited)
- Carnival (1935) – Baby Judge (uncredited)
- The Great Hotel Murder (1935) – Railroad Ticket Agent (uncredited)
- Living on Velvet (1935) – Captain at Flying Field (uncredited)
- Traveling Saleslady (1935) – J.C. Scoville
- $10 Raise (1935) – Real Estate Agent (uncredited)
- Let 'Em Have It (1935) – Bertillion Instructor (uncredited)
- Public Hero No. 1 (1935) – Simpson, Prison Board Member (uncredited)
- In Caliente (1935) – Graphic Artist (uncredited)
- Chinatown Squad (1935) – Detective (uncredited)
- Alibi Ike (1935) – Second Radio Announcer (uncredited)
- Front Page Woman (1935) – Joe Davis
- The Murder Man (1935) – Lieutenant White, Ballistics Expert (uncredited)
- Don't Bet on Blondes (1935) – Gambler Who Bet $30,000 (uncredited)
- Broadway Gondolier (1935) – Program Director (uncredited)
- Page Miss Glory (1935) – Radio Announcer (uncredited)
- Red Salute (1935) – Army Officer #2
- Navy Wife (1935) – Doctor (uncredited)
- She Married Her Boss (1935) – Andrews (uncredited)
- The Public Menace (1935) – Chief Steward (uncredited)
- This Is the Life (1935) – Mr. Walters (uncredited)
- Shipmates Forever (1935) – Commander Gibbs (uncredited)
- Grand Exit (1935) – District Attorney Cope
- A Night at the Opera (1935) – Committeeman (uncredited)
- Paddy O'Day (1936) – Ship's Officer (uncredited)
- Next Time We Love (1936) – Dr. Campbell (uncredited)
- It Had to Happen (1936) – Minor Role (uncredited)
- The Bridge of Sighs (1936) – Defense Attorney Alan Adams
- The Great Ziegfeld (1936) – Barber Shop Customer (uncredited)
- The Singing Kid (1936) – IRS Head J.A. Hanson (uncredited)
- Show Boat (1936) – Hotel Clerk (uncredited)
- Educating Father (1936) – Professor Howard (uncredited)
- The Golden Arrow (1936) – Lorimer (uncredited)
- Revolt of the Zombies (1936) – Officer (uncredited)
- Little Miss Nobody (1936) – Judge Gibson (uncredited)
- Parole! (1936) – Earl Bigbee
- Easy Money (1936) – Mr. Harrison
- Public Enemy's Wife (1936) – Duffield
- The Bride Walks Out (1936) – Mr. Barrows, International Steel (uncredited)
- Charlie Chan at the Race Track (1936) – J.L. Lansing, Racing Secretary (uncredited)
- Postal Inspector (1936) – Chief Postal Inspector (uncredited)
- Sing, Baby, Sing (1936) – City Editor (uncredited)
- My Man Godfrey (1936) – Blake, Socialite (uncredited)
- Libeled Lady (1936) – Adams, Washington Chronicle Editor (uncredited)
- The Magnificent Brute (1936) – Dr. Coleman
- Ace Drummond (1936, Serial) – William Meredith Sr. (uncredited)
- Robinson Crusoe of Clipper Island (1936) – Mr. Canfield
- The Accusing Finger (1936) – Medical Examiner (uncredited)
- Wanted! Jane Turner (1936) – Ferris, Postal Inspector (uncredited)
- Charlie Chan at the Opera (1936) – Hudson, Wire-Photo Technician (uncredited)
- Stowaway (1936) – Randall's Lawyer in Reno (uncredited)
- Three Smart Girls (1936) – Hamilton (uncredited)
- Jungle Jim (1937, Serial) – Attorney Tyler [Ch.1]
- Man of the People (1937) – Governor (uncredited)
- Girl Overboard (1937) – Captain Hartman (uncredited)
- Breezing Home (1937) – Steward (uncredited)
- Two Wise Maids (1937) – Dr. MacIntyre
- A Family Affair (1937) – Hoyt Wells
- Behind the Headlines (1937) – J.H. Scott, FBI (uncredited)
- Charlie Chan at the Olympics (1937) – Navy Commander (uncredited)
- The Man in Blue (1937) – District Attorney
- The Case of the Stuttering Bishop (1937) – Victor Stockton
- The 13th Man (1937) – Andrew Baldwin
- Between Two Women (1937) – Dr. Shanklin (uncredited)
- Meet the Boyfriend (1937) – Madison
- Reported Missing (1937) – C. J. Fleming, FBI (uncredited)
- The Man Who Cried Wolf (1937) – Defense Attorney (uncredited)
- My Dear Miss Aldrich (1937) – Captain (scenes deleted)
- Hot Water (1937) – Maxwell
- The Wrong Road (1937) – Judge
- The Westland Case (1937) – The Warden
- West of Shanghai (1937) – Harry Hemingway (uncredited)
- Federal Bullets (1937) – Harker
- Manhattan Merry-Go-Round (1937) – J. Henry Thorne (uncredited)
- The Duke Comes Back (1937) – Jim Watson
- You're Only Young Once (1937) – Hoyt Wells
- Smashing the Vice Trust (1937) – District Attorney
- Wise Girl (1937) – Lawyer Barton #2 (uncredited)
- Midnight Intruder (1938) – Judge Hammond
- Mad About Music (1938) – Reporter (uncredited)
- Prison Nurse (1938) – Parker
- Arson Gang Busters (1938) – Commissioner Benton
- Alexander's Ragtime Band (1938) – Manager Radio Station
- Crime Ring (1938) – Ernie, Lawyer (uncredited)
- Little Tough Guy (1938) – 3rd Judge (uncredited)
- The Chaser (1938) – Second Judge (uncredited)
- Gateway (1938) – Inspector (uncredited)
- The Missing Guest (1938) – Frank Baldrich
- Personal Secretary (1938) – Blackmere (defense attorney)
- Secrets of an Actress (1938) – Thompson
- Too Hot to Handle (1938) – Coast Guard Captain (uncredited)
- Garden of the Moon (1938) – Doctor (uncredited)
- Down in 'Arkansaw' (1938) – Edwards
- Flight to Fame (1938) – Jules Peabody
- Gangster's Boy (1938) – Judge Roger Davis
- The Law West of Tombstone (1938) – New York Judge (uncredited)
- Secrets of a Nurse (1938) – Assistant District Attorney (uncredited)
- Gambling Ship (1938) – Steve Riley
- Pacific Liner (1939) – San Francisco Port Doctor (uncredited)
- Stand Up and Fight (1939) – Whittingham P. Talbot (scenes deleted)
- Off the Record (1939) – Detective Mendall
- Wings of the Navy (1939) – First Doctor (uncredited)
- Society Lawyer (1939) – District Attorney (uncredited)
- Mr. Moto in Danger Island (1939) – Doctor (uncredited)
- Undercover Agent (1939) – John Graham
- Confessions of a Nazi Spy (1939) – Customs Official (uncredited)
- Union Pacific (1939) – Jerome (uncredited)
- Outside These Walls (1939) – John Wilson
- Sorority House (1939) – Mr. Grant
- Inside Information (1939) – Alfred Huxley
- 6,000 Enemies (1939) – Judge (uncredited)
- Naughty but Nice (1939) – Plaintiff's Attorney (uncredited)
- Five Came Back (1939) – Airline Official (uncredited)
- The Forgotten Woman (1939) – Man (uncredited)
- Each Dawn I Die (1939) – Editor Patterson (uncredited)
- The Under-Pup (1939) – Lawyer (uncredited)
- The Star Maker (1939) – Doctor
- Calling All Marines (1939) – Colonel C.B. Vincent
- Espionage Agent (1939) – Instructor (uncredited)
- The Escape (1939) – Mr. Henley (uncredited)
- Scandal Sheet (1939) – Douglas Haynes
- On Dress Parade (1939) – Captain Evans Dover
- 20,000 Men a Year (1939) – C.A.A. Official (uncredited)
- Blondie Brings Up Baby (1939) – Tom Malcolm (uncredited)
- Missing Evidence (1939) – Manager (uncredited)
- Reno (1939) – Disbarment Lawyer (uncredited)
- Two Thoroughbreds (1939) – Bill Conway
- Private Detective (1939) – Simmy Sanger
- The Honeymoon's Over (1939) – Madden (uncredited)
- South of the Border (1939) – American Consul
- Swanee River (1939) – Army Medical Examiner (uncredited)
- Invisible Stripes (1939) – Police Lieutenant (uncredited)
- The Green Hornet (1940, Serial) – District Attorney [Chs. 4, 10]
- The Man Who Wouldn't Talk (1940) – James Sawyer (uncredited)
- Abe Lincoln in Illinois (1940) – Aide to Stephen Douglas (uncredited)
- The Grapes of Wrath (1940) – Inspection Officer
- The Man from Dakota (1940) – Surgeon (uncredited)
- Honeymoon Deferred (1940) – Frederick Johnson (uncredited)
- Teddy, the Rough Rider (1940, Short) – John W. Riggs, Cabinet Member (uncredited)
- The Marines Fly High (1940) – Medical Officer (uncredited)
- Johnny Apollo (1940) – Warden
- Son of the Navy (1940) – Captain Parker
- Forty Little Mothers (1940) – Missing Persons Detective (uncredited)
- If I Had My Way (1940) – Mr. Melville (uncredited)
- On Their Own (1940)
- Murder in the Air (1940) – Captain Riddell, Naval Hospital Doctor (uncredited)
- Florian (1940) – Desk Sergeant (uncredited)
- Babies for Sale (1940) – Arthur Kingsley
- Wagons Westward (1940) – Major Marlowe
- Queen of the Mob (1940) – Frederick Smith (uncredited)
- Sailor's Lady (1940) – Executive Officer
- Millionaires in Prison (1940) – Dr. Harry Lindsay
- Military Academy (1940) – Mr. Blake (uncredited)
- Brigham Young (1940) – Caleb Kent
- Men Against the Sky (1940) – Captain Sanders
- Hired Wife (1940) – Hudson (uncredited)
- Public Deb No. 1 (1940) – Lawyer (uncredited)
- No Time for Comedy (1940) – First-Nighter (uncredited)
- I'm Still Alive (1940) – Baxter (uncredited)
- City for Conquest (1940) – Doctor
- Glamour for Sale (1940) – Police Chief Thomas (uncredited)
- The Ape (1940) – Dr. McNulty
- Girls Under 21 (1940) – Judge Frank P. Wallace (uncredited)
- Gallant Sons (1940) – Henry, Gambling Man (uncredited)
- Lady with Red Hair (1940) – Henry DeMille
- Santa Fe Trail (1940) – Officer Reading Names of Graduates (uncredited)
- Bowery Boy (1940) – Dr. Crane
- Buck Privates (1941) – Captain Johnson (uncredited)
- Back Street (1941) – Arthur (uncredited)
- Nice Girl? (1941) – General (uncredited)
- Meet John Doe (1941) – Radio Announcer at Convention (uncredited)
- The Man Who Lost Himself (1941) – Mr. Green
- She Knew All the Answers (1941) – Broker
- Love Crazy (1941) – Doctor at Susan's Apartment (uncredited)
- Tight Shoes (1941) – Larry, District Attorney
- Paper Bullets (1941) – District Attorney
- Blossoms in the Dust (1941) – Texas Senator (uncredited)
- Sergeant York (1941) – General Duncan (uncredited)
- The Shepherd of the Hills (1941) – Doctor (uncredited)
- Three Sons o' Guns (1941) – Draft Board Chairman (uncredited)
- Here Comes Mr. Jordan (1941) – Board Member (uncredited)
- International Squadron (1941) – Saunders
- Parachute Battalion (1941) – Thomas Morse
- Dr. Kildare's Wedding Day (1941) – Dr. Whitney (uncredited)
- Navy Blues (1941) – Captain Willard (uncredited)
- It Started with Eve (1941) – Henry, Hotel Guest (uncredited)
- International Lady (1941) – Colonel (uncredited)
- The Devil Pays Off (1941) – Admiral Curtiss (uncredited)
- They Died with Their Boots On (1941) – Captain McCook (uncredited)
- Road to Happiness (1941) – Sam Rankin
- Remember the Day (1941) – Graham
- Dick Tracy vs. Crime, Inc. (1941, Serial) – Army Officer (uncredited)
- A Date with the Falcon (1942) – Mr. Wallis (uncredited)
- The Power of God (1942) – The Pastor
- Dr. Kildare's Victory (1942) – Mr. Jackson (uncredited)
- Frisco Lil (1942) – McIntyre
- Joe Smith, American (1942) – Hospital Doctor (uncredited)
- Sing Your Worries Away (1942) – Producer (uncredited)
- Secret Agent of Japan (1942) – American Naval Captain
- True to the Army (1942) – Congressman
- The Strange Case of Doctor Rx (1942) – Judge (uncredited)
- Saboteur (1942) – FBI Chief (uncredited)
- Romance on the Range (1942) – Harrison (uncredited)
- Meet the Stewarts (1942) – Club Member (uncredited)
- My Favorite Spy (1942) – Minister at Wedding (uncredited)
- The Falcon Takes Over (1942) – Laird Burnett (uncredited)
- Miss Annie Rooney (1942) – Mr. Thomas
- Ten Gentlemen from West Point (1942) – Sersen
- Powder Town (1942) – Mr. Tuttle (uncredited)
- Thru Different Eyes (1942) – Chaplain
- Cairo (1942) – Captain, USS Hiawatha (uncredited)
- The Secret Code (1942, Serial) – Major Henry Barton
- Get Hep to Love (1942) – George Arnold, Insurance Man (uncredited)
- Thunder Birds (1942) – Minor Role
- Madame Spy (1942) – Harrison K. Woods
- When Johnny Comes Marching Home (1942) – Major Donaldson (uncredited)
- Margin for Error (1943) – Coroner (uncredited)
- You Can't Beat the Law (1943) – Mr. Bedford
- It Ain't Hay (1943) – Grant
- Harrigan's Kid (1943) – Mr. Ranley
- The Falcon in Danger (1943) – Airport Official (uncredited)
- Honeymoon Lodge (1943) – Carol's Lawyer (uncredited)
- Someone to Remember (1943) – Mr. Freeman (uncredited)
- Adventures of the Flying Cadets (1943, Serial) – Professor Mason [Chs. 11–13]
- Guadalcanal Diary (1943) – Colonel Thompson (uncredited)
- Around the World (1943) – Consul (uncredited)
- What a Woman! (1943) – Bruce (uncredited)
- The Fighting Sullivans (1944) – Damage Control Officer (uncredited)
- Hey, Rookie (1944) – Colonel Robbins
- Stars on Parade (1944) – J. L. Carson
- A Night of Adventure (1944) – Washington D.C. Official (uncredited)
- Roger Touhy, Gangster (1944) – Principal Keeper (uncredited)
- Marine Raiders (1944) – Colonel at Guadalcanal (uncredited)
- Wing and a Prayer (1944) – Admiral (uncredited)
- The Big Noise (1944) – Mr. Manning of the Patent Office (uncredited)
- Heavenly Days (1944) – Sunday Editor (uncredited)
- She's a Sweetheart (1944) – General
- Destiny (1944) – Warden (uncredited)
- Sheriff of Las Vegas (1944) – Arthur Stanton
- Forever Yours (1945) – Williams
- Dillinger (1945) – Dr. Rex Spang (uncredited)
- Circumstantial Evidence (1945) – Warden
- Escape in the Desert (1945) – FBI Chief (uncredited)
- Thrill of a Romance (1945) – 2nd Hotel Monte Belva Clerk (uncredited)
- A Sporting Chance (1945) – John Smalley
- Out of This World (1945) – Doctor (uncredited)
- The Caribbean Mystery (1945) – Dr. Herbert Merryman (uncredited)
- First Yank Into Tokyo (1945) – Colonel Blaine (uncredited)
- The Royal Mounted Rides Again (1945, Serial) – RCMP Superintendent MacDonald
- This Love of Ours (1945) – Dr. Melnik
- Dakota (1945) – Dr. Judson
- Allotment Wives (1945) – Deacon Sam
- Black Market Babies (1945) – Mr. Henry Andrews
- Shock (1946) – Dr. Blair (uncredited)
- Girl on the Spot (1946) – Ridgeway (uncredited)
- Johnny Comes Flying Home (1946) – Dr. Gunderson (uncredited)
- Mysterious Intruder (1946) – Dr. Connell (uncredited)
- The Glass Alibi (1946) – Dr. John F. Lawson
- The French Key (1946) – Walter Winslow
- She Wrote the Book (1946) – Fielding
- The Time of Their Lives (1946) – Mr. Dibbs, Museum Curator (uncredited)
- Dangerous Money (1946) – Ship's Doctor
- Child of Divorce (1946) – Dr. Sterling
- Wife Wanted (1946) – Lowell Cornell (uncredited)
- Boston Blackie and the Law (1946) – Warden Lund (uncredited)
- San Quentin (1946) – Reverend Eckles (uncredited)
- The Thirteenth Hour (1947) – Judge Collins (uncredited)
- The Beginning or the End (1947) – Senior Engineer (uncredited)
- A Likely Story (1947) – Doctor in Elevator (uncredited)
- Sarge Goes to College (1947) – Marine Captain R.S. Handler
- Stepchild (1947) – Judge
- The Pretender (1947) – Charles Lennox
- Magic Town (1947) – Stringer
- Key Witness (1947) – Edward Clemmons
- Bury Me Dead (1947) – Reverend Dr. Foster (uncredited)
- Cass Timberlane (1947) – Dr. Leskett (uncredited)
- The Fabulous Texan (1947) – Flanigan (uncredited)
- Her Husband's Affairs (1947) – Judge (uncredited)
- Heading for Heaven (1947) – Doctor
- High Wall (1947) – Police Inspector Harding (uncredited)
- The Cobra Strikes (1948) – Dr. Keating
- King of the Gamblers (1948) – Judge
- The Fuller Brush Man (1948) – Henry Seward (uncredited)
- Stage Struck (1948) – Mr. Howard
- Dream Girl (1948) – Judge 'Jed' Allerton (uncredited)
- Blonde Ice (1948) – District Attorney Ed Chalmers
- Pitfall (1948) – Ed Brawley
- The Gentleman from Nowhere (1948) – District Attorney (uncredited)
- The Girl from Manhattan (1948) – Dr. Moseby
- Sealed Verdict (1948) – Dr. Bossin, US Army
- The Dark Past (1948) – Warden Benson (uncredited)
- Every Girl Should Be Married (1948) – Clergyman (uncredited)
- Alaska Patrol (1949) – Captain Wright
- The Crime Doctor's Diary (1949) – Warden (uncredited)
- Tulsa (1949) – Oilman (uncredited)
- Sorrowful Jones (1949) – Doctor (uncredited)
- The Fountainhead (1949) – Cortlandt Official (uncredited)
- Forgotten Women (1949) – Judge Donnell
- Mighty Joe Young (1949) – Judge (uncredited)
- Renegades of the Sage (1949) – Brown
- Mark of the Gorilla (1950) – Warden Frank R. Bentley
- Gunmen of Abilene (1950) – Dr. Johnson
- No Man of Her Own (1950) – Minister (uncredited)
- Lucky Losers (1950) – David J. Thurstinn
- Pygmy Island (1950) – Army Officer at Pentagon (uncredited)
- The Magnificent Yankee (1950) – Mr. Amboy (uncredited)
- The Flying Missile (1950) – Colonel Halliburton (uncredited)
- Bowery Battalion (1951) – Colonel Masters
- Up Front (1951) – General (uncredited)
- Buckaroo Sheriff of Texas (1951) – Governor
- That's My Boy (1951) – Doc Hunter
- Purple Heart Diary (1951) – Colonel Tappen
- Elopement (1951) – Dr. Halsey (uncredited)
- Captain Video (1951, Serial) – J.R. Wade, Deputy Commissioner of Public Safety (uncredited)
- Indian Uprising (1952) – Commissioner of Indian Affairs (uncredited)
- Deadline - U.S.A. (1952) – Williams (uncredited)
- Young Man with Ideas (1952) – Merritt Crayton, Attorney (uncredited)
- Montana Territory (1952) – Banker (uncredited)
- Washington Story (1952) – Party Guest Greeting Ambassador (uncredited)
- We're Not Married! (1952) – Chaplain Hall (uncredited)
- Sudden Fear (1952) – Dr. Van Roan (uncredited)
- Ruby Gentry (1952) – Club Member at Bar (uncredited)
- Jack McCall, Desperado (1953) – Colonel Brand
- Rebel City (1953) – Colonel Barnes (uncredited)
- The President's Lady (1953) – Colonel Green (uncredited)
- Sky Commando (1953) – General Carson
- Crazylegs (1953) – President of Michigan Alumni Association (uncredited)
- The Adventures of Superman (1953) - Martin
- Demetrius and the Gladiators (1954) – Senator (uncredited)
- Seven Angry Men (1955) – Ralph Waldo Emerson (uncredited)
- The Eternal Sea (1955) – V.I.P. (uncredited)
- Devil Goddess (1955) – Professor Carl Blakely
- Autumn Leaves (1956) – Mr. Wetherby
- Three Brave Men (1956) – Retired Admiral (uncredited)
- Hellcats of the Navy (1957) – Fleet Admiral Chester W. Nimitz (uncredited)
- Alfred Hitchcock Presents (1958) (Season 3 Episode 24: "The Foghorn") - Butler
- The Lost Missile (1958) – Secretary of State
- Alfred Hitchcock Presents (1959) (Season 4 Episode 20: "The Diamond Necklace") - Henry
- Alfred Hitchcock Presents (1959) (Season 4 Episode 34: "A True Account") - Reverend
- The Atomic Submarine (1959) – Admiral Terhune
- Alfred Hitchcock Presents (1960) (Season 5 Episode 18: "Backward, Turn Backward") - Minister
- The Gallant Hours (1960) – Admiral Chester W. Nimitz (uncredited)
- Alfred Hitchcock Presents (1961) (Season 6 Episode 32: "Self Defense") - Clergyman
- The Alfred Hitchcock Hour (1963) (Season 2 Episode 7: "Starring the Defense") - Movie Chaplain
- The Wheeler Dealers (1963) – Businessman (uncredited)
