= The Man Who Walked Alone =

1945 film by Christy Cabanne

- Directed by: Christy Cabanne
- Written by: Robert Lee Johnson
- Story by: Christy Cabanne
- Produced by: Christy Cabanne (associate producer)
- Starring: David O'Brien; Kay Aldridge; Walter Catlett; Guinn (Big Boy) Williams
- Cinematography: James Brown, A.S.C.
- Edited by: W. Donn Hayes
- Music by: Karl Hajos
- Distributed by: PRC Pictures, Inc.
- Release date: March 15, 1945 (United States)
- Running time: 71 minutes
- Country: United States
- Language: English

The Man Who Walked Alone is a 1945 American B film romantic comedy film produced by PRC Pictures, Inc., directed by Christy Cabanne, with top-billed Dave O'Brien and Kay Aldridge, along with Walter Catlett and Guinn (Big Boy) Williams.

Karl Hajos was nominated for the Academy Award for Best Original Score.

== Plot ==
During the final months of World War II, a young man is hitchhiking to the small town of Plainfield. After several failed attempts, he finally steps in front of a car driven by a young woman. She tries to go around him, but crashes and blows out a tire. He changes the tire in exchange for a ride from the hostile woman. In addition to blaming him for causing her accident, she resents that he has somehow avoided military service, but when he goes to get some gas, she discovers a uniform (with many decorations) in his suitcase and becomes friendlier to him. They reveal their odd names, but nothing else about themselves: he is Marion and she is "Willie". He is sure that she is a spoiled rich girl, and in fact Wilhelmina "Willie" Hammond is indeed a member of a wealthy high-society family, running from an arranged marriage to another socially prominent type, stolid Alvin Bailey.

Acting on the reported theft of Bailey's car, the police stop the pair and put them in jail. After the police talk to Bailey on the telephone, the two are released. Willie takes Marion to the family mansion, telling him that she is the family's secretary. Having lost her key, she has him crawl through a window, causing the pair to be taken into custody again. Her identity is finally established, but reporters at the police station get a hold of the story. The pair are again released.

Willie initially thinks that Marion is an Army deserter, but after he explains he received a medical discharge, she gives him a job as the family chauffeur, though Wiggins, the eccentric old caretaker of the estate, has misgivings.

Willie's widowed mother, Mrs. Hammond, "old maid" Aunt Harriet, and younger sister Patricia all return from New York City, along with Alvin Bailey and his physical trainer and sidekick, Champ. Mrs. Hammond and Bailey strongly disapprove of Willie's association with a presumed gold digger. Mrs. Hammond tries to buy Marion off, while Bailey sends Champ to get the police. Marion, however, is determined to win Willie's heart.

After a series of family arguments and complications, Marion is revealed to be a nationally known war hero. He was hitchhiking simply because he does not like publicity. He is warmly welcomed by the mayor and the governor, and honored with a parade by Plainfield. His killed-in-battle friend described his hometown so vividly to Marion and later bequeathed it to him, so, having no real ties to any other place, he decided to settle there. As Marion is being driven away, Willie sets out after him in her wedding dress, and in a role reversal, he gives her a ride.

== Cast ==
- Dave O'Brien as Pvt. Marion Scott
- Kay Aldridge as Wilhelmina Hammond
- Walter Catlett as Wiggins
- Guinn (Big Boy) Williams as Champ
- Isabel Randolph as Mrs. Hammond
- Smith Ballew as Alvin Bailey
- Nancy June Robinson as Patricia Hammond
- Ruth Lee as Aunt Harriet
- Chester Clute as Mr. Monroe
- Vivien Oakland as Mrs. Monroe
- Vicki Saunders as Camille
- Robert Hartzell as Joe
- Charles Williams as Moe
- Tom Dugan as 2nd Desk Sergeant
- William B. Davidson as Governor
- Dick Elliott as Mayor
- Jack Raymond as Taxi Driver
- Jack Mulhall as 1st Cop

The lead character, Marion Scott, is shown in ending credits as a private, but he is referred to repeatedly in the final scenes as Corporal Scott and has the two stripes of that rank on his uniform sleeve.
