= New Trenton, Indiana =

- Census-designated place
- Location of New Trenton in Franklin County, Indiana.

- Location within Indiana
- Coordinates: 39°18′32″N 84°53′49″W
- Country: United States
- State: Indiana
- County: Franklin
- Township: Whitewater

Area
  - Total: 0.44 sq mi (1.14 km^{2})
  - Land: 0.44 sq mi (1.14 km^{2})
  - Water: 0 sq mi (0.00 km^{2})
- Elevation: 755 ft (230 m)

Population (2020)
  - Total: 269
  - Density: 609.6/sq mi (235.38/km^{2})
- ZIP code: 47035
- FIPS code: 18-53712
- GNIS feature ID: 2587023

New Trenton is an unincorporated community and census-designated place (CDP) in Whitewater Township, Franklin County, Indiana. As of the 2020 census, New Trenton had a population of 269. It has a ZIP code 47035.

== History ==
New Trenton was laid out in 1816. The community was named after Trenton, New Jersey, the native home of a share of the first settlers. The New Trenton post office was established in 1817.

== Geography ==
New Trenton is located in southeastern Franklin County in the valley of the Whitewater River, a southeasterly-flowing tributary of the Great Miami River. U.S. Route 52 passes through the community, leading northwest (upriver) 11 miles (18 km) to Brookville and southeast (downriver) 6.5 miles (10.5 km) to Harrison, Ohio.

According to the U.S. Census Bureau, the New Trenton CDP has an area of 0.44 square miles (1.14 km^{2}), all land.

== Demographics ==
Historical population
Census	Pop.	Note	%±
2020	269		—
U.S. Decennial Census

== Notable people ==
- John Calvert, magician born in New Trenton
