= Phillip Reed =

American actor (1908–1996)

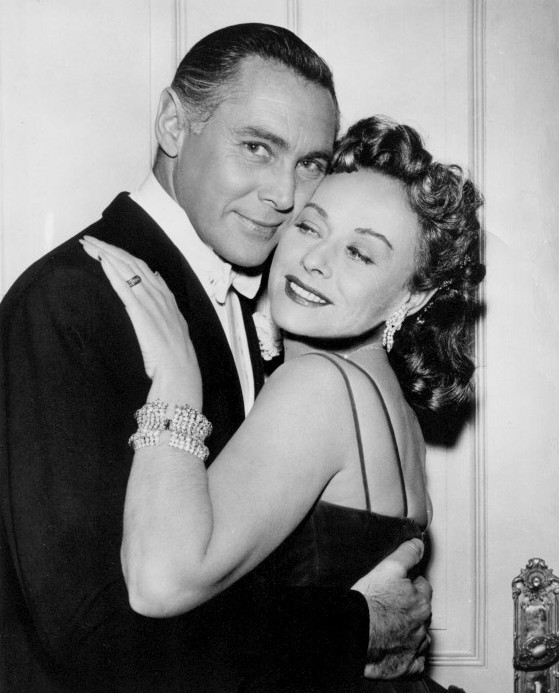
- Reed with Paulette Goddard from The Joseph Cotten Show, 1957
- Born: Milton LeRoy Treinis; March 25, 1908; New York City, U.S.
- Died: December 7, 1996 (aged 88); Los Angeles, California, U.S.
- Years active: 1932–1965
- Spouse: Audrey Reed (?–1996; his death)

Phillip Reed (born Milton LeRoy Treinis; March 25, 1908 – December 7, 1996) was an American actor. He played Steve Wilson in a series of four films (1947–1948) based on the Big Town radio series.

== Early years ==
Reed was a star athlete at Erasmus Hall High School in Brooklyn and attended college for one year before going into acting. His name was changed after he went to Hollywood.

== Acting career ==
Reed appeared in two Broadway plays: Melody and Ballyhoo of 1932, billed as Milton Leroy. Reed was also often credited as Philip Reed, such as in his appearances in the television series Alfred Hitchcock Presents.

Reed played Russ Barrington in the soap opera Society Girl on CBS radio and Brian Wells in the soap opera David Harum, also on CBS.

Reed's television appearances include a lead role in the 1955 anthology drama series Police Call. He appeared in the Alfred Hitchcock Presents episodes "The Derelicts,” "A Bullet for Baldwin," “Sylvia,” and "The Big Score." He also appeared as King Toranshah in the 1965 Elvis Presley musical film Harum Scarum.

== Death ==
Reed died in 1996 and was buried at Forest Lawn Memorial Park Cemetery in Glendale, California.

== Complete filmography ==
- College Coach (1933) - 'Wes' Westerman
- Female (1933) - Freddie Claybourne
- The House on 56th Street (1933) - Freddy
- Fashions of 1934 (1934) - Jimmy
- Gambling Lady (1934) - Steve
- Jimmy the Gent (1934) - Ronny Gatson
- Journal of a Crime (1934) - Young Man at Party
- Registered Nurse (1934) - Bill
- Glamour (1934) - Lorenzo Valenti
- Affairs of a Gentleman (1934) - Carter Vaughn
- Dr. Monica (1934) - 'Bunny' Burton
- British Agent (1934) - Gaston LeFarge
- A Lost Lady (1934) - Ned
- Big Hearted Herbert (1934) - Andrew Goodrich
- Maybe It's Love (1935) - Adolph Jr.
- The Woman in Red (1935) - Dan McCall
- Sweet Music (1935) - Grant
- Gypsy Sweetheart (1935, Short) - Tom Van Dyke
- The Case of the Curious Bride (1935) - Dr. Millbeck
- The Girl from 10th Avenue (1935) - Tony Hewlett
- Accent on Youth (1935) - Dickie Reynolds
- The Murder of Dr. Harrigan (1936) - Dr. Simon
- Klondike Annie (1936) - Inspector Jack Forrest
- The Last of the Mohicans (1936) - Uncas
- The Luckiest Girl in the World (1936) - Percy Mayhew
- Madame X (1937) - Jean
- Merrily We Live (1938) - Herbert Wheeler
- My Irish Molly (1938) - Bob
- Aloma of the South Seas (1941) - Revo
- Week-End for Three (1941) - Randy Bloodworth
- A Gentleman After Dark (1942) - Eddie Smith
- Old Acquaintance (1943) - Lucian Grant
- People Are Funny (1946) - John Guedel
- Hot Cargo (1946) - Chris Bigelow
- Rendezvous with Annie (1946) - Lieutenant Avery
- Big Town (1946) - Steve Wilson
- Her Sister's Secret (1946) - Richard 'Dick' Connolly
- Song of Scheherazade (1947) - Prince Mischetsky
- I Cover Big Town (1947) - Steve Wilson
- Song of the Thin Man (1947) - Tommy Edlon Drake
- Pirates of Monterey (1947) - Lieutenant Carlos Ortega
- Big Town After Dark (1947) - Steve Wilson
- Big Town Scandal (1948) - Steve Wilson
- Bodyguard (1948) - Freddie Dysen
- Unknown Island (1948) - Ted Osborne
- Daughter of the West (1949) - Navo White Eagle
- Manhandled (1949) - Guy Bayard
- Davy Crockett, Indian Scout (1950) - Red Hawk
- Tripoli (1950) - Hamet Karamanly
- The Bandit Queen (1950) - Joaquin Murietta
- Thief in Silk (1953)
- Jeunes mariés (1953)
- Take Me to Town (1953) - Newton Cole
- The Girl in the Red Velvet Swing (1955) - Robert Collier
- Alfred Hitchcock Presents (1956) (Season 1 Episode 14: "A Bullet for Baldwin") - Walter King
- Alfred Hitchcock Presents (1956) (Season 1 Episode 19: "The Derelicts") - Ralph Cowell
- The Tattered Dress (1957) - Michael Reston
- Alfred Hitchcock Presents (1958) (Season 3 Episode 16: "Sylvia") - Peter Kent
- Alfred Hitchcock Presents (1962) (Season 7 Episode 22: "The Big Score") - Mr. F. Hubert Fellowes
- The Alfred Hitchcock Hour (1962) (Season 1 Episode 14: "The Tender Poisoner") - John O'Brien
- Harum Scarum (1965) - King Toranshah (final film role)
