= James Griffith =

American actor, musician and screenwriter (1916–1993)

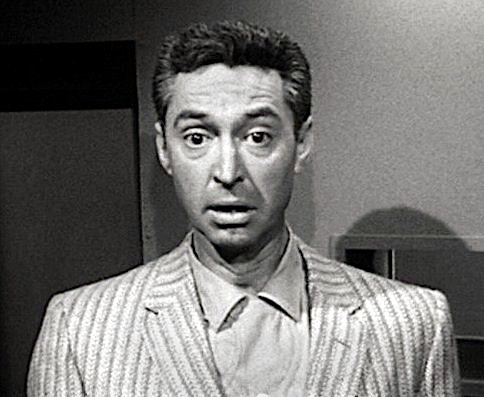
- James Griffith in The Amazing Transparent Man (1960)
- Born: February 13, 1916; Los Angeles, California, U.S
- Died: September 17, 1993 (aged 77); Avila Beach, California, U.S.
- Occupations: Actor; musician; screenwriter
- Years active: 1948–1982

James Jeffrey Griffith (February 13, 1916 – September 17, 1993) was an American character actor, musician and screenwriter.

== Early life and career ==
Born in Los Angeles, California and raised in San Pedro, Griffith was the elder of two born to Albert James Griffith and Ruth Elizabeth Jeffrey. They later moved to Balboa, where he attended Newport Beach Grammar School. Following his parents' divorce in 1931, Griffith lived in Santa Monica with his mother, sister and grandmother, attending Huntington Beach High School and, later, Santa Monica High School, where he befriended a young Glenn Ford. Although his extracurricular activity at Santa Monica High appears to have been primarily musical (he played clarinet), Griffith's devotion to the theater outside of school hours, as reported by the San Luis Obispo Tribune, mirrored that of Ford.

During that time he and his boyhood friend, Gwyllyn Ford, went around town trying out for all the plays. On occasion they spread their territory beyond Santa Monica and would hitchhike over to Pasadena and audition at the Pasadena Playhouse. By the time he was 17, Mr. Griffith had acted in 70 plays and graduated from high school.

After graduating from University of California, Los Angeles, he managed to find work in little theatres around Los Angeles, where the budding musician eased into a dual career of acting. He found success in the production They Can't Get You Down in 1939, but put his career on hold during World War II to serve with the United States Marine Corps. Following the war, Griffith switched from the stage to films when he appeared in the 1948 film noir picture Blonde Ice. From then on, he enjoyed a lengthy career of supporting and bit roles (sometimes uncredited) in westerns and detective films.

Though Griffith was generally cast as the outlaw in Western pictures, he managed to garner a few memorable "good guy" roles over his many years in Hollywood – Abraham Lincoln in both 1950's Stage to Tucson and 1955's Apache Ambush (as well as episodes of Cavalcade of America and—as a Lincoln lookalike—The Lone Ranger), Doc Holliday in 1954's Masterson of Kansas, sheriff Pat Garrett in 1954's The Law vs. Billy the Kid, and Davy Crockett in 1956's The First Texan. In 1951's Apache Drums, Griffith portrayed a cavalry officer sensitive to Native-American concerns, and in 1957, he co-starred on Gunsmoke, playing a simple farmer involved in a feud in S3E16's "Twelfth Night". He was also featured in the season one episode, "Pike's Reward," and several others.

In 1959, Griffith appeared as John Wesley Hardin on the TV western Maverick in the episode titled "Duel at Sundown" featuring James Garner and Clint Eastwood.

In the role of Aaron Adams, the town barber, Griffith appeared in 1958 in twelve episodes of the CBS western series, Trackdown.

Griffith also portrayed deputy Tom Ferguson in the syndicated series, The Sheriff of Cochise, starring John Bromfield, and U.S. Marshal.

Griffith made more than seventy guest appearances on television shows, including eight episodes of Wagon Train, seven episodes of The Range Rider, seven episodes of The Lone Ranger, two episodes of Annie Oakley, four episodes of Cheyenne, three episodes of Buffalo Bill, Jr., six episodes of Gunsmoke, four episodes of Perry Mason, four episodes of Dragnet, three episodes (42, 43 and 108) of Batman, and two segments of Little House on the Prairie.

Throughout his acting career, beginning with an early stint as vocalist/reed man with Spike Jones, Griffith frequently found ways to combine his two passions. Collaborating with former Pied Piper Hal Hopper, he co-wrote title tunes for several films. He composed music for the 1958 film Bullwhip and the 1964 picture, Lorna, in which he also had a role and served as screenwriter. Griffith played the Reverend in Black in the opening, closing, and a few in the middle scenes of Lorna, starring Lorna Maitland in one of director Russ Meyer's black-and-white 'skin' movies before the height of Meyer's career in 1968 with Beyond the Valley of the Dolls.

Griffith made his last onscreen appearance in a 1984 episode of CBS's Trapper John, M.D..

== Personal life and death ==
Griffith was married twice: to Margaret Ellen Fluke from 1943 until her death in 1975, and, from 1984 until his own death, to Elizabeth Thorpe (née Jackson). He had one child, a daughter, by his first marriage. In the 60's he lived in a house on Huston St. in Sherman Oaks, California.

On September 17, 1993, Griffith died of cancer in Avila Beach, California, survived by his wife, daughter and two granddaughters.

== Filmography ==
Film
Year	Title	Role	Notes
1948	Blonde Ice	Al Herrick	
1948	Appointment with Murder	Detective	Uncredited
1948	Every Girl Should Be Married	Insurance salesman	Uncredited
1949	Life of St. Paul Series	Tertullus	
1949	Alaska Patrol	Operative Dale	
1949	Daughter of the West	Jed Morgan	
1949	Search for Danger	Lt. Cooper	
1949	Special Agent	Candy Vendor on Train	Uncredited
1949	Fighting Man of the Plains	Quantrell	
1949	Oh, You Beautiful Doll	Joe - Reporter	Uncredited
1949	Holiday Affair	Crowley's Floorwalker	Uncredited
1950	Young Man with a Horn	Walt	Uncredited
1950	Bright Leaf	Ellery	Uncredited
1950	The Cariboo Trail	Higgins	
1950	The Petty Girl	Royal Roof Orchestra Leader	Uncredited
1950	Indian Territory	Apache Kid aka Johnny Corday	
1950	The Breaking Point	Charlie, Bartender	Uncredited
1950	Stage to Tucson	Abraham Lincoln	Voice, Uncredited
1950	Double Deal	Walter Karnes	
1951	Al Jennings of Oklahoma	Slim Harris	
1951	The Great Missouri Raid	Jack Ladd	
1951	Payment on Demand	Arthur	Uncredited
1951	Apache Drums	Lt. Glidden	
1951	Inside the Walls of Folsom Prison	Carl Gebhardt	Uncredited
1951	Goodbye, My Fancy	Somers	(scenes deleted)
1951	As Young as You Feel	Cashier	Uncredited
1951	Chain of Circumstance	Sid	
1951	Rhubarb	Ogelthorpe 'Oggie' Meadows	
1951	Drums in the Deep South	Union Officer Reporting to Denning	Uncredited
1951	The Lady Pays Off	Ronald	
1951	The Blue Veil	Joplin's Agent	Uncredited
1952	Red Skies of Montana	Boise Peterson	Alternative title: Smoke Jumpers
1952	Wait till the Sun Shines, Nellie	Ollie	Uncredited
1952	Ma and Pa Kettle at the Fair	Medicine Man	Uncredited
1952	Eight Iron Men	Pvt. Ferguson	
1953	Kansas Pacific	Joe Farley, Railroad guard	
1953	Powder River	Mac - Hotel Clerk	Uncredited
1953	The Kid from Left Field	Newsstand Proprietor	
1953	No Escape	Peter Hayden	
1953	A Lion Is in the Streets	Mayor's Clerk	Uncredited
1954	Ride Clear of Diablo	Henry - Train Conductor	Uncredited
1954	The Boy from Oklahoma	Joe Downey, Alderman	
1954	Jesse James vs. the Daltons	Bob Dalton	
1954	Rails Into Laramie	Marshal Orrie Sommers	
1954	The Law vs. Billy the Kid	Pat Garrett, Sheriff	
1954	Dragnet	Jesse Quinn	
1954	The Shanghai Story	Carl Hoyt	
1954	The Black Dakotas	Warren	
1954	Drum Beat	Veteran One-Legged Soldier at White House gate	Uncredited
1954	Masterson of Kansas	Doc Holliday	
1954	Day of Triumph	Judas Iscariot	
1954	Manhunt in Space	Ken	
1955	I Cover the Underworld	Smiley Di Angelo	
1955	Son of Sinbad	Arab Guide	Uncredited
1955	The Kentuckian	Riverboat Gambler	Uncredited
1955	The Night of the Hunter	District Attorney	Uncredited
1955	Apache Ambush	President Abraham Lincoln	
1955	Count Three and Pray	Swallow	Alternative title: The Calico Pony
1955	At Gunpoint	The Stranger (Bob Alexander)	
1956	Tribute to a Bad Man	Barjak	
1956	Anything Goes	Paul Holiday	
1956	The Killing	Mr. Grimes	
1956	The First Texan	Davy Crockett	
1956	Rebel in Town	Marshal Adam Russell	
1957	The Guns of Fort Petticoat	Kipper	
1957	The Vampire	Henry Winston	
1957	Wagon Train	Choate	S1E2, The Jean Lebec Story
1957	Omar Khayyam	Buzorg	
1957	Domino Kid	Sam Beal	Uncredited
1957	Raintree County	Mr. Gray's searching companion	Uncredited
1958	Return to Warbow	Frank Hollister	
1958	Man from God's Country	Mark Faber	
1958	Seven Guns to Mesa	Papa Clellan	
1958	Bullwhip	'Slow' Karp	
1958	Frontier Gun	Cash Skelton	
1959	The Big Fisherman	Beggar	
1960	The Amazing Transparent Man	Maj. Paul Krenner	
1960	Spartacus	Otho	Uncredited
1960	North to Alaska	Salvation Army Leader	Uncredited
1961	Morgan keibu to nazô no otoko		
1961	Pocketful of Miracles	Briscoe	Uncredited
1962	How the West Was Won	Poker player with Cleve	Uncredited
1964	Advance to the Rear	Hugo Zattig	Alternative title: Company of Cowards?
1964	Lorna	The Man of God	
1966	A Big Hand for the Little Lady	Mr. Stribling	
1968	Day of the Evil Gun	Storekeeper – Hazenville	
1969	Heaven with a Gun	Abraham Murdock (sheepherder)	
1969	Seven in Darkness	Harlan Cabot	TV movie
1969	Hail, Hero!	Painter #2	
1970	Like It Is	Father	
1974	Seven Alone	Billy Shaw	
1976	Flood!	Charlie Davis	TV movie
1977	Speedtrap	Wino	
1980	The Legend of Sleepy Hollow	Squire Van Tassel	TV movie
Television
Year	Title	Role	Notes
1952	Hopalong Cassidy	Roscoe Hicks	1 episode
1953	Cavalcade of America	Abraham Lincoln	1 episode
1953	Death Valley Days	Solomon Murtrey	1 episode
1954	City Detective	Harry	1 episode
1954	Schlitz Playhouse of Stars	Raymond Andrews	1 episode
1955	Buffalo Bill, Jr.	Kelso Dodge	3 episodes
1955–1968	Gunsmoke	Joe Kite / Joth Monger / Tillman / Bettis / Harford / Wade Lester	6 episodes
1957	The Gray Ghost	Buddy	1 episode
1957	The Adventures of Jim Bowie	Jud Cameron	1 episode
1957–1962	Cheyenne	Assorted roles	4 episodes
1957	Cheyenne	Joe Epic	Episode: "Land Beyond the Law"
1958	Frontier Justice	Taggert	1 episode
1958	Jefferson Drum	Troy Bendick	Episode: "Return"
1958	Official Detective	Det Fred Ball	Episode: "Body In The Trunk"
1958	The Walter Winchell File	Don Gue Watson	Episode: "A Thing of Beauty"
1959–1962	Laramie	Assorted roles	3 episodes
1959	Rescue 8	Ramases	1 episode
1959	Wichita Town	Vic Parker	1 episode
1959	U.S. Marshal	Deputy Tom Ferguson	series regular 1959–1960
1959	Maverick	John Wesley Hardin	Episode: "Duel at Sundown"
1959	Steve Canyon	Bean N. Zook	Episode: "The Muller Story"
1960	Rawhide	Maury	Episode: Incident of the Devil and His Due
1961	The Tall Man	Clint Latimer	"A Kind of Courage"
1961	Two Faces West	Les Hardy	1 episode
1961	The Lawless Years	Jonathan Willis	1 episode
1961	Perry Mason	Walter Hutchings	"The Case of the Posthumous Painter"
1961	Thriller	Victor Harrod	"Parasite Mansion"
1961	Rawhide	Tyree	S3:E22, "Incident in the Middle of Nowhere"
1962	Empire	Pete Stroud	"A Place to Put a Life"
1962	Tales of Wells Fargo	Roland Jensen	1 episode
1962	The Tall Man	James Cutter	"Trial by Fury"
1962	Have Gun Will Travel	Marauder	"The Predators" episode.
1962	Have Gun, Will Travel	Dave Wilder, prisoner	(Episode: The Waiting Room)
1962	Lawman	Heracles Snead	1 episode
1963	GE True	"The Moonshiners"	Stan Woolman
1963	Ben Casey	John Randall	"Suffer the Little Children"
1963	The Untouchables	Monk Lyselle	1 episode
1964	The Great Adventure	Harry Young	1 episode
1964	Slattery's People	Emmett Logan	"Question, Is Laura the Name of the Game?"
1964	The Travels of Jaimie McPheeters	Gambler, Bagsley, and Snake	"The Day of the Toll Takers", "The Day of the Picnic", and "The Day of the Pretenders", respectively
1965	The Rouges	Bert	1 episode
1965	Daniel Boone	Coll	S2/E2 "The Tortoise and the Hare" (1965)
1965	Laredo	Deke Pryor	1 episode
1966	F Troop	Sergeant Crawford	1 episode
1966	The Monroes	Henri "Fox" Bonnard	1 episode
1966	Batman	Trusty	2 episodes (43 and 44)
1967	Batman	Manx	1 episode (108)
1967	Iron Horse	Howley	1 episode
1967	The Monkees	Marshall	S2:E13, "Monkees in Texas"
1969	The Guns of Will Sonnett	Major Cross	1 episode
1969	The Mod Squad	Bubba Johnson	1 episode
1971	The Bold Ones: The Senator	Channing	1 episode
1972	Kung Fu	Purdy	1 episode
1974	Kolchak: The Night Stalker	George M. Schwartz	1 episode
1975	The Six Million Dollar Man	Will Long	1 episode
1975	Barbary Coast	Eikel	1 episode
1976	The Quest	Donkin	1 episode
1977	Police Story	Travis Caulder	1 episode
1978	Fantasy Island	Hezekiah Pugh	1 episode
1979	B. J. and the Bear	Uncle Moss	2 episodes
1981	Hart to Hart	Prospector	1 episode
1982	Dallas		1 episode
