= Jack Bernhard =

American film director

- Born: November 28, 1914; Philadelphia, Pennsylvania; United States
- Died: March 30, 1997 (aged 82); Beverly Hills, California
- Occupation: Film Director
- Years active: 1946–1950

Jack Bernhard (November 28, 1914 – March 30, 1997) was an American film and television director. His films include Decoy (1946), Blonde Ice (1948), Unknown Island (1948) and The Second Face (1950).

== Personal life ==
Bernhard was married to the British actress Jean Gillie, whom he met while serving in Britain during World War II. She appeared in his debut film Decoy. They divorced in 1947, and Gillie died in 1949. He married actress Vicki Lester in 1947; they remained married until his death in 1997.

== Selected filmography ==
=== Director ===
- Decoy (1946)
- Sweetheart of Sigma Chi (1946)
- Violence (1947)
- Perilous Waters (1948)
- The Hunted (1948)
- Blonde Ice (1948)
- Unknown Island (1948)
- Appointment with Murder (1948)
- Alaska Patrol (1949)
- Search for Danger (1949)
- The Second Face (1950)

== Bibliography ==
- Mayer, Geoff & McDonnell, Brian. Encyclopedia of Film Noir. ABC-CLIO, 2007. ISBN 9780313333064.
