= Daughter of the West =

1949 film

- Directed by: Harold Daniels
- Written by: Robert E. Callahan; Irwin Franklyn; Raymond L. Schrock; Jack Daley; James Griffith
- Produced by: Robert E. Callahan; Martin Mooney
- Starring: Martha Vickers; Phillip Reed; Donald Woods
- Cinematography: Henry Sharp
- Edited by: W.L. Bagier
- Music by: Irving Gertz
- Production company: Martin Mooney Productions
- Distributed by: Film Classics
- Release date: February 15, 1949
- Running time: 77 minutes
- Country: United States
- Language: English

Daughter of the West is a 1949 American Western film directed by Harold Daniels and starring Martha Vickers, Phillip Reed and Donald Woods.

The film's sets were designed by the art director George Van Marter.

== Cast ==
- Martha Vickers as Lolita Moreno
- Phillip Reed as Navo White Eagle
- Donald Woods as Commissioner Ralph C. Connors
- Marion Carney as Okeeman (Atoka)
- Pedro de Cordoba as Chief Wykomas
- James Griffith as Jed Morgan
- William Farnum as Father Vallejo
- Luz Alba as Wateeka
- Tommy Cook as Ponca
- Tony Barr as Yuba
- Helen Servis as Mrs. Beggs
- Milton Kibbee as Mr. Beggs

== Bibliography ==
- Goble, Alan. The Complete Index to Literary Sources in Film. Walter de Gruyter, 1999.
