= Search for Danger =

1949 film by Jack Bernhard

- Directed by: Jack Bernhard
- Written by: Jerome Epstein; Michael Arlen; Don Martin
- Produced by: Don Martin; George Moskov
- Starring: John Calvert; Albert Dekker; Myrna Dell; Ben Welden
- Cinematography: Paul Ivano
- Edited by: Asa Boyd Clark
- Music by: Karl Hajos
- Production company: Falcon Pictures Corporation
- Distributed by: Film Classics
- Release date: April 15, 1949
- Running time: 62 minutes
- Country: United States
- Language: English

Search for Danger is a 1949 American crime film directed by Jack Bernhard and starring John Calvert, Albert Dekker and Myrna Dell. The film was the last of three made by the low-budget Film Classics company featuring Calvert as The Falcon who had previously been played by George Sanders and Tom Conway for RKO. The film's art direction was by Boris Leven.

== Plot ==
Mike Waring, a private detective in Los Angeles whose nickname is "The Falcon," is on a case. He follows a man named Andrews to a hotel, then reports back to his clients, club owners Kirk and Gregory, where the man, their business partner, can be found.

They pay Waring a $500 fee, whereupon Wilma Rogers, who works at the club and likes Andrews, expresses her displeasure with Waring for informing on him. She also tips off Andrews that his partners are coming. Kirk and Gregory return, angry not only that they can't find Andrews or the $100,000 he embezzled, but that a hotel clerk, Perry, was under the impression that Waring left Andrews' room carrying what appeared to be a lot of money.

Waring believes the club owners are trying to frame him. Elaine Carson offers to help, but before long Waring becomes suspicious of her behavior, too. Waring eventually is able to locate the missing money, which he gives to a police lieutenant, Cooper, for safekeeping. Then he exposes the real culprit behind Andrews' murder and the theft, Perry, the clerk.

== Cast ==
- John Calvert as Michael 'The Falcon' Waring
- Albert Dekker as Kirk
- Myrna Dell as Wilma Rogers
- Ben Welden as Gregory
- Douglas Fowley as The Inspector
- Michael Mark as Mr. Perry
- James Griffith as Lt. Cooper
- Ann Cornell as Elaine Carson
- Mauritz Hugo as Larry Andrews
- Peter Brocco as Morris Jason
- Peter Michael as Jailer
- Jack Daley as Drunk
- Billy Nelson as Gunman in Back Seat of Car

== Bibliography ==
- Hardy, Phil. The BFI Companion to Crime. University of California Press, 1997.
