= HMAS Emu =

1946 Royal Australian Navy tug boat

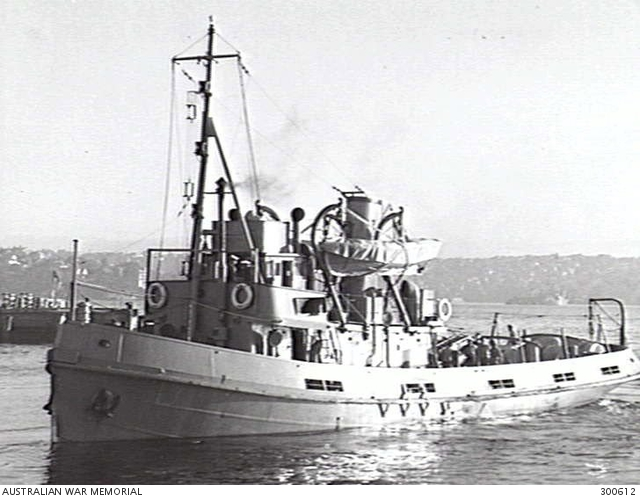
- HMAS Emu in 1952

History
- Name: (Australia) DT 931; (Australia) HMAS Emu; (Australia) Tenax
- Builder: Mort's Dock, Sydney
- Launched: 25 June 1946
- In service: 30 July 1946
- Fate: Active as of 1977

Australia
- Name: HMAS Emu
- Namesake: The Emu bird
- Commissioned: 30 July 1946
- Decommissioned: 17 December 1959
- Nickname(s): Grey Ghost of the North Coast
- Fate: Sold in 1967
- Badge

General characteristics
- Type: Diesel tug
- Displacement: 250 tons
- Length: 98 ft 9 in (30.10 m) o/a
- Beam: 21 ft 3 in (6.48 m)
- Draught: 8 ft (2.44 m)
- Propulsion: 1 × diesel engine, 510 horsepower (380 kW)
- Speed: 12 knots (22 km/h; 14 mph)
- Complement: 16 crew

HMAS Emu (DT931) was a tugboat that served in the Royal Australian Navy, between 1946 and 1959, largely as a salvage and rescue vessel in Northern Australian waters off Darwin.

== Construction and commissioning ==
HMAS Emu was built at Mort's Dock in Sydney, Australia, and launched on 25 June 1946 as Diesel Tug (DT) 931. After trials in Sydney, she was commissioned under Lieutenant Cyril M Boas, RANR (S) on 30 July 1946. She would not be renamed HMAS Emu until December 1950.

== Service ==
DT 931 would arrive in her home waters off Darwin in January 1947, where she quickly commenced a variety of jobs outside her primary role, as she was also the only Naval vessel based in the North of Australia between Cairns and Broome. She would be employed as a patrol boat and surveillance ship, keeping track of Japanese pearling fleets in waters north of Australia. Her work in rescue and salvage however was most notable, as she rescued mariners in Darwin harbour as well as saving ships that had run aground on coral reefs.

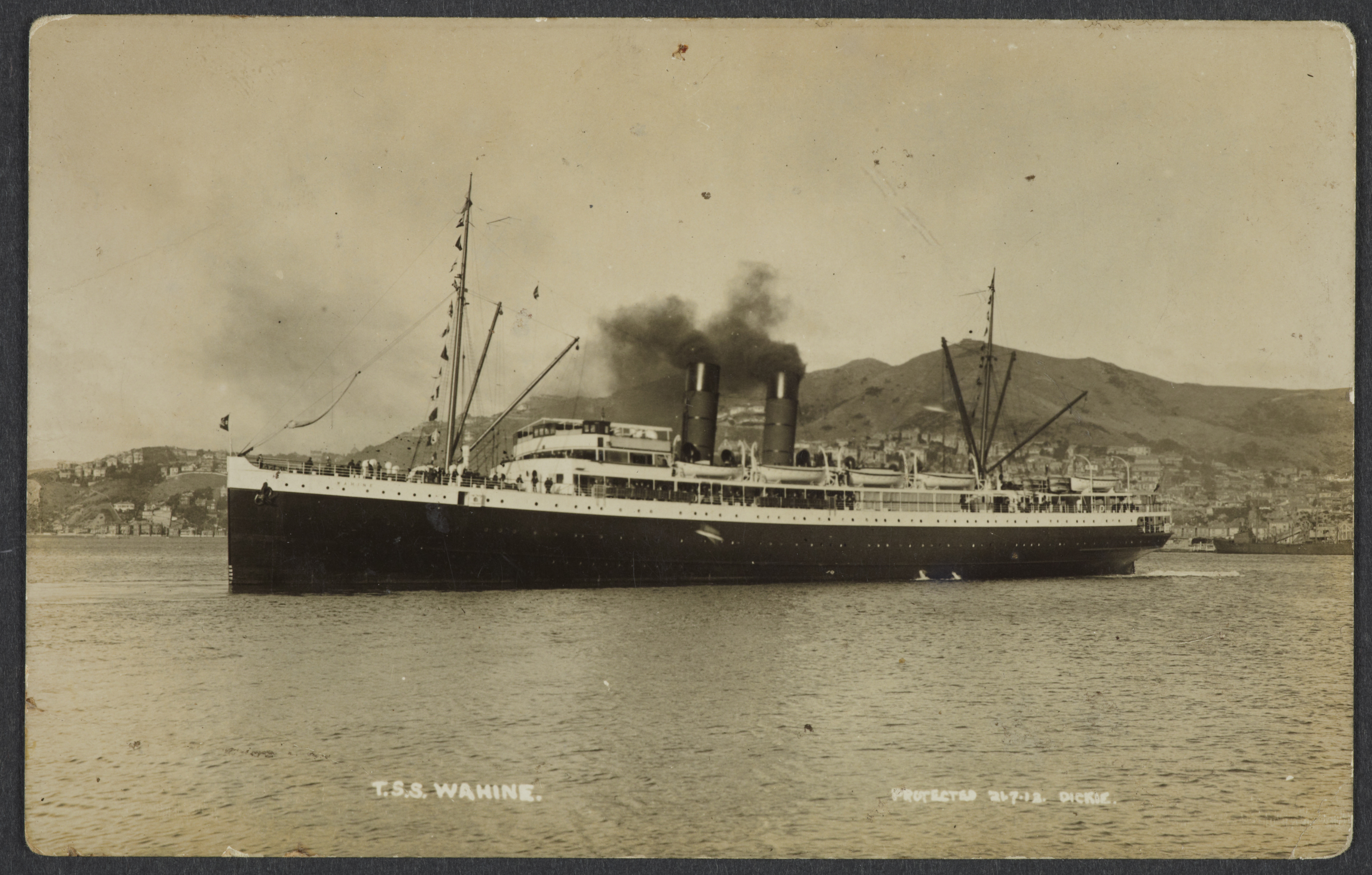
TSS Wahine in Wellington Harbour

Significant salvage and rescue operations kept the newly renamed Emu's crew busy during the 1950s. In August 1951, the New Zealand troopship Wahine was carrying 577 New Zealand troops to Korea, when she hit a reef near Masela Island, 250 miles (400 km) north of Darwin. While the passengers and crew were rescued by a passing freighter, stores and equipment were left on board. Emu's commanding officer, Lieutenant Commander John Toulouse, RANVR, overflew the ship in a Royal Australian Air Force (RAAF) aircraft to ascertain if the ship was salvageable. After discovering that the ship was beyond saving, Emu sailed the following day to recover what they could. All military equipment, as well as a quarter of the baggage on board, was recovered. However, as they were leaving the stricken vessel, they saw hundreds of people from Masela Island converging on Wahine. A follow up visit by Toulouse later confirmed that the vessel had been picked clean.

In 1953, Emu was damaged during a storm in January, being thrown against the wharf. Later that year, Emu assisted MV Illawarra, a small merchant vessel grounded on a reef near the Wessel Islands in November. Emu was able to rescue the 12 crew members, later re-floating and towing her for repairs.

Emu again rescued mariners on 11 March 1957, when unidentified men had been sighted on Bathurst Island in the Tiwi Islands north of Darwin. Upon arriving, she found six survivors of the British Gold Seeker, a treasure vessel who had managed to make landfall in a 16-foot (4.9 m) lifeboat, after crossing the Timor Sea. Toulouse and Northern Territory police Sergeant Barrie Tiernan were forced to carry the exhausted men to Emu's boat, before taking them to Darwin.

=== Sea Fox rescue ===
Emu's most bizarre rescue was that of Sea Fox in July 1959. Sea Fox was a yacht built in Boston in 1915 that American actor and magician John Calvert had fitted to take a hypnotism and magic act around the world in 1957. By 1959 he arrived in Darwin, where he impressed audiences with a show that included Pilita Corrales, a Filipino singer; Jimmy the Chimp, a chimpanzee who had starred alongside Calvert in the 1956 film Dark Venture and smoked cigarettes; and five crew who doubled as stage assistants.

Although Jimmy was not permitted off the vessel due to quarantine laws, the Darwin shows were successful and Sea Fox soon began a journey to Sydney on 30 June. However, a religious mission on Elcho Island picked up a distress message from Calvert on 5 July, stating that she was taking on water. No position was received and a two day search by the RAAF proved fruitless. After another message from Calvert was received, her general location was known. However, his refusal to allow a general call for assistance to all traffic during the search caused questions to be raised about the true nature of the emergency.

Eventually, on 8 July, Sea Fox was spotted by a RAAF Lincoln in the Arafura Sea. Emu sailed to her position, and at 07:30 the following day, the crew sighted the vessel. Upon boarding her, the vessel was found to be in a poor state, with damage to sails and rigging, as well as a bad leak. The crew were exhausted, having spent the last four days bailing essentially non-stop due to the failure of her pump. Jimmy was caged on the deck and had not eaten in days. Emu's commanding officer, Lieutenant MB Rayment, and Calvert then argued over the state and future of Sea Fox: Rayment was adamant that she be taken to nearby Elcho Island for repairs, but Calvert insisted that he be allowed to take her to Thursday Island. Fuel and water was provided to Calvert, but Rayment remained on board for the journey to Thursday Island.

This journey proved futile, however, as Sea Fox quickly failed and stopped in the water. Rayment finally got his wish and the course was set for Elcho Island. Calvert continued to be difficult, refusing to accept a tow line from Emu due to concerns over salvage rights. As bad weather rolled in and Rayment signed a letter guaranteeing no salvage rights would be claimed, Calvert finally gave in and accepted the line at 11:15 on 11 July. The two vessels finally reaching Elcho Island at 16:00 the following day. Sea Fox was further damaged during repairs and abandoned on Elcho by Calvert, along with Jimmy, who was eventually rescued by Sydney's Taronga Park Zoo, later being relocated to Perth Zoo, where he died in 1968 from a heart attack at only 16.

The rescue mission cost the Navy £30,000, and an investigation into the matter was raised due to a claim from one Sea Fox crew member that Calvert had orchestrated the rescue as a publicity stunt. However, the claim was never proven.

== Decommissioning and fate ==
On 16 November 1959, Emu left Darwin for the last time as a commissioned vessel, sailing to Sydney on her farewell voyage. Stopping in Cairns and Brisbane along the way, she arrived in Sydney on 14 December 1959, being paid-off into reserve on 17 December 1959. She remained in reserve until 2 May 1967, when she was sold. She was placed into commercial service, returning to Northern Australian waters until at least 1977 under the name Tenax.
