= Herbert Rudley =

American actor (1911-2006)

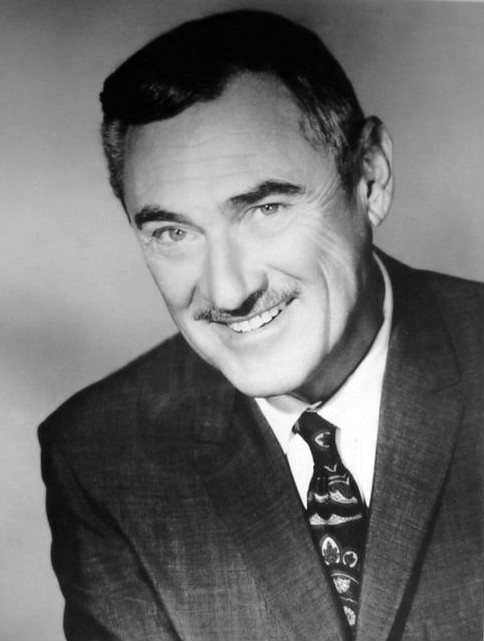
- Rudley in The Mothers-in-Law
- Born: Herbert David Shapiro; March 22, 1910; Philadelphia, Pennsylvania, U.S.
- Died: September 9, 2006 (aged 96); Los Angeles, California, U.S.
- Occupation: Actor
- Years active: 1926–1983
- Spouses: Ann Loring (m. 1940; div. 1955) Marilyn M. Perl (m. 1958)
- Children: 2

Herbert Rudley (March 22, 1910 – September 9, 2006) was an American character actor who appeared on stage, films and on television.

== Early life ==
Rudley was born in Philadelphia and attended Temple University. He left Temple after winning a scholarship to Eva Le Gallienne's Civic Repertory Theatre. He studied with that group for six months and then began performing professionally with it.

== Stage ==
Rudley acted with the Repertory Theatre for most of three seasons. He first appeared on stage in 1926 and had his Broadway debut in 1931, appearing in Did I Say No. Other Broadway credits include How Long Till Summer (1949), Sons and Soldiers (1942), Macbeth (1941), Eight O'Clock Tuesday (1940), Another Sun (1939), The World We Make (1939), The Eternal Road (1936), Battle Hymn (1935), Mother (1935), The Threepenny Opera (1932) and We, the People (1932). He also appeared in Abe Lincoln in Illinois.

Rudley and Keenan Wynn joined forces in the mid-1940s to create Players Production, a small theater venue in Los Angeles with the goal of presenting revivals of plays.

Rudley was also a playwright who wrote Shadow on the Wall and, along with Fanya Lawrence, created the farce Adam Ate the Apple.

== Film ==
In 1940 Rudley appeared in the film version of Abe Lincoln in Illinois. For the next four decades he appeared in dozens of supporting film roles, including The Seventh Cross (1944) and Rhapsody in Blue (1945), a fictionalized biography of George Gershwin in which he portrayed Ira Gershwin. He appeared in A Walk in the Sun (1945), Joan of Arc (1948) and The Young Lions (1958).

Rudley played a doctor who resuscitates a presumably executed convict in Decoy, and conversely played a nearly executed doctor who is thought dead and resuscitated by Basil Rathbone in The Black Sleep.

== Television ==
On television, Rudley appeared both in dramas, often as military men, and comedies. He appeared on seven episodes of the CBS series "You Are There" hosted by Walter Cronkite. He also appeared on My Friend Flicka.

In 1956, he played the lead character “Emmett Eagan” in the episode “The Man Who Would Be Marshall” on the TV Western Gunsmoke (S2E37).

In 1957, he appeared in the role of Sam Brennan in some early episodes of NBC's western drama, The Californians, set in the San Francisco gold rush of the 1850s. That same year he guest starred as “Emmett Egan”, a rich man who was bored with life so he tried to pay Matt Dillon to quit so he could become Marshall of Dodge City on Gunsmoke in “The Man Who Would Be Marshal” (S2E37).

He made four guest appearances on Perry Mason between 1958-1962 including the part of murderer George Durrell in 1958’s “The Case of the Prodigal Parent” and as Edward Nelson in the 1960 episode "The Case of the Gallant Grafter". He was one of only eleven actors to play all three pivotal roles in Perry Mason episodes—victim, defendant and murderer.

In 1959, he appeared as John McAuliffe on Border Patrol and as Col. Sam Percy on Maverick. He guest starred twice as Jeremy Thorne in NBC's western series Laramie. In the sixties he co-starred in two short-lived NBC half-hours, the drama, "Michael Shayne" with Richard Denning in 1960-61 and the Juliet Prowse comedy Mona McCluskey in 1965-66. In 1963, he appeared in two episodes of The Beverly Hillbillies. Also that year, he played the part of an overbearing father in "The All-Night Party" episode of Leave it to Beaver.

In 1973, Rudley guest starred in one episode of Griff. From 1967 through 1969 he co-starred as Herb Hubbard for two seasons on NBC-TV's The Mothers-in-Law with Eve Arden and Kaye Ballard. In 1981, he made four appearances on Dallas as an attorney who represented J.R. Ewing.

== Personal life ==
Rudley was married four times. His first marriage was to Ann Loring with whom he had a son. Rudley had two sons and two stepdaughters.

Rudley lived in Marina del Rey, California. He died in Los Angeles, California, on September 9, 2006, aged 96.

== Filmography ==
Year	Title	Role	Notes
1940	Abe Lincoln in Illinois	Seth Gale	
1944	The Seventh Cross	Franz Marnet	
1944	Marriage Is a Private Affair	Ted Mortimer	
1944	The Master Race	John	
1945	Brewster's Millions	Nopper Harrison	
1945	Rhapsody in Blue	Ira Gershwin	
1945	A Walk in the Sun	Sgt. Eddie Porter	
1946	Decoy	Dr. Lloyd L. Craig	
1948	Casbah	Claude	
1948	Hollow Triumph	Marcy	
1948	Joan of Arc	Isambard de la Pierre	
1954	The Silver Chalice	Linus	
1955	Artists and Models	Secret Service Chief Samuels	
1955	The Court Jester	Captain of the Guard	
1956	Raw Edge	Gerald Montgomery	
1956	That Certain Feeling	Doctor Summers	
1956	The Black Sleep	Dr. Gordon Angus Ramsay	
1958	The Young Lions	Capt. Colclough	
1958	The Bravados	Sheriff Eloy Sanchez	
1958	Tonka	Capt. Benteen	
1959	The Big Fisherman	Emperor Tiberius	
1959	The Jayhawkers!	Gov. William Clayton	
1959	Beloved Infidel	Stan Harris	
1960	Hell Bent for Leather	Perrick	
1960	The Great Impostor	Senior Officer	
1962	Follow That Dream	Mr. Endicott	
1972	Call Her Mom	Mr. Guiness	ABC Movie of the Week
1980	Falling in Love Again	Mr. Wellington (1940's)	
1983	Forever and Beyond	Robert	(final film role)

== Interviews ==
- Scary Monsters Magazine (January 2008) no. 65 "The Black Sleep: An Interview With Herbert Rudley" Interview by Lawrence Fultz Jr.
- Monster Bash Magazine (2006) no. 5 "On The Set of The Black Sleep" Interview by Lawrence Fultz, Jr.
