= John Calvert (magician) =

American magician and film actor (1911–2013)

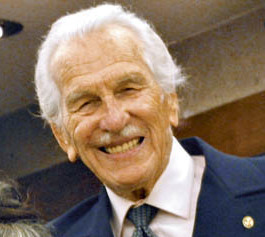
- Born: August 5, 1911; New Trenton, Indiana, U.S.
- Died: September 27, 2013 (aged 102); Lancaster, California, U.S.
- Occupations: Magician, actor

Madren Elbern "John" Calvert (August 5, 1911 – September 27, 2013) was an American magician and film actor. He performed on stage (including Broadway) for eight decades both in the United States and worldwide. Siegfried & Roy cited him as an inspiration, and Bess Houdini said that he was second only to Harry Houdini in "play(ing) the part of a magician."

He was also an actor who appeared in numerous movies and was the subject of a biographical documentary entitled John Calvert – His Magic and Adventures. The Society of Young Magicians (S.Y.M.) Assembly #29 of the Boston area is named after John Calvert.

== Early years ==
Calvert was born in New Trenton, Indiana and became fascinated with magic at age eight when his father took him to see the magician Howard Thurston perform in Cincinnati, Ohio. Shortly afterward, he performed his first trick for his Sunday school class - he made an egg appear from under another boy's coat.

He made his initial magic tour when he was eighteen, performing in town halls in Kentucky backroad towns. His small troupe consisted of one assistant and "Gyp the Wonder Dog". He returned home with a $2.65 profit.

== Depression era to the mid 1940s ==
During the Great Depression and into the 1940s, he continually increased the size of his magic show, adding illusions and personnel. He gained notoriety by performing daredevil stunts for publicity.

== Acting career ==
From the mid-1940s through the late 1950s, he performed in approximately forty films, including starring roles in three Film Classic releases, in which he portrayed a debonair detective known as "The Falcon". He also played as himself in a Singaporean Malay movie in 1971, Mat Magic.

== Fifties-onwards ==
Calvert continued performing magic during his Hollywood days. In the mid-1940s, he transported his show's equipment and personnel worldwide in a Douglas DC-3 airliner, and in later years on yachts — especially his own designed 120-foot yacht Sea Fox.

=== Sea Fox ===
In July 1959, the Royal Australian Navy tugboat HMAS Emu rescued the badly-damaged Sea Fox off of Australia's Northern Territory. On board were Calvert, a chimpanzee named Jimmy the Chimp, and Filipina singer Pilita Corrales. Sea Fox was further damaged during repairs and abandoned on Elcho Island.

== Awards and accolades ==
In 2007, IBM Ring 257 named him Magician of the Year.

His biographer, William V. Rauscher, has called Calvert a "real-life Indiana Jones" because of his reputation for surviving dangerous circumstances in his travels. Even at age 100, Calvert traveled extensively, lecturing and performing magic.

Calvert was invited to perform his magic act both on Broadway in New York City and at the London Palladium Theatre on his 100th birthday.

== Personal life ==
Calvert married his wife Tammy in 1982. He died on September 27, 2013, aged 102, in Bowling Green, Kentucky.

== Filmography ==
Year	Title	Role	Notes
1943	Bombardier	Calvert the Magician	Uncredited
1944	Ali Baba and the Forty Thieves	Thief	Uncredited
1944	Are These Our Parents?	The Great Gaspar - Magician	
1944	The Mark of the Whistler	Eddie Donnelly	
1945	Youth on Trial	Jud Lowry	
1945	The Return of the Durango Kid	Lee Kirby	
1945	Ten Cents a Dance	Breezy Walker	
1945	Lawless Empire	Blaze Howard	Uncredited
1948	Devil's Cargo	Michael Watley / The Falcon	
1948	Appointment with Murder	Michael Watley / The Falcon	
1949	Search for Danger	Michael Watley / The Falcon	
1952	Gold Fever	John Bonar	
1956	Dark Venture	John Kenyon	(final film role)
1971	Mat Magic	Mr. John Calvert	Produced by Cathay-Keris studio, this film marked an early creative collaboration between Singapore and Hollywood.
