= Gold Fever (film) =

1952 film

- Directed by: Leslie Goodwins
- Written by: Edgar B. Anderson Jr. Cliff Lancaster; John Calvert
- Produced by: John Calvert
- Starring: John Calvert; Ralph Morgan; Gene Roth
- Cinematography: Glen Gano; Clark Ramsey
- Edited by: John F. Link Sr.
- Music by: Johnny Richards
- Production company: Monogram Pictures
- Distributed by: Monogram Pictures
- Release date: June 15, 1952
- Running time: 63 minutes
- Country: United States
- Language: English

Gold Fever is a 1952 American Western film directed by Leslie Goodwins and starring John Calvert, Ralph Morgan and Gene Roth.

== Cast ==
- John Calvert as John Bonar
- Ralph Morgan as Nugget Jack
- Ann Cornell as Rusty
- Gene Roth as Bill Johnson
- Tom Kennedy as Big Tom
- Judd Holdren as Jud Jerson
- Danny Rense as Ward Henry
- Robert Graham as Cougar
- George Morrell as Recorder of Claims

== Bibliography ==
- Pitts, Michael R. Western Movies: A Guide to 5,105 Feature Films. McFarland, 2012.
