= Unknown Island =

1948 adventure film directed by Jack Bernhard

- Film poster
- Directed by: Jack Bernhard
- Written by: Story: Robert T. Shannon Screenplay; Robert T. Shannon; Jack Harvey
- Produced by: Albert J. Cohen
- Starring: Virginia Grey; Phillip Reed; Richard Denning; Barton MacLane; Ray Corrigan
- Cinematography: Fred Jackman Jr. Robert Gough; Milton Gold
- Edited by: Harry Gerstad
- Music by: Raoul Kraushaar (credited as Ralph Stanley)
- Production company: Albert Jay Cohen Productions
- Distributed by: Film Classics
- Release date: October 15, 1948
- Running time: 75 minutes
- Country: United States
- Language: English
- Budget: $400,000
- Box office: over $1 million (est.)

Unknown Island is a 1948 American adventure film directed by Jack Bernhard and starring Virginia Grey, Phillip Reed and Richard Denning. Shot in Cinecolor it was released by Film Classics and in Britain by General Film Distributors.

== Review ==
In a shameless and cheap purloin of the“King Kong” voyage to Skull Island theme, Ted Osborne and his fiancée Carole hire Captain Tarnowski to take them to a mysterious island where Osborne claims dinosaurs live. Tarnowski’s friend Fairbanks, a traumatized survivor of a past shipwreck there, reluctantly joins them.

On the voyage, tensions rise—Fairbanks grows fond of Carole, and the crew suspects danger ahead. After a failed mutiny, they reach the island and confirm dinosaurs exist: paper mache’ Carnivale parade puppet brontosaurs, dimetrodons, ceratosaurs, and even a “giant sloth”, Crash Corrigan in a moth eaten gorilla suit.

The crew suffers attacks, accidents, and infighting. Tarnowski, obsessed with capturing a dinosaur and fueled by alcohol, becomes increasingly reckless. He kidnaps Carole, but she and Fairbanks escape. Tarnowski is eventually killed by the “giant sloth.”

In the end, Osborne, Carole, Fairbanks, and one other survivor manage to leave the island on Tarnowski’s ship. “

== Cast ==
- Virginia Grey as Carole Lane
- Phillip Reed as Ted Osborne
- Richard Denning as John Fairbanks
- Barton MacLane as Captain Tarnowski
- Dick Wessel as First Mate Sanderson
- Dan White as Edwards
- Phil Nazir as Chief Lascar
- Ray "Crash" Corrigan as The Sloth / Ceratosaurus
- Snub Pollard as a Singapore Barfly
- Harry Wilson as Barfly

== Public domain ==
Unknown Island is in the public domain. The film did have copyright filed on December 1, 1948, which was renewed on April 22, 1976. However, as the film was released on October 15, 1948, and the law stated that a film must be copyrighted before release, the copyright wasn't filed on time and is, by implication, invalid.

Stock footage from Unknown Island was used in the American version of Godzilla Raids Again and in Adventure at the Center of the Earth.

== See also ==
- List of films featuring dinosaurs
