= Chain of Circumstance =

1951 film

- Theatrical release poster
- Directed by: Will Jason
- Written by: David Lang
- Produced by: Wallace MacDonald
- Starring: Richard Grayson; Margaret Field; Marta Mitrovich; Harold J. Kennedy; Helen Wallace; Connie Gilchrist
- Cinematography: Philip Tannura
- Edited by: Aaron Stell
- Production company: Columbia Pictures
- Distributed by: Columbia Pictures
- Release date: August 23, 1951
- Running time: 68 minutes
- Country: United States
- Language: English

Chain of Circumstance is a 1951 American drama film directed by Will Jason, written by David Lang and starring Richard Grayson, Margaret Field and Marta Mitrovich. The film was released on August 23, 1951 by Columbia Pictures.

== Cast ==
- Richard Grayson as Tom Dawson
- Margaret Field as Dell Dawson
- Marta Mitrovich as Evie Carpenter
- Harold J. Kennedy as Marvin
- Helen Wallace as Emily Greer
- Connie Gilchrist as Mrs. Mullins
- Lawrence Dobkin as Dr. Callen
- Sumner Getchell as Fred Martindale
- James Griffith as Sid
- Oliver Blake as Traeger
- Percy Helton as Fogel
- Douglas Fowley as Lt. Fenning
- Carleton Young as Lt. Sands
