= List of adventure films of the 1940s =

The following is a list of adventure films released in the 1940s.

== 1940 ==
Title	Director	Cast	Country	Subgenre/Notes
An Adventure of Salvator Rosa	Alessandro Blasetti	Gino Cervi, Luisa Ferida, Rina Morelli, Paolo Stoppa	Italy	
Brazza ou l'épopée du Congo	Léon Poirier	Robert Darène	France	
Captain Caution	Richard Wallace	Victor Mature, Bruce Cabot, Alan Ladd, Louise Platt	United States	Sea adventure
Captain Fracasse	Duilio Coletti	Giorgio Costantini, Elsa De Giorgi	Italy	
Dark Streets of Cairo	László Kardos	Ralph Byrd, George Zucco	United States	
The Daughter of the Green Pirate	Enrico Guazzoni	Doris Duranti, Fosco Giachetti	Italy	Pirate film
The Devil's Pipeline	Christy Cabanne	Richard Arlen, Andy Devine	United States	
Drums of Fu Manchu	William Witney	Henry Brandon, William Royle, Olaf Hytten, Luana Walters	United States	Serial
Drums of the Desert	George Waggner	Ralph Byrd, Lorna Gray, George Lynn	United States	Romantic adventure
Fanfulla da Lodi	Carlo Duse, Giulio Antamoro	Ennio Cerlesi, Germana Paolieri	Italy	
The Fire Devil	Luis Trenker	Luis Trenker, Judith Holzmeister, Hilde von Stolz	Nazi Germany	
Flash Gordon Conquers the Universe	Ford Beebe, Ray Taylor	Buster Crabbe, Carol Hughes, Roland Drew	United States	Serial, space adventure
Forty Thousand Horsemen	Charles Chauvel	Grant Taylor, Betty Bryant, Pat Twohill, Chips Rafferty	Australia	War adventure
Green Hell	James Whale	Douglas Fairbanks Jr., Joan Bennett, George Sanders	United States	Adventure drama
I Was an Adventuress	Gregory Ratoff	Vera Zorina, Richard Greene, Erich von Stroheim, Peter Lorre	United States	
Island of Doomed Men	Charles Barton	Peter Lorre, Rochelle Hudson, Robert Wilcox	United States	
The Long Voyage Home	John Ford	John Wayne, Thomas Mitchell, Ian Hunter	United States	
The Man from Niger	Jacques de Baroncelli	Victor Francen, Harry Baur, Jacques Dumesnil, Annie Ducaux	France	
The Mark of Zorro	Rouben Mamoulian	Tyrone Power, Linda Darnell, Basil Rathbone	United States	Western
Moon Over Burma	Louis King	Dorothy Lamour, Robert Preston, Preston Foster, Albert Bassermann	United States	Romantic adventure
The Mummy's Hand	Christy Cabanne	Dick Foran, Peggy Moran, George Zucco	United States	Horror adventure
Northwest Passage	King Vidor	Spencer Tracy, Robert Young, Walter Brennan	United States	Western
One Million B.C.	Hal Roach	Victor Mature, Carole Landis, Lon Chaney Jr.	United States	Fantasy adventure
Outside the Three-Mile Limit	Lewis D. Collins	Jack Holt, Harry Carey, Sig Ruman	United States	Sea adventure
Il ponte dei sospiri	Mario Bonnard	Otello Toso, Mariella Lotti, Paola Barbara	Italy	
Road to Singapore	Victor Schertzinger	Bing Crosby, Bob Hope, Dorothy Lamour, Anthony Quinn	United States	Adventure comedy
Safari	Edward H. Griffith	Douglas Fairbanks Jr., Madeleine Carroll	United States	
Santa Fe Trail	Michael Curtiz	Errol Flynn, Olivia de Havilland, Ronald Reagan	United States	
The Sea Hawk	Michael Curtiz	Errol Flynn, Brenda Marshall, Claude Rains	United States	Pirate film
The Son of Monte Cristo	Rowland V. Lee	Louis Hayward, Joan Bennett, George Sanders	United States	
South of Pago Pago	Alfred E. Green	Jon Hall, Frances Farmer, Victor McLaglen	United States	
South to Karanga	Harold Schuster	Charles Bickford, James Craig	United States	
Strange Cargo	Frank Borzage	Clark Gable, Joan Crawford, Ian Hunter, Peter Lorre, Paul Lukas	United States	Adventure drama
Swiss Family Robinson	Edward Ludwig	Thomas Mitchell, Edna Best, Freddie Bartholomew, Tim Holt	United States	
Terry and the Pirates	James W. Horne	William Tracy, Granville Owen, Joyce Bryant, Sheila Darcy	United States	Serial
The Thief of Bagdad	Ludwig Berger, Michael Powell, Tim Whelan	Conrad Veidt, Sabu, June Duprez, John Justin, Rex Ingram	United States; United Kingdom	Fantasy adventure
Torrid Zone	William Keighley	James Cagney, Ann Sheridan, Pat O'Brien	United States	
Trenck the Pandur	Herbert Selpin	Hans Albers, Sybille Schmitz, Käthe Dorsch	Nazi Germany	
Typhoon	Louis King	Dorothy Lamour, Robert Preston	United States	
Victory	John Cromwell	Fredric March, Betty Field, Cedric Hardwicke	United States	
Zanzibar	Harold Schuster	Lola Lane, James Craig	United States	

== 1941 ==
Title	Director	Cast	Country	Subgenre/Notes
49th Parallel	Powell and Pressburger	Leslie Howard, Laurence Olivier, Eric Portman, Anton Walbrook, Raymond Massey	United Kingdom	War adventure
The Blonde from Singapore	Edward Dmytryk	Florence Rice, Leif Erickson	United States	
Bombay Clipper	John Rawlins	William Gargan, Irene Hervey, Maria Montez, Turhan Bey	United States	
Burma Convoy	Noel M. Smith	Charles Bickford, Evelyn Ankers, Turhan Bey	United States	
Caravaggio	Goffredo Alessandrini	Amedeo Nazzari	Italy	
Carl Peters	Herbert Selpin	Hans Albers	Nazi Germany	
Il cavaliere senza nome	Ferruccio Cerio	Amedeo Nazzari	Italy	
The Corsican Brothers	Gregory Ratoff	Douglas Fairbanks Jr., Ruth Warrick, Akim Tamiroff	United States	
Forced Landing	Gordon Wiles	Richard Arlen, Eva Gabor, J. Carrol Naish, Nils Asther	United States	
The Hero of Venice	Carlo Campogalliani	Rossano Brazzi, Gustav Diessl, Paola Barbara, Valentina Cortese	Italy	
Hudson's Bay	Irving Pichel	Paul Muni, Gene Tierney, Vincent Price	United States	
I Was a Prisoner on Devil's Island	Lew Landers	Sally Eilers, Donald Woods	United States	
The Iron Crown	Alessandro Blasetti	Massimo Girotti, Gino Cervi, Elisa Cegani	Italy	Fantasy adventure
Jungle Girl	John English, William Witney	Frances Gifford, Tom Neal, Trevor Bardette, Gerald Mohr	United States	Serial
Jungle Man	Harry L. Fraser	Buster Crabbe, Charles B. Middleton, Sheila Darcy	United States	
Law of the Tropics	Ray Enright	Constance Bennett, Jeffrey Lynn	United States	
Marco Visconti	Mario Bonnard	Carlo Ninchi, Mariella Lotti	Italy	
The Mask of Cesare Borgia	Duilio Coletti	Osvaldo Valenti, Carlo Tamberlani	Italy	
Mutiny in the Arctic	John Rawlins	Richard Arlen, Andy Devine	United States	Arctic adventure
Pirates of Malaya	Enrico Guazzoni	Luigi Pavese, Massimo Girotti	Italy	
Raiders of the Desert	John Rawlins	Richard Arlen, Andy Devine, Maria Montez, Turhan Bey	United States	Adventure comedy
Road to Zanzibar	Victor Schertzinger	Bing Crosby, Bob Hope, Dorothy Lamour	United States	Adventure comedy
The Sea Wolf	Michael Curtiz	Edward G. Robinson, Ida Lupino, John Garfield	United States	Sea adventure
South of Tahiti	George Waggner	Maria Montez, Brian Donlevy, Broderick Crawford, Andy Devine	United States	Sea adventure
Sundown	Henry Hathaway	Gene Tierney, Bruce Cabot, George Sanders	United States	
Swamp Water	Jean Renoir	Walter Brennan, Walter Huston, Anne Baxter, Dana Andrews	United States	
Tarzan's Secret Treasure	Richard Thorpe	Johnny Weissmuller, Maureen O'Sullivan	United States	
They Met in Bombay	Clarence Brown	Clark Gable, Rosalind Russell, Peter Lorre	United States	

== 1942 ==
Title	Director	Cast	Country	Subgenre/Notes
Adventurer	Gunnar Olsson	Sture Lagerwall	Sweden	
The Adventures of Fra Diavolo	Luigi Zampa	Enzo Fiermonte, Elsa De Giorgi	Italy	
Arabian Nights	John Rawlins	Sabu, Jon Hall, María Montez, Leif Erickson	United States; United Kingdom	Romantic adventure
Attack on Baku	Fritz Kirchhoff	Willy Fritsch, René Deltgen	Nazi Germany	
The Black Swan	Henry King	Tyrone Power, Maureen O'Hara, George Sanders	United States	Pirate film
Cairo	W. S. Van Dyke	Jeanette MacDonald, Robert Young, Ethel Waters, Lionel Atwill	United States	Musical
Captain Tempest	Corrado D'Errico	Doris Duranti, Carla Candiani, Carlo Ninchi, Adriano Rimoldi	Italy; Spain	
Casablanca	Michael Curtiz	Humphrey Bogart, Ingrid Bergman, Paul Henreid, Claude Rains, Conrad Veidt, Peter Lorre, Sydney Greenstreet, Dooley Wilson, S. K. Sakall, Leonid Kinskey, Curt Bois, Marcel Dalio	United States	
Don Cesare di Bazan	Riccardo Freda	Gino Cervi, Anneliese Uhlig, Paolo Stoppa	Italy	
Drums of the Congo	Christy Cabanne	Ona Munson, Stuart Erwin, Peggy Moran	United States	Adventure drama
The Gaucho War	Lucas Demare	Enrique Muiño, Francisco Petrone, Ángel Magaña, Sebastián Chiola, Amelia Bence	Argentina	
Hitler – Dead or Alive	Nick Grinde	Ward Bond, Dorothy Tree, Warren Hymer	United States	War adventure
The Jester's Supper	Alessandro Blasetti	Amedeo Nazzari, Clara Calamai, Osvaldo Valenti	Italy	
Jungle Book	Zoltan Korda	Sabu	United States	Family-oriented adventure
Jungle Siren	Sam Newfield	Ann Corio, Buster Crabbe	United States	
Law of the Jungle	Jean Yarbrough	Arline Judge, John "Dusty" King, Mantan Moreland	United States	
The Lion of Damascus	Corrado D'Errico	Doris Duranti, Carla Candiani, Carlo Ninchi, Adriano Rimoldi	Italy; Spain	
Pardon My Sarong	Erle C. Kenton	Bud Abbott, Lou Costello, Lionel Atwill	United States	Adventure comedy
Perils of Nyoka	William Witney	Kay Aldridge, Clayton Moore, Lorna Gray, Charles Middleton	United States	Serial
Reap the Wild Wind	Cecil B. DeMille	Ray Milland, John Wayne, Paulette Goddard, Raymond Massey, Robert Preston, Susan Hayward	United States	Sea adventure
Ride Tonight!	Gustaf Molander	Lars Hanson, Oscar Ljung, Gerd Hagman	Sweden	
Road to Morocco	David Butler	Bing Crosby, Bob Hope, Dorothy Lamour	United States	Adventure comedy, romantic adventure
Simón Bolívar	Miguel Contreras Torres	Julián Soler	Mexico	
Son of Fury: The Story of Benjamin Blake	John Cromwell	Tyrone Power, Gene Tierney, George Sanders	United States	
The Spoilers	Ray Enright	Marlene Dietrich, John Wayne, Randolph Scott	United States	Western, romantic adventure
Tarzan's New York Adventure	Richard Thorpe	Johnny Weissmuller, Maureen O'Sullivan	United States	
The Tuttles of Tahiti	Charles Vidor	Charles Laughton, Jon Hall, Peggy Drake, Victor Francen, Curt Bois	United States	
A Yank on the Burma Road	George B. Seitz	Barry Nelson, Laraine Day, Keye Luke	United States	War adventure

== 1943 ==
Title	Director	Cast	Country	Subgenre/Notes
Action in the North Atlantic	Lloyd Bacon, Byron Haskin, Raoul Walsh	Humphrey Bogart, Raymond Massey	United States	Sea adventure, war adventure
Adventure in Iraq	D. Ross Lederman	John Loder, Ruth Ford, Warren Douglas	United States	Adventure drama
Alaska Highway	Frank McDonald	Richard Arlen, Jean Parker	United States	
Le Brigand gentilhomme	Émile Couzinet	Jean Weber, Robert Favart	France	
Captain Fracasse	Abel Gance	Fernand Gravey	France; Italy	
The Desert Song	Robert Florey	Dennis Morgan, Irene Manning, Bruce Cabot	United States	Musical
Five Graves to Cairo	Billy Wilder	Franchot Tone, Anne Baxter, Erich von Stroheim, Akim Tamiroff, Peter van Eyck	United States	War adventure
Flight for Freedom	Lothar Mendes	Rosalind Russell, Fred MacMurray, Herbert Marshall	United States	
For Whom the Bell Tolls	Sam Wood	Gary Cooper, Ingrid Bergman, Akim Tamiroff, Katina Paxinou	United States	
Germanin	Max W. Kimmich	Luis Trenker	Nazi Germany	
I Walked with a Zombie	Jacques Tourneur	Frances Dee, Tom Conway, James Ellison	United States	Horror adventure
Immortal Sergeant	John M. Stahl	Henry Fonda, Thomas Mitchell, Maureen O'Hara	United States	War adventure
Jack London	Alfred Santell	Michael O'Shea, Susan Hayward	United States	
Münchhausen	Josef von Báky	Hans Albers, Brigitte Horney, Ilse Werner, Ferdinand Marian	Nazi Germany	Fantasy adventure
Night Plane from Chungking	Ralph Murphy	Robert Preston, Ellen Drew	United States	War adventure
The Phantom	B. Reeves Eason	Tom Tyler, Jeanne Bates, Kenneth MacDonald, Joe Devlin, Frank Shannon	United States	Serial
Sahara	Zoltan Korda	Humphrey Bogart, Dan Duryea, Bruce Bennett, Lloyd Bridges, Rex Ingram	United States	War adventure
The Son of the Red Corsair	Marco Elter	Vittorio Sanipoli	Italy	Pirate film
Tarzan's Desert Mystery	Wilhelm Thiele	Johnny Weissmuller	United States	
Tarzan Triumphs	Wilhelm Thiele	Johnny Weissmuller	United States	
Tiger Fangs	Sam Newfield	Frank Buck, June Duprez	United States	
Two Hearts Among the Beasts	Giorgio Simonelli	Totò	Italy	Adventure comedy
Gli ultimi filibustieri	Marco Elter	Vittorio Sanipoli	Italy	Pirate film
White Savage	Arthur Lubin	Maria Montez, Jon Hall, Sabu, Turhan Bey, Sidney Toler	United States	

== 1944 ==
Title	Director	Cast	Country	Subgenre/Notes
Ali Baba and the Forty Thieves	Arthur Lubin	Maria Montez, Jon Hall, Turhan Bey	United States	
Le Bossu	Jean Delannoy	Pierre Blanchar	France	
Call of the Jungle	Phil Rosen	Ann Corio	United States	
Cobra Woman	Robert Siodmak	Maria Montez, Jon Hall, Sabu	United States	
El corsario negro	Chano Urueta	Pedro Armendáriz	Mexico	Pirate film
The Desert Hawk	B. Reeves Eason	Gilbert Roland, Mona Maris	United States	Serial
First on the Rope	Louis Daquin	André Le Gall, Irène Corday	France	
Frenchman's Creek	Mitchell Leisen	Joan Fontaine, Arturo de Córdova, Basil Rathbone	United States	Romantic adventure, Pirate film
The Great Alaskan Mystery	Lewis D. Collins, Ray Taylor	Ralph Morgan, Marjorie Weaver, Fuzzy Knight, Edgar Kennedy, Milburn Stone	United States	Serial
Haunted Harbor	Spencer Gordon Bennet, Wallace Grissell	Kane Richmond, Kay Aldridge	United States	Serial, sea adventure
Lifeboat	Alfred Hitchcock	Tallulah Bankhead, William Bendix, Walter Slezak	United States	Sea adventure, adventure drama
The Lieutenant Nun	Emilio Gómez Muriel	María Félix	Mexico	
The Mask of Dimitrios	Jean Negulesco	Peter Lorre, Sydney Greenstreet, Zachary Scott, Faye Emerson	United States	Thriller
Nabonga	Sam Newfield	Buster Crabbe, Julie London	United States	
Passage to Marseille	Michael Curtiz	Humphrey Bogart, Michèle Morgan, Claude Rains, Sydney Greenstreet, Peter Lorre	United States	
The Princess and the Pirate	David Butler	Bob Hope, Virginia Mayo, Victor McLaglen, Walter Slezak, Walter Brennan	United States	Adventure comedy, Pirate film
The Tiger Woman	Spencer Gordon Bennet, Wallace Grissell	Linda Stirling, Allan Lane, Duncan Renaldo, George J. Lewis	United States	Serial
To Have and Have Not	Howard Hawks	Humphrey Bogart, Lauren Bacall, Walter Brennan	United States	Sea adventure

== 1945 ==
Title	Director	Cast	Country	Subgenre/Notes
The Black Cavalier	Gilles Grangier	Georges Guétary	France	
Captain Eddie	Lloyd Bacon	Fred MacMurray	United States	
Captain Kidd	Rowland V. Lee	Charles Laughton, Randolph Scott, Barbara Britton, John Carradine, Gilbert Roland	United States	Pirate film
A Game of Death	Robert Wise	John Loder, Audrey Long, Edgar Barrier	United States	
Jungle Queen	Lewis D. Collins, Ray Taylor	Edward Norris, Eddie Quillan, Douglass Dumbrille, Lois Collier, Ruth Roman, Tala Birell, Clarence Muse	United States	Serial
Jungle Raiders	Lesley Selander	Kane Richmond, Eddie Quillan, Veda Ann Borg	United States	Serial
The Naughty Nineties	Jean Yarbrough	Bud Abbott, Lou Costello	United States	Adventure comedy
Objective, Burma!	Raoul Walsh	Errol Flynn	United States	War adventure
Savage Pampas	Lucas Demare, Hugo Fregonese	Francisco Petrone, Luisa Vehil	Argentina	
The Spanish Main	Frank Borzage	Maureen O'Hara, Paul Henreid, Walter Slezak	United States	Pirate film
Tarzan and the Amazons	Kurt Neumann	Johnny Weissmuller	United States	
A Thousand and One Nights	Alfred E. Green	Cornel Wilde, Evelyn Keyes, Phil Silvers, Adele Jergens	United States	Fantasy adventure
The Wicked Lady	Leslie Arliss	Margaret Lockwood, James Mason	United Kingdom	

== 1946 ==
Title	Director	Cast	Country	Subgenre/Notes
The Bandit of Sherwood Forest	George Sherman, Henry Levin	Cornel Wilde, Anita Louise, Jill Esmond, Edgar Buchanan, Henry Daniell	United States	
Le Bateau à soupe	Maurice Gleize	Charles Vanel, Lucienne Laurence, Alfred Adam	France	Sea adventure
Black Eagle	Riccardo Freda	Rossano Brazzi, Gino Cervi, Irasema Dilián	Italy	
The Captain	Robert Vernay	Jean Pâqui, Pierre Renoir	France	
Caravan	Arthur Crabtree	Stewart Granger, Jean Kent	United Kingdom	Romantic adventure
Cyrano de Bergerac	Fernand Rivers	Claude Dauphin	France	
The Fighting Guardsman	Henry Levin	Willard Parker, Anita Louise, John Loder	United States	
Harald Handfaste	Hampe Faustman	George Fant, Georg Rydeberg, Elsie Albiin	Sweden	Adventure comedy
Lost City of the Jungle	Lewis D. Collins, Ray Taylor	Russell Hayden, Jane Adams, Lionel Atwill, Keye Luke	United States	Serial
Monsieur Beaucaire	George Marshall	Bob Hope, Joan Caulfield	United States	Adventure comedy
Night Boat to Dublin	Lawrence Huntington	Robert Newton	United Kingdom	Thriller, sea adventure
The Overlanders	Harry Watt	Chips Rafferty	Australia; United Kingdom	Adventure drama
Peter Voss, Thief of Millions	Karl Anton	Viktor de Kowa, Else von Möllendorff, Karl Schönböck	East Germany	Adventure comedy
Road to Utopia	Hal Walker	Bob Hope, Bing Crosby, Dorothy Lamour	United States	Adventure comedy
Sangue a Ca' Foscari	Max Calandri	Massimo Serato	Italy	
A Scandal in Paris	Douglas Sirk	George Sanders, Akim Tamiroff, Signe Hasso, Carole Landis	United States	
Son of the Guardsman	Derwin Abrahams	Bob Shaw, Daun Kennedy, Charles King, John Merton	United States	Serial
Strange Voyage	Irving Allen	Eddie Albert	United States	
Swamp Fire	William H. Pine	Johnny Weissmuller, Buster Crabbe	United States	
Tangier	George Waggner	Maria Montez, Robert Paige, Sabu, Preston Foster	United States	
Tarzan and the Leopard Woman	Kurt Neumann	Johnny Weissmuller, Acquanetta	United States	
Two Years Before the Mast	John Farrow	Alan Ladd, Brian Donlevy, William Bendix, Barry Fitzgerald	United States	Sea adventure
The Wife of Monte Cristo	Edgar G. Ulmer	Lenore Aubert, John Loder, Fritz Kortner, Martin Kosleck	United States	

== 1947 ==
Title	Director	Cast	Country	Subgenre/Notes
Adventure Island	Sam Newfield	Rory Calhoun, Rhonda Fleming	United States	
Bethsabée	Léonide Moguy	Danielle Darrieux, Georges Marchal, Paul Meurisse, Jean Murat	France	
Blonde Savage	Steve Sekely	Gale Sherwood	United States	
Brick Bradford	Spencer Gordon Bennet	Kane Richmond, Rick Vallin, Linda Johnson, Pierre Watkin	United States	Serial, space adventure
Bullet for Stefano	Duilio Coletti	Rossano Brazzi, Valentina Cortese	Italy	
Bush Christmas	Ralph Smart	Chips Rafferty, John Fernside	Australia; United Kingdom	Family-oriented adventure
Calcutta	John Farrow	Alan Ladd, Gail Russell, William Bendix, June Duprez	United States	
Captain from Castile	Henry King	Tyrone Power, Jean Peters, Cesar Romero, Lee J. Cobb	United States	
The Captain's Daughter	Mario Camerini	Cesare Danova, Amedeo Nazzari, Vittorio Gassman, Irasema Dilián	Italy	
Don Quixote	Rafael Gil	Rafael Rivelles, Juan Calvo Domenech	Spain	
The Exile	Max Ophüls	Douglas Fairbanks Jr., Maria Montez, Henry Daniell	United States	
Forever Amber	Otto Preminger	Linda Darnell, Cornel Wilde, Richard Greene, George Sanders	United States	Romantic adventure
Jungle Flight	Sam Newfield	Robert Lowery, Ann Savage, Bing Crosby	United States	
The Macomber Affair	Zoltan Korda	Gregory Peck, Joan Bennett, Robert Preston	United States	Adventure drama
The Man Within	Bernard Knowles	Richard Attenborough, Michael Redgrave, Jean Kent, Joan Greenwood	United Kingdom	Sea adventure
Mandrin	René Jayet	José Noguero	France	
Meet Me at Dawn	Thornton Freeland	William Eythe, Hazel Court, Margaret Rutherford, Stanley Holloway	United Kingdom	
Queen of the Amazons	Edward Finney	Robert Lowery, Patricia Morison	United States	
Road to Rio	Norman Z. McLeod	Bob Hope, Bing Crosby, Dorothy Lamour, Gale Sondergaard	United States	Adventure comedy
The Royalists	Henri Calef	Jean Marais, Madeleine Robinson	France	
The Sea Hound	W. B. Eason, Mack V. Wright	Buster Crabbe, Jimmy Lloyd, Pamela Blake	United States	Serial, sea adventure
Sinbad the Sailor	Richard Wallace	Douglas Fairbanks Jr., Maureen O'Hara, Anthony Quinn, Walter Slezak	United States	Action adventure
Singapore	John Brahm	Fred MacMurray, Ava Gardner	United States	
Slave Girl	Charles Lamont	Yvonne De Carlo, George Brent, Broderick Crawford	United States	Adventure comedy
Song of Scheherazade	Walter Reisch	Jean-Pierre Aumont, Yvonne De Carlo, Brian Donlevy	United States	Musical
Tarzan and the Huntress	Kurt Neumann	Johnny Weissmuller, Patricia Morison	United States	
Unconquered	Cecil B. DeMille	Gary Cooper, Paulette Goddard, Boris Karloff	United States	Western
The White Devil	Nunzio Malasomma	Rossano Brazzi	Italy	

== 1948 ==
Title	Director	Cast	Country	Subgenre/Notes
16 Fathoms Deep	Irving Allen	Lon Chaney, Arthur Lake, Lloyd Bridges	United States	Sea adventure
Adventures of Casanova	Roberto Gavaldón	Arturo de Córdova	United States; Mexico	
Adventures of Don Juan	Vincent Sherman	Errol Flynn, Viveca Lindfors, Robert Douglas	United States	Swashbuckler
Angel on the Amazon	John H. Auer	George Brent, Vera Ralston, Brian Aherne, Constance Bennett	United States	Romantic adventure
The Black Arrow	Gordon Douglas	Louis Hayward	United States	
Bonnie Prince Charlie	Anthony Kimmins	David Niven, Margaret Leighton, Jack Hawkins	United Kingdom	
Broken Journey	Ken Annakin	Phyllis Calvert, James Donald, Margot Grahame, Francis L. Sullivan, Guy Rolfe	United Kingdom	Adventure drama
I cavalieri dalle maschere nere	Pino Mercanti	Otello Toso, Lea Padovani, Massimo Serato	Italy	
Congo Bill	Spencer Gordon Bennet, Thomas Carr	Don McGuire, Cleo Moore, Jack Ingram, I. Stanford Jolley, Leonard Penn	United States	Serial
Daughter of the Jungle	George Blair	Lois Hall	United States	
Du Guesclin	Bernard de Latour	Fernand Gravey	France	
The Gallant Blade	Henry Levin	Larry Parks	United States	
Idol of Paris	Leslie Arliss	Beryl Baxter, Michael Rennie, Christine Norden	United Kingdom	Romantic adventure
Juan Moreira	Luis Moglia Barth	Floren Delbene, Dora Ferreyro, Nedda Francy, Fernando Ochoa	Argentina	
Jungle Goddess	Lewis D. Collins	Wanda McKay, George Reeves, Ralph Byrd	United States	
Jungle Jim	William Berke	Johnny Weissmuller	United States	
Kidnapped	William Beaudine	Roddy McDowall, Dan O'Herlihy	United States	
Louisiana Story	Robert J. Flaherty		United States	Docufiction
Man-Eater of Kumaon	Byron Haskin	Sabu, Wendell Corey, Joy Page, Morris Carnovsky	United States	
Miraculous Journey	Sam Newfield	Rory Calhoun, Audrey Long, Virginia Grey	United States	
The Mysterious Rider	Riccardo Freda	Vittorio Gassman, María Mercader, Yvonne Sanson, Gianna Maria Canale	Italy	
The Prince of Thieves	Howard Bretherton	Jon Hall, Patricia Morison	United States	
Rogues' Regiment	Robert Florey	Dick Powell, Marta Toren, Vincent Price	United States	War adventure
Saigon	Leslie Fenton	Alan Ladd, Veronica Lake	United States	
Scott of the Antarctic	Charles Frend	John Mills	United States	Adventure drama
Le Secret de Monte-Cristo	Albert Valentin	Pierre Brasseur	France	
Snowbound	David MacDonald	Dennis Price, Robert Newton, Herbert Lom, Marcel Dalio, Mila Parély, Stanley Holloway	United Kingdom	
The Swordsman	Joseph H. Lewis	Larry Parks	United States	
Tarzan and the Mermaids	Robert Florey	Johnny Weissmuller, Linda Christian, George Zucco	United States	
The Three Musketeers	George Sidney	Gene Kelly, Lana Turner, June Allyson, Van Heflin, Vincent Price	United States	
The Treasure of the Sierra Madre	John Huston	Humphrey Bogart, Walter Huston, Tim Holt	United States	Adventure drama, western
Unknown Island	Jack Bernhard	Virginia Grey, Philip Reed, Richard Denning	United States	
Wake of the Red Witch	Edward Ludwig	John Wayne, Gail Russell, Gig Young	United States	Sea adventure, romantic adventure
Yellow Sky	William A. Wellman	Gregory Peck, Richard Widmark, Anne Baxter	United States	Western

== 1949 ==
Title	Director	Cast	Country	Subgenre/Notes
Adventures of Sir Galahad	Spencer Gordon Bennet	George Reeves	United States	Serial
Africa Screams	Charles Barton	Bud Abbott, Lou Costello, Clyde Beatty, Frank Buck	United States	Adventure comedy
Arctic Fury	Norman Dawn, Fred R. Feitshans Jr.	Alfred Delcambre	United States	
Bagdad	Charles Lamont	Maureen O'Hara, Paul Hubschmid, Vincent Price	United States	Desert adventure
Barbary Pirate	Lew Landers	Donald Woods, Trudy Marshall	United States	
The Big Cat	Phil Karlson	Lon McCallister, Peggy Ann Garner, Preston Foster, Forrest Tucker	United States	
The Blue Lagoon	Frank Launder	Jean Simmons, Donald Houston	United Kingdom	Romantic adventure
Bomba, the Jungle Boy	Ford Beebe	Johnny Sheffield	United States	
Bomba 2: Bomba on Panther Island	Ford Beebe	Johnny Sheffield	United States	
The Bribe	Robert Z. Leonard	Robert Taylor, Ava Gardner, Charles Laughton, Vincent Price	United States	
A Connecticut Yankee in King Arthur's Court	Tay Garnett	Bing Crosby, Rhonda Fleming, Sir Cedric Hardwicke, William Bendix	United States	Fantasy adventure
Down to the Sea in Ships	Henry Hathaway	Richard Widmark, Lionel Barrymore, Dean Stockwell	United States	Sea adventure
The Duchess of Benameji	Luis Lucia	Amparo Rivelles, Jorge Mistral	Spain	
Il falco rosso	Carlo Ludovico Bragaglia	Jacques Sernas, Tamara Lees, Paul Muller	Italy	
The Fighting O'Flynn	Arthur Pierson	Douglas Fairbanks Jr., Helena Carter, Richard Greene, Patricia Medina	United States	
The Jack of Diamonds	Vernon Sewell	Nigel Patrick, Cyril Raymond, Joan Carroll	United Kingdom	Sea adventure
The Lost Tribe	William Berke	Johnny Weissmuller	United States	
Lust for Gold	S. Sylvan Simon	Glenn Ford, Ida Lupino, Gig Young	United States	Western
Malaya	Richard Thorpe	Spencer Tracy, James Stewart, Sydney Greenstreet	United States	
Malice in the Palace	Jules White	Moe Howard, Larry Fine, Shemp Howard	United States	
Mighty Joe Young	Ernest B. Schoedsack	Terry Moore, Ben Johnson, Robert Armstrong, Frank McHugh	United States	Jungle adventure
The Mutineers	Jean Yarbrough	Jon Hall, Adele Jergens, George Reeves	United States	
Outpost in Morocco	Robert Florey	George Raft, Marie Windsor, Akim Tamiroff	United States	
Le Paradis des pilotes perdus	Georges Lampin	Henri Vidal, Michel Auclair, Andrée Debar, Daniel Gélin	France	Desert adventure
The Pirates of Capri	Edgar G. Ulmer	Louis Hayward, Massimo Serato	United States; Italy	
Prince of Foxes	Henry King	Tyrone Power, Orson Welles	United States	
Reign of Terror	Anthony Mann	Robert Cummings, Arlene Dahl, Richard Basehart	United States	
Rope of Sand	William Dieterle	Burt Lancaster, Paul Henreid, Claude Rains, Peter Lorre	United States	Desert adventure
Rose of the Yukon	George Blair	Steve Brodie, Myrna Dell, William Wright	United States	
Samson and Delilah	Cecil B. DeMille	Hedy Lamarr, Victor Mature, George Sanders, Angela Lansbury, Henry Wilcoxon	United States	
The Secret of St. Ives	Phil Rosen	Richard Ney, Vanessa Brown, Henry Daniell	United States	
Sicilian uprising	Giorgio Pastina	Marina Berti, Clara Calamai, Roldano Lupi, Steve Barclay, Paul Muller	Italy	
Siren of Atlantis	Gregg G. Tallas	Maria Montez, Jean-Pierre Aumont, Dennis O'Keefe	United States	
Song of India	Albert S. Rogell	Sabu, Turhan Bey, Gail Russell	United States	
State Department: File 649	Sam Newfield	William Lundigan, Virginia Bruce	United States	
Sword in the Desert	George Sherman	Dana Andrews, Marta Toren, Stephen McNally	United States	War adventure
Tarzan's Magic Fountain	Lee Sholem	Lex Barker	United States	
The Walking Hills	John Sturges	Randolph Scott, Ella Raines, Arthur Kennedy, John Ireland	United States	Western
We Were Strangers	John Huston	Jennifer Jones, John Garfield, Pedro Armendáriz, Gilbert Roland, Ramon Novarro	United States	
William Tell	Giorgio Pastina, Michał Waszyński	Gino Cervi, Paul Muller	Italy	
Zamba	William Berke	Jon Hall	United States	
