= List of Italian films of 1940 =

A list of films produced in Italy under Fascist rule in 1940 (see 1940 in film):

Title	Director	Cast	Genre	Notes
1940
Abandonment	Mario Mattoli	Corinne Luchaire, George Rigaud, María Denis	Drama	
Alessandro, sei grande!				
Antonio Meucci	Enrico Guazzoni	Luigi Pavese, Leda Gloria, Nerio Bernardi	Historical	
Beyond Love	Carmine Gallone	Alida Valli, Amedeo Nazzari, Osvaldo Valenti	Historical	
Big Shoes	Dino Falconi	Amedeo Nazzari, Lilia Silvi, Elena Altieri	Comedy	
The Birth of Salome	Jean Choux	Conchita Montenegro, Armando Falconi, Nerio Bernardi	Comedy	Co-production with Spain
Boccaccio	Marcello Albani	Clara Calamai, Osvaldo Valenti	Musical	
Bridge of Glass	Goffredo Alessandrini	Isa Pola, Rossano Brazzi, Filippo Scelzo	Comedy	
The Cavalier from Kruja	Carlo Campogalliani	Doris Duranti, Antonio Centa	War	
The Daughter of the Green Pirate	Enrico Guazzoni	Doris Duranti, Fosco Giachetti	Adventure	
Eternal Melodies	Carmine Gallone	Gino Cervi, Conchita Montenegro	Historical	
The First Woman Who Passes	Max Neufeld	Alida Valli, Carlo Lombardi	Historical	
Goodbye Youth	Ferdinando Maria Poggioli	María Denis, Adriano Rimoldi	Drama	
The Hussar Captain	Sándor Szlatinay	Clara Tabody, Enrico Viarisio	Comedy	
Inspector Vargas	Gianni Franciolini	Giulio Donadio, Mariella Lotti	Comedy	Co-production with Spain
Kean	Guido Brignone	Rossano Brazzi, Germana Paolieri, Mariella Lotti	Historical	
Love Me, Alfredo!	Carmine Gallone	Maria Cebotari, Claudio Gora, Lucie Englisch	Drama	
Love Trap	Raffaello Matarazzo	Giuseppe Porelli, Carla Candiani, Claudio Gora	Comedy	
Lucrezia Borgia	Hans Hinrich	Isa Pola, Friedrich Benfer	Historical	
Maddalena, Zero for Conduct	Vittorio De Sica	Vittorio De Sica, Vera Bergman, Carla Del Poggio, Irasema Dilián	Drama	
Manon Lescaut	Carmine Gallone	Alida Valli, Vittorio De Sica, Lamberto Picasso	Historical	
One Hundred Thousand Dollars	Mario Camerini	Assia Noris, Amedeo Nazzari, Lauro Gazzolo	Comedy	
The Palace on the River	Alberto Salvi	Ferdinand Guillaume, Leda Gloria, Gildo Bocci	Comedy	
Red Roses	Vittorio De Sica, Giuseppe Amato	Vittorio De Sica, Renée Saint-Cyr	Comedy	De Sica's directorial debut
Red Tavern	Max Neufeld	Alida Valli, André Mattoni	Comedy	
A Romantic Adventure	Mario Camerini	Assia Noris, Gino Cervi, Leonardo Cortese	Historical drama	
The Secret of Villa Paradiso	Domenico Gambino	Luisa Ferida, Giovanni Grasso, Mino Doro	Crime	
The Siege of the Alcazar	Augusto Genina	Fosco Giachetti, Mireille Balin, Rafael Calvo	War	Best Italian Film Venice Film Festival
Then We'll Get a Divorce	Nunzio Malasomma	Amedeo Nazzari, Vivi Gioi, Lia Orlandini	Comedy	
The Thrill of the Skies	Giorgio Ferroni	Silvana Jachino, Mario Ferrari	War	
Two on a Vacation	Carlo Ludovico Bragaglia	Vittorio De Sica, María Denis	Comedy	
