= List of fantasy films of the 1940s =

A list of fantasy films released in the 1940s.

== List ==
Title	Director	Cast	Country	Notes
1940
The Blue Bird	Walter Lang	Shirley Temple, Spring Byington, Nigel Bruce	United States	
Fantasia	Various directors for Walt Disney		United States	Animated film
Mr. Bug Goes to Town	Dave Fleischer, Max Fleischer		United States	Animated film
One Million B.C.	Hal Roach	Victor Mature, Carole Landis, Lon Chaney, Jr.	United States	
Pinocchio	Various directors for Walt Disney		United States	Animated film
The Thief of Bagdad	Ludwig Berger, Michael Powell, Tim Whelan	Conrad Veidt, Sabu, June Duprez	United Kingdom	
1941
The Devil and Daniel Webster	William Dieterle	Edward Arnold, Walter Huston, James Craig	United States	
Dumbo	Various directors for Walt Disney		United States	Animated film
Here Comes Mr. Jordan	Alexander Hall	Robert Montgomery, Evelyn Keyes, Claude Rains	United States	
The Iron Crown	Alessandro Blasetti	Elisa Cegani, Luisa Ferida, Rina Morelli	Italy	
The Reluctant Dragon	Alfred L. Werker		United States	Animated film
1942
Bambi	Various directors for Walt Disney		United States	Animated film
Cat People	Jacques Tourneur		United States	Horror film
I Married a Witch	René Clair	Fredric March, Veronica Lake, Robert Benchley	United States	
Les Visiteurs du Soir	Marcel Carné	Arletty, Jules Berry, Marie Déa	France	
1943
A Guy Named Joe	Victor Fleming	Spencer Tracy, Irene Dunne, Van Johnson	United States	
Happy Land	Irving Pichel	Don Ameche, Frances Dee, Harry Carey	United States	
Heaven Can Wait	Ernst Lubitsch	Don Ameche, Gene Tierney, Charles Coburn	United States	
Münchhausen	Josef von Báky	Hans Albers, Brigitte Horney, Wilhelm Bendow	Germany	
1944
The Canterville Ghost	Jules Dassin	Charles Laughton, Robert Young, Margaret O'Brien	United States	
The Curse of the Cat People	Robert Wise	Simone Simon, Kent Smith, Jane Randolph	United States	
It Happened Tomorrow	René Clair	Dick Powell, Linda Darnell, Jack Oakie	United States	
Kashchey the Deathless	Alexander Rou	Sergei Stolyarov, Georgy Millyar	Soviet Union	
Kismet	William Dieterle	Ronald Colman, Marlene Dietrich, James Craig	United States	
Between Two Worlds	Edward A. Blatt	John Garfield, Sydney Greenstreet, Eleanor Parker	United States	
1945
Blithe Spirit	David Lean	Rex Harrison, Constance Cummings, Kay Hammond	United Kingdom	
The Enchanted Cottage	John Cromwell	Dorothy McGuire, Robert Young, Herbert Marshall	United States	
The Picture of Dorian Gray	Albert Lewin	George Sanders, Hurd Hatfield, Donna Reed	United States	
Sylvie et le fantôme (US Title: Sylvie and the Phantom)	Claude Autant-Lara	Odette Joyeux, Julien Carette, François Périer	France	
A Thousand and One Nights	Alfred E. Green	Cornel Wilde, Evelyn Keyes, Phil Silvers	United States	
Yolanda and the Thief	Vincente Minnelli	Fred Astaire, Lucille Bremer, Frank Morgan	United States	
1946
Angel on My Shoulder	Archie Mayo	Paul Muni, Anne Baxter, Claude Rains	United States	
Beauty and the Beast	Jean Cocteau	Josette Day, Jean Marais, Mila Parély	France	
A Matter of Life and Death	Michael Powell, Emeric Pressburger	David Niven, Kim Hunter, Marius Goring	United Kingdom	
Make Mine Music	Various directors for Walt Disney		United States	Animated film
The Stone Flower	Alexander Ptushko	Vladimir Druzhnikov, Tamara Makarova, Mikhail Troyanovsky	Soviet Union	
1947
The Bishop's Wife	Henry Koster	Cary Grant, Loretta Young, David Niven	United States	
Cinderella	Nadezhda Kosheverova, Mikhail Shapiro	Yanina Zheymo, Erast Garin, Faina Ranevskaya	Soviet Union	
Down to Earth	Alexander Hall	James Burke, Rita Hayworth, Larry Parks	United States	
The Ghost and Mrs. Muir	Joseph L. Mankiewicz	Gene Tierney, Rex Harrison, George Sanders	United States	
Heaven Only Knows		Robert Cummings, Brian Donlevy, Marjorie Reynolds	United States	
Miracle on 34th Street	George Seaton	Maureen O'Hara, John Payne, Edmund Gwenn	United States	
1948
Mr. Peabody and the Mermaid	Irving Pichel	Ann Blyth, William Powell, Irene Hervey	United States	
One Touch of Venus	William A. Seiter, Gregory La Cava	Ava Gardner, Robert Walker, Eve Arden	United States	
Portrait of Jennie	William Dieterle	Joseph Cotten, Jennifer Jones, Ethel Barrymore	United States	
Vice Versa	Peter Ustinov	Roger Livesey, Kay Walsh, Petula Clark	United Kingdom	
1949
The Adventures of Ichabod and Mr. Toad	James Algar, Clyde Geronimi, Jack Kinney for Walt Disney		United States	Animated film
A Connecticut Yankee in King Arthur's Court	Tay Garnett	Bing Crosby, Rhonda Fleming, Cedric Hardwicke	United States	
Alice in Wonderland	Dallas Bower, Lou Bunin	Stephen Murray, Carol Marsh, Raymond Bussières	France	
