= Francis the Smuggler =

1953 film by Gianfranco Parolini

Francis the English Smuggler
- Directed by: Gianfranco Parolini
- Written by: Umberto Fioravanti; Gianfranco Parolini
- Produced by: Domenico Gaetano
- Starring: Roberto Mauri; Doris Duranti; Vira Silenti
- Cinematography: Giorgio Orsini
- Edited by: Jenner Menghi
- Music by: Nestore Ricci
- Production companies: DG Film; Marte Film
- Release date: 6 October 1953
- Running time: 87 minutes
- Country: Italy
- Language: Italian

Francis the Smuggler (Italian: François il contrabbandiere) is a 1953 Italian drama film directed by Gianfranco Parolini and starring Roberto Mauri, Doris Duranti and Vira Silenti.

== Synopsis ==
With the police on his trail, a smuggler leaves town for a while. When he returns he falls in love with his boss' daughter, leading to an attempt to kill him.

== Cast ==
- Roberto Mauri as François
- Doris Duranti as Laila
- Vira Silenti as Silvia, figlia del conte
- Luigi Tosi as Topo
- Roberto Risso as Davide
- Peter Trent as Conte Paolo di Ronni
- Paola Borboni as Pamela, la governante
- Amedeo Trilli as Professore
- Gianna Baragli as Prostituta al bar del porto
- Manuel Serrano as Spagnolo
- Luigi Bracale as Faina
- Yami Kamadeva as Johnny
- Isarco Ravaioli as Marinaio al bar
- Arnaldo Arnaldi
- Ugo Urbino
- Mercello Jannone
- Raimondo Pennacchoni

== Bibliography ==
- Cristina Bragaglia. Il piacere del racconto: narrativa italiana e cinema, 1895–1990. Nuova Italia, 1993.
