= Passionate Song =

1953 film by Giorgio Simonelli

- Film poster
- Directed by: Giorgio Simonelli
- Written by: Manolo Bolognini; Gino De Santis; Jacques Rémy; Alberto Vecchietti; Luigi Zampa
- Produced by: Luigi Carpentieri; Ermanno Donati
- Starring: Nilla Pizzi; Gérard Landry; Vira Silenti
- Cinematography: Carlo Montuori
- Edited by: Elsa Dubbini
- Music by: Nino Oliviero
- Production company: Athena Cinematografica
- Distributed by: ENIC
- Release date: 20 November 1953
- Running time: 89 minutes
- Country: Italy
- Language: Italian

Passionate Song (Italian: Canzone appassionata) is a 1953 Italian musical melodrama film directed by Giorgio Simonelli and starring Nilla Pizzi, Gérard Landry and Vira Silenti.

== Plot ==
Lucia Spinelli, orphaned by both parents, is taken as a housekeeper in the house of Mrs. Carla Parodi, when she reaches the age of majority, the young woman is almost forced to marry Mrs. Carla's brother. After the marriage and the birth of the first child, Parodi's intrusions on the life of the two spouses continue. At the age of five, the little girl is sent to a college at Carla's suggestion, leaving Lucia in solitude, filled by the presence of Alberto, a shady individual who, after becoming her lover, pushes her to work as a singer in a nightclub. After leaving her husband, Lucia continues her work in the show that will take her around the world, but when she returns, after a few years, she will see her daughter again and will have the sad news about Alberto's attempts to take advantage of the young woman, in the dramatic final Lucia will kill Alberto.

== Cast ==
- Nilla Pizzi as Lucia Spinelli
- Gérard Landry as Albert Dupont
- Vira Silenti as Fiorella
- Cesare Fantoni as Lorenzo Parodi
- Elisa Cegani as Carla Parodi
- Umberto Spadaro as Il Commissario
- Carlo Tusco as Franco
- Paola Quattrini as Fiorella di Piccola
- France Degand as Blondie
- Gaetano Verna as Avv. del Divorzio
- Luisa Rivelli as Amante de Alberto
- Nino Cavalieri as Bernardini
- Zoe Incrocci as Prostituta alla Stazione
- Mario Passante as L'Impresario Vitale
- Giusi Raspani Dandolo as La Turista
- Guido Barbarisi as Lo Snob
- Bruno Cantalamessa as L'Algerino
- Umberto Aquilino as Compratore dei Gioielli
- Gigi Reder as Un Turista

== Bibliography ==
- Parish, James Robert . Film Actors Guide. Scarecrow Press, 1977.
