= Vira Silenti =

Italian actress (1931–2014)

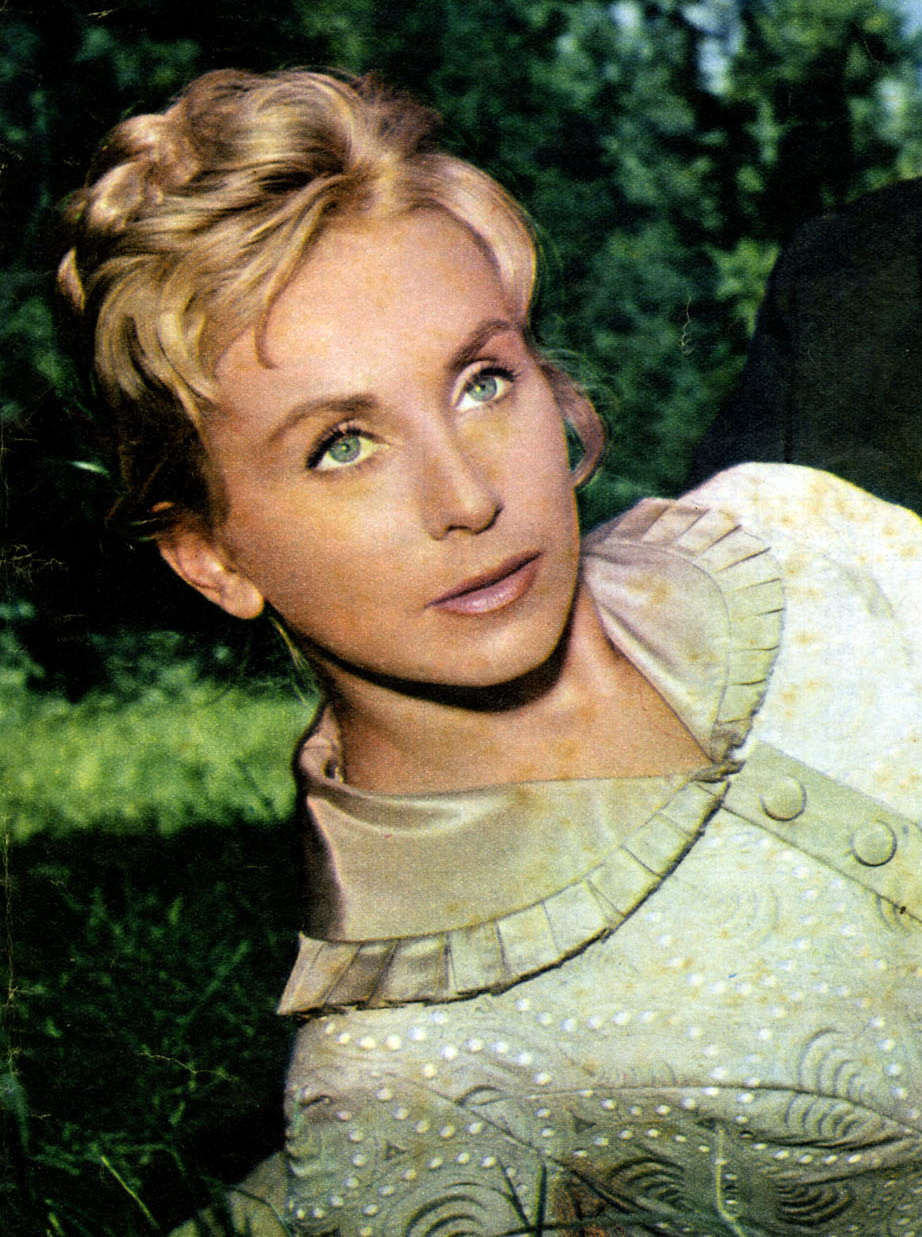
- Silenti in 1958
- Born: Elvira Giovene; 16 April 1931; Naples, Italy
- Died: 1 November 2014 (aged 83); Rome, Italy
- Occupation: Actress
- Years active: 1942–1994
- Spouse: Ermanno Donati (?-1979) (his death)

Vira Silenti (16 April 1931 – 1 November 2014) was an Italian actress.

== Career ==
Born in Naples as Elvira Giovene, Silenti debuted as child actress at ten years old in Una notte dopo l'opera (1942). She studied law at the university and enrolled at the dance school of Jia Ruskaja, then she left her studies to devote herself to the acting career. One of the most active actresses in the Italian television between fifties and sixties, she slowed her activity after her marriage with the film producer Ermanno Donati, until her retirement in the early 1980s.

== Death ==
Silenti was struck by a motorist on 31 October 2014 in Rome, Italy. She died the next day from her injuries at the age of 83.

== Selected filmography ==
- Last Love (1947)
- Cab Number 13 (1948)
- Totò Tarzan (1950)
- Romanzo d'amore (1950)
- The Enemy (1952)
- Francis the Smuggler (1953)
- Passionate Song (1953)
- I Vitelloni (1953)
- House of Ricordi (1954)
- Winter Holidays (1958)
- Son of the Red Corsair (1959)
- The Story of Joseph and His Brethren (1960)
- Son of Samson (1960)
- Atlas in the Land of the Cyclops (1961)
- The Witch's Curse (1962)
- The Avenger of Venice (1964)
- Col cuore in gola (1967)
