= The Hotel of the Absent =

1939 film

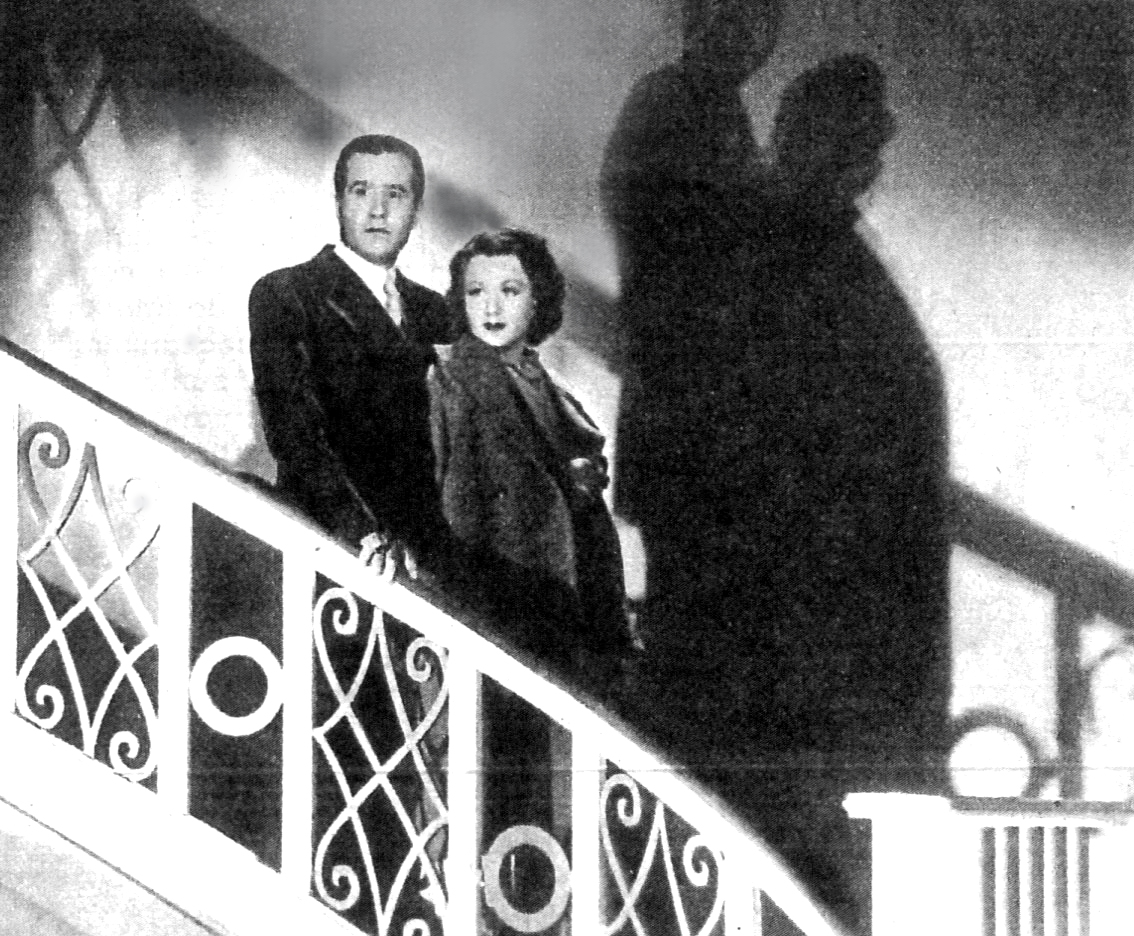
- Paola Barbara with Elio Steiner.
- Directed by: Raffaello Matarazzo
- Written by: Edoardo Anton; Michelangelo Barricelli; Raffaello Matarazzo
- Based on: The Hotel of the Absent by Michelangelo Barricelli
- Produced by: Arrigo Cava
- Starring: Paola Barbara; Carla Candiani; Camillo Pilotto
- Cinematography: Renato Del Frate
- Edited by: Vincenzo Zampi
- Music by: Umberto Mancini
- Production company: Oceano Film
- Distributed by: Artisti Associati
- Release date: May 1939
- Running time: 90 minutes
- Country: Italy
- Language: Italian

The Hotel of the Absent (Italian: L'albergo degli assenti) is a 1939 Italian mystery thriller film directed by Raffaello Matarazzo and starring Paola Barbara, Carla Candiani, and Camillo Pilotto. The film was shot at the Cinecittà Studios in Rome. Its sets were designed by art director Piero Filippone. The film is also known by the alternative title The Property of the Absent.

== Cast ==
- Paola Barbara as Renata
- Carla Candiani as Muriel Winnfield
- Camillo Pilotto as Laplace, il capo dei malviventi
- Maurizio D'Ancora as Il giovanetto galante
- Carlo Tamberlani as Marisol, l'ubriaco
- Dria Paola as La giovane innamorata
- Elio Steiner as Il giovane innamorato
- Franco Coop as Il commissario
- Guglielmo Barnabò as Il vice-commissario
- Pina Gallini as La prigioniera con gli occhiali
- Enzo Gainotti as Il capo cuoco
- Renato Chiantoni as Il signore distinto con il monoclo
- Dina Romano as Una cliente del "L'allegro forzato"
- Eugenio Duse as Gervasio, il prigioniero folle
- Alfredo Martinelli as Il marito tradito

== Bibliography ==
- Aprà, Adriano. The Fabulous Thirties: Italian cinema 1929-1944. Electa International, 1979.
- Curti, Roberto. Italian Giallo in Film and Television: A Critical History. McFarland, 2022.
