= List of thriller films of the 1940s =

A list of thriller films released in the 1940s.

Title	Director	Cast	Country	Subgenre/notes
1940
Before I Hang	Nick Grinde	Boris Karloff, Evelyn Keyes, Bruce Bennett	United States	
Foreign Correspondent	Alfred Hitchcock	Joel McCrea, Laraine Day	United States	
Gaslight	Thorold Dickinson	Anton Walbrook, Diana Wynyard, Frank Pettingell	United Kingdom	
Night Train to Munich	Carol Reed	Rex Harrison, Margaret Lockwood	United Kingdom	
Rebecca	Alfred Hitchcock	Laurence Olivier, Joan Fontaine, George Sanders, Judith Anderson	United States	Psychological thriller
Stranger on the Third Floor	Boris Ingster	Peter Lorre, John McGuire, Margaret Tallichet	United States	Psychological thriller
1941
Among the Living	Stuart Heisler	Albert Dekker, Susan Hayward, Harry Carey	United States	
Le Dernier des Six	Georges Lacombe	Michele Alfa, Pierre Fresnay, Jean Tissier	France	Psychological thriller
I Wake Up Screaming	H. Bruce Humberstone	Betty Grable, Victor Mature, Carole Landis	United States	
Man Hunt	Fritz Lang	Walter Pidgeon, Joan Bennett, George Sanders	United States	Political thriller
Shadow of the Thin Man	W.S. Van Dyke	William Powell, Myrna Loy, Barry Nelson	United States	Comedy thriller
Suspicion	Alfred Hitchcock	Cary Grant, Joan Fontaine	United States	Psychological thriller
1942
L'Assassin Habite au 21	Henri-Georges Clouzot	Suzy Delair, Pierre Fresnay, Noël Roquevert	France	Comedy thriller
Bowery at Midnight	Wallace W. Fox	Bela Lugosi, John Archer, Wanda McKay	United States	Crime thriller
Cat People	Jacques Tourneur	Simone Simon, Kent Smith, Tom Conway	United States	Supernatural thriller
Eyes in the Night	Fred Zinnemann	Edward Arnold, Ann Harding, Katherine Emery	United States	Crime thriller
The Glass Key	Stuart Heisler	Brian Donlevy, Veronica Lake, Alan Ladd	United States	
I Live on Danger	Sam White	Chester Morris, Jean Parker, Elizabeth Risdon	United States	
Nightmare	Tim Whelan	Diana Barrymore, Brian Donlevy, Henry Daniell	United States	
Saboteur	Alfred Hitchcock	Priscilla Lane, Robert Cummings, Norman Lloyd	United States	
This Gun for Hire	Frank Tuttle	Veronica Lake, Robert Preston, Laird Cregar	United States	Crime thriller
1943
Above Suspicion	Richard Thorpe	Joan Crawford, Fred MacMurray, Conrad Veidt	United States	Political thriller
Le Corbeau	Henri-Georges Clouzot	Pierre Fresnay, Pierre Larquey, Micheline Francey	France	Psychological thriller
The Fallen Sparrow	Richard Wallace	John Garfield, Maureen O'Hara, Walter Slezak	United States	
Journey into Fear	Norman Foster	Joseph Cotten, Dolores del Río, Ruth Warrick, Orson Welles	United States	
The Leopard Man	Jacques Tourneur	Dennis O'Keefe, Margo, Jean Brooks	United States	
Shadow of a Doubt	Alfred Hitchcock	Joseph Cotten, Teresa Wright, MacDonald Carey	United States	
1944
Bluebeard	Edgar G. Ulmer	John Carradine, Jean Parker, Nils Asther	United States	
The Climax	George Waggner	Boris Karloff, Susanna Foster	United States	
Dark Waters	André De Toth	Merle Oberon, Franchot Tone, Thomas Mitchell	United States	
Double Indemnity	Billy Wilder	Fred MacMurray, Barbara Stanwyck, Edward G. Robinson	United States	Crime thriller
Gaslight	George Cukor	Charles Boyer, Ingrid Bergman	United States	
Laura	Otto Preminger	Gene Tierney, Dana Andrews, Clifton Webb	United States	Psychological thriller
The Lodger	John Brahm	Merle Oberon, George Sanders, Laird Cregar	United States	
The Mask of Dimitrios	Jean Negulesco	Sydney Greenstreet, Zachary Scott, Faye Emerson	United States	
Ministry of Fear	Fritz Lang	Ray Milland, Marjorie Reynolds, Carl Esmond	United States	Psychological Thriller
Murder, My Sweet	Edward Dmytryk	Dick Powell, Claire Trevor, Anne Shirley	United States	
Phantom Lady	Robert Siodmak	Franchot Tone, Ella Raines, Alan Curtis	United States	
The Scarlet Claw	Roy William Neill	Basil Rathbone, Nigel Bruce, Gerald Hamer	United States	
The Thin Man Goes Home	Richard Thorpe	William Powell, Myrna Loy, Gloria DeHaven	United States	Comedy thriller
When Strangers Marry	William Castle	Dean Jagger, Kim Hunter, Robert Mitchum	United States	
The Woman in the Window	Fritz Lang	Edward G. Robinson, Joan Bennett, Raymond Massey	United States	
1945
The Body Snatcher	Robert Wise	Boris Karloff, Bela Lugosi, Henry Daniell	United States	
Conflict	Curtis Bernhardt	Humphrey Bogart, Alexis Smith, Sydney Greenstreet	United States	
Cornered	Edward Dmytryk	Dick Powell, Walter Slezak, Nina Vale	United States	
Dead of Night	Alberto Cavalcanti, Charles Crichton, Basil Dearden, Robert Hamer	Mervyn Johns, Michael Redgrave, Sally Ann Howes, Mary Merrall	United Kingdom	Psychological thriller
Hangover Square	John Brahm	Laird Cregar, Linda Darnell, George Sanders	United States	
The House on 92nd Street	Henry Hathaway	William Eythe, Lloyd Nolan, Signe Hasso	United States	
My Name Is Julia Ross	Joseph H. Lewis	Nina Foch, Dame May Whitty, George Macready	United States	
Spellbound	Alfred Hitchcock	Ingrid Bergman, Gregory Peck, Jean Acker	United States	Psychological thriller
Strange Illusion	Edgar G. Ulmer	Charles Arnt, Jameson Clark, Jimmy Clark	United States	
1946
Bedlam	Mark Robson	Boris Karloff, Anna Lee, Billy House	United States	
The Brute Man	Jean Yarbrough	Rondo Hatton, Jane Adams, Tom Neal	United States	
Crack-Up	Irving G. Reis	Pat O'Brien, Claire Trevor, Herbert Marshall	United States	Psychological thriller
Deadline at Dawn	Harold Clurman	Susan Hayward, Paul Lukas, Bill Williams	United States	
Dragonwyck	Joseph L. Mankiewicz	Gene Tierney, Spring Byington, Walter Huston	United States	
I See a Dark Stranger	Frank Launder	Deborah Kerr, Trevor Howard, Raymond Huntley	United Kingdom	
Leave Her to Heaven	John M. Stahl	Gene Tierney, Cornel Wilde	United States	Psychological thriller
Notorious	Alfred Hitchcock	Cary Grant, Ingrid Bergman, Claude Rains	United States	Political thriller
Shadow of a Woman	Joseph Santley	Helmut Dantine, Andrea King, Don McGuire	United States	
Shock	Alfred L. Werker	Vincent Price, Lynn Bari, Anabel Shaw	United States	
The Spiral Staircase	Robert Siodmak	Dorothy McGuire, George Brent, Ethel Barrymore	United States	Psychological thriller
The Stranger	Orson Welles	Orson Welles, Edward G. Robinson, Loretta Young	United States	Psychological thriller
1947
Kiss of Death	Henry Hathaway	Victor Mature, Brian Donlevy, Coleen Gray	United States	Psychological thriller, crime thriller
The Lady from Shanghai	Orson Welles	Rita Hayworth, Orson Welles	United States	
Love from a Stranger	Richard Whorf	John Hodiak, John Howard, Ann Richards	United States	
The Red House	Delmer Daves	Edward G. Robinson, Lon McCallister, Judith Anderson	United States	
Song of the Thin Man	Edward Buzzell	William Powell, Myrna Loy	United States	Comedy thriller
1948
The Big Clock	John Farrow	Ray Milland, Charles Laughton, Maureen O'Sullivan	United States	Psychological thriller
Cry of the City	Robert Siodmak	Victor Mature, Richard Conte, Fred Clark	United States	
He Walked by Night	Alfred L. Werker	Richard Basehart, Scott Brady, Roy Roberts	United States	
Key Largo	John Huston	Humphrey Bogart, Edward G. Robinson, Monte Blue	United States	Crime thriller
Sorry, Wrong Number	Anatole Litvak	Barbara Stanwyck, Burt Lancaster, Ann Richards	United States	Psychological thriller
1949
The Bribe	Robert Z. Leonard	Robert Taylor, Ava Gardner, Charles Laughton, Vincent Price	United States	Crime thriller
D.O.A.	Rudolph Maté	Edmond O'Brien, Pamela Britton, Luther Adler	United States	Psychological thriller
Follow Me Quietly	Richard Fleischer	William Lundigan, Dorothy Patrick, Jeff Corey	United States	
Gun Crazy	Joseph H. Lewis	Peggy Cummins, John Dall, Berry Kroeger	United States	Crime thriller
The Third Man	Carol Reed	Joseph Cotten, Alida Valli, Orson Welles	United Kingdom	Psychological thriller
Stray Dog	Akira Kurosawa	Toshirō Mifune, Takashi Shimura	Japan	
White Heat	Raoul Walsh	James Cagney	United States	Crime thriller
Whirlpool	Otto Preminger	Gene Tierney, Richard Conte, Jose Ferrer	United States	Psychological thriller
