= Stramilano (film) =

1929 film by Corrado D'Errico

- Directed by: Corrado D'Errico
- Release date: 1929
- Country: Italy
- Language: Silent

Stramilano is a 1929 short film directed by Corrado D'Errico and produced by the company of the Za Bum music hall of Teatro Excelsior by Mario Mattoli and Luciano Ramo for Istituto Luce, a fascist government created organisation. The film marked Italy's first contribution to the city symphonies cycle and was the earliest example of such a film to emerge from a fascist nation.

== Overview ==
Stramilano, which can be translated to "ultra Milan" or "super Milan", is composed of two parts and depicts the city of Milan: factories, transportation (trains, cars, and carriages), people working, living, and socialising in the city. The film was produced and distributed during the time of Italy's fascist regime (1922–1943). The film was supposed to demonstrate the modernity and industrialization or urban life. Much of the film was showing off the rayon factory and its product. The regime had the goal of making educational film that illustrated the link between film and politics. However, the organisation was more concerned with newsreels and less about commercial films.
