= List of science fiction films of the 1940s =

A list of science fiction films released in the 1940s. These 45 films include core elements of science fiction and are widely distributed with reviews by reputable critics.

== List ==
1940
Title	Director	Cast	Country	Subgenre/Notes
The Ape	William Nigh	Boris Karloff, Maris Wrixon, Gene O'Donnell	United States	horror
Before I Hang	Nick Grinde	Boris Karloff, Evelyn Keyes, Bruce Bennett	United States	horror
Black Friday	Arthur Lubin	Boris Karloff, Bela Lugosi, Stanley Ridges,	United States	horror
The Devil Bat	Jean Yarborough	Bela Lugosi	United States	
Dr. Cyclops	Ernest B. Schoedsack	Albert Dekker, Janice Logan, Thomas Coley	United States	
Flash Gordon Conquers the Universe	Ford I. Beebe, Ray Taylor	Harry C. Bradley, Larry "Buster" Crabbe, Shirley Deane	United States	Serial film
The Invisible Man Returns	Joe May	Cedric Hardwicke, Vincent Price, Nan Grey, John Sutton	United States	
The Invisible Woman	Edward Sutherland	Virginia Bruce, John Barrymore, John Howard, Charlie Ruggles	United States	
Mysterious Doctor Satan	Jon English, William Witney	Edwin Stanley, C. Montague Shaw	United States	Serial film
Son of Ingagi	Richard Kahn	Zack Williams, Laura Bowman, Spencer Williams	United States	
Weltraumschiff 1 startet ... (i.e. Spaceship I takes off)	Anton Kutter	Carl Wery, Fritz Reiff, Rolf Wernicke	Nazi Germany	
1941
Title	Director	Cast	Country	Subgenre/Notes
The Devil Commands	Edward Dmytryk	Boris Karloff, Richard Fiske, Amanda Duff, Anne Revere	United States	
Dr. Jekyll and Mr. Hyde	Victor Fleming	Spencer Tracy, Ingrid Bergman, Lana Turner, Donald Crisp	United States	
Tainstvennyy ostrov (Mysterious Island)	Eduard Penclin	Alexej Krasnopolsky, Pavel Kiyansky, Nikolai Komissarov, Yuri Grammatikati, Andrey Andriyenko-Zemskov	Soviet Union	adaptation of the 1874 novel by Jules Verne
Man Made Monster	George Waggner	Lionel Atwill, Lon Chaney Jr., Anne Nagel, Frank Albertson	United States	
The Monster and the Girl	Stuart Heisler	Ellen Drew, Robert Paige, Paul Lukas	United States	
1942
Title	Director	Cast	Country	Subgenre/Notes
Bowery at Midnight	Wallace W. Fox	Bela Lugosi, John Archer	United States	
The Corpse Vanishes	Wallace W. Fox	Bela Lugosi, Luana Walters, Tristram Coffin, Elizabeth Russell	United States	
Dr. Renault's Secret	Harry Lachman	J. Carrol Naish, John Shepperd, Lynne Roberts	United States	
Invisible Agent	Edwin L. Marin	Ilona Massey, Jon Hall, Peter Lorre, Cedric Hardwicke	United States	
The Mad Monster	Sam Newfield	Johnny Downs, George Zucco, Anne Nagel, Reginald Barlow	United States	
1943
Title	Director	Cast	Country	Subgenre/Notes
The Ape Man	William Beaudine	Bela Lugosi, Wallace Ford, Louise Currie	United States	
The Mad Ghoul	James Hogan	David Bruce, Evelyn Ankers, George Zucco	United States	
1944
Title	Director	Cast	Country	Subgenre/Notes
The Invisible Man's Revenge	Ford Beebe	Jon Hall, John Carradine, Evelyn Ankers	United States	
The Lady and the Monster	George Sherman	Vera Ralston, Richard Arlen, Mary Nash, Sidney Blackmer	United States	
The Monster Maker	Sam Newfield	J. Carrol Naish, Ralph Morgan, Tala Birell	United States	
1945
Title	Director	Cast	Country	Subgenre/Notes
Manhunt of Mystery Island	Spencer Gordon Bennet, Yakima Canutt, Wallace A. Grissell	Linda Stirling, Harry Strang, Tom Steele	United States	Serial film
The Man in Half Moon Street	Ralph Murphy	Nils Asther, Helen Walker	United States	
The Monster and the Ape	Howard Bretherton	Robert Lowery, Ralph Morgan, George Macready	United States	Serial film
The Purple Monster Strikes	Spencer Gordon Bennet, Fred C. Brannon	Linda Stirling, Ken Terrell, Mary Moore	United States	Serial film
Strange Holiday	Arch Oboler	Griff Barnett, Claude Rains, Barbara Bates, Tommy Cook, Paul Hilton	United States	
1946
Title	Director	Cast	Country	Subgenre/Notes
The Crimson Ghost	Fred C. Brannon, William Witney	Forrest Taylor, Dale Van Sickel, Linda Stirling, Charles Quigley	United States	Serial film
The Flying Serpent	Sam Newfield	George Zucco, Ralph Lewis, Hope Kramer	United States	Mad scientist
The Mysterious Mr. M	Lewis D. Collins, Vernon Keays	Richard Martin, Pamela Blake, Dennis Moore	United States	Serial film
1947
Title	Director	Cast	Country	Subgenre/Notes
The Black Widow	Spencer Gordon Bennet, Fred C. Brannon	Bruce Edwards, Virginia Lee, Carol Forman, Anthony Warde	United States	Serial film
Brick Bradford	Spencer Gordon Bennet, Thomas Carr	Kane Richmond, Rick Vallin	United States	Serial film
Jack Armstrong	Wallace Fox	John Hart, Pierre Watkin	United States	Serial film
1948
Title	Director	Cast	Country	Subgenre/Notes
Chemistry and Love	Arthur Maria Rabenalt	Hans Nielsen, Tilly Lauenstein, Ralph Lothar	East Germany	Comedy
Counterblast	Paul L. Stein	Mervyn Johns, Robert Beatty, Nova Pilbeam	United Kingdom	
Krakatit	Otakar Vávra	Karel Höger	Czechoslovakia	
Unknown Island	Jack Bernhard	Virginia Grey, Richard Denning, Barton MacLane	United States	
1949
Title	Director	Cast	Country	Subgenre/Notes
Bruce Gentry	Spencer Gordon Bennet, Thomas Carr	Tom Neal	United States	Serial film
King of the Rocket Men	Fred C. Brannon	Tristram Coffin, Mae Clarke	United States	Serial film
Mighty Joe Young	Ernest B. Schoedsack	Terry Moore, Ben Johnson, Robert Armstrong	United States	
The Perfect Woman	Bernard Knowles	Patricia Roc, Stanley Holloway, Nigel Patrick	United Kingdom	

== See also ==
- History of science fiction films
- List of film serials
