= Guido Barbarisi =

Italian actor (1889–1960)

- Born: 26 January 1889; Rome, Lazio, Italy
- Died: 16 January 1960 (aged 70); Rome, Lazio, Italy
- Occupation: Actor
- Years active: 1935-1956 (film)

Guido Barbarisi (1889–1960) was an Italian stage and film actor.

== Selected filmography ==
- Golden Arrow (1935)
- The Former Mattia Pascal (1937)
- Who Are You? (1939)
- Two Million for a Smile (1939)
- Annabella's Adventure (1943)
- Adam and Eve (1949)
- Passionate Song (1953)
- Beatrice Cenci (1956)

== Bibliography ==
- Mancini, Elaine. Struggles of the Italian film industry during fascism, 1930-1935. UMI Research Press, 1985.
