= Black Gold (1942 film) =

1942 Italian film

- Directed by: Enrico Guazzoni; Camillo Mastrocinque
- Written by: Silvano Castellani; Pietro Lissia; Amleto Palermi
- Produced by: Guido Paolucci
- Starring: Juan de Landa; Carla Candiani; Piero Pastore
- Cinematography: Giuseppe La Torre
- Edited by: Ines Donarelli
- Music by: Alberto Paoletti
- Production company: Fono Roma
- Distributed by: Consorzio EIA
- Release date: 19 March 1942
- Running time: 85 minutes
- Country: Italy
- Language: Italian

Black Gold (Italian: Oro nero) is a 1942 Italian drama film directed by Enrico Guazzoni and Camillo Mastrocinque and starring Juan de Landa, Carla Candiani and Piero Pastore. It was shot at the Cinecittà Studios in Rome and the Pisorno Studios in Tirrenia. The film's sets were designed by the art director Ivo Battelli.

== Cast ==
- Juan de Landa as Pietro, il minatore
- Carla Candiani as Grazia
- Piero Pastore as Marco, il marinaio
- Friedrich Benfer as Nicola
- Mara Landi as Marta
- Giuseppe Rinaldi as Carlo Marini
- Elena Altieri as La collega di Marta
- Maria Vittoria Guerra as Marta da bambina
- Giulio Battiferri as Il galante corteggiatore di Grazia

== Bibliography ==
- Scaglione, Massimo. I divi del ventennio: per vincere ci vogliono i leoni--. Lindau, 2005
- Urban, Maria Bonaria. Sardinia on Screen: The Construction of the Sardinian Character in Italian Cinema. Rodopi, 2013.
