= Golden Arrow (1935 film) =

1935 film

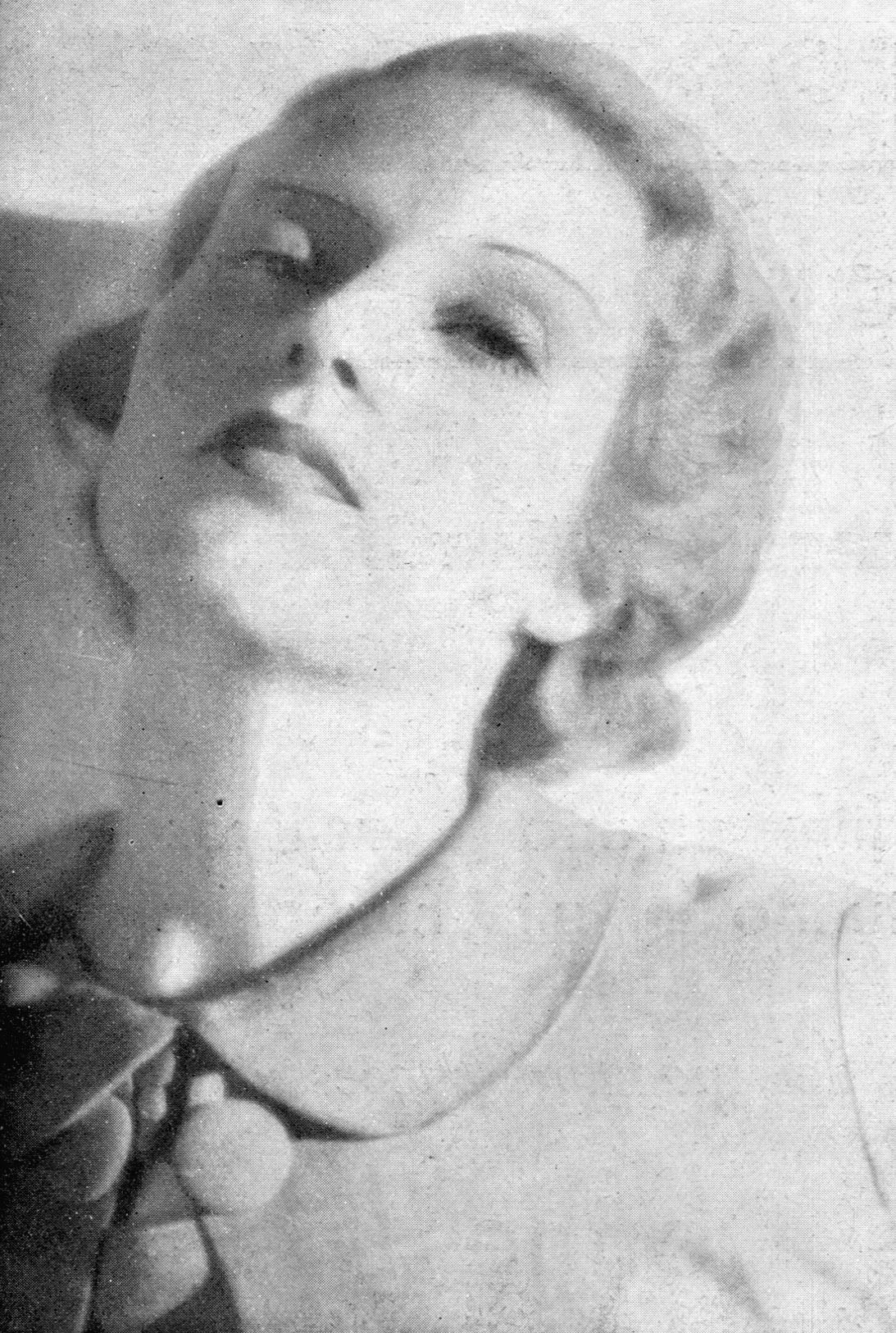
- Image of Nane Chaubert during the shooting of the film.
- Directed by: Piero Ballerini; Corrado D'Errico
- Written by: Piero Ballerini
- Starring: Luisa Ferida; Guido Barbarisi; Ennio Cerlesi
- Cinematography: Carlo Montuori; Piero Pupilli
- Edited by: Giorgio Simonelli
- Music by: Paolo Salviucci
- Production companies: Ala Film; Colosseum Film
- Distributed by: Colosseum Film
- Release date: 1935
- Running time: 61 minutes
- Country: Italy
- Language: Italian

Golden Arrow (Italian: Freccia d'oro) is a 1935 Italian crime film directed by Piero Ballerini and Corrado D'Errico and starring Luisa Ferida, Guido Barbarisi and Ennio Cerlesi. It was screened at the 1935 Venice Film Festival.

It was shot at the Cines Studios in Rome. The film's sets were designed by Gastone Medin.

== Cast ==
- Luisa Ferida as Evelyn - daughter of Sleiden
- Guido Barbarisi as Weitzmuller - the jeweller
- Ennio Cerlesi as Conte Claudio Arden
- Maurizio D'Ancora as Ted Wall
- Emma Baron as Contessa Sonia Larman
- Laura Nucci as Lilly Jorgen
- Luigi Pavese as Ellis - the ambassador
- Augusto Marcacci as Sleiden - president of the Banca Generale
- Enzo Gainotti as Mr. Morgan
- Vanna Vanni as Dora Morgan
- Giorgio Piamonti as first thief
- Bruno Smith as second thief
- Giorgio Capecchi as train head waiter
- Nane Chaubert as foreign girl on the train
- Cesare Polacco as Casellante station master
- Giovanni Bellini as the engine driver
- Eva Magni as Maria - the engine driver's fiancée
- Adele Garavaglia as the engine driver's mother
- Mirella Giordani as the little girl
- Alfredo Menichelli as the little girl's father
- Mario Brizzolari
- Ernesto Calindri
- Dino Cardinali
- Gustavo Conforti
- Rocco D'Assunta
- Giovanni Dal Cortivo
- Doris Duranti
- Eugenio Duse
- Fernando Simbolotti
- Vittorio Tettoni

== Bibliography ==
- Mancini, Elaine (1985). Struggles of the Italian film industry during fascism, 1930-1935. Ann Arbor, Mich: UMI Research Press. p. 234. ISBN 978-0-8357-1655-0. OCLC 11783404.
