= Captain Tempest =

1942 film

- Directed by: Corrado D'Errico
- Written by: Alessandro De Stefani; Omar Salgari
- Based on: Captain Tempesta by Emilio Salgari
- Produced by: Franco Magli
- Starring: Doris Duranti; Dina Sassoli; Carlo Ninchi
- Cinematography: Massimo Terzano; Otello Martelli
- Edited by: Eraldo Da Roma
- Music by: Amedeo Escobar
- Production company: Scalera Film
- Distributed by: Scalera Film; CIFESA
- Release date: 28 January 1942
- Running time: 85 minutes
- Countries: Italy; Spain
- Language: Italian

Captain Tempest (Italian: Capitan Tempesta) is a 1942 Italian-Spanish historical adventure film directed by Corrado D'Errico and starring Doris Duranti, Dina Sassoli and Carlo Ninchi. It is an adaptation of the 1905 novel of the same title by Emilio Salgari set during the Ottoman–Venetian War. It was shot at the Scalera Studios in Rome. The film's sets were designed by the art directors Gustav Abel and Amleto Bonetti. It was followed by a sequel The Lion of Damascus the same year.

== Synopsis ==
During the 1571 Siege of Famagusta the city is staunchly defended by Leonora, the daughter of the governor. She manages to infiltrate the fortress of the besieging army where Venetian prisoners including her fiancée Marcello are being tortured under the control of the villainess Haradia.

== Cast ==
- Doris Duranti as Haradia
- Dina Sassoli as Suleika
- Carla Candiani as Leonora Bragadin - Capitan Tempesta
- Carlo Ninchi as Moulia El Kader - il 'Leone di Damasco'
- Adriano Rimoldi as Marcello Corner
- Annibale Betrone as Marcantonio Bragadin
- Rafael Rivelles as Lachinsky
- Erminio Spalla as El Kadur
- Nicolás D. Perchicot as Alì Pascià
- Carlo Duse as Methiub
- Juan Calvo as Hussif
- Giulio Battiferri as Mustafà

== Bibliography ==
- Curti, Roberto. Riccardo Freda: The Life and Works of a Born Filmmaker. McFarland, 2017.
- De Pau, Daniela & Torello, Georgina (ed.) Watching Pages, Reading Pictures: Cinema and Modern Literature in Italy. Cambridge Scholars Publishing, 2008.
