= Corrado D'Errico =

Italian screenwriter and film director (1902–1941)

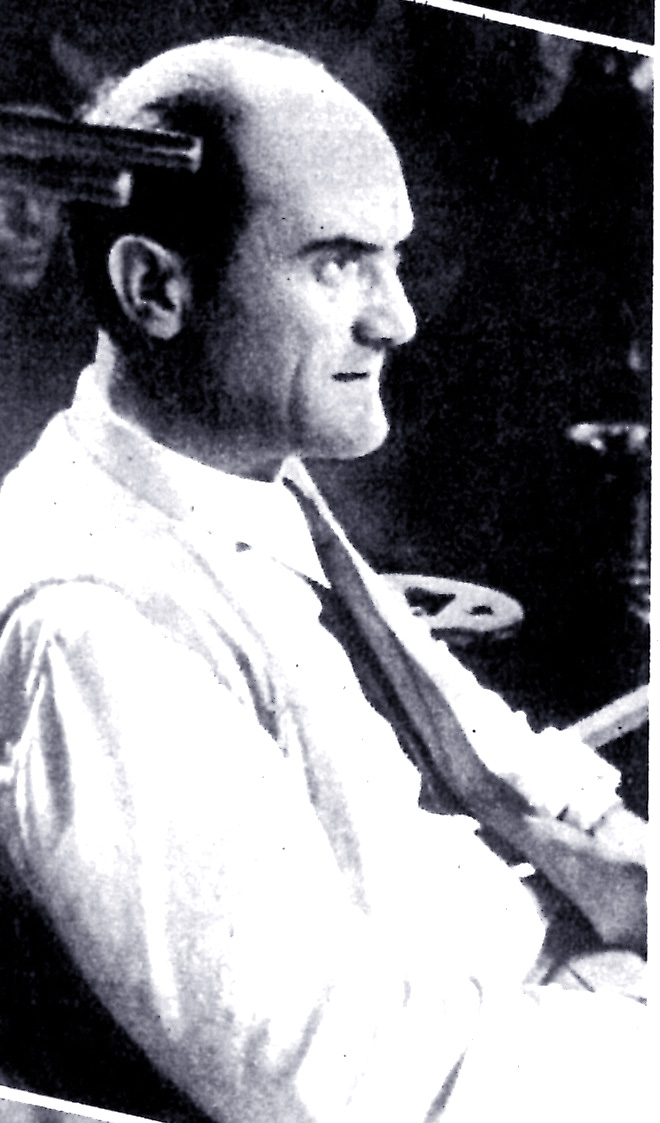
- D'Errico in 1937
- Born: 19 May 1902; Rome, Kingdom of Italy
- Died: 3 September 1941 (aged 39); Rome, Italy
- Occupations: Director; screenwriter
- Years active: 1928–1941

Corrado D'Errico (1902–1941) was an Italian screenwriter and film director. D'Errico was one of a number of directors in the Fascist era to graduate from the Istituto Luce.

Corrando D’Errico came into the public eye at the end of the 1920s as a creator of experimental plays and city symphonies that employ a futurist and fascist mentality. Throughout his career, D'Errico directed 11 feature-length films across the adventure, comedy, and neorealist drama genres. Beyond his work as a filmmaker, D’Errico was a journalist for a fascist newspaper and was well connected with many of the party's high profile officials. His party connections allowed him take a role within the State secretary of Press and Propaganda as a member of Mussolini’s press office.

== Selected filmography ==
=== Director ===
- Stramilano (1929), short
- Ritmi di stazione (1933), short
- Golden Arrow (1935)
- La Gazza Ladra (1934), short
- The Castiglioni Brothers (1937)
- All of Life in One Night (1938)
- Star of the Sea (1938)
- Diamonds (1939)
- Trial and Death of Socrates (1939)
- Captain Tempest (1942)
- The Lion of Damascus (1942)

=== Screenwriter ===
- Rails (1929)
- Aldebaran (1937)
- The Faceless Voice (1939)

== Bibliography ==
- Brunetta, Gian Piero. The History of Italian Cinema: A Guide to Italian Film from Its Origins to the Twenty-first Century. Princeton University Press, 2009.
