= Love Trap (1940 film) =

1940 film

- Directed by: Raffaello Matarazzo
- Written by: Paul Armont (play); Marcel Gerbidon (play); Jean Manoussi (play); Alessandro De Stefani; Raffaello Matarazzo
- Produced by: Arrigo Cava
- Starring: Giuseppe Porelli; Carla Candiani; Claudio Gora
- Cinematography: Carlo Montuori
- Edited by: Vincenzo Zampi
- Music by: Umberto Mancini
- Production company: Oceano Film
- Distributed by: Generalcine
- Release date: April 1940
- Running time: 80 minutes
- Country: Italy
- Language: Italian

Love Trap (Italian: Trappola d'amore) is a 1940 Italian comedy film directed by Raffaello Matarazzo and starring Giuseppe Porelli, Carla Candiani and Claudio Gora. It was shot at the Cinecittà Studios in Rome. The film's sets were designed by the art director Paolo Volta.

== Cast ==
- Giuseppe Porelli as Il lord
- Carla Candiani as La segretaria del lord
- Claudio Gora as Il fidanzato della segretaria
- Paolo Stoppa as Il finto poliziotto
- Lia Orlandini as La moglie del lord
- Loretta Vinci as La figlia del lord
- Osvaldo Valenti as Il conte di Brazeuil

== Bibliography ==
- Aprà, Adriano. The Fabulous Thirties: Italian cinema 1929-1944. Electa International, 1979.
- Curti, Roberto. Italian Giallo in Film and Television: A Critical History. McFarland, 2022.
