= List of German films of 1940 =

This is a list of the most notable films produced in the Cinema of Germany in 1940.

== A–L ==
Title	Director	Cast	Genre	Notes
Aberglaube	Walter Ruttmann		documentary	
Achtung! Feind hört mit!	Arthur Maria Rabenalt	Kirsten Heiberg, Rolf Weih, Rene Deltgen, Lotte Koch		Beware! The Enemy Is Listening!
Beloved Augustin	E. W. Emo	Paul Hörbiger, Hilde Weissner	Historical	
Between Hamburg and Haiti	Erich Waschneck	Gustav Knuth, Gisela Uhlen	Drama	
Bismarck	Wolfgang Liebeneiner	Paul Hartmann, Lil Dagover	Historical	
Baumeisterin Chemie	Hans Schipulle		Short Documentary	17 minutes
Clothes Make the Man	Helmut Käutner	Heinz Rühmann, Hertha Feiler	Comedy	
Commissioner Eyck	Milo Harbich	Anneliese Uhlig, Paul Klinger, Herbert Wilk	Crime	
Counterfeiters	Hermann Pfeiffer	Kirsten Heiberg, Rudolf Fernau, Karin Himboldt	Crime	
Deutsche Arbeitsstätten	Svend Noldan		documentary	German Work Places; 10 min
Deutsche Frontflugzeuge	E.K. Beltzig		documentary	German Front aircraft
Deutsche Panzer	Walter Ruttmann		documentary	German Tanks
Deutsche Waffenschmieden	Walter Ruttmann		documentary	German Weaponry
Der Ewige Jude	Fritz Hippler			The Eternal Jew; antisemitic documentary propaganda film
The Eternal Spring	Fritz Kirchhoff	Eugen Klöpfer, Bernhard Minetti, Lina Carstens	Drama	
Fahrt ins Leben	Bernd Hofmann			Journey Into Life; Nazi film about 3 Merchant navy cadets.
Feinde	Viktor Tourjansky			Enemies; Film justifying the German Invasion of Poland
Falstaff in Vienna	Leopold Hainisch	Hans Nielsen, Gusti Wolf, Wolf Albach-Retty	Musical comedy	
Feldzug in Polen	Fritz Hippler			Campaign in Poland; documentary propaganda film about the 1939 invasion of Poland
Feuertaufe			documentary	Baptism by Fire; propaganda film about Luftwaffe in the 1939 invasion of Poland
The Fire Devil	Luis Trenker	Luis Trenker, Judith Holzmeister, Hilde von Stolz	Adventure	
Friedrich Schiller – Der Triumph eines Genies	Herbert Maisch			Friedrich Schiller – the Triumph of a Genius
The Fox of Glenarvon	Max W. Kimmich	Olga Chekhova, Karl Ludwig Diehl, Ferdinand Marian, Elisabeth Flickenschildt,	Thriller	Pro-Irish film.
Der gestiefelte Kater	Ferdinand Diehl		animation	
The Girl at the Reception	Gerhard Lamprecht	Magda Schneider, Richard Häussler	Drama	
The Girl from Barnhelm	Hans Schweikart	Käthe Gold, Ewald Balser	Historical comedy	
Helfende Hände	Kurt Rupli			
Her Private Secretary	Charles Klein	Gustav Fröhlich, Fita Benkhoff, Theo Lingen	Comedy	
Das Herz der Königin	Carl Froelich			The Heart of the Queen starring Zarah Leander as Mary, Queen of Scots
Indianer	Ernst R. Müller and Gerd Philipp		Documentary	Indians
Jud Süß	Veit Harlan			The Jew Suss; dramatic anti-Semitic propaganda film
Judgement Day	Franz Seitz	Hans Holt, Olly Holzmann, Susi Nicoletti	Comedy	
Kampf um Norwegen – Feldzug 1940	Martin Rikli		documentary	Battle for Norway – 1940 campaign; propaganda film about the Norwegian Campaign
Kanarienvögel	Wolfram Junghans, Ulrich K.T. Schultz			
Karikatur 1	Louis Steel		animation	
Kora Terry	Georg Jacoby			

== M–Z ==
Title	Director	Cast	Genre	Notes
A Man Astray	Herbert Selpin	Hans Albers, Charlotte Thiele, Hilde Weissner	Adventure	
Der Marsch zum Führer	Unknown		documentary	The March to the Führer; propaganda film about Hitler Youth March to Nazi Party Congress
My Daughter Doesn't Do That	Hans H. Zerlett	Ralph Arthur Roberts, Erika von Thellmann	Comedy	
Nanette	Erich Engel	Jenny Jugo, Hans Söhnker	Musical	
Nightclub Hostess	Albert Valentin	Michèle Morgan		L'Entraîneuse; French-language film
Operette	Willi Forst, Karl Hartl and Robert Naestelberger			
Ostraum - Deutscher Raum	Werner Buhre			
Our Miss Doctor	Erich Engel	Jenny Jugo		Unser Fräulein Doktor
Passion	Walter Janssen	Olga Chekhova, Hans Stüwe, Hilde Körber	Drama	
Der Postmeister	Gustav Ucicky			The Postmaster
Ein Robinson	Arnold Fanck			
Roses in Tyrol	Géza von Bolváry	Marte Harell, Johannes Heesters	Musical comedy	
Die Rothschilds	Erich Waschneck			The Rothschilds; anti-semitic dramatic propaganda film
Rumpelstiltskin	Alf Zengerling	Paul Walker, Hermann Schröder		
Die Schwarze Kunst des Johannes Gutenberg	Kurt Rupli			
Seven Years Hard Luck	Ernst Marischka	Hans Moser, Wolf Albach-Retty	Comedy	
The Sinful Village	Joe Stöckel	Joe Stöckel, Elise Aulinger	Comedy	
Small Town Poet	Josef von Báky	Paul Kemp, Hilde Schneider, Georg Alexander	Comedy	
The Star of Rio	Karl Anton	La Jana, Gustav Diessl	Comedy thriller	
Der Störenfried	Hans Held		animation	
The Three Codonas	Arthur Maria Rabenalt	René Deltgen, Annelies Reinhold	Drama	
Tierparadies Südamerika	Werner Buhre and K. Krieg		Documentary	Animal Paradise South America; 66 minutes in length.
Trenck the Pandur	Herbert Selpin	Hans Albers, Käthe Dorsch, Sybille Schmitz	Historical adventure	
Two Worlds	Gustaf Gründgens	Marianne Simson, Antje Weisgerber, Max Eckard	Drama	
Verwandte sind auch Menschen	Hans Deppe	Fritz Klaudius, Heinz Salfner, Else von Möllendorff,		Relatives Are People Too.
Unsere Jungen - Ein Film der nationalpolitschen Erziehungsanstalten	Johannes Häussler			
Vom Bäumlein, das andere Blätter hat gewollt	Heinz Tischmeyer		animation	Propaganda
The Vulture Wally	Hans Steinhoff	Heidemarie Hatheyer, Sepp Rist	Drama	
Woman Made to Measure	Helmut Käutner	Hans Söhnker, Dorit Kreysler	Comedy	
Wunschkonzert	Eduard von Borsody	Ilse Werner, Carl Raddatz		Request Concert; musical romance set at the 1936 Summer Olympics
