= The Lion of Damascus =

1942 film by Corrado D'Errico and Enrico Guazzoni

- Directed by: Corrado D'Errico; Enrico Guazzoni
- Written by: Alessandro De Stefani; Omar Salgari
- Based on: The Lion of Damascus by Emilio Salgari
- Produced by: Franco Magli
- Starring: Carla Candiani; Doris Duranti; Carlo Ninchi
- Cinematography: Massimo Terzano; Sergio Pesce
- Edited by: Eraldo Da Roma
- Music by: Amedeo Escobar
- Production company: Scalera Film
- Distributed by: Scalera Film; CIFESA
- Release date: 31 March 1942
- Running time: 85 minutes
- Countries: Italy; Spain
- Language: Italian

The Lion of Damascus (Italian: Il leone di Damasco) is a 1942 Italian-Spanish historical adventure film directed by Corrado D'Errico and Enrico Guazzoni and starring Carla Candiani, Doris Duranti and Carlo Ninchi. It is based on the 1910 novel of the same title by Emilio Salgari and is a sequel to the film Captain Tempest released earlier the same year. It was shot at the Scalera Studios in Rome. The film's sets were designed by the art directors Gustav Abel and Amleto Bonetti. The film was begun under the direction of D'Errico but completed by Guazzoni following his death. A separate Spanish-language version El león de Damasco was also produced.

== Synopsis ==
In 1571 during the Ottoman–Venetian War, an Allied fleet is sailing to relieve besieged city of Famagusta. Its commander's young son is kidnapped and will only be freed if the city surrenders. A Turkish captain, known as the Lion of Damascus - is disgusted by this and changes sides and assists the rescue of the child. The allies win a major victory at the Battle of Lepanto.

== Cast ==
- Carla Candiani as Leonora Bragadin - Capitan Tempesta
- Doris Duranti as Haradia
- Carlo Ninchi as Moulia El Kader - Il 'leone di Damasco'
- Dina Sassoli as Suleika
- Adriano Rimoldi as Marcello Corner
- Erminio Spalla as El Kadur
- Nicolás D. Perchicot as Alì Pascià
- Annibale Betrone as Marcantonio Bragadin
- Carlo Duse as Methioub
- Giulio Battiferri as Mustafà
- Rafael Rivelles as Lachinsky
- Pina Piovani as Una schiava di Haradia

== Bibliography ==
- Curti, Roberto. Riccardo Freda: The Life and Works of a Born Filmmaker. McFarland, 2017.
- De Pau, Daniela & Torello, Georgina (ed.) Watching Pages, Reading Pictures: Cinema and Modern Literature in Italy. Cambridge Scholars Publishing, 2008.
