= Carla Candiani =

Italian actress

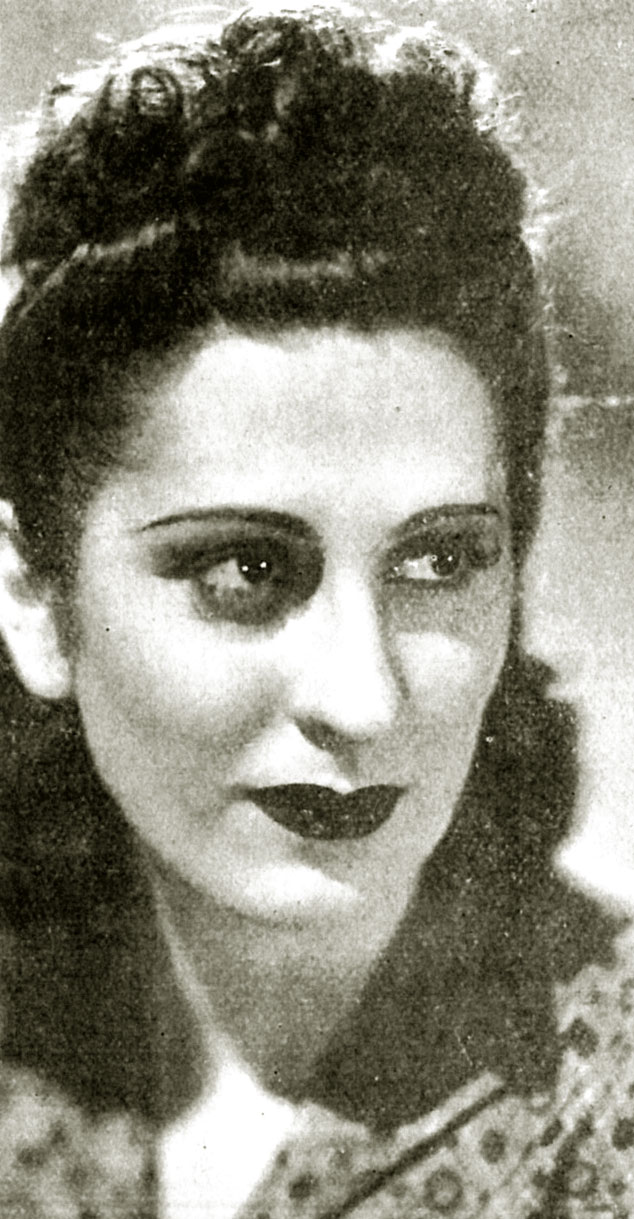
- Candiani in Trappola d'amore (1940)
- Born: 9 February 1916; Milan, Lombardy, Italy
- Died: 2 July 2005 (aged 89); Anagni, Lazio, Italy
- Occupation: Actress
- Years active: 1937–1948 (film)

Carla Candiani (1916–2005) was an Italian film actress. She was a graduate of the Centro Sperimentale di Cinematografia She played the title role in the 1942 film Captain Tempest and its sequel The Lion of Damascus.

== Selected filmography ==
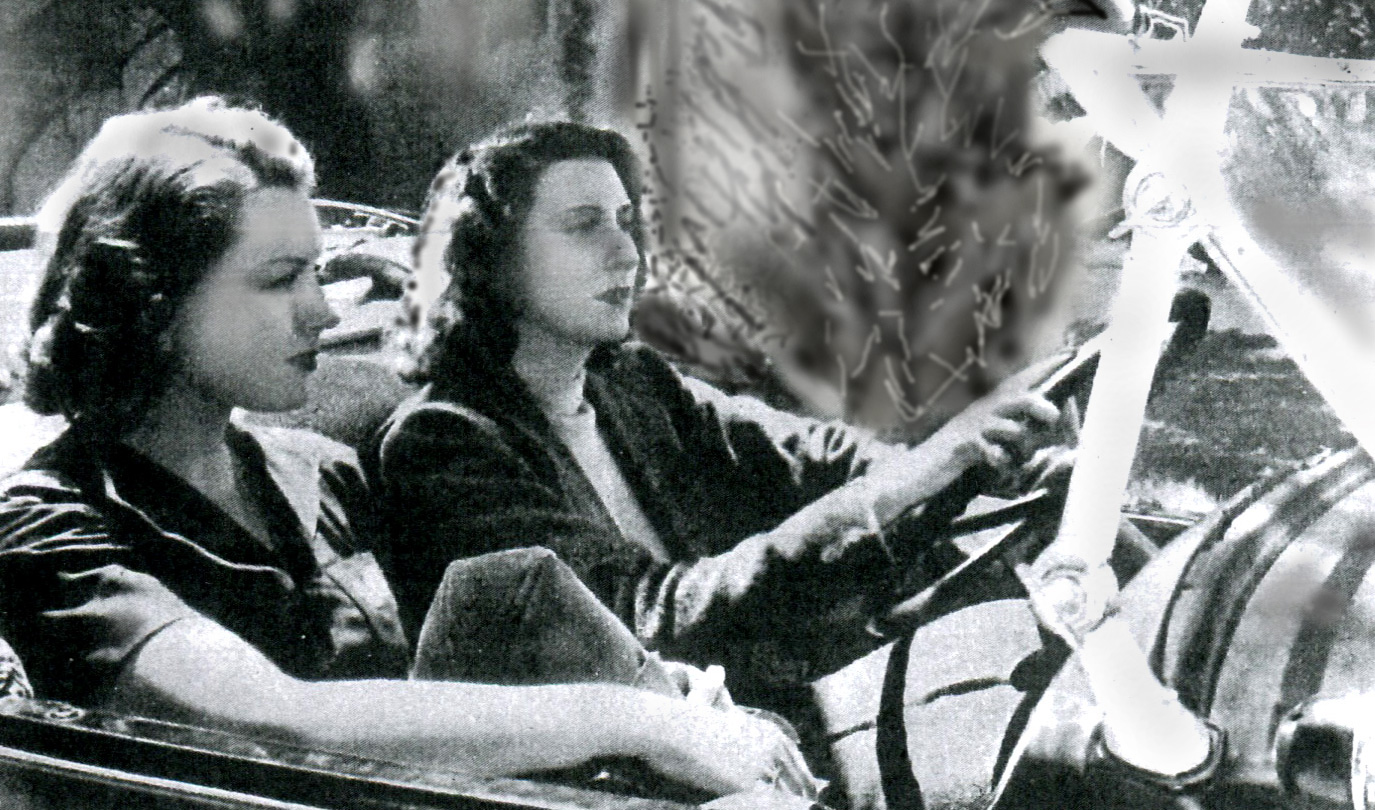
With Paola Barbara in The Property of the Absent (1940)

- The Ferocious Saladin (1937)
- The Hotel of the Absent (1939)
- Love Trap (1940)
- Tosca (1941)
- Captain Tempest (1942)
- The Lion of Damascus (1942)
- Don Juan (1942)
- Black Gold (1942)
- Sant'Elena, piccola isola 1943)
- La sua strada (1946)
- Rocambole (1948)
- The Revenge of Baccarat (1948)

== Bibliography ==
- Curti, Roberto. Italian Giallo in Film and Television: A Critical History. McFarland, 2022.
- Gundle, Stephen. Mussolini's Dream Factory: Film Stardom in Fascist Italy. Berghahn Books, 2013.
