= Doris Duranti =

Italian actress (1917–1995)

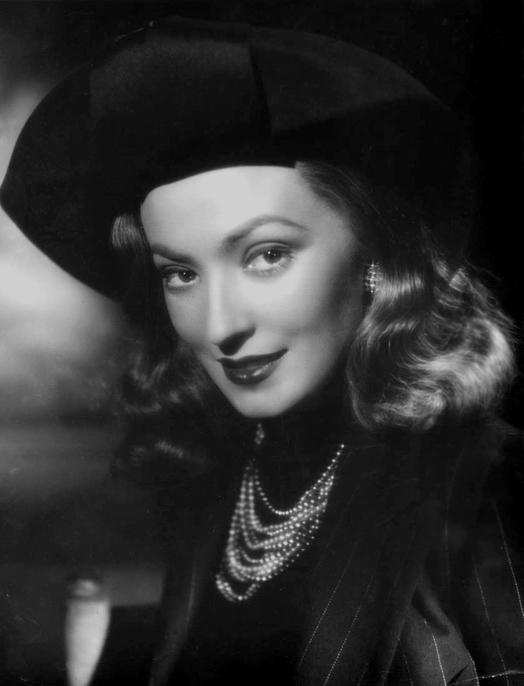
- Born: 25 April 1917; Livorno, Kingdom of Italy
- Died: 10 March 1995 (aged 77); Santo Domingo, Dominican Republic
- Occupation: Actress
- Years active: 1935–1975 (film)

Doris Duranti (25 April 1917 – 10 March 1995) was an Italian film actress. She appeared in 43 films between 1935 and 1975. She had a years-long affair with Alessandro Pavolini, a Fascist politician who in 1945 was executed in Dongo by Italian partisans; his body was then hung in Piazzale Loreto, Milan, with that of Benito Mussolini.

== Filmography ==
- Il serpente a sonagli (1935) - Collegiale
- Golden Arrow (1935) - Unknown role
- Aldebaran (1935) - Anna's friend
- The Phantom Gondola (1936) - Nelly
- Lo squadrone bianco (1936) - Una turista
- Vivere! (1936) - Unknown role
- Ginevra degli Almieri (1936) - Unknown role
- White Amazons (1936) - Unknown role
- Sentinels of Bronze (1937) - Dahabò
- Under the Southern Cross (1938) - Mailù
- Diamonds (1939) - Marta Aurasco
- Cavalleria rusticana (1939) - Lola
- Wealth Without a Future (1940) - Laura, loro nipote
- È sbarcato un marinaio (1940) - Nelly
- The Cavalier from Kruja (1940) - Eliana Haidar
- The Daughter of the Green Pirate (1940) - Manuela, la figlia del Corsaro Verde
- The King's Jester (1941) - Margot
- Captain Tempest (1942) - Haradia
- Tragic Night (1942) - Armida
- The Lion of Damascus (1942) - Haradia
- Giarabub (1942) - Dolores
- The Countess of Castiglione (1942) - Virginia Oldoini, contessa di Castiglione
- Carmela (1942) - Carmela Ferrari
- Calafuria (1943) - Marta Traversi
- Resurrection (1944) - Caterina Màslova
- Rosalba (1944) - Unknown role
- No Turning Back (1945) - Emanuela Andari
- Alguien se acerca (1948) - Unknown role
- Morning Star (1950) - Unknown role
- The Vow (1950) - Carmela
- Fugitive in Trieste (1951) - Lida
- The Counterfeiters (1951) - Teresa
- Repentance (1952) - Unknown role
- Tragic Return (1952) - Elisa
- At Sword's Edge (1952) - Columba
- The Moment of Truth (1952) - Madame Berlinga
- Papà ti ricordo (1952) - Unknown role
- La storia del fornaretto di Venezia (1952) - Bianca Sormani
- The Mute of Portici (1952) - Elvira d'Herrera
- Francis the Smuggler (1953) - Laila
- Flight 971 (1953) - Liliana Musso
- Il bacio dell'Aurora (1953)
- The Divine Nymph (1975) - Ferdinanda Fones

== Bibliography ==
- Borghini, Fabrizio, Guidi, Umberto and Sacchetti, Chiara. Livorno al cinema. Informazione, 1997.
- Gundle, Stephen. Mussolini's Dream Factory: Film Stardom in Fascist Italy. Berghahn Books, 2013.
