= 1940 in film =

The year 1940 in film involved some significant events, including the premieres of the Walt Disney films Pinocchio and Fantasia.

== Events ==
- January 26 – RKO emerges from bankruptcy with assets transferred to a new company.
- February 7 – Walt Disney's second animated feature film Pinocchio premieres at the Center Theatre in New York City. Although not a box office success upon its initial release (due to being cut off from international markets due to World War II), the film receives critical acclaim and wins two Academy Awards, including one for Best Original Song for "When You Wish Upon a Star". Through a reissue after the war, Pinocchio becomes profitable and gains a cult following; eventually, it is considered one of the greatest films of all time.
- February 10 – Tom and Jerry make their debut in the animated cartoon Puss Gets the Boot. The characters are initially known as "Jasper and Jinx" for this cartoon only.
- April 12 – Alfred Hitchcock's first American film Rebecca is released, under the production of David O. Selznick. It would go on to win the Academy Award for Best Picture.
- May – A reproduction of "America's First Movie Studio", Thomas Edison's Black Maria, is constructed.
- July 27 – Bugs Bunny makes his official debut in the animated cartoon A Wild Hare.
- October 15 – Charlie Chaplin's The Great Dictator, a satirical comedy starring him, premieres in New York City. It is a critical and commercial success and goes on to become Chaplin's most financially successful film.
- November 13 – World premiere of Walt Disney's animated film Fantasia at the Broadway Theatre in New York City, the first film to be released in a multi-channel sound format (see Fantasound). The film also marks the first use of the click track while recording the soundtrack, overdubbing of orchestral parts, simultaneous multitrack recording and is cited as a key chapter in the conception and development of the multi-channel surround system. The film is a bigger box office failure for Disney than Pinocchio was, though it recoups its cost years later and becomes one of the most highly regarded of Disney's films.
- November 20 – Consent Decree approved by Judge Henry W. Goddard to end block booking by the Big Five studios
- November 25 – Woody Woodpecker makes his debut in the Andy Panda cartoon Knock Knock.
- December 5 – Release of one of Alexander Korda's most successful films, The Thief of Bagdad, pioneering the use of chroma key effects.
- In the United Kingdom, the Crown Film Unit supersedes the GPO Film Unit in the production of documentary films.

== Academy Awards ==
- Best Picture: Rebecca – David O. Selznick, United Artists
- Best Director: John Ford – The Grapes of Wrath
- Best Actor: James Stewart – The Philadelphia Story
- Best Actress: Ginger Rogers – Kitty Foyle
- Best Supporting Actor: Walter Brennan – The Westerner
- Best Supporting Actress: Jane Darwell – The Grapes of Wrath

== Top-grossing films (U.S.) ==
The top ten 1940 released films by box office gross in North America are as follows:

Highest-grossing films of 1940
Rank	Title	Distributor	Domestic rentals
1	Boom Town	MGM	$3,664,000
2	The Great Dictator	United Artists	$3,500,000
3	Rebecca	United Artists/Selznick International	$3,000,000
4	North West Mounted Police	Paramount	$2,750,000
5	Strike Up the Band	MGM	$2,265,000
6	Northwest Passage	MGM	$2,169,000
7	Andy Hardy Meets Debutante	MGM	$1,945,000
8	The Fighting 69th	Warner Bros.	$1,822,000
9	Santa Fe Trail	Warner Bros.	$1,748,000
10	Kitty Foyle	RKO	$1,710,000

== Films by country/region ==
- Argentina
- Australia
- Austria
- Brazil
- Canada
- China
- Czechoslovakia
- Denmark
- Finland
- France
- Germany
- India
- Italy
- Japan
- Mexico
- Netherlands
- Norway
- Poland
- Portugal
- Soviet Union
- Spain
- Sweden
- United Kingdom
- United States

== Notable films ==
Films produced in the United States unless stated otherwise

=== A ===
- Abe Lincoln in Illinois, directed by John Cromwell, starring Raymond Massey
- All This and Heaven Too, directed by Anatole Litvak, starring Bette Davis and Charles Boyer
- Andy Hardy Meets Debutante, directed by George B. Seitz, starring Lewis Stone, Mickey Rooney, Cecilia Parker, Fay Holden and Judy Garland
- Angels Over Broadway, directed by Ben Hecht, starring Douglas Fairbanks Jr. and Rita Hayworth
- Anne of Windy Poplars, directed by Jack Hively, starring Anne Shirley
- The Ape, directed by William Nigh, starring Boris Karloff
- Arise, My Love, directed by Mitchell Leisen, starring Claudette Colbert and Ray Milland
- Arizona, directed by Wesley Ruggles, starring Jean Arthur, William Holden and Warren William

=== B ===
- Band Waggon, directed by Marcel Varnel, starring Arthur Askey – (GB)
- The Bank Dick, directed by Edward F. Cline, starring W. C. Fields
- Beating Heart (Battement de coeur), directed by Henri Decoin, starring Danielle Darrieux and Claude Dauphin – (France)
- Before I Hang, directed by Nick Grinde, starring Boris Karloff
- The Biscuit Eater, directed by Stuart Heisler
- Bismarck, directed by Wolfgang Liebeneiner, starring Paul Hartmann – (Germany)
- Black Friday, directed by Arthur Lubin, starring Boris Karloff and Béla Lugosi
- The Blue Bird, directed by Walter Lang, starring Shirley Temple
- Boom Town, directed by Jack Conway, starring Clark Gable, Spencer Tracy, Claudette Colbert and Hedy Lamarr
- The Boys from Syracuse, directed by A. Edward Sutherland, starring Allan Jones
- Brigham Young, directed by Henry Hathaway, starring Tyrone Power and Linda Darnell
- British Intelligence, directed by Terry O. Morse, starring Boris Karloff
- Broadway Melody of 1940, directed by Norman Taurog, starring Fred Astaire and Eleanor Powell
- Brother Orchid, directed by Lloyd Bacon, starring Edward G. Robinson, Ann Sothern and Humphrey Bogart

=== C ===
- Calling Philo Vance, directed by William Clemens, starring James Stephenson
- Castle on the Hudson, directed by Anatole Litvak, starring John Garfield, Ann Sheridan and Pat O'Brien
- Charlie Chan at the Wax Museum, directed by Lynn Shores, starring Sidney Toler
- Charlie Chan in Panama, directed by Norman Foster, starring Sidney Toler
- Christmas in July, directed by Preston Sturges, starring Dick Powell and Ellen Drew
- A Chump at Oxford, directed by Alfred J. Goulding, starring Laurel and Hardy
- City for Conquest, directed by Anatole Litvak, starring James Cagney and Ann Sheridan
- Confucius, directed by Fei Mu – (China)
- Contraband, directed by Michael Powell, starring Conrad Veidt and Valerie Hobson – (GB)
- Convoy, directed by Pen Tennyson, starring Clive Brook and John Clements – (GB)
- Crimes at the Dark House, directed by George King, starring Tod Slaughter – (GB)

=== D ===
- Dance, Girl, Dance, directed by Dorothy Arzner, starring Maureen O'Hara, Louis Hayward and Lucille Ball
- Dark Command, directed by Raoul Walsh, starring Claire Trevor, John Wayne, Walter Pidgeon and Roy Rogers
- The Devil Bat, directed by Jean Yarbrough, starring Béla Lugosi
- A Dispatch from Reuters, directed by William Dieterle, starring Edward G. Robinson
- Doomed to Die, directed by William Nigh, starring Boris Karloff
- Down Argentine Way, directed by Irving Cummings, starring Don Ameche, Betty Grable and Carmen Miranda
- Dr. Cyclops, directed by Ernest B. Schoedsack, starring Albert Dekker
- Dr. Ehrlich's Magic Bullet, directed by William Dieterle, starring Edward G. Robinson

=== E ===
- Edison, the Man, directed by Clarence Brown, starring Spencer Tracy
- Escape, directed by Mervyn LeRoy, starring Norma Shearer, Robert Taylor and Conrad Veidt

=== F ===
- Fantasia, Disney Classic directed by Samuel Armstrong, James Algar, Bill Roberts, Paul Satterfield, Ben Sharpsteen, David D. Hand, Hamilton Luske, Jim Handley, Ford Beebe, T. Hee, Norman Ferguson and Wilfred Jackson
- The Fatal Hour, directed by William Nigh, starring Boris Karloff
- The Fighting 69th, directed by William Keighley, starring James Cagney, Pat O'Brien and George Brent
- Flowing Gold, directed by Alfred E. Green, starring John Garfield, Frances Farmer and Pat O'Brien
- Foreign Correspondent, directed by Alfred Hitchcock, starring Joel McCrea, Herbert Marshall and George Sanders
- The Fox of Glenarvon (Der Fuchs von Glenarvon), propaganda film directed by Max W. Kimmich – (Germany)

=== G ===
- Gaslight, directed by Thorold Dickinson, starring Anton Walbrook and Diana Wynyard – (GB)
- The Ghost Breakers, directed by George Marshall, starring Bob Hope and Paulette Goddard
- Go West, directed by Edward Buzzell, starring the Marx Brothers
- The Grapes of Wrath, directed by John Ford, starring Henry Fonda
- The Great Dictator, directed by and starring Charlie Chaplin with Paulette Goddard and Jack Oakie
- The Great McGinty, directed by Preston Sturges, starring Brian Donlevy
- Green Hell, directed by James Whale, starring Douglas Fairbanks Jr. and Joan Bennett

=== H ===
- His Girl Friday, directed by Howard Hawks, starring Cary Grant, Rosalind Russell and Ralph Bellamy
- The House of the Seven Gables, directed by Joe May, starring George Sanders and Vincent Price
- The Howards of Virginia, directed by Frank Lloyd, starring Cary Grant and Martha Scott

=== I ===
- I Love You Again, directed by W. S. Van Dyke, starring William Powell and Myrna Loy
- I Take This Woman, directed by W. S. Van Dyke, starring Spencer Tracy and Hedy Lamarr
- The Invisible Man Returns, directed by Joe May, starring Cedric Hardwicke and Vincent Price
- The Invisible Woman, directed by A. Edward Sutherland, starring Virginia Bruce and John Barrymore
- It All Came True, directed by Lewis Seiler, starring Ann Sheridan, Jeffrey Lynn and Humphrey Bogart

=== J ===
- June Night (Juninatten), directed by Per Lindberg, starring Ingrid Bergman – (Sweden)

=== K ===
- The King of the White Elephant (Phra Chao Chang Phueak), directed by Sunh Vasudhara – (Thailand)
- Kitty Foyle, directed by Sam Wood, starring Ginger Rogers

=== L ===
- Laddie, directed by Jack Hively, starring Tim Holt
- Lady with Red Hair, directed by Curtis Bernhardt, starring Miriam Hopkins and Claude Rains
- The Letter, directed by William Wyler, starring Bette Davis and Herbert Marshall
- Lillian Russell, directed by Irving Cummings, starring Alice Faye, Don Ameche, Henry Fonda and Edward Arnold
- Little Men, directed by Norman Z. McLeod, starring Kay Francis, Jack Oakie and George Bancroft
- The Long Voyage Home, directed by John Ford, starring John Wayne and Thomas Mitchell

=== M ===
- The Mark of Zorro, directed by Rouben Mamoulian, starring Tyrone Power, Linda Darnell and Basil Rathbone
- The Mortal Storm, directed by Frank Borzage, starring Margaret Sullavan, James Stewart, Robert Young and Frank Morgan
- The Mummy's Hand, directed by Christy Cabanne, starring Dick Foran
- My Favorite Wife, directed by Garson Kanin, starring Irene Dunne, Cary Grant, Randolph Scott and Gail Patrick
- My Little Chickadee, directed by Edward F. Cline, starring Mae West and W. C. Fields

=== N ===
- New Moon, directed by Robert Z. Leonard, starring Jeanette MacDonald and Nelson Eddy
- Night Train to Munich, directed by Carol Reed, starring Margaret Lockwood and Rex Harrison – (GB)
- North West Mounted Police, directed by Cecil B. DeMille, starring Gary Cooper, Madeleine Carroll and Paulette Goddard
- Northwest Passage, directed by King Vidor, starring Spencer Tracy and Robert Young

=== O ===
- One Million B.C., directed by Hal Roach and Hal Roach Jr., starring Victor Mature, Carole Landis and Lon Chaney Jr.
- One Night in the Tropics, directed by A. Edward Sutherland, starring Abbott and Costello
- Our Town, directed by Sam Wood, starring William Holden and Martha Scott

=== P ===
- The Philadelphia Story, directed by George Cukor, starring Cary Grant, Katharine Hepburn and James Stewart
- Pinocchio, Disney Classic directed by Ben Sharpsteen and Hamilton Luske, starring Dickie Jones and Cliff Edwards
- Pride and Prejudice, directed by Robert Z. Leonard, starring Greer Garson and Laurence Olivier
- Primrose Path, directed by Gregory La Cava, starring Ginger Rogers and Joel McCrea
- The Proud Valley, directed by Pen Tennyson, starring Paul Robeson – (GB)

=== R ===
- Rebecca, directed by Alfred Hitchcock, starring Joan Fontaine and Laurence Olivier
- Remember the Night, directed by Mitchell Leisen, starring Barbara Stanwyck and Fred MacMurray
- Rhythm on the River, directed by Victor Schertzinger, starring Bing Crosby, Mary Martin and Basil Rathbone
- Road to Singapore, directed by Victor Schertzinger, starring Bing Crosby, Dorothy Lamour and Bob Hope

=== S ===
- Saps at Sea, directed by Gordon Douglas, starring Laurel and Hardy
- The Sea Hawk, directed by Michael Curtiz, starring Errol Flynn and Claude Rains
- Seven Sinners, directed by Tay Garnett, starring Marlene Dietrich and John Wayne
- The Shop Around the Corner, directed by Ernst Lubitsch, starring Margaret Sullavan and James Stewart
- The Siege of the Alcazar (L'Assedio dell'Alcazar), directed by Augusto Genina – (Italy)
- Son of Ingagi, directed by Richard Kahn
- The Son of Monte Cristo, directed by Rowland V. Lee, starring Louis Hayward, Joan Bennett and George Sanders
- The Stars Look Down, directed by Carol Reed, starring Michael Redgrave and Margaret Lockwood – (GB)
- Strange Cargo, directed by Frank Borzage, starring Clark Gable and Joan Crawford
- Stranger on the Third Floor, directed by Boris Ingster, starring Peter Lorre
- Strike Up the Band, directed by Busby Berkeley, starring Mickey Rooney and Judy Garland
- Swiss Family Robinson, directed by Edward Ludwig, starring Thomas Mitchell and Edna Best

=== T ===
- They Drive by Night, directed by Raoul Walsh, starring George Raft, Ann Sheridan, Ida Lupino and Humphrey Bogart
- They Knew What They Wanted, directed by Garson Kanin, starring Carole Lombard and Charles Laughton
- The Thief of Bagdad, directed by Michael Powell, Ludwig Berger and Tim Whelan, starring Conrad Veidt and Sabu – (GB)
- 'Til We Meet Again, directed by Edmund Goulding and Anatole Litvak, starring Merle Oberon and George Brent
- Tom Brown's School Days, directed by Robert Stevenson, starring Cedric Hardwicke and Freddie Bartholomew
- Too Many Girls, directed by George Abbott, starring Lucille Ball
- Too Many Husbands, directed by Wesley Ruggles, starring Jean Arthur, Fred MacMurray and Melvyn Douglas
- Torrid Zone, directed by William Keighley, starring James Cagney, Ann Sheridan and Pat O'Brien
- Turnabout, directed by Hal Roach, starring Adolphe Menjou, Carole Landis and John Hubbard

=== V ===
- Vasilisa the Beautiful (Vasilisa prekrasnaya), directed by Alexander Rou – (USSR)
- Vigil in the Night, directed by George Stevens, starring Carole Lombard
- Virginia City, directed by Michael Curtiz, starring Errol Flynn, Miriam Hopkins, Randolph Scott and Humphrey Bogart

=== W ===
- Waterloo Bridge, directed by Mervyn LeRoy, starring Vivien Leigh and Robert Taylor
- The Well-Digger's Daughter (La Fille du puisatier), directed by Marcel Pagnol, starring Raimu and Fernandel – (France)
- The Westerner, directed by William Wyler, starring Gary Cooper, Walter Brennan and Dana Andrews
- Where's That Fire?, directed by Marcel Varnel, starring Will Hay – (GB)

=== Y ===
- Young People, directed by Allan Dwan, starring Shirley Temple and Jack Oakie
- Young Tom Edison, directed by Norman Taurog, starring Mickey Rooney
- You're Missing the Point (Ahí está el detalle), directed by Juan Bustillo Oro, starring Cantinflas – (Mexico)

== 1940 film releases ==
United States unless stated

=== January–March ===
- January 1940
  - 26 January
    - The Fighting 69th
- February 1940
  - 23 February
    - Pinocchio

=== April–June ===
- April 1940
  - 12 April
    - Rebecca
  - 20 April
    - 'Til We Meet Again
- May 1940
  - 17 May
    - My Favorite Wife

=== July–September ===
- August 1940
  - 30 August
    - Boom Town
- September 1940
  - 20 September
    - The Mummy's Hand

=== October–December ===
- October 1940
  - 15 October
    - The Great Dictator
- November 1940
  - 6 November
    - North West Mounted Police
  - 13 November
    - Fantasia
- December 1940
  - 13 December
    - Santa Fe Trail
  - 27 December
    - Kitty Foyle

== Serials ==
- Adventures of Red Ryder, directed by William Witney and John English
- Deadwood Dick, directed by James W. Horne
- Drums of Fu Manchu, starring Henry Brandon and Robert Kellard, directed by William Witney and John English
- Flash Gordon Conquers the Universe, starring Buster Crabbe
- The Green Archer, starring Victor Jory, directed by James W. Horne
- The Green Hornet, starring Warren Hull
- Junior G-Men, starring the Dead End Kids
- King of the Royal Mounted starring Allan Lane, directed by William Witney and John English
- Mysterious Doctor Satan, starring Eduardo Ciannelli, directed by William Witney and John English
- The Shadow, starring Victor Jory, directed by James W. Horne
- Terry and the Pirates, starring William Tracy, directed by James W. Horne
- Winners of the West, starring Dick Foran and Anne Nagel

== Short film series ==
- Buster Keaton (1917–1941)
- Laurel and Hardy (1921–1943)
- Our Gang (1922–1944)
- Charley Chase (1924–1940)
- The Three Stooges (1934–1959)

== Animated short film series ==
- Krazy Kat (1925–1940)
- Mickey Mouse (1928–1953)
- Looney Tunes (1930–1969)
- Terrytoons (1930–1964)
- Merrie Melodies (1931–1969)
- Scrappy (1931–1941)
- Popeye (1933–1957)
- Color Rhapsodies (1934–1949)
- Donald Duck (1937–1956)
- Pluto (1937–1951)
- Walter Lantz Cartunes (also known as New Universal Cartoons or Cartune Comedies) (1938–1942)
- Goofy (1939–1955)
- Andy Panda (1939–1949)
  - Knock Knock! (first appearance of Woody Woodpecker)
- Tom and Jerry (1940–1958)
  - Puss Gets the Boot

== Births ==
- January 1 - Albert Nelson (actor), American actor
- January 3 – Thelma Schoonmaker, American editor
- January 19 - Mike Reid, English comedian and actor (died 2007)
- January 20 – Krishnam Raju, Indian actor (died 2022)
- January 22 – John Hurt, English actor (died 2017)
- January 25 – Paolo Graziosi, Italian actor (died 2022)
- January 27
  - James Cromwell, American actor
  - Reynaldo Rey, American actor, comedian and television personality (died 2015)
- January 29 – Katharine Ross, American actress
- January 31 – Stuart Margolin, American actor and director (died 2022)
- February 2 - David Jason, British actor
- February 4
  - George A. Romero, American director, producer and screenwriter (died 2017)
  - John Schuck, American actor
- February 5 – Dick Warlock, American actor and stuntman
- February 6 - Jim Haynie, American actor (died 2021)
- February 11 – John Fink, American actor
- February 12 – Ralph Bates, English actor (died 1991)
- February 17
  - Matija Barl, Slovenian actor, producer and translator (died 2018)
  - Jo Kendall, British actress (died 2022)
- February 19 – Carlin Glynn, American singer and actress (died 2023)
- February 23 – Peter Fonda, American actor (died 2019)
- February 27
  - Howard Hesseman, American actor (died 2022)
  - Bill Hunter, Australian actor (died 2011)
- February 29 – Harvey Jason, English actor
- March 3 – Patricia Gage, Scottish actress (died 2010)
- March 7 – Daniel J. Travanti, American actor
- March 9 – Raul Julia, Puerto Rican actor (died 1994)
- March 10 – Chuck Norris, American actor and martial artist (died 2026)
- March 11 – William Callaway, American retired voice actor
- March 22 - Haing S. Ngor, Cambodian-American actor (died 1996)
- March 26 – James Caan, American actor (died 2022)
- March 27 – Austin Pendleton, American actor, playwright, theatre director and instructor
- April 1 – Aliza Gur, Israeli actress
- April 3 – Wolf Kahler, German actor
- April 5 - Gianfranco Barra, Italian actor (died 2025)
- April 6 – Pedro Armendáriz Jr., Mexican actor (died 2011)
- April 14 – Julie Christie, British actress
- April 15 – Julie Sommars, American actress
- April 17 – Billy Fury, English singer and actor (died 1983)
- April 20 – James Gammon, American actor (died 2010)
- April 21 – George DiCenzo, American character actor (died 2010)
- April 24 – Michael Parks, American actor and singer (died 2017)
- April 25 – Al Pacino, American actor
- April 29 – Max Cullen, Australian actor
- April 30 – Burt Young, American actor (died 2023)
- May 2 – Jo Ann Pflug, American actress
- May 5 – Lance Henriksen, American actor
- May 7 – John Irvin, English director (died 2026)
- May 8 – Emilio Delgado, Mexican-American actor, voice artist and singer (died 2022)
- May 9 - James L. Brooks, American director, producer and screenwriter
- May 15 – Lainie Kazan, American actress and singer
- May 17
  - Valie Export, Austrian director
  - Peter Gerety, American actor
- May 25 - Deanna Dunagan, American actress
- May 26 - Levon Helm, American musician and actor (died 2012)
- May 28 – Josie Lloyd, American actress and director (died 2020)
- June 1 – René Auberjonois, American actor (died 2019)
- June 2 – Maree Cheatham, American actress
- June 7
  - Tom Jones, Welsh singer and actor
  - Ronald Pickup, English actor (died 2021)
- June 8 – Nancy Sinatra, American singer and actress
- June 20 – John Mahoney, English-born American actor (died 2018)
- June 21 – Mariette Hartley, American actress
- June 22 – Abbas Kiarostami, Iranian director (died 2016)
- June 23 – Adam Faith, English actor and singer (died 2003)
- June 26 – Luis Valdez, American playwright, screenwriter, director and actor
- July 4 – Karolyn Grimes, American actress
- July 7 – Ringo Starr, English drummer (The Beatles)
- July 13 – Patrick Stewart, English actor (died 2026)
- July 18 – James Brolin, American actor
- July 22 – Alex Trebek, Canadian-American game show host and television personality (died 2020)
- July 24 – Dan Hedaya, American actor
- July 28 – Phil Proctor, American actor, voice actor and member of The Firesign Theatre
- July 30 – Nicolau Breyner, Portuguese actor (died 2016)
- July 31 - Stanley R. Jaffe, American producer (died 2025)
- August 3 – Martin Sheen, American actor
- August 6 - Louise Sorel, American actress
- August 15
  - Maria Grazia Buccella, Italian actress
  - Ze'ev Revach, Israeli comedian, actor and director
- August 16 - Bruce Beresford, Australian director, screenwriter and producer
- August 19
  - Jill St. John, American actress
  - Lou Wagner, American actor
- August 23 – Tony Bill, American actor, producer and director
- August 25 – Wilhelm von Homburg, German boxer, actor and professional wrestler (died 2004)
- August 26 – Don LaFontaine, American voice actor (died 2008)
- August 27 – Sonny Sharrock, American jazz guitarist (died 1994)
- August 31
  - Larry Hankin, American character actor, performer, director, comedian and producer.
  - Jack Thompson, Australian actor
- September 2 – Harry Northup, American actor
- September 3 – Pauline Collins, British actress (died 2025)
- September 5 – Raquel Welch, American actress (died 2023)
- September 7 – Dario Argento, Italian director, producer and screenwriter
- September 11 – Brian De Palma, American director, producer and screenwriter
- September 12 – Linda Gray, American actress, director and producer
- September 18 – Frankie Avalon, American actor and singer
- September 19
  - Karin Baal, German actress (died 2024)
  - Caroline John, English actress (died 2012)
  - Paul Williams, American actor and singer
- September 20 – Jonathan Hardy, New Zealand-Australian actor, writer and director (died 2012)
- September 21
  - Rick May, Canadian-American actor and director
  - Bill Kurtis, American producer and narrator
- September 22 – Anna Karina, Danish-born French actress, director and singer (died 2019)
- September 25 – Roberto Del Giudice, Italian voice actor (died 2007)
- October 9 – John Lennon, English singer-songwriter and musician (The Beatles) (shot to death 1980)
- October 14 – Cliff Richard, English singer and actor
- October 16 – Barry Corbin, American actor
- October 19 – Michael Gambon, Irish-English actor (died 2023)
- October 25 – Jimmy Herman, Indigenous-Canadian actor (died 2013)
- October 26 – Tilo Prückner, German actor (died 2020)
- October 28 – Nic de Jager, South African actor
- October 29 – Jack Shepherd, English actor (died 2025)
- November 2 – Gigi Proietti, Italian actor (died 2020)
- November 4 – Manuel Ojeda, Mexican actor (died 2022)
- November 5 – Elke Sommer, German actress (died 2026)
- November 7 – Dakin Matthews, American actor
- November 13 – Rudolf Schwarzkogler, Austrian experimental filmmaker (died 1969)
- November 14 – Bill Bolender, American character actor
- November 15 – Sam Waterston, American actor
- November 20 – Helma Sanders-Brahms, German director (died 2014)
- November 22 – Terry Gilliam, American-born British screenwriter, director and animator (Monty Python's Flying Circus)
- November 27 – Bruce Lee, Chinese-American martial artist and actor (died 1973)
- December 1 – Richard Pryor, American comedian and actor (died 2005)
- December 11 – Donna Mills, American actress
- December 13
  - Volli Käro, Estonian actor
  - Carol Locatell, American actress (died 2023)
- December 24
  - Janet Carroll, American character actress (died 2012)
  - Sharon Farrell, American actress (died 2023)
- December 28 – Don Francisco, Chilean television host
- December 31 – Tim Considine, American actor and writer (died 2022)

== Deaths ==
- January 4 – Flora Finch, 72, American actress, A Cure for Pokeritis, The Cat and the Canary, Quality Street
- January 22 – E. Alyn Warren, 65, American actor, The Mysterious Mr. Wong, Get That Man, Revolt of the Zombies, Port of Seven Seas
- February 20 – George Periolat, 66, American actor, The Mark of Zorro, One Rainy Afternoon, Morning Glory, What Price Hollywood?
- March 5 – Maxine Elliott, 66, American actress, Fighting Odds
- April 9 – Mrs. Patrick Campbell, 75, English actress, Riptide, One More River
- April 11 – Hemmo Kallio, 77, Finnish actor, Anna Liisa
- May 25 – Joe De Grasse, 67, Canadian-born American film director, Heart o' the Hills, The Scarlet Car, The Girl of the Night
- May 28 - Walter Connolly, 53, American actor, It Happened One Night
- July 1 – Ben Turpin, 70, American actor, Saps at Sea, Mr. Flip, A Clever Dummy
- July 15 – Donald Calthrop, 52, English actor, Scrooge, Blackmail, Murder!, Major Barbara
- September 25 – Marguerite Clark, 57, American actress, Scrambled Wives, Easy to Get, All of a Sudden Peggy, A Girl Named Mary
- October 10 – Berton Churchill, 63, Canadian actor, Stagecoach, I Am a Fugitive from a Chain Gang, In Old Chicago, Heroes for Sale
- October 12 – Tom Mix, 60, American actor, The Miracle Rider, Riders of the Purple Sage, Sky High
- December 13 – Wilfred Lucas, 69, Canadian-born American actor, screenwriter, director, Modern Times, A Chump at Oxford, The Girl and Her Trust

== Debuts ==
- Vera Altayskaya – Tanya
- Herbert Anderson – The Fighting 69th
- Dana Andrews – Lucky Cisco Kid
- John Banner – Spring Parade
- Anne Baxter – 20 Mule Team
- William Bendix – They Drive by Night
- Joe Besser – Hot Steel
- Whit Bissell – The Sea Hawk
- David Bruce – The Sea Hawk
- Vera Carmi – Goodbye Youth
- Anthony Caruso – Johnny Apollo
- Ken Christy – Foreign Correspondent
- Abbott and Costello – One Night in the Tropics
- Peggy Cummins – Dr. O'Dowd
- Donald Curtis – Emergency Squad
- Helmut Dantine – Escape
- Carla Del Poggio – Maddalena, Zero for Conduct
- Brad Dexter – The Mortal Storm
- Irasema Dilián – La Comédie du bonheur
- Tom Drake – The Mortal Storm
- Vlasta Fabianová – May Fairy Tale
- Connie Gilchrist – Hullabaloo
- Hugh Griffith – Night Train to Munich
- Margaret Hayes – The Man Who Talked Too Much
- Eva Henning – Gentleman att hyra
- Van Johnson – Too Many Girls
- John Justin – The Thief of Bagdad
- Arthur Kennedy – City for Conquest
- Deborah Kerr – Contraband
- Andrea King – The Ramparts We Watch
- Karl Malden – They Knew What They Wanted
- Lynn Merrick – 'Til We Meet Again
- Terry Moore – Maryland
- Milo O'Shea – Contraband
- Rebel Randall – Turnabout
- Donna Reed – Convicted Woman
- Herbert Rudley – Abe Lincoln in Illinois
- Robert Ryan – The Ghost Breakers
- Phil Silvers – Hit Parade of 1941
- Gale Storm – Tom Brown's School Days
- Gene Tierney – The Return of Frank James
- David Tomlinson – Garrison Follies
- Forrest Tucker – The Westerner
- James Westerfield – The Howards of Virginia
- Gig Young – Misbehaving Husbands
