= Wildcat (1942 film) =

1942 film by Frank McDonald

- Theatrical release poster
- Directed by: Frank McDonald
- Screenplay by: Richard Murphy; Maxwell Shane
- Based on: story "Roaring Gold" by North Bigbee
- Produced by: William H. Pine; William C. Thomas
- Starring: Richard Arlen; Arline Judge; William Frawley; Buster Crabbe; Arthur Hunnicutt; Elisha Cook, Jr. Ralph Sanford
- Cinematography: Fred Jackman Jr.
- Edited by: William H. Ziegler
- Music by: Freddie Rich
- Production company: Pine-Thomas Productions
- Distributed by: Paramount Pictures
- Release date: September 3, 1942
- Running time: 70 minutes
- Country: United States
- Language: English

Wildcat is a 1942 American drama film directed by Frank McDonald and written by Richard Murphy and Maxwell Shane. The film stars Richard Arlen, Arline Judge, William Frawley, Buster Crabbe, Arthur Hunnicutt, Elisha Cook, Jr. and Ralph Sanford. The film was released on September 3, 1942, by Paramount Pictures.

== Plot ==
Oil man Johnny Maverick dubs a young hitchhiker "Chicopee" after the name of his hometown, then makes him a full partner, digging for oil. Chicopee is killed in a rig accident, however, and rival Mike Rawlins then sabotages the rig.

Things get worse for Johnny when con artists Nan and Oliver turn up. She pretends to be Chicopee's sister, so Johnny gullibly gives her the half-interest in his oil rig.

Rawlins buys up Johnny's outstanding debts and intends to take over. In an act of desperation, Johnny uses nitroglycerine to blast open an oil well, resulting in a gusher. An explosion ends up knocking Rawlins unconscious and pinning Johnny beneath the wreckage, but Nan, having fallen in love with Johnny, comes to his rescue.

== Cast ==
- Richard Arlen as Johnny Maverick
- Arline Judge as Nan Deering
- William Frawley as Oliver Westbrook
- Buster Crabbe as Mike Rawlins
- Arthur Hunnicutt as 'Watchfob' Jones
- Elisha Cook, Jr. as Harold 'Chicopee' Nevins
- Ralph Sanford as 'Grits' O'Malley
- Alec Craig as Joseph D. Campbell
- John Dilson as Gus Sloane
- Will Wright as John 'Paw' Smithers
- Jessica Newcombe as Martha 'Maw' Smithers
- William Benedict as Bud Smithers

== Production ==
The film was based on a story by North Bigbee, a journalist who had worked in the oil industry, which was purchased by Pine-Thomas Productions. They assigned it to star Richard Arlen, after he did Torpedo Boat for the studio.

Pine-Thomas wanted a "Jean Harlow type" for the female lead and even tested Harlow's stand in. Jean Wallace was originally announced for the role but did not appear in the final movie. She was replaced by Arline Judge who signed a three-picture deal with Pine-Thomas.

The film reportedly had Pine-Thomas' biggest budget yet to date.
