= Timber Queen (1944 film) =

1944 film by Frank McDonald

- Directed by: Frank McDonald
- Written by: Edward T. Lowe Jr. Maxwell Shane
- Produced by: William H. Pine; William C. Thomas
- Cinematography: Fred Jackman Jr.
- Edited by: Victor Lewis
- Music by: Willy Stahl
- Distributed by: Paramount Pictures
- Release date: January 13, 1944
- Running time: 66 minutes
- Country: United States
- Language: English

Timber Queen is a 1944 American lumberjack drama film directed by Frank McDonald.

It was Arlen's last film for Pine-Thomas for a number of years until Speed to Spare (1948).

== Plot ==
Russ Evans gets out of the service and meets Elaine, the widow of Ken, a man he served with. He helps her protect the rights to some timber land that she has inherited.

== Cast ==
- Richard Arlen as Russell (Russ) Evans
- Mary Beth Hughes as Elaine Graham
- June Havoc as Lil Boggs
- Sheldon Leonard as Smacksie Golden
- George E. Stone as Squirrel
- Dick Purcell as Milt Holmes
- Charles Anthony Hughes as Harold Talbot
- Edmund MacDonald as Joe Birsdell
- William Haade as Rawson
- Clancy Cooper as Barney
- Dewey Robinson as Wenzel
- Horace McMahon as Rodney
- Jimmy Ames as Strudel

== Production ==
The film was originally called Timberman. Pine-Thomas signed Mary Beth Hughes to make this film and a musical The Duchess Rides High.

Filming took place in July 1943.

The film was slanted more towards comedy than many earlier Pine-Thomas films.
