= One Body Too Many =

1944 film by Frank McDonald

- Promotional release poster
- Directed by: Frank McDonald
- Written by: Winston Miller; Maxwell Shane
- Produced by: William H. Pine; William C. Thomas
- Starring: Jack Haley; Jean Parker; Maxine Fife; Bela Lugosi; Lyle Talbot
- Cinematography: Fred Jackman Jr.
- Edited by: Henry Adams
- Music by: Alexander Laszlo
- Production company: Pine-Thomas Productions
- Distributed by: Paramount Pictures
- Release date: 1944
- Running time: 75 minutes
- Country: United States
- Language: English

One Body Too Many is a 1944 American comedy horror mystery film directed by Frank McDonald, starring Bela Lugosi, Jack Haley and Lyle Talbot. The film was the second comedy featuring Haley to be produced by Pine-Thomas Productions, part of the studio's new direction towards comedy films. The original intention was to hire Boris Karloff for the film's key horror role, but Lugosi was hired instead.

The film is set in the mansion of a recently deceased millionaire. An insurance salesman arrives by coincidence, and he is mistaken for the private detective who is supposed to guard the corpse. The terms of the millionaire's will depend on whether he is buried according to his wishes or not. One of the potential heirs has decided to steal the corpse, and they are willing to kill the new guard.

== Plot ==
Mild-mannered insurance salesman Albert L. Tuttle (Jack Haley) visits eccentric millionaire Cyrus J. Rutherford, intent on selling him a $200,000 insurance deal. Instead he finds that Rutherford has recently died and his mansion is now full of relatives who are, according to the will, all bound to remain in the mansion until a glass-domed vault is constructed on the roof to house the deceased millionaire, who was an ardent follower of the stars.

Tuttle is mistaken for a private detective sent to guard the body, and once the confusion is cleared up and the real detective fails to show, he is persuaded by Rutherford's niece Carol Dunlap to remain and ensure that the body is not stolen. If the body should be buried any place other than the vault, the will states that the beneficiaries who should receive the largest bequests would receive the smallest, and vice versa.

One of the recipients plans to reverse the will in their favor, hide the body and kill anyone who gets in their way. Unfortunately for Tuttle, he is directly in the way of the killer, and the rest of the conniving family.

== Cast ==
- Jack Haley as Albert L. Tuttle
- Jean Parker as Carol Dunlap
- Bela Lugosi as Merkil, the butler
- Blanche Yurka as Matthews
- Lyle Talbot as Jim Davis
- Douglas Fowley as Henry Rutherford
- Fay Helm as Estelle Hopkins
- Bernard Nedell as Attorney Morton Gellman
- Lucien Littlefield as Kenneth Hopkins
- Dorothy Granger as Mona Rutherford
- William Edmunds as Prof. Hilton
- Maxine Fife as Margaret Hopkins

== Production ==
Pine-Thomas Productions originally specialized in action films but decided to move into comedy and signed Jack Haley to star in movies for the company. This was his second comedy for Pine-Thomas.

Pine and Thomas originally wanted Boris Karloff for the key horror role. Frank McDonald signed to direct in December 1943, when it was known as Too Many Bodies. Eventually Bela Lugosi was signed.
