= The Navy Way =

1944 film by William A. Berke

- Directed by: William Berke
- Written by: Maxwell Shane (original screenplay)
- Produced by: L.B. Merman (associate producer); William H. Pine (producer); William C. Thomas (producer)
- Starring: Robert Lowery
- Cinematography: Fred Jackman Jr.
- Edited by: Howard A. Smith
- Music by: Willy Stahl
- Color process: Black and white
- Production company: Pine-Thomas Productions
- Distributed by: Paramount Pictures
- Release date: February 26, 1944
- Running time: 74 minutes
- Country: United States
- Language: English

The Navy Way is a 1944 American war film directed by William Berke concentrating on US Navy recruit training with many sequences filmed at the Great Lakes Naval Training Center. The film had its premiere at the Genesee Theatre in nearby Waukegan, Illinois.

== Plot ==
Five men enlist in the navy: Frankie, who did it after finding his fiancée Agnes in the arms of another man; Malcolm, a millionaire; Billy, who has never left home and whose father died in World War One; rancher Steve, whose son died in battle; and boxer Johnny, who was drafted.

The five men are in the same company. Steve becomes a father figure to Billy but Johnny is resentful about his boxing career being interrupted. Johnny falls for Ellen, a WAVE.

Johnny wins a fight for his company with a broken hand, impressing the others, although he has constant discipline problems.

During a training exercise Johnny saves Steve from drowning. Frankie and Agnes get married and Ellen and Malcolm fall in love. Johnny finds out and goes on a drunken binge with Malcolm's ex, Trudy. Malcolm tries to get Johnny to come back to base before he gets in trouble but Johnny beats him up.

Johnny takes full responsibility and faces a court martial. Johnny's parents plead his case as does Chaplain Benson. Johnny is given a second chance and the friends go off to fight together.

== Cast ==
- Robert Lowery as Johnny Zumano aka Johnny Jersey
- Jean Parker as Ellen Sayre
- William Henry as Malcolm Randall
- Roscoe Karns as Frankie Gimble
- Sharon Douglas as Trudy
- Robert Armstrong as CPO Harper
- Tom Keene as Steve Appleby
- Larry Nunn as Billy Jamison
- Mary Treen as Agnes
- Wallace Pindell as Sailor Joslin
- John 'Skins' Miller as Recruit Pop Lacy
- Joseph Crehan as Chaplain Benson
- Commander Hjalmar F. Hanson as Great Lakes Naval Station Choir Director
- Art Lasky as Fighter
- John J. 'Red' Madigan as Sailor

== Production ==
In July 1943, Pine Thomas announced that Jean Parker and Russell Hayden would star and that the film would be shot at the Great Lakes Naval Training School. In September William Henry had replaced Hayden as the lead. Tom Keene signed to play a role under the name "Richard Powers". Jean Parker made the film as the first of a new three-picture contract with Pine-Thomas. The other male lead was given to Robert Lowery, who was signed by Pine Thomas to a long-term contract.

== Reception ==
The film had its world premiere in late March 1944 at the Great Lakes Naval Training Station.
