= Flying Blind (film) =

1941 film by Frank McDonald

- Theatrical poster
- Directed by: Frank McDonald
- Written by: Maxwell Shane; Richard Murphy
- Produced by: William H. Pine; William C. Thomas associate John W. Rogers
- Starring: Richard Arlen; Jean Parker; Nils Asther; Marie Wilson; Roger Pryor; Eddie Quillan; Dick Purcell
- Cinematography: Fred Jackman Jr.
- Edited by: Robert O. Crandall
- Music by: Dimitri Tiomkin
- Production company: Picture Corporation of America
- Distributed by: Paramount Pictures
- Release date: August 29, 1941
- Running time: 69 minutes
- Country: United States
- Language: English
- Budget: less than $90,000
- Box office: more than $500,000

Flying Blind is a 1941 American action comedy film directed by Frank McDonald and distributed by Paramount Pictures. The film was the second movie from Pine-Thomas Productions. That company's first three films formed an unofficial "aviation trilogy"; all starred Richard Arlen.

== Plot ==
After being fired for taking the blame for his co-pilot's incompetence, airline pilot Jim Clark starts his own airline, Honeymoon Air, flying for weddings and divorces between Los Angeles and Las Vegas/Reno. He brings stewardess Shirley Brooks with him as a partner. (Note: The plot of Flying Blind was influenced by the real-life Paul Mantz Air Services (jokingly christened the "Hollywood Express"'), an air charter company owned and operated by Hollywood pilot Paul Mantz.) Jim is in love with Shirley, but has not asked her yet because of all the work in starting the new business. Shirley mistakes this for a lack of interest. Tired of waiting, she becomes engaged to another pilot, Bob Fuller. Jim is upset and arranges for Bob to go to Hackensack, New Jersey, for a phoney job just to get him out of the way and prevent Shirley from marrying him.

Next, Jim and Shirley fly to Las Vegas with two newlywed couples: Veronica and Chester Gimble, and Danila and Eric Karolek (in reality, a spy named Colonel Boro). Joining them is their mechanic, Riley, who is expecting to become a father any day. Jim is unaware that the Karolek couple are spies who work for Rocky Drake, attempting to steal a transformer used for a top-secret XB-62 bomber prototype. While the others are off celebrating, Drake meets his contact, gets the transformer and kills the man delivering it.

Drake talks his way onto Jim's aircraft, flying back to Los Angeles. When Jim learns from the tower that Drake is wanted, he tries to turn the aircraft back to turn him in to the police, but Drake forces him to continue. They fight over control of the aircraft. Shirley, not realizing it is for real, gives Drake's gun to Eric Karolek, who forces Jim to fly towards Mexico. On the way, the aircraft passes through a storm and starts shaking violently, causing an Allison V-12 engine block Drake brought aboard, to break loose, smashing instruments and engine controls inside the cockpit. Even with his engines shut down, Jim manages to land in the mountains.

While Jim and Drake try to repair the aircraft, Chester Gimble starts a signal fire, but in the dry brush it leads to a larger, uncontrolled fire. The fire comes closer and threatens them all, but soon the aircraft is ready to fly. Drake and the Karoleks try to commandeer the flight and a struggle ensues. In the end, Riley shoots and kills Drake. They all board the aircraft and Jim is able to take off.

Jim flies back to Las Vegas just in time to get the transformer back in place in the bomber before its test flight. Jim is the hero of the day, and he and Shirley go back to Los Angeles. When Bob comes back from New Jersey, upset because of the stunt Jim pulled on him, Shirley informs him that their engagement is off and that she instead plans to marry Jim.

== Cast ==
- Richard Arlen as Jim Clark
- Jean Parker as Shirley Brooks
- Nils Asther as Eric Karolek/Colonel Boro
- Marie Wilson as Veronica Gimble
- Roger Pryor as Rocky Drake
- Eddie Quillan as Riley
- Dick Purcell as Bob Fuller
- Grady Sutton as Chester Gimble
- Kay Sutton as Miss Danila
- Charlotte Henry as Corenson's Secretary
- William Hall as Lew West
- Dwight Frye as Leo Qualen
- James Seay as Dispatcher

== Production ==
Flying Blind was the third film from William Pine and William C. Thomas, former press agents turned movie producers. They wanted to make lower-budgeted action films and teamed with Richard Arlen, who was known for aviation movies and who ran an aviation school. Pine and Thomas selected three titles, Power Dive, Forced Landing and Flying Blind, and wrote scripts around them. They went to Paramount and said they had a star and three scripts and asked for a distribution deal. Paramount agreed, enabling Pine and Thomas to get loans from the bank to finance the films, all of which starred Arlen and were written by Maxwell Shane.

The female lead, Jean Parker, was in Power Dive and would be in many Pine-Thomas Films. Casting was set in May 1941.

Principal photography for Flying Blind took place from mid-June to early July 1941 at the Fine Arts Studios, Hollywood, California, and the Alhambra and Rosemead, California airports.

Stock footage was used of a Boeing 247 and a Douglas DC-3 airliner with other flying scenes using a Lockheed 12A Junior Electra. Various light aircraft, including Arlen's Luscombe, were visible in the airport scenes, while Northrop A-17 bombers are at the military airport. (Note: Arlen, a former World War I pilot, was able to fly his own aircraft in several scenes.)

== Reception ==
All three films including Flying Blind cost under $90,000 and returned six times its negative cost. Paramount was so pleased with these results that it offered to finance the duo's films from then on.

Flying Blind was another in the series of B films churned out by the Pine-Thomas team. Along with flying scenes, the use of zany characters and slapstick efforts were juxtaposed with a spy story, as evidenced by the original tagline: "A plane-load of thrills ... as two lovers battle spies in the skies!" The film's villain was Swedish-born Nils Asther, who was featured in three war adventures put out by William H. Pine and William C. Thomas.

The review in Los Angeles Times of Flying Blind said, "it trips over its own frenzy."
