= Gambler's Choice =

1944 film by Frank McDonald

- Directed by: Frank McDonald
- Written by: Irving Reis; Maxwell Shane
- Based on: story by James Edward Grant; Howard Emmett Rogers
- Produced by: William H. Pine; William C. Thomas
- Starring: Chester Morris; Nancy Kelly
- Cinematography: Fred Jackman Jr.
- Edited by: Howard A. Smith
- Music by: Mort Glickman
- Production company: Pine-Thomas Productions
- Distributed by: Paramount Pictures
- Release date: April 27, 1944
- Running time: 66 minutes
- Country: United States
- Language: English

Gambler's Choice is a 1944 film directed by Frank McDonald and starring Chester Morris and Nancy Kelly.

== Plot ==
In 1897, three children, Ross Hadley, Mike McGlennon and Mary Rogers, are brought before a judge for stealing a man's wallet. McGlennon and Rogers have no prior record, so they are released to their parents. Hadley, however, is sent to a reform school.

In 1911, Hadley quits working for casino owner Chappie Wilson to start his own business, financed by Fay Lawrence, the rich widow of a bookie. To compete, Wilson hires a beautiful singer, Vi Parker, "the Garter Girl". When Hadley sees her perform, he recognizes her as Mary Rogers. He takes her to a police station, much to her confusion. There she is reunited with Lieutenant Mike McGlennon. Then Hadley takes them both to see his grand, brand-new gambling establishment. Hadley offers McGlennon a small share, but McGlennon is an honest cop. Hadley also offers "Vi" a job. She turns him down, but when Wilson and a henchman come to retrieve her, Hadley punches Wilson, and McGlennon takes care of the henchman, so she has to work for him. Lawrence is not happy about this arrangement and tries to fire her, but Hadley pays off her loan to him and kicks her out.

== Cast ==
- Chester Morris as Ross Hadley
- Nancy Kelly as Mary Rogers, aka Vi Parker
- Russell Hayden as Mike McGlennon
- Lee Patrick as Fay Lawrence
- Lloyd Corrigan as Ulysses S. Rogers
- Sheldon Leonard as Chappie Wilson
- Lyle Talbot as Yellow Gloves Weldon
- Maxine Lewis as Bonnie D'Arcy
- Tom Dugan as Benny
- Charles Arnt as John McGrady
- Billy Nelson as Danny May

== Production ==
In 1942, MGM remade Manhattan Melodrama, a film about two boyhood friends who grow up on opposite sides of the law. It was titled Gambler's Choice, then Northwest Rangers. This movie has a similar storyline, with two boyhood friends growing up on opposite sites of the law.

In June 1943 Pine-Thomas signed a new contract with Paramount which included three musicals, and two bigger-budgeted pictures, plus three wartime movies which would co-star Chester Morris and Russell Hayden as a team (replacing Morris and Richard Arlen). Hayden had just left Columbia Pictures.

In September 1943 Pine Thomas bought a story by James Edward Grant and Howard called "Tenderloin" as a vehicle for Chester Morris. (They also bought Hell's Afloat for Morris which was never made.) Russell Hayden and Nancy Kelly were cast in November 1943 when the film's title was changed to Gambler's Choice.

Filming took place in December 1943.

== Soundtrack ==
- Nancy Kelly - "The Sidewalks of New York" (music by Charles Lawlor, lyrics by James W. Blake)
- Nancy Kelly - "Hold Me Just a Little Closer" (music by Albert von Tilzer, lyrics by Benjamin Barnett)
