= I Live on Danger =

1942 film by Sam White

- Directed by: Sam White
- Screenplay by: Lewis R. Foster; Richard Murphy; Maxwell Shane
- Story by: Lewis R. Foster; Alex Gottlieb
- Produced by: William H. Pine; William C. Thomas
- Starring: Chester Morris; Jean Parker
- Cinematography: Fred Jackman
- Edited by: William H. Ziegler
- Music by: Freddie Rich
- Production company: Pine-Thomas Productions
- Distributed by: Paramount Pictures
- Release date: June 16, 1942
- Running time: 73 minutes
- Country: United States
- Language: English

I Live on Danger is a 1942 American film noir thriller film directed by Sam White and starring Chester Morris and Jean Parker.

== Plot ==
Jeff Morrell is an ambitious radio reporter. The news of the day is the prison release of gambler Eddie Nelson, who was the fallguy for a criminal named Joey Farr.

While exclusively covering a ship's fire, Jeff falls for Susan Richards, and knows her to be Eddie's companion. It turns out she's Eddie's sister, not his girl, and Susan resents it when Jeff's reporting gets Eddie arrested and convicted on a new charge.

District Attorney Lamber is in cahoots with the crooks. Farr tries to flee, and is tracked to a Pennsylvania coal mine. Jeff gets there first and manages to broadcast Farr's confession, then barely gets away when Farr sets off a blast of TNT. Susan loves Jeff for heroically rescuing her brother.

== Cast ==
- Chester Morris as Jeff Morrell
- Jean Parker as Susan Richards
- Elisabeth Risdon as Mrs. Morrell
- Edward Norris as Eddie Nelson
- Dick Purcell as Norm Thompson
- Roger Pryor as Bert Jannings
- Douglas Fowley as Joey Farr
- Ralph Sanford as Angie Moss
- Edwin Maxwell as Wingy Keefe
- Patsy Nash as Dilly
- Joe Cunningham as Inspector Conlon
- Bernadene Hayes as Jonesy
- Billy Nelson as George "Longshot" Harrison
- Vickie Lester as Keefe's secretary
- William Bakewell as Mac
- Charlotte Henry as Nurse
- Anna Q. Nilsson as Mrs. Sherman

== Production ==
The film was based on a story called I'll Be Back in a Flash by Alex Gottlieb. He sold it to Pine Thomas Productions in August 1941. They bought it as the second in a three-picture deal Chester Morris had with Pine-Thomas Productions. Lewis Foster was assigned to write the script.

Morris' 38-year-old brother Arthur was meant to play a role in the film but died shortly before filming of a brain haemorrhage.

Jean Parker signed to make the film as the first in a three-picture deal she had with Pine Thomas.

Filming took place in December 1941. Though reported as being Anna Q. Nilsson's first role in 13 years, this isn't even remotely true, as she had numerous appearances, both credited and uncredited, in films throughout the 1930s and early 1940s. Charlotte Henry, who had headlined the 1933 film Alice In Wonderland, appears in a small role as a nurse; this was her final film before retiring from on-screen acting (though she moved to San Diego and remained active in local theatre).

== Reception ==
The Los Angeles Times called it "a pretty good B".

The New York Times said the film showed "very little than what we have already seen."
