= High Explosive (film) =

1943 film by Frank McDonald

- Theatrical release poster
- Directed by: Frank McDonald
- Screenplay by: Maxwell Shane; Howard J. Green
- Story by: "You Can't Life Forever" by Joseph Hoffman
- Produced by: William H. Pine; William C. Thomas
- Starring: Chester Morris; Jean Parker; Barry Sullivan; Ralph Sanford; Barbara Lynn
- Cinematography: Fred Jackman Jr.
- Edited by: William H. Ziegler
- Music by: Daniele Amfitheatrof
- Production company: Pine-Thomas Productions
- Distributed by: Paramount Pictures
- Release date: March 27, 1943
- Running time: 60 minutes
- Country: United States
- Language: English

High Explosive is a 1943 American drama film directed by Frank McDonald and written by Maxwell Shane and Howard J. Green for Pine-Thomas Productions. The film stars Chester Morris, Jean Parker, Barry Sullivan, Ralph Sanford, Rand Brooks and Dick Purcell. The film was released on March 27, 1943, by Paramount Pictures.

== Plot ==
Midget car racer Buzz Mitchell meets his old friend Mike Douglas in Washington, D.C. With war on the horizon, Mike has landed an exclusive contract to supply nitroglycerin to the largest munitions works in the world, which will require running delivery trucks night and day. Mike wants Buzz, an experienced nitro driver and Mike's former partner, to work for him. Buzz turns him down.

A 21-year-old named Jimmy Baker asks Mike for a job as a driver, but then Mike learns that he is the brother of his secretary, Connie. She tries to dissuade Jimmy, but he wants to marry Doris and needs the money. He says he only needs to work for three months, so she reluctantly agrees.

Buzz shows up while Mike is out. When he overhears Connie saying that no driver is available to take the tow truck for a truck with a busted axle, he drives it himself, without her permission, and delivers the load to the plant. Mike is delighted to have Buzz working for him. He assigns Jimmy to Buzz for a couple of days for on-the-job training. Later, Connie reads in a magazine that Buzz was forced to retire from racing.

Buzz tries to romance Connie, but she is not interested. Buzz is certain that she is sweet on Mike. However, his persistence pays off, and she warms to him.

Mike sends Buzz and Jimmy to put out an oil well fire (an explosion will deprive the fire of oxygen). Buzz saves Jimmy's life when Jimmy does not notice that the can of nitro he is carrying is leaking. Buzz grabs the can and throws it away before the fire can set it off prematurely; it explodes on impact. When they get back, Buzz is reamed out by Mike for letting Jimmy handle the nitro despite his explicit order to do all the work himself. Connie overhears and asks Mike to drive her home, breaking her date with Buzz.

The next day, Connie breaks up with Buzz over the incident. Buzz has Jimmy assigned his delivery and takes Doris for a bit of flying, just to get a reaction from Connie. When Jimmy stops for some food, a woman drives up and nudges his parked truck, sending it rolling downhill on a highway. Jimmy takes her car and drives in front of the runaway, warning other drivers. However, when they reach a curve, the truck goes off the road and explodes, killing Jimmy. Connie blames Buzz.

Buzz quits, but Mike learns that a big oil tank fire is threatening the munitions plant. This is just after the attack on Pearl Harbor. He has no nitro left, so he has to have it flown in. Buzz has piloted an airplane transporting nitro before, so he reluctantly agrees to do it. Mike goes with him. When they return, the airfield is covered in fog with zero visibility. They circle the field until almost all their fuel is gone. The only thing they can see is the oil fire. Buzz tells Mike to drop a flare on the runway. When he opens the door, Buzz pushes him out to parachute to the ground. With no safe place to dump the nitro and the munitions plant needed more than ever, Buzz crashes into the fire, and the explosion extinguishes it.

== Cast ==
- Chester Morris as Buzz Mitchell
- Jean Parker as Connie Baker
- Barry Sullivan as Mike Douglas
- Ralph Sanford as Squinchy Andrews
- Rand Brooks as Jimmy Baker
- Dick Purcell as Dave
- Barbara Lynn as Doris Lynch
- Allan Bryon as Joe

== Production ==
The film was based on a story by Joseph Hoffman, "You Can't Live Forever". Pine-Thomas Productions purchased it in April 1942 as a vehicle for Chester Morris.

The film was also known as Nitro Trucks. Howard Green wrote the script and Jean Parker was signed to costar.

Filming started in August 1942. The film gave an early role to Barry Sullivan. It was retitled High Explosive by December 1942.

== Reception ==
The Variety review stated, "This is a good action melodrama of regular program calibre".
