= The Last Outpost (1951 film) =

1951 film by Lewis R. Foster

- Theatrical release poster
- Directed by: Lewis R. Foster
- Written by: Winston Miller; Daniel Mainwaring (as Geoffrey Homes); George Worthing Yates; David Lang (story)
- Produced by: William H. Pine; William C. Thomas
- Starring: Ronald Reagan; Rhonda Fleming; Bruce Bennett; Bill Williams; Noah Beery Jr. John Ridgely
- Cinematography: Loyal Griggs
- Music by: Lucien Cailliet
- Production company: Pine-Thomas Productions
- Distributed by: Paramount Pictures
- Release dates: April 4, 1951; June 21, 1951 (New York)
- Running time: 89 minutes
- Country: United States
- Language: English

The Last Outpost is a 1951 American Technicolor Western film directed by Lewis R. Foster and starring Ronald Reagan and Rhonda Fleming. The film is set during the American Civil War, with brothers on opposite sides.

The film earned an estimated $1,225,000 at the American box office in 1951 and became the most successful film for the prolific B movie company Pine-Thomas Productions. The film was rereleased in 1962 by Citation Films under the title of Cavalry Charge.

== Plot ==
In 1862, Confederate Army captain Vance Britton and his cavalry force are capturing most of the supplies sent east along the Santa Fe Trail before they reach the Union Army outpost at San Gil, Arizona, where trading post owner Sam McQuade deals with the Apache Indians. Union colonel Jeb Britton, Vance's brother, is sent west to stop the Confederate raids, unaware that his brother is his adversary. When he arrives with only a small detachment of troops, McQuade tries to persuade Jeb to use the Apaches to subdue the rebels, but Jeb rejects the idea, certain that the Indians would kill settlers as well as Confederate soldiers.

That evening, McQuade, believing that Jeb, rather than Vance, is the Britton who was once the fiancé of McQuade's lonely and unhappy wife Julie, tries to embarrass them both socially. McQuade angrily tells Julie that she is still pining for Vance and she leaves him. Vance turns the tables on Jeb’s attempt to trap the rebels and humiliates him. Returning to the fort on foot and bootless, Jeb is informed by McQuade that he has persuaded the government to negotiate with the Apaches. Soon afterward, McQuade is attacked and killed by Apaches. Vance finds a letter on McQuade's body stating that a Union officer is on his way from Washington, D.C. to parley with the Apache chiefs. Vance waylays the officer and takes his place, discovering that Chief Grey Cloud is actually a disgraced former Army general who married an Apache. Gray Cloud knows the real emissary and Britton admits that he is a Confederate officer trying to keep the Apaches out of the war.

A group of Apaches is arrested for McQuade's murder. Gray Cloud allows Vance 24 hours to free the prisoners as the price of keeping the Apaches from joining forces with the Union troops. Still posing as a Yankee officer, Vance goes to the jail in San Gil, where the jailed Apaches tell him that McQuade was killed for selling them defective guns and tainted liquor. He encounters Julie, who angrily rejects his explanation that he jilted her because he chose the Confederacy. Before Vance can arrange the escape of the prisoners or seize a shipment of gold coins being sent east by stagecoach, Jeb returns from searching for the rebels and captures his brother. Vance escapes and reluctantly decides to return to Texas.

Grey Cloud, under a flag of truce, comes to San Gil with his warriors and promises to avoid the white man's war if the prisoners are released, but he is killed by a civilian. Vance and his command learn of the ensuing Apache attack, and he orders his men to charge the Apaches and save the town. After the battle, Julie returns east, promising to reunite with Vance someday. The brothers shake hands before the Confederates ride away.

== Cast ==
- Ronald Reagan as Capt. Vance Britton
- Rhonda Fleming as Julie McQuade
- Bruce Bennett as Colonel Jeb Britton
- Bill Williams as Sergeant Tucker
- Noah Beery Jr. as Sergeant Calhoun
- Hugh Beaumont as Lieutenant Fenton
- Peter Hansen as Lieutenant Crosby
- Lloyd Corrigan as Mr. Delacourt
- John Ridgely as Sam McQuade
- Burt Mustin as Marshal (uncredited)

== Reception ==
In a contemporary review for The New York Times, critic Bosley Crowther wrote: "It seems just a little bit far-fetched that a Confederate captain would jeopardize his troops to save a besieged outpost of the enemy .... Things like that only happen in the movies—in Western movies—and that's what this is."
