= Alaska Highway (film) =

1943 film by Frank McDonald

- Directed by: Frank McDonald; Charles Kerr (assistant)
- Written by: Lewis R. Foster; Maxwell Shane
- Produced by: William H. Pine; William C. Thomas
- Starring: Richard Arlen; Jean Parker; Ralph Sanford
- Cinematography: Fred Jackman Jr.
- Edited by: William H. Ziegler
- Music by: Freddie Rich
- Production company: Pine-Thomas Productions
- Distributed by: Paramount Pictures
- Release date: 1943
- Running time: 66 minutes
- Country: United States
- Language: English

Alaska Highway is a 1943 American drama film directed by Frank McDonald and starring Richard Arlen, Jean Parker, and Ralph Sanford.

== Plot ==
In February 1942 a road construction gang working in Northern California are summoned to a meeting. The boss of the gang, Pop Ormsby, has been commissioned as a Major in the US Army Corps of Engineers and signs up the entire crew with his two sons, Woody and Steve, gaining direct entry as Technical Sergeants to build the Alcan Highway.

Woody wants to enlist in the US Marine Corps to fight the Japanese rather than build another road. He changes his mind when he meets Ann, the daughter of one of the heads of the project, Blair, with the two brothers fighting over her as they build the highway.

Their feud is forgotten when a fire breaks out.

== Cast ==
- Richard Arlen as Woody Ormsby
- Jean Parker as Ann Coswell
- Ralph Sanford as Frosty Gimble
- William Henry as Steve Ormsby
- Joe Sawyer as Roughhouse
- Eddie Quillan as Pompadour "Shorty" Jones
- Jack Wegman as Sergeant Swithers
- Harry Shannon as John "Pop" Ormsby
- Edward Earle as Blair Caswell
- Keith Richards as Hank Lincoln

== Production ==
The script was written in December, when Pine-Thomas renewed their deal with Paramount. At one stage William C. Thomas was going to direct the film.

Pine-Thomas based their film's headquarters in Reno. Filming took place in the Chilkoot Mountains. Filming started 4 January 1943. Release of the film was sped up to take advantage of the Invasion of Attu.
