= Tripoli (film) =

1950 American adventure film directed by Will Price

- Film poster
- Directed by: Will Price
- Screenplay by: Winston Miller
- Story by: Will Price; Winston Miller
- Produced by: William H. Pine; William C. Thomas
- Starring: John Payne; Maureen O'Hara; Howard Da Silva; Phillip Reed; Grant Withers; Lowell Gilmore; Connie Gilchrist
- Cinematography: James Wong Howe
- Edited by: Howard A. Smith
- Music by: Lucien Cailliet
- Production company: Pine-Thomas Productions
- Distributed by: Paramount Pictures
- Release dates: November 9, 1950 (New York); November 30, 1950 (Los Angeles)
- Running time: 95 minutes
- Country: United States
- Language: English
- Box office: $1.6 million

Tripoli is a 1950 American adventure film directed by Will Price, written by Winston Miller and starring John Payne, Maureen O'Hara, Howard Da Silva, Phillip Reed and Grant Withers. The film is a fictionalized account of the April 1805 Battle of Derna pitting the city of Derna, in modern-day Libya, against Tripoli, one of the four Barbary states in North Africa.

The film was released on November 9, 1950 by Paramount Pictures and rereleased by Citation Films as The First Marines.

== Plot ==
In 1805, the USS Essex is part of a blockade of the port of Tripoli by a small United States Navy Mediterranean squadron targeting pirates menacing American shipping. American diplomatic consul William Eaton boards to recruit a small commando squad for a secret mission. Lt. Presley O'Bannon of the U.S. Marine Corps and Lt. John Trippe volunteer to raise a force to seize Derna, a strategic coastal town to the east. Hamet Karamanly, the exiled former pasha of Derna, supplies men in exchange for being restored to his throne, which was usurped by his brother. Countess Sheila D’Arneau stays with the pasha and everyone presumes that she is his mistress, while she persuades him to marry her. O'Bannon recruits a native force of mercenaries, including Greeks, Turks and Arabs to accompany his Marines and some American soldiers and sailors. O'Bannon and Countess D’Arneau meet and are attracted to each other, but both refuse to admit it to themselves.

D’Arneau convinces Hamet that the Americans plan to hand him to his brother, but O’Bannon convinces him to change his mind. D’Arneau defies O’Bannon and accompanies the expedition from Alexandria, Egypt, across the North African deserts, but he forces her to travel with the camp followers. After a waterhole is poisoned, the expedition must cross a dune sea to reach the next waterhole ahead of the poisoners. O’Bannon kisses the countess and the force has to endure a sandstorm. Hamet's brother offers him a deal: half the kingdom in return for expelling the Americans. They reach the coast 12 days late and the American navy squadron under Commodore Samuel Barron is not yet there. There is almost a mutiny before the ships arrives. Hamet tells his brother about the plan of attack on Derna. When the countess learns of this, she rides to warn O’Bannon. He leads a surprise attack on the city and captures it. Lt. O’Bannon and the countess become a couple.

== Cast ==
- John Payne as Lt. Presley O'Bannon, USMC (1776–1850)
- Maureen O'Hara as Countess Sheila D'Arneau
- Howard Da Silva as Capt. Demetrios
- Phillip Reed as Hamet Karamanly
- Grant Withers as Sgt. Derek, USMC
- Lowell Gilmore as Lt. Tripp, USN
- Connie Gilchrist as Henriette
- Alan Napier as Khalil
- Herbert Heyes as American Consul William Eaton, (1764–1811)
- Alberto Morin as Il Taiib
- Emil Hanna as Interpreter
- Grandon Rhodes as Commodore Samuel Barron, (USN, Mediterranean Squadron, 1765–1810)
- Frank Fenton as Capt. Adams, USN
- Rosa Turich as Seewauk
- Ray Hyke as Crawford
- Walter Reed as Wade
- Paul Livermore as Evans
- Gregg Barton as Huggins
- Don Summers as Langley
- Jack Pennick as Busch
- Ewing Mitchell as Elroy

== Production ==
Tripoli is one of several contemporary films about the Barbary War; Universal had released Slave Girl (1947) and Columbia had released Barbary Pirate (1949). Payne and O'Hara had appeared together in To the Shores of Tripoli (1942).

The film was originally titled The Barbarians and was a story by Will Price and Winston Miller. Price, a former Marine, was star Maureen O'Hara's husband. Pine-Thomas Productions bought the story in 1949. It was to have starred Dennis O'Keefe, who had recently appeared in The Eagle and the Hawk for Pine-Thomas, as Presley O'Bannon, but Payne replaced him.

Filming took place over the course of 33 days.

== Reception ==
In a contemporary review for The New York Times, critic Bosley Crowther wrote: "William H. Pine and William C. Thomas, Paramount's bustling 'Dollar Bills,' can obviously take American history in their fanciful, free-wheeling stride. Such a little thing as adherence to historical fact or atmosphere doesn't even begin to restrain them in their rustling up an entertainment film. In 'Tripoli,' a lush adventure drama, ... they have played hob with the War of the Barbary Pirates, but they have brought off a rousing, popular show."

Critic John L. Scott of the Los Angeles Times wrote: "'Tripoli' is a satisfactory derring-do motion picture, although preliminaries leading up to the shooting prove a bit irksome to dyed-in-the-wool action fans."

The film earned $1.6 million in North America.
