= Mr. Reckless =

1948 film by Frank McDonald

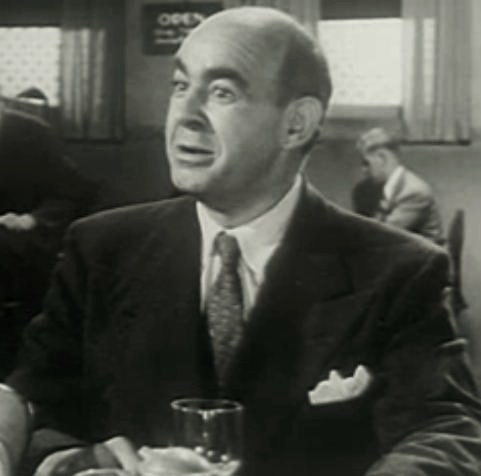
- Nestor Paiva in the film
- Directed by: Frank McDonald
- Written by: Milton Raison (writer); Maxwell Shane (writer)
- Produced by: William H. Pine (producer); William C. Thomas (producer)
- Starring: See below
- Cinematography: Ellis W. Carter
- Edited by: Howard A. Smith
- Music by: Harry Lubin
- Production company: Pine-Thomas Productions
- Distributed by: Paramount Pictures
- Release date: March 26, 1948
- Running time: 66 minutes
- Country: United States
- Language: English

Mr. Reckless is a 1948 American adventure film directed by Frank McDonald.

== Cast ==
- William Eythe as Jeff Lundy
- Barbara Britton as Betty Denton
- Walter Catlett as Joel Hawkins
- Minna Gombell as Ma Hawkins
- Lloyd Corrigan as Hugo Denton
- Nestor Paiva as Gus
- Frank Jenks as Cab Driver
- Ian MacDonald as Jim Halsey
- James Millican as Pete

== Production ==
Pine Thomas Productions purchased the story from Thomas Ahearn in 1946 and hired him to write the script.
