= I Cover Big Town =

1947 film by William C. Thomas

- Theatrical release poster
- Directed by: William C. Thomas
- Screenplay by: Maxwell Shane
- Produced by: William H. Pine; William C. Thomas
- Starring: Phillip Reed; Hillary Brooke; Robert Lowery; Robert Shayne; Mona Barrie; Vince Barnett
- Cinematography: Jack Greenhalgh
- Edited by: Howard A. Smith
- Music by: Darrell Calker
- Production company: Pine-Thomas Productions
- Distributed by: Paramount Pictures
- Release date: February 27, 1947
- Running time: 63 minutes
- Country: United States
- Language: English

I Cover Big Town is a 1947 American drama film directed by William C. Thomas and written by Maxwell Shane. The film stars Phillip Reed, Hillary Brooke, Robert Lowery, Robert Shayne, Mona Barrie and Vince Barnett. It was released on February 27, 1947, by Paramount Pictures and was the second in the Big Town series of films.

== Plot ==
Illustrated Press society editor Lorelei Kilbourne is assigned to a police case. Her crusading newspaper editor Steve Wilson suspects that hard-luck suspect Harry Hilton has been framed on a murder rap. Lorelei and Steve proceed to help the police solve the crime, at the same time uncovering a conspiracy to bring a building firm to bankruptcy.

== Cast ==
- Phillip Reed as Steve Wilson
- Hillary Brooke as Lorelei Kilbourne
- Robert Lowery as Pete Ryan
- Robert Shayne as Chief Tom Blake
- Mona Barrie as Dora Hilton
- Vince Barnett as Louis Murkil
- Louis Jean Heydt as John Moulton
- Frank Wilcox as Harry Hilton
- Leonard Penn as Norden Royal

== Critical reception ==
TV Guide wrote, "It's surprising these journalists have enough time to write their stories."
