= Midnight Manhunt =

1945 film

- DVD cover
- Directed by: William C. Thomas
- Written by: David Lang
- Produced by: Maxwell Shane
- Cinematography: Fred Jackman Jr.
- Edited by: Henry Adams
- Music by: Alexander Laszlo
- Production company: Pine-Thomas Productions
- Distributed by: Paramount Pictures
- Release date: July 24, 1945
- Running time: 64 minutes
- Country: United States
- Language: English

Midnight Manhunt is a 1945 film noir crime film mystery directed by William C. Thomas and written by David Lang. The film premiered on July 24, 1945 and is in the public domain.

The film stars William Gargan, Ann Savage, Leo Gorcey and George Zucco.

== Plot ==
Master criminal Joe Wells is shot and left for dead in his hotel room. Wells rouses himself and wanders into the street before finally expiring in an alley next to a wax museum. Reporter Sue Gallagher, who lives upstairs from the museum, is first on the scene, and conceals the body among the wax exhibits in order to get a scoop. She is soon in competition with fellow reporter Pete Willis. When the museum's caretaker, Clutch, discovers the corpse, he fears a troublesome police inquiry and persuades Mr. Miggs, the elderly museum owner, to help him take it away and dump it in a railyard.

The killer, Jelke, follows the trail of blood from Wells' room to the wax museum, where he confronts Sue. He discovers that she is writing a story about her discovery of Wells' body, and demands to know where she has hidden it. When police arrive at the museum, Jelke knocks Sue unconscious and escapes undetected. After Sue learns where Clutch and Miggs have taken the body, Jelke returns and forces her to accompany him to the railyard. When they arrive the body is missing, having been moved by Pete to prevent Sue from getting the story. After much additional subterfuge, Jelke and the body are turned over to the police. Pete and Sue, who have been increasingly attracted to each other, share credit for the story they give to the newspaper.

== Cast ==
- William Gargan as Pete Willis
- Ann Savage as Sue Gallagher
- Leo Gorcey as Clutch Tracy
- George Zucco as Jelke
- Paul Hurst as Murphy
- Don Beddoe as Det. Lt. Max Hurley
- Charles Halton as Henry Miggs
- George E. Stone as Joe Wells

== Production ==
The film was known as Cheese It, Corpse.
