= Tornado (1943 film) =

1943 film by William A. Berke

- Directed by: William A. Berke
- Written by: Maxwell Shane
- Based on: Black Tornado (novel) by John Guedel
- Produced by: William H. Pine; William C. Thomas
- Starring: Chester Morris; Nancy Kelly
- Cinematography: Fred Jackman Jr.
- Edited by: William H. Ziegler
- Music by: Freddie Rich
- Production company: Pine-Thomas Productions
- Distributed by: Paramount Pictures
- Release date: August 1943
- Running time: 83 minutes
- Country: United States
- Language: English

Tornado is a 1943 American drama film directed by William A. Berke and starring Chester Morris and Nancy Kelly.

== Plot ==
Pete Ramsey (Morris) is a hard-working coal miner who falls in love with and marries scheming showgirl Victory Kane (Kelly). Victory presses Pete to fight for the position of the mine superintendent, which he earns. Still unwilling to bear her poor surroundings and unsatisfied with being a miner's wife, Victory decides to climb the social ladder by having an affair with the wealthy owner of the mine, Gary Linden (Conway), unbeknownst to her faithful husband. Suddenly, a ferocious tornado hits the town and the mine, putting everyone in danger.

== Cast ==
- Chester Morris as Pete Ramsey
- Nancy Kelly as Vactie Kane
- William Henry as Bob Ramsey
- Gwen Kenyon as Sally Vlochek
- Joe Sawyer as Charlie Boswell
- Marie McDonald as Diana Linden
- Morgan Conway as Gary Linden
- Nestor Paiva as Big Joe Vlochek

== Production ==
The film was based on the unpublished novel Black Tornado by John Guedel. (When Guedel was eight years old, his father's factory was destroyed by a tornado.)

In July 1942, Pine-Thomas announced they would make a film of the novel starring their regular male leads, Richard Arlen and Chester Morris, plus Sylvia Sidney. In September 1942 they said Arlen would make the film, which had the working title of Cyclone, after he finished Aerial Gunner. Then in March 1943 it was announced as a vehicle for Morris only, as Black Tornado.

Gail Russell was going to play the role of Sally but then was called in to replace Diana Lynn in a Harry Aldrich film, Henry Aldrich Gets Glamour (1943). Russell was replaced by Gwen Kenyon. Bill Henry was signed off the back of his performance in Pine-Thomas' Alaskan Highway. He later signed a long-term contract with Pine-Thomas.

Nancy Kelly was cast in the female lead. She sang two songs, "Who Done It" and "There Goes My Dream", with music by Frank Loesser and lyrics by Hoagy Carmichael and Frederick Hollander respectively.

Filming took place in April 1943. After the film, Morris signed a deal with Pine Thomas to make three more movies for the company.
