= Forced Landing (1941 film) =

1941 film by Gordon Wiles

- Theatrical poster
- Directed by: Gordon Wiles
- Written by: Edward Churchill; Maxwell Shane
- Produced by: William H. Pine
- Starring: Richard Arlen; Eva Gabor; J. Carrol Naish; Nils Asther; Evelyn Brent
- Cinematography: John Alton
- Edited by: Robert O. Crandall
- Music by: Dimitri Tiomkin
- Production company: Picture Corporation of America
- Distributed by: Paramount Pictures
- Release date: July 11, 1941
- Running time: 67 minutes
- Country: United States
- Language: English
- Budget: $80,000
- Box office: over $540,000

Forced Landing is a 1941 American action film directed by Gordon Wiles and distributed by Paramount Pictures. The film recounts the exploits of a pilot in Mosaque, an imaginary country in the midst of turmoil. Forced Landing stars Richard Arlen, Eva Gabor, J. Carrol Naish, Nils Asther and Evelyn Brent.

== Plot ==
In faraway tropical Mosaque, as soon as American pilot Dan Kendall (Richard Arlen) joins the country's Air Corps, he is in trouble. Along with his mechanic Christmas (Mikhail Rasumny), he is thrown into the military prison. His troubles start at a cantina after buying exotic beauty Johanna Van Deuren (Eva Gabor) a drink, not realizing he has antagonized her fiancé, Colonel Jan Golas (Nils Asther). A fight breaks out, leading to the pilot's arrest.

Colonel Golas releases Dan from prison when he learns that his fiancée had nearly been run down by a car and Dan had come to her rescue. The bargain he makes with Dan is that the stranger has to resign from the military and take a job with the Mosaque Civil Airline. Golas has an ulterior motive for helping Dan, as he has been responsible for the airline being sabotaged on its last flights to bring payrolls to workers at the local fort. Unknown to him, Dan's pilot friend Petchnikoff (Harold Goodwin) lost his life in a crash engineered by Golas. Johanna, accompanied by Dan, flies to the fort to visit her sick father (Victor Varconi), only to find the disgruntled and penniless workers there are set to revolt.

Dan promises to have their pay flown to the workers within three days. When he spots his friend's aircraft on the ground, after landing and searching for Petchnikoff, Dan and Johanna are captured by Andros Banshek (J. Carrol Naish), a bandit who has been working against the government in Mosaque. Banshek is sure the two would reveal his hideout unless they are silenced. When Banshek's son Nando (Bobby Dillon) is shot during their attempt to escape, Banshek implores Dan to fly his son to a doctor. While Nando is saved, Banshek is captured in Mosaque and killed by the police.

Workers at the fort finally revolt, forcing Golas to react. Dan will fly with the payroll while Golas will fly as an escort. Johanna, afraid her father is in danger, stows away on Dan's aircraft. She is alarmed that the box containing the payroll is smoking. Dan dumps the box out of the aircraft just as it explodes. Golas then tries to shoot down Dan's aircraft but is himself downed by a box of metal parts that Dan throws out. When Golas crashes to his death, Dan brings the workers their pay and is able to quell the rebellion. The general (John Miljan) in charge of the military, absolves Banshek of his crimes and declares that he was a true patriot. Dan marries Johanna, with the newlyweds leaving Mosaque to go to the United States.

== Cast ==
- Richard Arlen as Dan Kendall
- Eva Gabor as Johanna Van Deuren (Note: Eva Gabor made her film debut in Forced Landing.)
- J. Carrol Naish as Andros Banshek
- Nils Asther as Colonel Jan Golas
- Evelyn Brent as Doctor's housekeeper
- Mikhail Rasumny as Christmas
- Victor Varconi as Hendrick Van Deuren
- John Miljan as The General
- Frank Yaconelli as Zomar, the grocer
- Harold Goodwin as Petchnikoff
- Thornton Edwards as Felig, rebel lieutenant
- Bobby Dillon as Nando Banshek
- John Gallaudet as Major Xanders
- Philip Churchill as Nick
- Harry J. Worth as Dr. Vidalek

== Production ==
Forced Landing was the second from Pine-Thomas Productions, whose first three films were all aviation dramas starring Richard Arlen. The film was shot over 12 days but involved 10 weeks of planning and three weeks of rehearsal to enable specially designed sets and a speedy shoot.

Principal photography for Forced Landing took place from April 18 to early May 1941 at the Fine Arts Studios in California.

The aerial scenes in Forced Landing were a mix of studio footage and live action, including the opening scene that incorporated the fiery crash of a Ford Trimotor from Only Angels Have Wings (1939). New aerial sequences were flown by Garland Lincoln, a pilot and supplier of aircraft for motion picture work, along with pilots Herb White, Richard Probert and Joel Thorne. The climactic air duel is fought between an armed Culver Dart G and a Pilgrim 100 airliner.

The film "...was the first in a series of three Pine-Thomas war adventures ('Forced Landing', 'Flying Blind' and 'Submarine Alert') featuring Asther as a villainous European trying to steal American military secrets, only to be thwarted by a heroic Richard Arlen."

== Reception ==
Forced Landing earned over six times its cost. The Los Angeles Times called it an "effective melodrama".
