= Minesweeper (film) =

1943 film by William A. Berke

- Theatrical release poster
- Directed by: William Berke
- Written by: Edward T. Lowe Jr.; Maxwell Shane
- Based on: original story by Lowe & Shane
- Produced by: William H. Pine; William C. Thomas
- Starring: Richard Arlen; Jean Parker; Russell Hayden
- Cinematography: Fred Jackman Jr.
- Edited by: Ted Bellinger; Howard A. Smith; William H. Ziegler
- Music by: Mort Glickman
- Production company: Pine-Thomas Productions
- Distributed by: Paramount Pictures
- Release date: November 10, 1943
- Running time: 67 minutes
- Country: United States
- Language: English

Minesweeper is a 1943 American black-and-white World War II film, produced by William H. Pine and William C. Thomas, directed by William A. Berke, that stars Richard Arlen, Jean Parker, and Russell Hayden. The film was distributed by Paramount Pictures. A former navy deserter returns to duty after the attack on Pearl Harbor under an assumed name as a sailor aboard a minesweeper.

== Plot ==
Lieutenant Richard Houston is an officer in the U.S. Navy who deserted during peacetime service to escape gambling debts, and took up life as a hobo. The Japanese attack on Pearl Harbor spurs him to rejoin the Navy under the assumed name of Jim "Tennessee" Smith. Houston is assigned to serve aboard a minesweeper, where he carries out numerous successful efforts to defuse mines in the San Diego harbor while struggling to keep his identity secret.

Complicating matters, Houston gets involved in a love triangle, competing with Seaman Elliot Nash for the affections of Mary Smith, niece of Chief Petty Officer "Fixit" Smith, who has taken a liking to Houston. Later, while gambling, Houston overstays his shore leave and Smith, having taken over his position, is killed by a mine.

Confessing to Mary that he was out gambling to get the money to buy an engagement ring, Houston is crestfallen that by being AWOL, he was responsible for the death of his friend. Houston nearly deserts again, but instead returns to his base to take on one last mission. Reporting back to duty, he finds that his immediate superior, Lieutenant Ralph Gilpin, has discovered his true identity. Nonetheless, even as a "prisoner-at-large", Houston volunteers to help clear the shipping lanes of mines to ensure a troop ship can safely leave the harbor to join a convoy off to the Pacific.

When Houston and Nash dive in San Diego harbor to find a Japanese mine, the two divers see that the mine reacts to the sound of an aircraft overhead, beginning to rise from its tethered location as the sound waves reach it. Nash relays the information to Gilpin on the diving launch, but Houston cuts Nash's oxygen line, forcing the crew on the launch to pull him up to safety. Working on his own, Houston attempts to open the control panel when the mine explodes, killing him. On board the launch, Nash tells the crew that Houston was a true hero.

Gilpin realizes that he can counter the threat of the mines by flying aircraft low over the water, where they can be blown up after they rise to the surface. Looking at the cable he received about the deserter, he tears it up and drops it overboard.

A Consolidated PBY Catalina flying at low level triggers the release of the acoustically sensitive mines in San Diego harbor, allowing the minesweepers to blow up each mine. As the operation finishes, the Secretary of the Navy sends a message indicating that the Navy and Marine Corps Medal has been posthumously bestowed on Gunner's Mate First Class James Smith, United States Naval Reserve.

== Cast ==
- Richard Arlen as Richard Houston - posing as Jim "Tennessee" Smith
- Jean Parker as Mary Smith
- Russell Hayden as Seaman Elliot Nash
- Guinn "Big Boy" Williams as CPO Ichabod Ferdinand "Fixit" Smith
- Emma Dunn as Mom Smith
- Charles D. Brown as Commander Lane
- Frank Fenton as Lt. Ralph Gilpin
- Chick Chandler as Seaman "Corny" Welch
- Douglas Fowley as Cutter Lieutenant Wells
- Billy Nelson as Bos'un "Freshwater" Heims
- Grant Withers as CPO Gregg, In Charge of Diving Crew
- Dub Taylor as Seaman Stubby Gordon (uncredited)
- Jon Gilbreath (uncredited)

(Note: Robert Mitchum is uncredited as Seaman Chuck Ryan who, along with Seaman "Corny" Welch, dies in a boat explosion early in the film.)

== Production ==
The film was going to be directed by William Thomas, who had been unable to make his directorial debut in Alaskan Highway. However, William Berke wound up directing the film.

Principal photography on Minesweeper took place from May 3 to late May 1943. According to a June 23, 1943 news item in The Hollywood Reporter, underwater scenes were shot off of Santa Catalina Island, California, in June 1943.

This was Arlen's second-to-last film under his contract with Pine-Thomas.

The day that Williams filmed his death scene, he had received notice that his nephew, Byron Andrews, had been killed in action in the South Pacific.

In the opening credits, the following acknowledgment appears: "The producers wish to thank the Navy Department for their cooperation in making possible the filming of this picture – and to express especial appreciation to Commander Louis H. Gwinn, U.S.N.R., commanding officer of the Naval Operating Base Terminal Island whose technical aid and advice were of the utmost assistance". According to the information in the Paramount Script Collection at the AMPAS Library, Comm. Gwinn also contributed to the original screenplay.

The minesweeper used during filming was YMS 121. Laid down in 1941, she was struck from the Navy Register on July 3, 1946, and transferred to the War Shipping Administration in March 1947. Her eventual fate is unknown.

== Reception ==
Minesweeper was primarily a B film, and although simulated combat scenes were notable, other scenes fell short in other aspects. As an example of Hollywood's relentless wartime efforts to portray all the fighting units of the U.S. military in a film, Minesweeper was unique in being the only film depicting the specialized work of minesweeping. A May 21, 1943 news item appearing in The Hollywood Reporter, noted that actor Jon Gilbreath, who appeared in the film, was a Minesweeper Training Officer for the 12th Naval District during World War II.

In June 1943 Pine-Thomas signed Hayden to a three-film contract in order to team with Chester Morris; Hayden would be taking roles originally meant for Arlen.
