= Dark Mountain (film) =

1944 film by William A. Berke

- Directed by: William Berke
- Written by: Maxwell Shane
- Story by: Paul Franklin; Charles F. Royal
- Produced by: William H. Pine (producer); William C. Thomas (producer)
- Starring: Robert Lowery
- Cinematography: Fred Jackman Jr.
- Edited by: Henry Adams
- Music by: Willy Stahl
- Production company: Pine-Thomas Productions
- Distributed by: Paramount Pictures
- Release date: September 1944
- Running time: 56 minutes
- Country: United States
- Language: English

Dark Mountain is a 1944 American film noir crime film directed by William Berke. It is also known as Thunderbolt and Thunder Mountain.

== Plot Summary ==
When forest ranger Don Bradley manages to rescue two horses from burning to death inside a building during a forest fire, he gets promoted to head of the Dark Mountain area. His friend Willie gets to follow him as his assistant.

His first week off Don goes to see his girlfriend Kay and asks her to marry him, but she tells him she can't, since she just married a merchant named Steve Downey. Crushed, Don returns to Dark Mountain.

Kay finds out that the man she married is a racketeer, operating on the black market. One day a government agent, Dave Lewis, arrives to investigate Steve's business. He is killed by one of Steve's goons, and the body dropped in the middle of the road, to make it look like he has been accidentally run over.

Kay decides to leave her husband, but he doesn't let her go. She is present and witness to when Steve kills one of his own men that he suspects have told the police about the operation. Steve then flees and brings Kay with him. He tells her that she is a criminal too, being an accomplice in the racketeering since her name is on the contract for his warehouse.

When Steve decides they will split up to more easily get away from the police, Kay goes to Don for protection and advice. He gives her shelter in one of the mountain cabins but tells her to go to police as soon as possible.

Steve manages to track Kay to the mountain cabin and tells Kay he will kill her if she reveals to anyone that he is there. Don brings Kay food every day, and soon realizes that she is not alone in the cabin.

Don and Willie plan a trap to catch Steve without risking to harm Kay. Over the short wave radio, they send a fake message that the police believe they are closing in on the fugitive near the Mexican border, to lure Steve out of hiding. Steve leaves the cabin, but he brings Kay with him again. He steals Don's truck, full of explosives, and drives off. Willie's dog catches up with the truck shortly after they leave and jumps in; he starts attacking Steve during the drive.

While the truck is still moving, Kay and the dog jump out through a door, and Willie flattens the tires with his gun. The truck goes off the road and explodes with Steve still in it. Kay throws herself in Don's arms and they are reunited.

== Cast ==
- Robert Lowery as Don Bradley
- Ellen Drew as Kay Downey
- Regis Toomey as Steve Downey
- Eddie Quillan as Willie Dinsmire
- Elisha Cook Jr. as Whitey
- Ralph Dunn as Chief Sanford
- Walter Baldwin as Uncle Sam Bates
- Rose Plumer as Aunt Pattie Bates
- Virginia Sale as Aletha Bates
- Byron Foulger as Harvey Bates
- Johnny Fisher as Hunk, Henchman
- Alex Callam as Detective Dave Lewis
- Eddie Kane as Waiter
- Angelo Desfis as Bookkeeper

== Production ==
The film was based on an original script called Thunder Mountain by Dean Franklin and Charles Royal. It bought by Pine-Thomas Productions in January 1944 as a vehicle for Chester Morris. Morris however went into a film at Columbia, The Adventure of Jim Burke and was replaced by Regis Toomey. Helen Walker was going to play the female lead but she went into Abroad with Two Yanks and was replaced by Ellen Drew.It was Ellen Drew's first film for a while.

Dick Purcell died of a heart attack shortly before he was supposed to make the film. He was replaced by Carroll Nye who had made the short Soldiers of the Soil for Pine Thomas.

Filming started 9 April 1944.

== See also ==
- List of American films of 1944
