= Pine-Thomas Productions =

Unit of Paramount Pictures

Pine-Thomas Productions was a prolific B-picture unit of Paramount Pictures from 1940 to 1957, producing 81 films. Co-producers William H. Pine (February 15, 1896 – April 29, 1955) and William C. Thomas (August 11, 1903 – April 2, 1984) were known as the "Dollar Bills" because none of their economically made films ever lost money. "We don't want to make million dollar pictures," they said. "We just want to make a million dollars."

== History ==
=== William Pine and William Thomas ===
William Pine was a graduate of Columbia University who went to work as a publicist at Paramount in 1933 becoming head of publicity. He became an associate director for Cecil B. De Mille at the studio and worked on several films.

William Thomas was also a publicist who was working at Paramount producing "B" movies. Pine and Thomas struck up a partnership and swapped theories about how films could be produced for lower budgets.

=== First Three Films: Picture Corporation of America ===
Pine and Thomas talked with Richard Arlen, who had become famous with Wings (1927) but whose most recent films had been lower budgeted productions. Arlen, who owned several planes and ran an aviation school, suggested they make an aviation film; he offered himself and his aircraft for a movie. Pine and Thomas selected three titles, Power Dive, Forced Landing and Flying Blind, and wrote scripts around them. (The producers later called these "Westerns of the air".) They approached Paramount and said they had a star and three scripts and asked for a distribution deal. Paramount were looking for some low-budget action movies and agreed, enabling Pine and Thomas to gain loans from the bank to finance the films. The other key elements of the team were Maxwell Shane, a writer, and Doc Merman, a production manager.

Power Drive (1941), starring Arlen and Jean Parker was made in ten days at a cost of $86,000 under the auspices of "Picture Corporation of America". Thomas produced the first film while Pine worked more an associate - he worked for Cecil B. De Mille. It earned almost a million dollars. Pine and Thomas saved money by shooting on location.

Their second film, Forced Landing (1941) was another aviation film with Arlen; Eva Gabor made her debut. Arlen and Parker were in their third film, Flying Blind (1941), which was directed by John McDonald who would helm many of the company's early films.

All three films cost under $90,000 and returned six times its negative cost. Paramount were so pleased with these results they offered to finance the duo's films from then on.

=== Pine-Thomas Productions: Chester Morris Joins Company ===
In June 1941, Pine and Thomas signed a six-picture deal with Paramount, three to star Richard Arlen and three to star Chester Morris. The Picture Corporation of America was dissolved and from this point on the company would be known as Pine-Thomas Productions.

Morris' first film for the company was No Hands on the Clock (1941), based on a novel by "Geoffrey Holmes" (Daniel Mainwaring). It was the first of three novels by Mainwaring which they optioned.

Pine-Thomas' early films focused on industry and aviation, areas not often dealt with in the movies. According to The New York Times: "The plots were usually built around a hazardous occupation, like deep-sea diving parachute jumping or auto car racing - and someone was always killed doing that particular job in the first reel to get the idea across." The screenwriters on their films often had to participate in the activities they were writing about.

They kept costs down by careful scripting and budgeting, use of location filming for production value, and employing stars whose careers were in decline such as Arlen and Chester Morris - so they still had name recognition for the public but did not cost much to employ. They did not employ any permanent staff apart from themselves and one secretary, hiring people on a picture-by-picture basis.

The advent of World War Two saw Pine-Thomas go into military stories, although with action always at the forefront. Arlen's fourth film for the company Torpedo Boat (1942) was directed by John Rawlins, who became another key director for the company. The female lead, Jean Parker, frequently appeared in the early films.

Arlen was in Wildcat (1942) and Morris did I Live on Danger (1942) then both were teamed in Wrecking Crew (1942).

In March 1942, Pine-Thomas signed a contract to make six more films for Paramount. Variety said "the pair have shown showman's flair for turning out thrill-heavy action dramas. They have consistently led their production classification in BO returns." Arlen signed a deal with Pine Thomas to make four more films.

Pine-Thomas made four propaganda shorts including A Letter from Bataan (1942), which featured Arlen and a young Susan Hayward. William Pine directed these. Pine made his feature debut as director with Aerial Gunner (1942), which reteamed Arlen and Morris.

Morris then made High Explosive (1943) and Tornado (1943), and signed another three-picture contract.

=== Renewed Deal with Paramount ===
By December 1942, the company had made 11 films. They announced they had renewed their deal with Paramount and would make one "A" film a year. However, this did not happen for a number of years.

Their first film under the new deal was Alaska Highway (1943) with Arlen. The star was also in Submarine Alert (1943), Minesweeper (1943) and Timber Queen (1944). Arlen then left the company for some years.

In July 1943 Variety reported that Pine-Thomas films had an average gross in excess of $500,000.

In June 1943, Pine-Thomas signed a new contract with Paramount which included three musicals, and two bigger budgeted pictures, plus three wartime movies which would co-star Chester Morris and Russell Hayden as a team (replacing Morris and Richard Arlen). Jack Haley was signed to appear in two of the musicals with Mary Beth Hughes (see below).

Morris and Arlen were in Gambler's Choice (1944), a bigger budgeted period film. However, for Morris' next film, Double Exposure (1944) he was teamed with Philip Terry.

=== Robert Lowery ===
Pine-Thomas signed a contract with Robert Lowery who was in The Navy Way (1944), Dark Mountain (1944), Dangerous Passage (1944), High Powered (1945), They Made Me a Killer (1946), Danger Street (1947), some of the Big Town series (see below), and Jungle Flight (1947).

Some of these films were written by Daniel Mainwaring who later recalled: "Bill Thomas of Pine and Thomas, who made very small and very bad pictures at Paramount, gave me my first real screenwriting job. I wrote six pictures in one year, all of which I'd just as soon forget except Big Town [1947]. At the end of the year, I fled to the hills and wrote Build My Gallows High."

=== Jack Haley ===
In 1944, the partnership signed Jack Haley to a multi-picture contract. This meant the company moved into comedies for the first time with Take It Big (1944), followed by One Body Too Many (1944) with Bela Lugosi, Scared Stiff (1945) and People Are Funny (1946).

Also in 1944 they signed a three-picture contract with Johnny Weissmuller, whose Sol Lesser RKO Pictures contract led him to make other films. However, he only made one film for them, Swamp Fire (1946) with fellow former Tarzan Buster Crabbe.

=== William Gargan ===
William Gargan signed with the company and starred in Midnight Manhunt (1945), Follow That Woman (1945), Hot Cargo (1946), Waterfront at Midnight (1947) and Dynamite (1949).

Other stars for the company included Byron Barr (Tokyo Rose (1946)), Richard Denning (Seven Were Saved (1947), Caged Fury (1948), Disaster (1948)), William Eythe (Mr. Reckless, Special Agent (1949)).

Arlen returned to the company briefly to appear in Speed to Spare (1948).

=== Big Town Series ===
Pine Thomas decided to make a film based on the radio show Big Town. Big Town (1947) starring Phillip Reed and Lowery was popular enough for three sequels: I Cover Big Town (1947), Big Town After Dark (1948) and Big Town Scandal (1948). The series was shelved after four films were made but only the first two released.

In June 1947, Paramount announced Pine-Thomas would make eight films for them over the coming year.

Pine and Thomas were both directing films by this stage. Shane made his directorial debut with Fear in the Night (1947) with Paul Kelly.

In a 1947 interview, Pine said, "We're not geniuses by a long shot and we don't propose to tell the industry how to make pictures. We're just a couple of businessmen who've learned by long experience how to put pictures together to achieve what we consider a maximum amount of entertainment at a minimum cost."

Pine said they usually had six scripts ready for production "at a moment's notice. That gives flexibility to our schedule." They also liked if possible to reuse sets on films. If a script was sent in, they would go over it with their production manager Doc Merman and inhouse writer to see if it was feasible to make. Background footage was important - they would often film this with a skeleton crew and using doubles which could substitute for the main cast. The cast was the last thing the producers would pick, once they knew how long the actors would be needed for. If they needed a star for only a week "we can afford to get a fairly big name and pay him well" said Pine. But if they needed someone for longer, they got a less expensive star. They did prefer to hire lead actors with some name recognition but would hire experienced bit players so they would not hold up production.

Pine said they often got ideas from the newspapers. They did not make many murder mysteries because the majors did them and they did not want to compete.

Pine says he and Thomas were paid out of the profits of their films. "Some day I believe the whole industry will get around to working as units," said Pine. He said thirty percent of their business came from England.

=== Rising Budgets ===
After World War Two, television began to make inroads into Pine-Thomas' market, and costs were rising without a corresponding match in returns - for instance, Dynamite (1948) cost $200,000. Pine-Thomas said their average take from a "B" was $450,000 worldwide and $350,000 in the US. However, they said about once a year, one film would exceed expectations.

Pine-Thomas experimented with increasing their budgets. They made Shaggy (1948) with Brenda Joyce and Adventure Island (1947) with Rory Calhoun and Rhonda Fleming, both borrowed from David O. Selznick. The budgets for these were between $250,000-$300,000 and they were both shot in Cinecolor.

Eventually Pine-Thomas dropped their lower budgeted films altogether and went into movies where the budget was $750,000 to $1 million. In 1948, Pine said, "We're going to sink the extra dough into where it will show. Into bigger stars, better stories and more production."

Pine felt that if a film's budget was less than $750,000:

You can't get the star power and values into a film. Above that figure of course you have your worries on whether the big nut can be paid off on box office returns. On the cheapies the salesman has to beat harder to sell and the cost of distribution is no less than on the more expensive product ... We compared our profit on the basis of per dollar invested and came up with a finding that it would pay to spend more on each film ... These Bs are just as hard to make as As, particularly as you can't buy books or plays for them.

In 1946, they formed a company, Clarion, with the goal of making more expensive films. Clarion's first movie was a Western, Albuquerque (1948), starring Randolph Scott which cost $728,000 and made around $2 million. It led to a contract with Paramount to make three "A" films a year.

Pine-Thomas' first million dollar movie was the Western El Paso (1949) starring John Payne, Sterling Hayden and Gail Russell, and directed by Lewis R. Foster. "We've got people working in this one who two years ago wouldn't have been caught dead in a Pine-Thomas picture," said Thomas. He added, "in the old days, all we had to do was get a guy blown up in an oil well explosion and go from there, but now, when we want to kill someone, we've got to have a good reason."

Forster also directed Manhandled (1949) which starred Hayden, Dorothy Lamour and Dan Duryea.

=== John Payne ===
El Paso was a success, earning $2 million. Manhandled was more "troublesome" at the box office.

Pine-Thomas put Payne in two more films directed by Foster: Captain China (1950) with Russell, and The Eagle and the Hawk (1950) with Rhonda Fleming. Pine-Thomas liked the films and signed another three-picture deal with the actor all to be filmed in Technicolor. These films were Tripoli (1950) with Maureen O'Hara, Passage West (1951) and Crosswinds (1951).

=== Into the 1950s ===
In May 1951, Pine-Thomas signed a two-year extension on their Paramount deal, to make a minimum of eight films over 1952 and 1953, including three in Technicolor: High Tension, Gentleman of the Jungle and The Rebel.

They also signed a new contract with John Payne to make six films over three years. These were Caribbean Gold (1952), The Blazing Forest (1952), The Vanquished (1953, originally The Rebel), and Hell's Island (1955). Caribbean Gold co-starred Arlene Dahl who signed a three-picture contract with the company.

Joseph Losey directed The Lawless (1950) with Russell and MacDonald Carey. This was an attempt from Pine-Thomas to make more a more "significant" movie. Pine-Thomas were worried about rising costs but did not see salary slashing as the answer. They felt the solution to keep budgets manageable was to script carefully so only what is shot gets on screen. "The writer is the most important guy in Hollywood," said Pine. "Producers and directors don't like me for saying this but it's true. With the right script you can do wonders."

Pine said at this stage they would make all their films in color, which he estimated added $500,000 to domestic take. He said budgets would range from $600,000 to $1 million.

=== Ronald Reagan and Rhonda Fleming ===
Ronald Reagan signed a contract with the company and appeared in The Last Outpost (1951) with Fleming. They were reteamed on Hong Kong (1951) and Tropic Zone (1952).

In March 1952, Pine Thomas claimed they read around thirty stories a week in order to find the four they made for Paramount annually. They would submit a synopsis of the stories they liked to 20-30 theatre owners around the country to see how they react. "If the theatre men say they think their patrons would like to see the story filmed, we purchase it," they said. "If not, we reject it, We keep in touch with the public that way."

By this stage they made all their films in color. They also had a policy to introduce one new player per film, such as Susan Morrow in Blazing Forest and Danny Chang in Hong Kong. They were increasingly aiming at the bigger budgeted area.

"Their format is standard for many pictures produced in Hollywood," wrote Hedda Hopper in 1952.

Ray Milland starred in Jamaica Run (1953) and Fernando Lamas and Fleming in Sangaree (1953) and Jivaro (1954).

The company made its first (and only) musical, Those Redheads from Seattle (1953) with Fleming.

Stories they bought but did not make around this time include The Rebel, High Tension and Command Decision.

In 1953, Pine claimed the team did not follow any formula. "If there are any rules," he said, "you can bet we don't make them in Hollywood ... Each picture has to be approached as an individual project. Every time we start a picture we try to get all the plus-factors we can before starting."

=== Final Films for Paramount ===
By August 1953, the producers had made 73 films and earned Paramount over $100,000,000. However, television was leading to their market declining, with the result they suspended operations to re-think strategy. "You either hit big now or you don't hit at all," they said. "We had to think things out. You don't just say shoot the works and let it go at that. Stories are not easy to find." In February 1954 they announced they would only make big budget "A" films.

"Times and the market have changed," said Thomas. "We don't want anyone to think that this means we are switching away from our approach to providing film entertainment. We still want to make commercial pictures, not artistic ones. However, it's no longer commercial to make the kind of pictures we've been making."

"It doesn't pay to take a chance in today's market on limited budget pictures." Pine said, "you can get nickel-and-dimed to death. So we are going to make pictures for whatever they require to be made."

They produced three: Run for Cover with James Cagney directed by Nicholas Ray; The Far Horizons (1955) with Fred MacMurray and Charlton Heston; and Lucy Gallant (1955) with Heston and Jane Wyman. They also did a lower budgeted Payne film, Hell's Island. The cost of these four films was $6 million, double the cost of Pine-Thomas' previous annual output.

=== United Artists ===
In December 1954, after making Lucy Gallant, Pine-Thomas announced the end of their relationship with Paramount after 77 films over 14 years. Pine declared that the "opportunity for the creative independent producer is the greatest in the history of the business. The sought-after stars, directors and writers are only interested in associating themselves with distinguished projects, regardless of whether these projects are controlled by an independent or major company." Pine said the company's new method of operation would be to set the screenplay, stars and director before seeking finance.

In 1955, Paramount sold 35 Pine-Thomas films to Associated Artists Productions for showing on American television. The cost was around $1 million.

In January 1955, Pine-Thomas signed a contract with United Artists to make three films, The Big Caper, Lincoln McKeever and The Mountains Have No Shadows.

=== Pine-Thomas-Shane ===
In April, William Pine died of a heart attack. Two months later the company became Pine-Thomas-Shane, with Maxwell Shane becoming a partner. Pine's son Howard joined the company.

Pine-Thomas-Shane made several films for United Artists: Nightmare (1956), a remake of Fear in the Night with Edward G. Robinson; The Big Caper (1957) with Rory Calhoun; and Bailout at 43,000 (1957) with Payne. They also made two pilots, Johnny Pilgrim and Outposts. Then in 1956 Shane took a contract to produce at Universal.

The following year, Howard Pine went to Universal-International and the company wound up. Lincoln McKeever was sold off to other producers. Thomas announced he would make The Calender Epic and Key Witness solo.

=== Television pilots ===
In 1956 the Dollar Bills produced three unsuccessful television pilots; Outpost a Western about the U.S. Cavalry starring Lex Barker, Johnny Pilgrim, a private eye show starring William Bishop and Court-Martial featuring recreations of actual military judicial proceedings.

=== Later Films ===
William Thomas produced three more films in the late 1970s.

== Select filmography ==
=== Released by Paramount ===
| Release date | Title | Stars | Writer | Director | Notes |
|---|---|---|---|---|---|
| May 28, 1941 | Power Dive | Richard Arlen, Jean Parker, Don Castle | Maxwell Shane, Edward Churchill | James P Hogan | Story by Paul Franklin. Made for "Picture Corporation of America" |
| July 11, 1941 | Forced Landing | Richard Arlen, Eva Gabor, Nils Asther, J. Carroll Naish | Maxwell Shane, Edward Churchill | Gordon Wiles | Music by Dimitri Tiomkin. Made for Picture Corporation of America |
| August 29, 1941 | Flying Blind | Richard Arlen, Jean Parker, Dick Purcell, Nils Asther, Marie Wilson | Maxwell Shane, Richard Murphy | Frank McDonald | Made for Picture Corporation of America |
| December 1, 1941 | No Hands on the Clock | Chester Morris, Jean Parker, Dick Purcell, Rod Cameron | Maxwell Shane | Frank McDonald | Based on novel by Daniel Mainwaring (as "Geoffrey Homes"). |
| January 24, 1942 | Torpedo Boat | Richard Arlen, Jean Parker, Phillip Terry, Dick Purcell | Maxwell Shane | John Rawlins | Story by Paul Franklin & Aaron Gottlieb |
| June 16, 1942 | I Live on Danger | Chester Morris, Jean Parker, Dick Purcell | Lewis R. Foster, Richard Murphy, Maxwell Shane | Sam White | based on story by Foster & Alex Gottlieb |
| September 3, 1942 | Wildcat | Richard Arlen, Arline Judge, Buster Crabbe, William Frawley, Arthur Hunnicutt, Elisha Cook Jr, Ralph Sanford | Maxwell Shane, Richard Murphy | Frank McDonald | Based on story by North Bigbee |
| November 7, 1942 | Wrecking Crew | Chester Morris, Jean Parker, Richard Arlen | Maxwell Shane, Richard Murphy | Frank McDonald | Based on story by Robert T. Shannon & Mauri Grashin |
| March 27, 1943 | High Explosive | Chester Morris, Jean Parker, Barry Sullivan, Dick Purcell, Ralph Sanford | Maxwell Shane, Howard Green | Frank McDonald | Based on story by Joseph Hoffman |
| May 9, 1943 | Aerial Gunner | Chester Morris, Richard Arlen, Jimmy Lydon, Dick Purcell | Maxwell Shane | William Pine | Based on an idea by Jack Davies. Pine's first feature as director. Robert Mitchum has small role. Filmed at Harlingen Air Force Base. |
| June 24, 1943 | Alaska Highway | Richard Arlen, Jean Parker, William Henry, Ralph Sanford | Maxwell Shane, Lewis Foster | Frank McDonald | |
| June 28, 1943 | Submarine Alert | Richard Arlen, Wendy Barrie, Nils Asther, Ralph Sanford | Maxwell Shane | Frank McDonald | Release delayed for a year |
| August 1943 | Tornado | Chester Morris, Nancy Kelly, William Henry | Maxwell Shane | William A. Berke | Based on novel by John Guedel |
| November 10, 1943 | Minesweeper | Richard Arlen, Jean Parker, Russell Hayden, Guinn "Big Boy" Williams | Maxwell Shane, Edward T. Lowe | William Berke | |
| January 13, 1944 | Timber Queen | Richard Arlen, Mary Beth Hughes, June Havoc, Dick Purcell | Maxwell Shane, Edward Lowe | Frank McDonald | |
| February 25, 1944 | The Navy Way | Robert Lowery, Jean Parker, William Henry | Maxwell Shane | William Berke | Filmed at Naval Station Great Lakes. |
| April 27, 1944 | Gambler's Choice | Chester Morris, Nancy Kelly, Russell Hayden | Maxwell Shane, Irving Reis | Frank McDonald | Based on a story by James Edward Grant, Howard Emmett Rogers |
| June 9, 1944 | Take It Big | Jack Haley, Harriet Hilliard, Mary Beth Hughes, Arline Judge | Howard Green & Joe Bigalow | Frank McDonald | First musical. Appearance by Ozzie Nelson. |
| September 1944 | Dark Mountain | Robert Lowery, Ellen Drew, Regis Toomey, Elisha Cook Jr | Maxwell Shane | William Berke | Story by Paul Franklin, Charles F. Royal |
| November 24, 1944 | One Body Too Many | Jack Haley, Jean Parker, Bela Lugosi | Maxwell Shane, Winston Miller | Frank McDonald | |
| December 18, 1944 | Double Exposure | Chester Morris, Nancy Kelly, Phillip Terrt | Maxwell Shane, Winston Miller | William Berke | Based on story by Miller, Ralph Graves |
| December 18, 1944 | Dangerous Passage | Robert Lowery, Phyllis Brooks, Jack La Rue | Daniel Manwaring | William Berke | |
| February 1945 | High Powered | Robert Lowery, Phyllis Brooks, Mary Tree, Ralph Sanford | Maxwell Shane | William Berke | Story by Milton Raison |
| Jun 22, 1945 | Scared Stiff | Jack Haley, Ann Savage, Barton MacLane, Veda Ann Borg | Daniel Mainwaring, Maxwell Shane | Frank McDonald | Aka You'll Be the Death of Me Yet; retitled Treasure of Fear when sold to television. |
| Jul 24, 1945 | Midnight Manhunt | William Gargan, Ann Savage, Leo Gorcey, George Zucco | David Lang | William Thomas | |
| Dec 14, 1945 | Follow That Woman | William Gargan, Nancy Kelly, Regis Toomey, Byron Barr | Maxwell Shane, Winston Miller, Ben Perry | Lew Landers | |
| Jan 11, 1946 | People Are Funny | Jack Haley, Helen Walker, Rudy Vallee, Ozzie Nelson, Philip Reed | Maxwell Shane | Sam White | Story by David Lang. Based on radio show by Jack Guedel (played in film by Philip Reed). Cameos by Art Linkletter, Frances Langford |
| Feb 8, 1946 | Tokyo Rose | Byron Barr, Keye Luke, Osa Massen | Daniel Mainwaring, Maxwell Shane | Lew Landers | |
| May 3, 1946 | They Made Me a Killer | Robert Lowery, Barbara Britton, Lola Lane, Byron Barr, Ralph Sanford | Daniel Mainwaring, Winston Miller, Kae Salkow | William Thomas | Story by Owen Franes |
| Jun 28, 1946 | Hot Cargo | William Gargan, Jean Rogers, Phillip Reed | Daniel Mainwaring | Lew Landers | |
| Sep 6, 1946 | Swamp Fire | Johnny Weissmuller, Buster Crabbe, Virginia Grey | Daniel Mainwaring | William Pine | David Janssen has small role |
| Mar 28, 1947 | Seven Were Saved | Richard Denning, Catherine Craig, Russell Hayden | Maxwell Shane, Juliam Harmon | William Pine | |
| May 23, 1947 | Big Town | Phil Reed, Hillary Brooke, Robert Lowery, Veda Ann Borg, Byron Barr | Daniel Mainwaring, Maxwell Shane | William Thomas | Based on the radio show |
| Feb 27, 1947 | I Cover Big Town | Phil Reed, Hillary Brooke, Robert Lowery | Maxwell Shane | William Thomas | sequel to Big Town |
| Apr 18, 1947 | Fear in the Night | Paul Kelly, DeForest Kelley, Ann Doran, Kay Scott | Maxwell Shane | Maxwell Shane | Based on story by Cornel Woollrich |
| Jun 20, 1947 | Danger Street | Jane Withers, Robert Lowery, Bill Edwards | Maxwell Shane, Kae Salkow, Winston Miller | Lew Landers | Story by Salkow & Miller |
| Aug 13, 1947 | Adventure Island | Rory Calhoun, Rhonda Fleming, Paul Kelly, John Abbott, Alan Napire | Maxwell Shane | Sam Newfield | based on The Ebb Tide by Robert Louis Stevenson |
| Aug 22, 1947 | Jungle Flight | Robert Lowery, Ann Savage, Barton MacLane | Whitman Chambers | Sam Newfield | Story by David Lang |
| Dec 12, 1947 | Big Town After Dark | Phil Reed, Hillary Brooke, Richard Travis | Whitman Chambers | William Thomas | Third in Big Town series |
| Feb 20, 1948 | Albuquerque | Randolph Scott, Barbara Britton, Russell Hayden, Gabby Hayes, Lon Chaney Jr | Gene Lewis, Clarence Upson Young | Ray Enright | Based on Dead Freight for Piute by Luke Short. Pine Thomas' most expensive film til that date. Clarion Production. |
| Mar 5, 1948 | Caged Fury | Richard Denning, Sheila Ryan, Buster Crabbe, Mary Beth Hughes | David Lang | William Berke | |
| Mar 26, 1948 | Mr. Reckless | William Eythe, Barbara Britton, Walter Catlett | Maxwell Shane, Milton Raison | Frank McDonald | Story by Thomas Ahearn |
| May 14, 1948 | Speed to Spare | Richard Arlen, Jean Rogers, Richard Travis | Milton Raison | William Berke | |
| May 27, 1948 | Big Town Scandal | Phillip Reed, Hillary Brooke, Stanley Clements | Milton Raison | William Thomas | 4th and last in the Big Town series |
| Jun 11, 1948 | Shaggy | Brenda Joyce, Georgie Nokes, Robert Shayne, Ralph Sanford | Maxwell Shane | Robert Tansey | |
| Jun 25, 1948 | Waterfront at Midnight | William Gargan, Mary Beth Hughes, Richard Travis | Bernard Girard | William Berke | |
| Dec 3, 1948 | Disaster | Richard Denning, Trudy Marshal, Damian O'Flynn | Thomas Ahearn | William Pine | |
| Jan 18, 1948 | Dynamite | William Gargan, Virginia Wells, Richard Crane | Milton Raison | William Pine | |
| Jul 21, 1949 | Manhandled | Dorothy Lamour, Sterling Hayden, Dan Duryea | Whitman Chambers, Lewis Foster | Lewis Foster | Based on the novel The Man Who Stole A Dream by L. S. Goldsmith |
| Jul 22, 1949 | Special Agent | William Eythe, Kasey Rogers, George Reeves | Whitman Chambers, Lewis Foster | William Thomas | Story by Milton Raison |
| Aug 5, 1949 | El Paso | John Payne, Sterling Hayden, Gail Russell, Gabby Hayes, Dick Foran, Eduardo Noriega | Lewis Foster | Lewis Foster | story by J. Robert Bren & Gladys Atwater. PT's first million dollar film |
| Feb 2, 1950 | Captain China | John Payne, Gail Russell, Jeffrey Lynn, Lon Chaney Jr | Lewis Foster, Gwen Bagni | Lewis Foster | Story by John Bagni & Gwen Bagni |
| May 30, 1950 | The Eagle and the Hawk | John Payne, Rhonda Fleming, Dennis O'Keefe | Lewis Foster, Daniel Manwaring | Lewis Foster | Story by Jess Arnold |
| Jun 1, 1950 | The Lawless | MacDonald Carey, Gail Russell, Johnny Sands | Daniel Mainwaring | Joseph Losey | Based on novel by Mainwaring |
| Nov 9, 1950 | Tripoli (1950) | John Payne, Maureen O'Hara, Howard da Silva, Phillip Reed | Winston Miller | Will Price | Based on story by Price and Miller |
| Apr 4, 1951 | The Last Outpost | Ronald Reagan, Bruce Bennett Rhonda Fleming | Winston Miller, Daniel Maninwaring, George Worthing Yates | Lewis Foster | Story by David Lang |
| Aug 30, 1951 | Passage West | John Payne, Dennis O'Keefe, Arleen Whelan | Lewis Foster, Alvah Bessie | Lewis Foster | Alvah Bessie worked uncredited |
| Dec 6, 1951 | Crosswinds | John Payne, Rhonda Fleming, Forrest Tucker, Robert Lowery | Lewis Foster | Lewis Foster | |
| Jan 12, 1952 | Hong Kong | Ronald Reagan, Rhonda Fleming, Nigel Bruce | Winston Miller | Lewis Foster | Story by Foster |
| Sep 1952 | Caribbean | John Payne, Arlene Dahl, Cedric Harwicke | Frank Moss, Edward Ludwig | Edward Ludwig | Story by Ellery Clark |
| Dec 1952 | The Blazing Forest | John Payne, William Demarest, Agnes Mooreheard, Richard Arlen | Lewis Foster, Winston Miller | Edward Ludwig | |
| Jan 14, 1953 | Tropic Zone | Ronald Reagan, Rhonda Fleming, Esletia | Lewis Foster | Lewis Foster | |
| Apr 22, 1953 | Jamaica Run | Ray Milland, Wendell Corey, Arlene Dahl | Lewis Foster | Lewis Foster | The Neat Little Corpse by Max Murray |
| May 27, 1953 | Sangaree | Fernando Lamas, Arlene Dahl, Patricia Medina | David Duncan, Frank Moss | Edward Ludwig | In 3D |
| Jun 3, 1953 | The Vanquished | John Payne, Jan Sterling, Colleen Gray, Lyle Bettger | Lewis Foster, Winston Miller, Frank Moss | Edward Ludwig | Story by Karl Brown |
| Sep 23, 1953 | Those Redheads From Seattle | Rhonda Fleming, Gene Barry, Agnes Moorehead | Lewis Foster, Daniel Mainwaring, George Yates | Lewis Foster | Musical |
| Feb 12, 1954 | Jivaro | Fernando Lamas, Rhonda Fleming, Brian Keith | Winston Miller | Edward Ludwig | Story by David Duncan, shot in 3D, aka Lost Treasure of the Amazon |
| Apr 20, 1955 | Run for Cover | James Cagney, John Derek, Viveca Lindfors, Ernest Borgnine | Winston Miller | Nicholas Ray | Story by Harriet Frank, Jr., Irving Ravetch |
| May 6, 1955 | Hell's Island | John Payne, Mary Murphy, Eduardo Noriega | Maxwell Shane | Phil Karlson | story by Martin Goldsmith, Jack Leonard |
| Aug 1955 | The Far Horizons | Fred MacMurray, Charlton Heston, Donna Reed, Barbara Hale | Winston Miller | Rudolph Maté | novel by Della Gould Emmons |
| Oct 20, 1955 | Lucy Gallant | Jane Wyman, Charlton Heston, Claire Trevor, William Demarest | John Lee Mahin, Winston Miller | Robert Parrish | Based on novella, "The Life of Lucy Gallant," by Margaret Cousins. Last film for Paramount |

=== United Artists Features ===
| Release date | Title | Stars | Writer | Director | Notes |
|---|---|---|---|---|---|
| May 11, 1956 | Nightmare | Edward G Robinson, Kevin McCarthy, Connie Russell | Maxwell Shane | Maxwell Shane | Based on story by Cornell Woolrich. Remake of Fear in the Night. Pine-Thomas-Shane Production |
| Mar 28, 1957 | The Big Caper | Rory Calhoun | Martin Berkeley, Mary Costa, James Gregory | Robert Stevens | Based on novel by Lionel White |
| May 1, 1957 | Bailout at 43,000 | John Payne, Karen Steele, Paul Kelly | Paul Monash | Francis D Lyon | Last film from the company. Based on a TV play. |

=== Produced by William Thomas alone ===
| Release date | Title | Stars | Writer | Director | Notes |
|---|---|---|---|---|---|
| 1976 | Cat Murkil and the Silks | | | | |
| 1977 | High Seas Hijack | | | | |

=== Shorts ===
| Release date | Title | Stars | Writer | Director | Notes |
|---|---|---|---|---|---|
| 1943 | A Letter from Bataan | Richard Arlen and Susan Hayward | | Pine | |
| 1942 | We Refuse to Die | | | Pine | |
| 1942 | The Price of Victory | Henry Wallace | | Pine | |
