= Big Town After Dark =

1947 film by William C. Thomas

- Theatrical release poster
- Directed by: William C. Thomas
- Screenplay by: Whitman Chambers
- Produced by: William H. Pine; William C. Thomas
- Starring: Phillip Reed; Hillary Brooke; Richard Travis; Ann Gillis; Vince Barnett; Joe Sawyer; Robert Kent
- Cinematography: Ellis W. Carter
- Edited by: Howard A. Smith
- Music by: Darrell Calker
- Production company: Pine-Thomas Productions
- Distributed by: Paramount Pictures
- Release date: December 12, 1947
- Running time: 69 minutes
- Country: United States
- Language: English

Big Town After Dark is a 1947 American crime drama film directed by William C. Thomas and written by Whitman Chambers. The film stars Phillip Reed, Hillary Brooke, Richard Travis, Ann Gillis, Vince Barnett, Joe Sawyer and Robert Kent. It was released on December 12, 1947, by Paramount Pictures.The film was the third in a series of four films based on the long-running radio program Big Town.

== Cast ==
- Phillip Reed as Steve Wilson
- Hillary Brooke as Lorelei Kilbourne
- Richard Travis as Chuck LaRue
- Ann Gillis as Susan Peabody LaRue
- Vince Barnett as Louie Snead
- Joe Sawyer as Monk
- Robert Kent as Jake Sebastian
- Charles Arnt as Amos Peabody
- Joseph Allen as Wally Blake
- William Haade as Marcus

== See also ==
- Big Town radio series
