= Billy Nelson (actor) =

Film and television actor

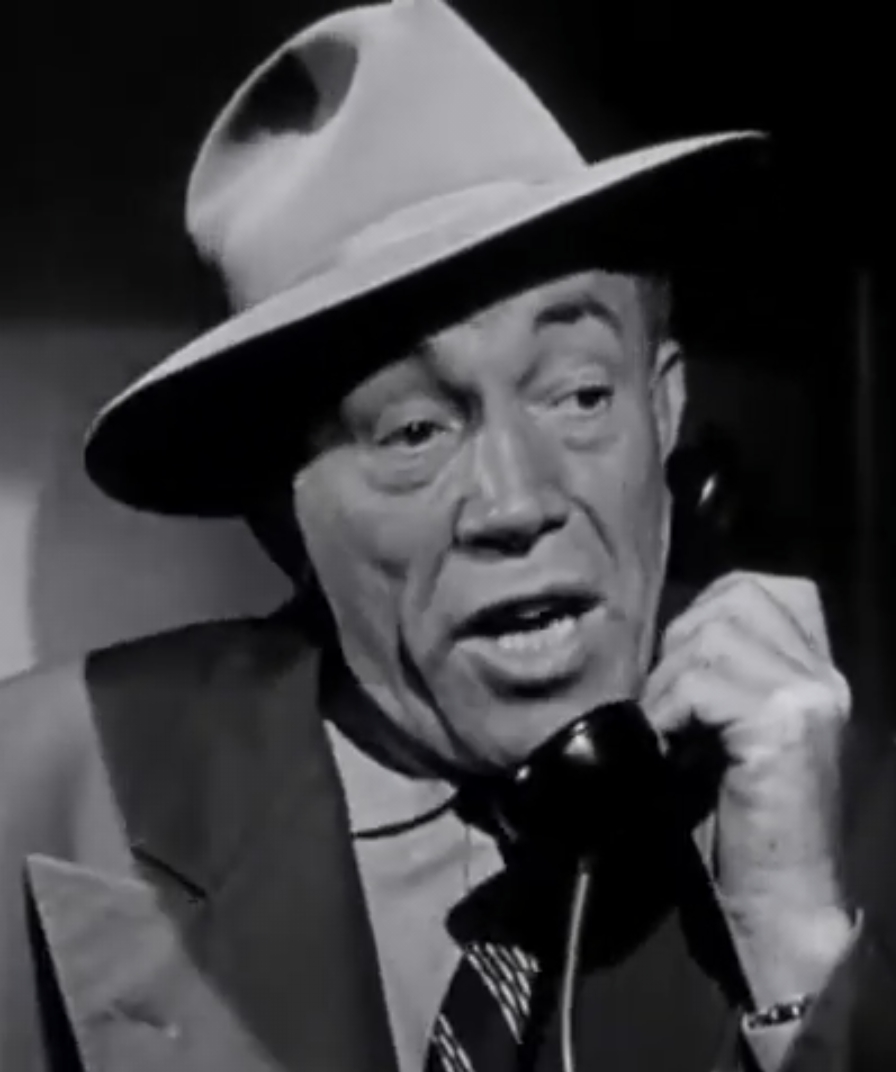
- Nelson in Stamp Day for Superman (1954)
- Born: William Nelson; July 19, 1903; Brooklyn, New York City, U.S.
- Died: June 13, 1979 (aged 75); Santa Monica, California, U.S.
- Occupations: Film and television actor
- Years active: 1935–1961
- Spouse: Irene Knight

Billy Nelson (born William Nelson; July 19, 1903 – June 13, 1979) was an American vaudeville comedian and actor who appeared in over 80 films and television programs. He was featured several times on one of the iconic black and white TV series of the 1950s Adventures of Superman; his appearances are still seen on television today.

He also played roles in the historic Hal Roach short comedy films as one of Hal Roach's All-Stars in the two-reel films often shown in theaters during the World War II era.

== Biography ==
Nelson was a nightclub master of ceremonies in the United States and abroad.

Nelson and his wife, violinist Irene Knight, developed a musical comedy act that was featured in several major markets during the 1930s.

The Nelson-Knight music and comedy duo often worked shows featuring vaudeville and Broadway ballerina Jeanne Devereaux.

Frequently cast as a villain, Nelson was a familiar face during the infancy of network and syndicated television. He played in roles on early television westerns and police procedurals, such as The Life and Legend of Wyatt Earp, Death Valley Days, Bat Masterson, Tombstone Territory, Highway Patrol, M Squad and Jack Webb's original Dragnet.

Nelson and his mother, Nettie Newman, were close with the actor Jack Haley.

Nelson made his first film appearances in 1933 in Hal Roach comedy short subjects. His (well-honed) blue-collar appearance made him a likely choice for roles as cab drivers, bartenders, and gunmen. For instance, in the five-year run of The Adventures Superman television series, Nelson played five different thugs. Nelson's last role was in the 1961 in Pocketful of Miracles.

== Filmography (selection) ==
- Look Up and Laugh (1935) (British)
- I Live on Danger (1942) as George 'Longshot' Harrison
- Wrecking Crew (1942) as Tom Kemp
- Minesweeper (1943) as Bos'un 'Freshwater' Heims
- Harvest Melody (1943) as Canvas Back Kirby
- Waterfront (1944) as Butch
- Gambler's Choice (1944) as Danny May
- High Powered (1945) as Bill Madden
- Senorita from the West (1945) as Taxicab Driver
- Search for Danger (1949) as Gunman in backseat of car
- Drums in the Deep South (1951) as Union Sergeant (uncredited)
- Stamp Day for Superman (1954, Short) as Blinky
- Alfred Hitchcock Presents (1956) (Season 2 Episode 2: "Fog Closing In") as Cab Driver
- 12 Angry Men (1957) as Court Clerk (uncredited)
- Pocketful of Miracles (1961) as Hood (uncredited)
