= Hot Cargo =

1946 film by Lew Landers

- Theatrical release poster
- Directed by: Lew Landers
- Screenplay by: Daniel Mainwaring
- Produced by: William H. Pine; William C. Thomas
- Starring: William Gargan; Jean Rogers; Phillip Reed; Larry Young; Harry Cording; Will Wright
- Cinematography: Fred Jackman Jr.
- Edited by: Henry Adams; Howard A. Smith
- Music by: Alexander Laszlo
- Production company: Pine-Thomas Productions
- Distributed by: Paramount Pictures
- Release date: June 28, 1946
- Running time: 57 minutes
- Country: United States
- Language: English

Hot Cargo is a 1946 American drama film directed by Lew Landers and written by Daniel Mainwaring. The film stars William Gargan, Jean Rogers, Phillip Reed, Larry Young, Harry Cording and Will Wright. The film was released on June 28, 1946, by Paramount Pictures.

== Plot ==
The first thing soldiers Joe and Chris do after coming home from the war is fulfill the quirky final wishes of a pal. Kissing a woman who owns a lumber mill is on the list, and after Chris plants one on an unsuspecting Jerry Walters, she slaps his face.

Going to visit their late friend's family, the Chapmans, they find its trucking business in total disarray. Chris is a botanist and Joe's career is baseball, but they put their own lives on hold to help the family. Although she had begun to take a shine to him, Jerry is offended when Chris asks her to let the Chapmans haul her lumber, believing she's been romanced with an ulterior motive.

Warren Porter is jealous of this interest in Jerry, and he and his boss, Matt Wayne, scheme against the newcomers and the family. Things get out of hand when one of the Chapmans is killed. Wayne ends up taking Jerry hostage and shooting Porter, after which the police, aided by Joe and Chris, arrive to save her.

== Cast ==
- William Gargan as Joe Harkness
- Jean Rogers as Jerry Walters
- Phillip Reed as Chris Bigelow
- Larry Young as Warren Porter
- Harry Cording as Matt Wayne
- Will Wright as Tim Chapman
- Virginia Brissac as Mrs. Chapman
- David Holt as Peter Chapman
- Elaine Riley as Porter's Secretary
- Dick Elliott as Frankie
