= The Eagle and the Hawk (1950 film) =

1950 film by Lewis R. Foster

- Theatrical release poster
- Directed by: Lewis R. Foster
- Screenplay by: Lewis R. Foster; Daniel Mainwaring
- Story by: Jess Arnold
- Produced by: William H. Pine; William C. Thomas
- Starring: John Payne; Rhonda Fleming; Dennis O'Keefe; Thomas Gomez; Fred Clark; Frank Faylen
- Cinematography: James Wong Howe
- Edited by: Howard A. Smith
- Music by: Rudy Schrager
- Color process: Technicolor
- Production company: Pine-Thomas Productions
- Distributed by: Paramount Pictures
- Release date: May 30, 1950
- Running time: 104 minutes
- Country: United States
- Language: English
- Box office: $1.5 million

The Eagle and the Hawk is a 1950 American Western film directed by Lewis R. Foster and written by Lewis R. Foster and Daniel Mainwaring. The film stars John Payne, Rhonda Fleming, Dennis O'Keefe, Thomas Gomez, Fred Clark and Frank Faylen. It was released on May 30, 1950, by Paramount Pictures.

== Plot ==
In 1863, governor of Texas Francis Lubbock asks Todd Croyden of the Texas Rangers to free a Union Army spy from a Confederate camp. Lubbock is helping France, which is trying to seize Mexico. Guns and ammunition are being stolen in Corales, so the governor wants Croyden and the spy, Whitney Randolph, to investigate. Croyden does not like Randolph, who wins his horse and harmonica by gambling while on the trail.

While crossing the Rio Grande, they are held at gunpoint by Madeline Danzeeger, whose wagon is stuck. After helping her, they learn that a former German army officer also named Danzeeger, likely her father, is working with Mexican general Liguras for a great deal of money. Croyden locates the missing munitions at Basil Danzeeger's ranch, but foreman Red Hyatt is suspicious of him. Croyden and Randolph set a fire to destroy the gunpowder, but Madeline, who is Basil's wife, takes them prisoner. Hyatt tries to kill Croyden by tying him to two wild horses, and Randolph dies while saving him.

Madeline has a change of heart, having fallen in love with Croyden, and is shot by her husband. Basil and Liguras fight to the death but Madeline will recover from her wound.

== Cast ==
- John Payne as Captain Todd Croyden
- Rhonda Fleming as Mrs. Madeline Danzeeger
- Dennis O'Keefe as Whitney Randolph
- Thomas Gomez as General Liguras (The Hawk)
- Fred Clark as Basil Danzeeger
- Frank Faylen as Red' Hyatt, Danzeeger's Foreman
- Eduardo Noriega as Roberto the Cobbler
- Grandon Rhodes as Texas Governor Francis Lubbock
- Walter Reed as Jones

== Production ==
Pine-Thomas Productions was so pleased with the film that it sought to reteam Payne, Fleming and O'Keefe in more films as a series.
