= Torpedo Boat (film) =

1942 film by John Rawlins

- Theatrical release poster
- Directed by: John Rawlins
- Screenplay by: Maxwell Shane
- Story by: Paul Franklin; Aaron Gottlieb
- Produced by: William H. Pine; William C. Thomas
- Starring: Richard Arlen; Jean Parker; Mary Carlisle; Phillip Terry; Dick Purcell; Ralph Sanford
- Cinematography: Fred Jackman Jr.
- Edited by: William H. Ziegler
- Production company: Pine-Thomas Productions
- Distributed by: Paramount Pictures
- Release date: January 24, 1942
- Running time: 70 minutes
- Country: United States
- Language: English

Torpedo Boat is a 1942 American drama film from Pine-Thomas Productions directed by John Rawlins, written by Maxwell Shane, and starring Richard Arlen, Jean Parker, Mary Carlisle, Phillip Terry, Dick Purcell and Ralph Sanford. It was released on January 24, 1942, by Paramount Pictures.

== Cast ==
- Richard Arlen as Skinner Barnes
- Jean Parker as Grace Holman
- Mary Carlisle as Jane Townsend
- Phillip Terry as Tommy Whelan
- Dick Purcell as Ralph Andrews
- Ralph Sanford as Hector Bobry
- Oscar O'Shea as Captain Mike
- Robert Middlemass as Mr. Townsend
- Warren Hymer as Marine
- William Haade as Big Sweeney, Riveter
- Virginia Sale as Mrs. Sweeney

== Production ==
The film was based on an original story by Alex Gottlieb. Pine-Thomas Productions bought it in May 1941 and assigned Richard Arlen to star.

Filming started October 1941. Arlen had made three films for Pine-Thomas, who then signed a new three-film contract with the actor; this was the first movie under that contract and the first to not deal with an aviation theme.

Frances Farmer was supposed to play the female lead but she was then put in Son of Fury (1942). She was replaced by Jean Parker who had made a number of films for Pine-Thomas.

The film was shot before America's entry into World War II, but released afterwards. In January 1942 the Los Angeles Times wrote it was "one of those modest Pine Thomas affairs which might have slipped by without a ripple a month ago but which today sound like prophecy."

In particular the film attracted attention for a scene where an old ship was converted into a fighter with planes on top and torpedo boats below; the planes would scout for the enemy and then the boats would attack. Screenwriters Maxwell Shane and Richard Murphy made up this concept but then Chairman Carl Vinson of the House Naval Affairs Committee proposed a similar idea. Pine-Thomas sent a copy of the film to the committee and arranged for the film to be released earlier.
