= They Made Me a Killer =

1946 film by Pine-Thomas Productions

- Theatrical release poster
- Directed by: William C. Thomas
- Screenplay by: Daniel Mainwaring (as Geoffrey Homes); Winston Miller; Kae Salkow
- Based on: Owen Franes
- Produced by: William H. Pine; William C. Thomas
- Starring: Robert Lowery; Barbara Britton
- Cinematography: Fred Jackman Jr.
- Edited by: Henry Adams
- Music by: Alexander Laszlo
- Color process: Black and white
- Production company: Pine-Thomas Productions
- Distributed by: Paramount Pictures
- Release date: May 3, 1946 (U.S.)
- Running time: 64 minutes
- Country: United States
- Language: English

They Made Me a Killer is a 1946 American film noir crime film directed by William C. Thomas, and written by Daniel Mainwaring, Winston Miller and Kae Salkow, based on a story by Owen Franes. It stars Barbara Britton and Robert Lowery, and marks the final screen appearance of Lola Lane. It was made by Pine-Thomas, the B-movie unit of Paramount Pictures.

== Plot ==
After his brother is killed in an accident, Tom Durling quits his job and drives across country. He gives an attractive girl a ride and is subsequently forced at gun point to be the driver in a bank robbery. During the crime another innocent man, Steve Reynolds, becomes involved and is killed in the escape. After a high-speed chase, the car crashes and Durling is knocked unconscious. The robbers get away and the police arrest Durling, refusing to believe that he isn't one of the criminals.

Durling escapes from the police at a hospital and teams up with Reynolds' sister in an attempt to prove his innocence. The trail leads to a small roadside diner where the two end up finding the gang hiding out in the building's basement. They go undercover, she as a waitress and Durling joining the gang, eventually tricking the criminals into confessing their crimes. Durling's reputation is saved and the gang, led by a Ma Barker-type mom, are caught.

== Cast ==
- Robert Lowery as Tom Durling
- Barbara Britton as June Reynolds
- Lola Lane as Betty Ford
- Frank Albertson as Al Wilson, Glen Grove patrolman
- Elisabeth Risdon as 'Ma' Conley (as Elizabeth Risdon)
- Byron Barr as Steve Reynolds
- Edmund MacDonald as Jack Conley aka Chance
- Ralph Sanford as Patrolman Roach
- James Bush as Frank Conley
- Paul Harvey as District Attorney Booth
- John Harmon as Joe Lafferty
