= Submarine Alert =

1943 film by Frank McDonald

- Theatrical poster
- Directed by: Frank McDonald
- Written by: Maxwell Shane
- Based on: an original story by Shane
- Produced by: William H. Pine; William C. Thomas
- Starring: Richard Arlen; Wendy Barrie; Nils Asther; Roger Pryor; Marc Lawrence; Ralph Sanford
- Cinematography: Fred Jackman Jr.
- Edited by: William H. Ziegler
- Music by: Freddie Rich
- Production company: Pine-Thomas Productions
- Distributed by: Paramount Pictures
- Release date: June 28, 1943
- Running time: 66 minutes
- Country: United States
- Language: English

Submarine Alert is a 1943 American war film directed by Frank McDonald, produced by Pine-Thomas Productions and released by Paramount Pictures. The film stars Richard Arlen, Wendy Barrie, Nils Asther, Roger Pryor, Marc Lawrence and Ralph Sanford.

== Plot ==
During World War II, with shipping being sunk by submarines and with an American scientist working on radio technology killed by Nazi spies, FBI agent G. B. Fleming (Roger Pryor) comes up with a plan to catch the Nazis. He believes that radio signals are alerting the Germans about ship movements. His plan is to fire all the local radio specialists, who likely will seek any employment, including working with the enemy. Tailing the jobless radio men will help the FBI find the Nazis.

Engineer Lewis J. "Lew" Deerhold (Richard Arlen) thinks he lost his job because he is a Canadian citizen. Lew looks after his niece Tina (Patsy Nash), a war orphan requiring a brain operation. Needing money, he applies for work at a radio repair shop, where he meets Ann Patterson (Wendy Barrie), the victim of a purse snatching. Lew recovers her purse and asks Ann out on a date.

After coming back to his apartment, his new boss is there with Dr. Arthur Huneker (Nils Asther) and his assistant Vincent Bela (Marc Lawrence). Lew is offered a job by Huneker, a Nazi spy commander who needs someone to repair a top-secret stolen radio transmitter. Ann is an FBI agent who has been assigned to follow Lew. She finds blueprints to the transmitter in Lew's possession. When FBI agent Freddie Grayson (Ralph Sanford) searches Lew's apartment, he is shot but is able to tell Lew that the doctor has the stolen transmitter and shot him.

Lew confronts Huneker, who is meeting with Japanese Commander Toyo (Abner Biberman). The pair try to convince Lew to join the Nazi party; he pretends to go along. When they begin to torture the owner of the Bambridge shipping company (John Miljan), their new recruit is ordered to kill Bambridge, who is actually Captain Hargas, an American agent. Instead, Lew escapes, taking with him the codes for the transmitter.

At the doctor's hot springs resort, Lew and Ann join forces, but are captured and locked in a steam room by Huneker. Before they are killed by the steam, Lew devises a transmitter and sends an SOS that is picked up by a young boy whose father calls the FBI. FBI agents rush to save Lew and Ann, and arrest Huneker and his men. Agent Fleming also contacts a bomber squadron that destroys the Japanese submarine laying in wait off the California coast. With his niece Tina recovered from her operation, and Ann in attendance, Lew, now a private in the US Army, is granted American citizenship.

== Cast ==
- Richard Arlen as Lewis J. "Lew" Deerhold
- Wendy Barrie as FBI Agent Ann Patterson
- Nils Asther as Dr. Arthur Huneker
- Roger Pryor as G.B. Fleming
- Abner Biberman as Commander Toyo
- Marc Lawrence as Vincent Bela
- John Miljan as Mr. Bambridge / Capt. Haigas
- Patsy Nash as Tina Deerhold
- Ralph Sanford as FBI Agent Freddie Grayson

== Production ==
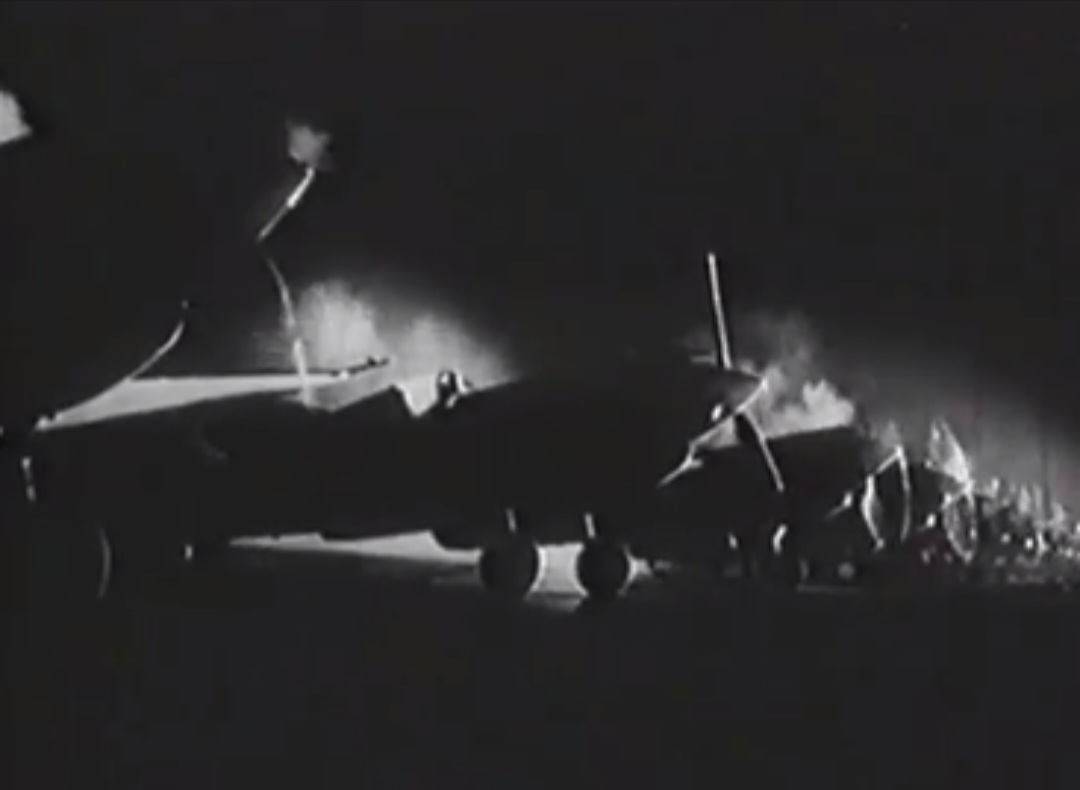
The use of stock footage resulted in the "3rd Bomber Squadron" being composed of Curtiss P-40 Warhawk fighters. (Note: The budget for Submarine Alert did not allow for more than a few studio back screen shots and the use of stock footage and miniatures. During the bombing of the submarine, at least three different aircraft types are inexplicably used during the attack.)

Principal photography for Submarine Alert took place from June 1 to mid-June 1942 at the Fine Arts Studios, Hollywood, California.

== Reception ==
Submarine Alert was another in the series of B films churned out by the Pine-Thomas team. The film villain again was Swedish-born Nils Asther who was featured in three war adventures put out by William H. Pine and William C. Thomas.

Like many of the spy and secret agent films of the era, it was a cautionary tale about the dangers of Nazi and Axis infiltration. As a mildly patriotic vehicle, the film also made a statement about American values. For reviewer Hal Erickson, "The plot of the Pine-Thomas adventure quickie 'Submarine Alert' is more than a little beholden to Hitchcock's 'The 39 Steps'."

The film was not released for a year after it was made. Variety thought this made the film out of date.
