= Passage West (film) =

1951 film by Lewis R. Foster

- Directed by: Lewis R. Foster
- Written by: Lewis R. Foster; Nedrick Young (as a front for "Hollywood Ten" author Alvah Bessie)
- Produced by: William H. Pine; William C. Thomas
- Starring: John Payne; Dennis O'Keefe; Arleen Whelan
- Cinematography: Loyal Griggs
- Edited by: Howard A. Smith
- Music by: Mahlon Merrick
- Color process: Technicolor
- Production company: Pine-Thomas Productions
- Distributed by: Paramount Pictures
- Release date: August 30, 1951 (New York)
- Running time: 80 minutes
- Country: United States
- Language: English
- Box office: $1,025,000 (U.S. rentals)

Passage West is a 1951 American Western film directed by Lewis R. Foster and starring John Payne, Dennis O'Keefe and Arleen Whelan.

== Plot ==
Six convicts, led by Pete Black, escape a Utah prison and intercept a California-bound wagon train and interrupt a child's funeral. Demanding that the wagons leave immediately, they anger Rose Billings, a woman in a black dress mourning her father, but wagon train leader Jacob Karns, a preacher who plans to marry Rose, thinks that it best to obey the men. Curly, one of the prisoners, makes a pass at Rose and is whipped by Pete. He fancies Rose for himself, but she whips him.

At a fork on the trail, Pete insists that the wagons risk a faster but more dangerous route. They are soon trapped in dust and rain storms. A cow dies, and without milk, a baby dies. When Rose changes her mourning clothes for a frilly outfit, Pete again shows an interest in her, and Karns fights and defeats him.

Curly steals money from the travelers and shoots Pete, who is surprised when Karns and Rose willingly tend to his wound. Karns admits that he once led a wild life as Pete now does, and he appeals to Pete to change.

Reaching a town, the fugitives discover gold in a cave and their greed consumes them. Gunfire ensues, and Pete, guilty and tired, detonates a charge of dynamite to bury all of his men as well as himself.

== Cast ==
- John Payne as Pete Black
- Arleen Whelan as Rose Billings
- Dennis O'Keefe as Jacob Karns
- Frank Faylen as Curly
- Mary Anderson as Myra Johnson
- Peter Hansen as Michael Karns
- Richard Rober as Mike
- Mary Beth Hughes as Nellie McBride
- Griff Barnett as Papa Emil Ludwig
- Mary Field as Miss Swingate
- Dooley Wilson as Rainbow
- Richard Travis as Ben Johnson
- Lillian Bronson as Bom Brennan
- Arthur Hunnicutt as Pop Brennan
- Ilka Grüning as Mama Ludwig (as Ilka Gruning)

== Reception ==
In a contemporary review for The New York Times, critic Oscar Godbout wrote: "The trials and tribulations of a wagon train of religious settlers after they have been taken over by a half dozen jail-breaking gunmen seems to have fired the enthusiasm of producers William Pine and William Thomas. They managed to come out pretty well on the credit side of the ledger ... 'Passage West,' while interesting, is not one for the books."
