= Crosswinds (film) =

1951 adventure film by Lewis R. Foster

- Directed by: Lewis R. Foster
- Written by: Lewis R. Foster
- Produced by: William H. Pine; William C. Thomas
- Starring: John Payne; Rhonda Fleming; Forrest Tucker
- Cinematography: Loyal Griggs
- Edited by: Howard Smith
- Music by: Lucien Cailliet
- Production company: Pine-Thomas Productions
- Distributed by: Paramount Pictures
- Release date: December 6, 1951
- Running time: 95 minutes
- Country: United States
- Language: English
- Box office: $1,250,000

Crosswinds is a 1951 American Technicolor adventure film directed by Lewis R. Foster and starring Rhonda Fleming, John Payne and Forrest Tucker. It was produced by Pine-Thomas Productions for distribution by Paramount Pictures. The film was rereleased in 1962 by Citation Films as Jungle Attack in a double bill with Untamed West.

== Plot ==
In New Guinea, "Jumbo" Johnson and seaplane pilot Nick Brandon are discussing a possible gold heist and have a drink with attractive widow Katherine Shelley.

A magnificent schooner called The Seeker docks in port, captained by Steve Singleton. As he proposes a pearl-diving expedition to Jumbo, Steve sees Brandon and, without explanation, punches him.

Katherine wants to join the men, but Steve sets sail without her as soon as Jumbo arranges the necessary documents in town. Two weeks later, still without any pearls, Steve's ship is boarded by Australian naval authorities, who examine his papers and declare them to be forgeries. Steve is arrested and the boat is impounded. While in jail, he learns that Jumbo has bought the boat at auction.

Another vessel, The Susan, arrives with two Englishmen on board, Cecil Daubrey and "Mousey" Sykes. In need of a captain because theirs died mysteriously at sea, they watch Steve fix their engine and offer him a job as skipper.

Katherine and Brandon have disappeared after departing on his plane. Cecil and Mousey believe that at least $10 million in gold was aboard Brandon's craft and intend to search for the plane, which is presumed to have crashed. They leave port with Steve at the helm and find Brandon's dead body near an island, where Katherine has been captured by native headhunters.

Jumbo joins forces with Steve, who explains that Brandon betrayed him during the war. They find the plane, only to be double-crossed by the Englishmen, who drop a net over them. Steve frees them and saves Jumbo's life. Cecil is killed by headhunters' spears and Mousey is thrown to the crocodiles. Steve returns to port safely, and he and Katherine sail away together.

== Cast ==
- John Payne as Steve Singleton
- Rhonda Fleming as Katherine Shelley
- Forrest Tucker as Jumbo Johnson
- Robert Lowery as Nick Brandon
- Alan Mowbray as Sir Cecil Daubrey
- John Abbott as Algernon "Mousey" Sykes
