= Lucy Gallant =

1955 film

- Theatrical release poster
- Directed by: Robert Parrish
- Screenplay by: John Lee Mahin; Winston Miller
- Based on: novella, "The Life of Lucy Gallant," by Margaret Cousins
- Produced by: William H. Pine; William C. Thomas
- Starring: Jane Wyman; Charlton Heston; Claire Trevor; Thelma Ritter; William Demarest; Wallace Ford
- Cinematography: Lionel Lindon
- Edited by: Howard A. Smith
- Music by: Nathan Van Cleave
- Production company: Pine-Thomas Productions
- Distributed by: Paramount Pictures
- Release date: October 20, 1955
- Running time: 104 minutes
- Country: United States
- Language: English
- Box office: $1,300,000 (US)

Lucy Gallant is a 1955 American drama film directed by Robert Parrish and written by John Lee Mahin and Winston Miller. The film stars Jane Wyman, Charlton Heston, Claire Trevor, Thelma Ritter, William Demarest and Wallace Ford. The film was released on October 20, 1955, by Paramount Pictures.

The story is based on a novella, "The Life of Lucy Gallant," by Texas-born author Margaret Cousins (1905–1996), published in Good Housekeeping magazine in May 1953.

It was the last film Pine-Thomas Productions made at Paramount, an association that had endured since 1940.

== Plot ==
While traveling from New York City to Mexico, the stylish Lucy Gallant is stranded by a storm in fictitious big oil boom town New City, Texas, where rancher Casey Cole helps find her suitable lodging. The public reaction to her fashions persuades Lucy to sell the contents of her trousseau, and she decides to stay and open a dress shop.

Lucy lives at Molly Basserman's boarding house and runs her store out of Lady "Mac" MacBeth's brothel, called the Red Derrick. She obtains a loan from banker Charlie Madden. She is courted by Casey, who learns that Lucy was jilted at the altar when her fiancé found out about her father's dishonest business practices.

Casey insists that she give up her business. They quarrel, and after joining the United States Army during World War II, he becomes engaged to a fashion model in Paris. But Casey soon returns to Texas to save Lucy from banker Madden's underhanded business dealings. He also salvages their romance.

== Cast ==
- Jane Wyman as Lucy Gallant
- Charlton Heston as Casey Cole
- Claire Trevor as Lady "Mac" MacBeth
- Thelma Ritter as Molly Basserman
- William Demarest as Charlie Madden
- Wallace Ford as Gus Basserman
- Tom Helmore as Jim Wardman
- Gloria Talbott as Laura Wilson
- James Westerfield as Harry Wilson
- Mary Field as Irma Wilson
- Joel Fluellen as Summertime
- Texas Governor Allan Shivers as himself
- Edith Head as herself

== Production ==
The film was based on a novella, "The Longest Day of the Year" (which was later turned into the novel "The Life of Lucy Gallant"). Paramount bought the screen rights and hired John Lee Mahin to adapt it. The story was set in Oklahoma but the film is set in Texas.

The producers wanted Joan Crawford for the lead. Eventually the role went to Jane Wyman, who was borrowed from Warner Bros. Charlton Heston, who had just made The Far Horizons for Pine-Thomas, signed to play her co star. John Lee Mahin wrote the script and Robert Parrish agreed to direct. Thelma Ritter and Claire Trevor were cast in the two main support roles.

Filming started August 18, 1954. Texas Governor Allan Shivers plays himself. So too does costumer Edith Head.

Edith Head's designs were later sold commercially.

Jody McCrea made his film debut in the picture.

== See also ==
- List of American films of 1955
