= Waterfront at Midnight =

1948 film by William A. Berke

- Theatrical release poster
- Directed by: William Berke
- Screenplay by: Bernard Girard
- Produced by: William H. Pine; William C. Thomas
- Starring: William Gargan; Mary Beth Hughes; Richard Travis; Richard Crane; Cheryl Walker; Horace McMahon
- Cinematography: Ellis W. Carter
- Edited by: Howard A. Smith
- Music by: Harry Lubin
- Production company: Pine-Thomas Productions
- Distributed by: Paramount Pictures
- Release date: June 25, 1948
- Running time: 63 minutes
- Country: United States
- Language: English

Waterfront at Midnight is a 1948 American film noir crime film directed by William Berke, written by Bernard Girard and starring William Gargan, Mary Beth Hughes, Richard Travis, Richard Crane, Cheryl Walker and Horace McMahon. It was released on June 25, 1948, by Paramount Pictures.

== Plot ==
A detective mistakenly shoots his own brother who has become a criminal involved with a dangerous boss.

== Cast ==
- William Gargan as Mike Hanrohan
- Mary Beth Hughes as Ethel Novack
- Richard Travis as 'Socks' Barstow
- Richard Crane as Denny Hanrohan
- Cheryl Walker as Helen Hanrohan
- Horace McMahon as Hank Bremmer
- John Hart as Woody
- Douglas Fowley as Joe Sargus
- Paul Harvey as Commissioner Ryan
- Keye Luke as Loy
