= Caged Fury (1948 film) =

1948 film by William A. Berke

- Theatrical release poster
- Directed by: William Berke
- Screenplay by: David Lang
- Produced by: William H. Pine; William C. Thomas
- Starring: Richard Denning; Sheila Ryan; Mary Beth Hughes; Buster Crabbe; Frank Wilcox
- Cinematography: Ellis W. Carter
- Edited by: Howard A. Smith
- Music by: Harry Lubin
- Production company: Pine-Thomas Productions
- Distributed by: Paramount Pictures
- Release date: March 5, 1948
- Running time: 60 minutes
- Country: United States
- Language: English

Caged Fury is a 1948 American drama film directed by William Berke and written by David Lang. The film stars Richard Denning, Sheila Ryan, Mary Beth Hughes, Buster Crabbe and Frank Wilcox. The film was released on March 5, 1948, by Paramount Pictures.

== Plot ==
Dan Corey's circus employs a pair of lion tamers, Blaney and Smiley, whose act also includes Smiley's sweetheart Lola Tremaine and a ferocious lion known as Sultan.

Lola is jealous of another circus performer, Kit Warren, a horseback rider Blaney has been seeing. A scheme by Smiley results in Lola's being trapped inside the cage and mauled to death by the lion.

Kit wants to replace Lola in the act. She begins to learn the lion-taming act but breaks up with Blaney in the process. Smiley is attracted to her and decides to do away with Blaney once and for all. He begins to abuse Sultan, dressing like Blaney in the hope of turning the lion against the other man. After he is caught red-handed by circus owner Corey in his sinister plot, Smiley kills Corey, but while speeding away, Smiley's car goes over a cliff.

A year later, Blaney and Kit are doing the lion-taming act when Smiley suddenly reappears. He had leapt from the car just in time. Now he's come back to murder Blaney, but during their violent fight, Smiley is fatally attacked by the lion.

== Cast ==
- Richard Denning as Blaney Lewis
- Sheila Ryan as Kit Warren
- Mary Beth Hughes as Lola Tremaine
- Buster Crabbe as Smiley
- Frank Wilcox as Dan Corey
