= Bailout at 43,000 =

1957 film

- Theatrical film poster
- Directed by: Francis D. Lyon
- Screenplay by: Paul Monash
- Produced by: Howard Pine; William C. Thomas
- Starring: John Payne; Karen Steele; Paul Kelly; Richard Eyer; Constance Ford; Eddie Firestone
- Cinematography: Lionel Lindon
- Edited by: George A. Gittens
- Music by: Albert Glasser
- Production company: Pine-Thomas-Shane Productions
- Distributed by: United Artists
- Release date: May 1, 1957
- Running time: 78 minutes
- Country: United States
- Language: English

Bailout at 43,000 is a 1957 American drama film directed by Francis D. Lyon and written by Paul Monash. The film stars John Payne, Karen Steele, Paul Kelly, Richard Eyer, Constance Ford and Eddie Firestone. The film was released on May 1, 1957, by United Artists.

It was the last film from Pine-Thomas Productions then known as Pine-Thomas-Shane.

== Plot ==
United States Air Force Colonel William Hughes (Paul Kelly) asks Major Paul Peterson (John Payne), who has been called back to active service, to join a team at the Air Research and Development Command conducting tests on a downward ejection seat for bombardiers in the new Boeing B-47 Stratojet bomber. The first tests used articulated dummies, but human test subjects are needed. Besides Colonel Hughes, German scientist Dr. Franz Gruener (Gregory Gaye), also is in charge of the test program, working directly with the test subjects. Captain Jack Nolan (Richard Crane) is also assigned to the project.

The first volunteer, Captain Mike Cavallero (Eddie Firestone), suffers a broken neck when his parachute opens too early. He survives the test but is hospitalized. The next subject is Lieutenant Edward Simmons, to be followed by Paul. When Mike is suddenly rushed to hospital with an appendicitis attack, Paul moves up. Worried because he has a wife and son, Paul is reluctant to go, but then finds out that Captain Nolan has been killed in a B-47 crash, and as the bombardier, he might not have been able to escape the aircraft.

His wife (Karen Steele) begs his commanding officer to release Paul from his commitment. When Paul shows up to take the test, he finds Colonel Hughes suiting up. Imploring him to reconsider, Paul makes the case for doing the test to prove that a bailout is possible from the high-speed jet bomber. Flying with Dr. Gruener, Paul ejects, but when the ground observers ask him to indicate he is well by spread-eagling, he does not respond. On board the rescue launch, they pick up Paul and find he is fine; he was simply concentrating so hard that he forgot to spread-eagle. After he is cleared by the medics, Paul is greeted by Carol and his son Kit (Richard Eyer) and, with their blessing, decides to continue with the project.

== Cast ==
- John Payne as Major Paul Peterson
- Karen Steele as Carol Peterson
- Paul Kelly as Colonel Hughes
- Richard Eyer as Kit Peterson
- Constance Ford as Mrs. Frances Nolan
- Eddie Firestone as Captain Mike Cavallero
- Adam Kennedy as Lieutenant Ed Simmons
- Gregory Gaye as Dr. Franz Gruener
- Steven Ritch as Major Irv Goldman
- Richard Crane as Captain Jack Nolan

== Original TV Play ==
Bailout at 43,000 Feet was an episode of the Climax! dramatic anthology television series. The episode played on season 2 as episode 15, airing on December 29, 1955, directed by John Frankenheimer, produced by Martin Manulis, hosted by William Lundigan and starring Charlton Heston, Richard Boone and Bart Burns. (Note: Nancy Reagan appeared in one of the supporting roles.)

=== Cast ===
- Charlton Heston as Lt. Paul Peterson
- Nancy Reagan as Carol Peterson
- Richard Boone ss Col. Hughes
- Lee Marvin as Capt. Cavallero
- Bart Burns
- Charles Davis
- Gil Frye
- John Gallaudet
- Harvey Grant
- William Hughes

== Production ==
Carl Dudley originally expressed interest in buying the screen rights to the TV play. Eventually Bill Thomas of Pine-Thomas-Shane Productions got them.

In adapting the episode for the screen, Bailout at 43,000 was slightly revised, with tension heightened in the interaction between a former Nazi scientist and pilots engaged in the bailout tests.

In August 1956 it was announced Boone would reprise his TV role. However in October he was replaced by Paul Kelly.

Star John Payne was winding up his film career with Bailout at 43,000, while Paul Kelly made his last film appearance, ending a long career that began in 1911 as a child actor in silent films. Karen Steele was borrowed from Sam Goldwyn Jr.

The film was made with the full cooperation of the United States Air Force and featured a number of airfield and aerial sequences with Boeing B-47 Stratojet bombers. (Note: The aircraft used in the film was B-47B-25-BW, serial number 51-2057, that was converted to the YRB-47B standard, and redesignated a TB-47B, flying with the 340th Bombardment Wing at Whiteman Air Force Base, Missouri in 1955–1962.)

Filming started 1 October 1956.

== Reception ==
Bailout at 43,000 was burdened by both its television episode origin and a B-movie budget, making it little more than what film critic Leonard Maltin called, "Routine material" "... not enhanced by flight sequences or romantic relief."

The New York Times called it a "tedious film".

It was the last film from Pine-Thomas Productions.
