= Hong Kong (film) =

1952 film by Lewis R. Foster

- Theatrical release poster
- Directed by: Lewis R. Foster
- Screenplay by: Winston Miller
- Story by: Lewis R. Foster
- Produced by: William H. Pine; William C. Thomas
- Starring: Ronald Reagan; Rhonda Fleming; Nigel Bruce; Marvin Miller; Mary Somerville; Lowell Gilmore
- Cinematography: Lionel Lindon
- Edited by: Howard A. Smith
- Music by: Lucien Cailliet
- Production company: Pine-Thomas Productions
- Distributed by: Paramount Pictures
- Release date: December 19, 1951
- Running time: 94 minutes
- Country: United States
- Language: English
- Box office: $1,250,000 (U.S. rentals)

Hong Kong is a 1952 American adventure film directed by Lewis R. Foster, written by Winston Miller and starring Ronald Reagan, Rhonda Fleming, Nigel Bruce, Marvin Miller, Mary Somerville and Lowell Gilmore. The film was released in December 1951 by Paramount Pictures and was rereleased in 1961 under the title Bombs Over China.

== Plot ==
Jeff Williams is an American army veteran living in China who must flee the Red Army as the country falls to communism. Along the way, he encounters a Chinese orphan named Wei Lin who is carrying an ancient and valuable golden idol. Williams must outwit both the communists and Chinese gangsters while scheming to profit from the idol himself.

== Cast ==
- Ronald Reagan as Jeff Williams
- Rhonda Fleming as Victoria Evans
- Nigel Bruce as Mr. Lighton
- Marvin Miller as Tao Liang
- Lady May Lawford as Mrs. Lighton
- Lowell Gilmore as Danton
- Claud Allister as Hotel Manager
- Danny Chang as Wei Lin

== Reception ==
In a contemporary review for The New York Times, critic Howard Thompson wrote: "The miracle of 'Hong Kong' ... is that the picture manages to keep going at all. William Pine and William Thomas, those diehard promoters of Paramount's adventure quickies in Technicolor, have served up another corn meal special, with chop suey added, not to say Ronald Reagan and Rhonda Fleming, and in about that order."

== Adaptations ==
- Eastern Color Movie Love #13 (February 1952)
