= Big Town Scandal =

1948 film by William C. Thomas

- Theatrical release poster
- Directed by: William C. Thomas
- Screenplay by: Milton Raison
- Produced by: William H. Pine; William C. Thomas
- Starring: Phillip Reed; Hillary Brooke; Stanley Clements; Darryl Hickman; Carl Switzer; Roland Dupree
- Cinematography: Ellis W. Carter
- Edited by: Howard A. Smith
- Music by: Darrell Calker
- Production company: Pine-Thomas Productions
- Distributed by: Paramount Pictures
- Release date: May 27, 1948
- Running time: 60 minutes
- Country: United States
- Language: English

Big Town Scandal is a 1948 American crime film directed by William C. Thomas and written by Milton Raison. The film stars Phillip Reed, Hillary Brooke, Stanley Clements, Darryl Hickman, Carl Switzer and Roland Dupree. It was released on May 27, 1948, by Paramount Pictures. The film was the fourth and last one in a series of four films based on the long-running radio program Big Town.

== Plot ==
After juvenile boys get caught robbing a sporting goods store, reporter Lorelei Kilbourne pleads for leniency in court and her boss and boyfriend, editor Steve Wilson, ends up reluctantly vouching for the boys. He converts an old newspaper building into a recreation center, where he coaches the boys in basketball. Tommy Malone goes for a joy ride in the car of a gangster, Joe Moreley. A business arrangement is struck, where Moreley will stash stolen goods at the rec center while betting on the team's basketball games, which Tommy will deliberately lose.

The other boys try to return some stolen furs, but one of them, Pinky Jones, ends up shot. Tommy tries to end his deal with Moreley, only to be threatened by Cato, the gangster's gunman. Tommy double-crosses the crooks, winning the next game. Cato shoots him. Tommy's friend and teammate "Dum Dum" pursues Moreley in the bleachers, where Moreley falls off. Tommy recovers in the hospital, while Steve and Lorelei end up getting custody of three more delinquent boys.

== Cast ==
- Phillip Reed as Steve Wilson
- Hillary Brooke as Lorelei Kilbourne
- Stanley Clements as Tommy Malone
- Darryl Hickman as Harold 'Skinny' Peters
- Carl Switzer as Frankie Snead
- Roland Dupree as John 'Pinky' Jones
- Tommy Bond as Waldo 'Dum Dum' Riggs
- Vince Barnett as Louie Snead
- Charles Arnt as Amos Peabody
- Joseph Allen as Wally Blake
- Donna Martell as Marion Harrison
- John Phillips as Joe Moreley
- Reginald Billado as Cato

== See also ==
- Big Town radio series
- List of basketball films
