= Dynamite (1949 film) =

1949 film by William H. Pine

- Theatrical release poster
- Directed by: William H. Pine
- Written by: Milton Raison
- Produced by: William H. Pine; William C. Thomas
- Starring: William Gargan; Virginia Welles; Richard Crane; Irving Bacon; Mary Newton; Frank Ferguson
- Cinematography: Ellis W. Carter
- Edited by: Howard A. Smith
- Music by: Darrell Calker
- Production company: Pine-Thomas Productions
- Distributed by: Paramount Pictures
- Release date: January 18, 1949
- Running time: 68 minutes
- Country: United States
- Language: English

Dynamite is a 1949 American film noir drama film directed by William H. Pine and written by Milton Raison. The film stars William Gargan, Virginia Welles, Richard Crane, Irving Bacon, Mary Newton and Frank Ferguson. The film was released on January 18, 1949, by Paramount Pictures.

== Cast ==
- William Gargan as 'Gunner' Peterson
- Virginia Welles as Mary
- Richard Crane as Johnny Brown
- Irving Bacon as Jake
- Mary Newton as Nellie Brown
- Frank Ferguson as 'Hard Rock' Mason
- Douglass Dumbrille as Hank Gibbons

== Production ==
The film was originally called Hard to Kill and was to star Richard Travis who signed a four-picture deal with Pine Thomas.
