= Jungle Flight =

1947 film by Sam Newfield

- Theatrical release poster
- Directed by: Sam Newfield
- Screenplay by: Whitman Chambers
- Story by: David Lang
- Produced by: William H. Pine; William C. Thomas
- Starring: Robert Lowery; Ann Savage; Barton MacLane; Douglas Fowley; Robert Kent; Curt Bois
- Cinematography: Jack Greenhalgh
- Edited by: Howard A. Smith
- Music by: Darrell Calker
- Production company: Pine-Thomas Productions
- Distributed by: Paramount Pictures
- Release date: August 22, 1947
- Running time: 67 minutes
- Country: United States
- Language: English

Jungle Flight is a 1947 American adventure film directed by Sam Newfield and written by Whitman Chambers. The film stars Robert Lowery, Ann Savage, Barton MacLane, Douglas Fowley, Robert Kent and Curt Bois. The film was released on August 22, 1947, by Paramount Pictures.

== Plot ==
The movie revolves around Kelly Jordan (Robert Lowery) and Andy Melton (Robert Kent) who are former AAF fliers , who operate a cargo service near South American mountain ranges to fulfill their basic needs and to achieve their dream of Commercial Line in Texas. Andy got killed in a plane crash and then Kelly meet Laurey Roberts (Ann Savage), who helped him to get a new job at mining-camp as a cook. Laurey is also running away from her husband Tom Hammond (Douglas Fowley), who later catch up with Laurey but eventually killed in a gun fight and Kelly and Laurey leave for Texas.

== Cast ==
- Robert Lowery as Kelly Jordan
- Ann Savage as Laurey Roberts
- Barton MacLane as Case Hagin
- Douglas Fowley as Tom Hammond
- Robert Kent as Andy Melton
- Curt Bois as Pepe
- Duncan Renaldo as Police Capt. Costa
