= Speed to Spare (1948 film) =

1948 film by William A. Berke

- Theatrical release poster
- Directed by: William Berke
- Screenplay by: Milton Raison
- Produced by: William H. Pine; William C. Thomas
- Starring: Richard Arlen; Jean Rogers; Richard Travis; Roscoe Karns; Nanette Parks; Pat Phelan
- Cinematography: Ellis W. Carter
- Edited by: Monty Pearce
- Music by: Darrell Calker
- Production company: Pine-Thomas Productions
- Distributed by: Paramount Pictures
- Release date: May 14, 1948
- Running time: 57 minutes
- Country: United States
- Language: English

Speed to Spare is a 1948 American drama film directed by William Berke, written by Milton Raison, and starring Richard Arlen, Jean Rogers, Richard Travis, Roscoe Karns, Nanette Parks and Pat Phelan. It was released on May 14, 1948, by Paramount Pictures. It is unrelated to the same-titled auto-racing drama made by Columbia in 1937.

== Plot ==
Cliff Jordan, a stunt driver, accepts a job driving trucks for Jerry McGee, who is now married to Cliff's former love Mary. A rival, Pusher Wilkes, begins sabotaging Jerry's big rigs, placing Cliff in grave danger on the highway.

== Cast ==
- Richard Arlen as Cliff Jordan
- Jean Rogers as Mary McGee
- Richard Travis as Jerry McGee
- Roscoe Karns as "Kangaroo"
- Nanette Parks as Jane Chandler
- Pat Phelan as Pete Simmons
- Ian MacDonald as "Pusher" Wilkes
- Paul Harvey as Al Simmons

== Production ==
The film was known as High Speed.
