= Winston Miller =

American screenwriter

- Born: June 22, 1910; St. Louis, Missouri
- Died: June 21, 1994 (aged 83); Los Angeles
- Occupations: Screenwriter, film producer, actor
- Years active: 1922–1974

Winston Miller (June 22, 1910 – June 21, 1994) was an American screenwriter, film producer, and actor. He wrote for more than 60 films and television shows between 1936 and 1976. He began as an actor in silent films, appearing in eleven films between 1922 and 1929. He was the screenwriter for many TV series including Wagon Train Episode 13, Season 1 in 1957: "The Clara Beauchamp Story" with Nina Foch and Shepperd Strudwick. Earl Bellamy was the director.

He was born in St. Louis, Missouri, the younger brother of silent film star Patsy Ruth Miller. He died in Los Angeles from a heart attack.

== Selected filmography ==
- The Love Piker (1923)
- The Light That Failed (1923)
- Kentucky Pride (1925)
- Stella Dallas (1925)
- The Vigilantes Are Coming (1936)
- Dick Tracy (1937)
- The Painted Stallion (1938)
- The Royal Mounted Patrol (1941)
- Man from Cheyenne (1942)
- S.O.S. Coast Guard (1942)
- Good Morning, Judge (1943)
- Home in Indiana (1944)
- One Body Too Many (1944)
- Follow That Woman (1945)
- They Made Me a Killer (1946)
- My Darling Clementine (1946)
- Branded (1950)
- Hong Kong (1951)
- Lucy Gallant (1955)
- April Love (1957)
