= Maxwell Shane =

American film director

- Born: August 26, 1905; Paterson, New Jersey, U.S.
- Died: October 25, 1983 (aged 78); Woodland Hills, Los Angeles, U.S.
- Years active: 1946-1968

Maxwell Shane (August 26, 1905 – October 25, 1983) was an American movie and television director, screenwriter, and producer.

== Biography ==
Before embarking in a career in show business, Shane studied law at USC and UCLA law schools. He later became a journalist and moved on to become a Hollywood publicist. Along with David Hillman (father of musician Chris Hillman), he founded the Hillman-Shane Advertising Agency, in Los Angeles. Shane later became a screenwriter. Most of his early work was for forgettable low-budget films. Becoming a director in 1947, he worked on noirish films, as a writer or director, like Hell's Island, Fear in the Night and the remake Nightmare. Shane scripted City Across the River, the 1949 film of Irving Shulman's The Amboy Dukes, and directed 1955's The Naked Street, starring Anthony Quinn and Anne Bancroft.

In 1960, he became a writer-producer for the Boris Karloff anthology television series Thriller, for part of the series' first season. He later worked on a few episodes of The Virginian.

== Awards ==
Year	Result	Award	Category	Film or series
1953	Won	Locarno International Film Festival	Artistic Quality	The Glass Wall (Tied with Julius Caesar and Kompozitor Glinka)
