= Strange Stories =

Strange Stories may refer to:

- Strange Stories (magazine), 1939–1941 American pulp magazine
- Strange Stories (film), 1953 British film
- Strange Stories (TV series), 1956 American TV series

== See also ==
- Strange Tales (disambiguation)
