= Strange Tales (disambiguation) =

Strange Tales is a Marvel Comics anthology series title that appeared and was revived in different forms on multiple occasions throughout the company's history.

Strange Tales may also refer to:

- Strange Tales (album), an album by The Humans
- Strange Tales, a Pink Floyd bootleg recording
- Strange Tales (digest magazine), a British science fiction magazine
- Strange Tales (pulp magazine), an American fantasy fiction magazine
- Strange Tales from a Chinese Studio, one of the main English translated title for the Chinese literary classic Liaozhai zhiyi

== See also ==
- Strange Stories (disambiguation)
- Weird fiction, a genre of speculative fiction
- Ajeeb Daastaans (lit. 'Strange Tales'), a 2021 Indian Hindi-language film
- Ajeeb Daastaan Hai Ye (lit. 'This is a strange tale'), an Indian Hindi-language TV series
- "Ajeeb Dastan Hai Yeh" (song), a song by Lata Mangeshkar from the 1960 Indian film Dil Apna Aur Preet Parai
