= Marguerite Chapman filmography =

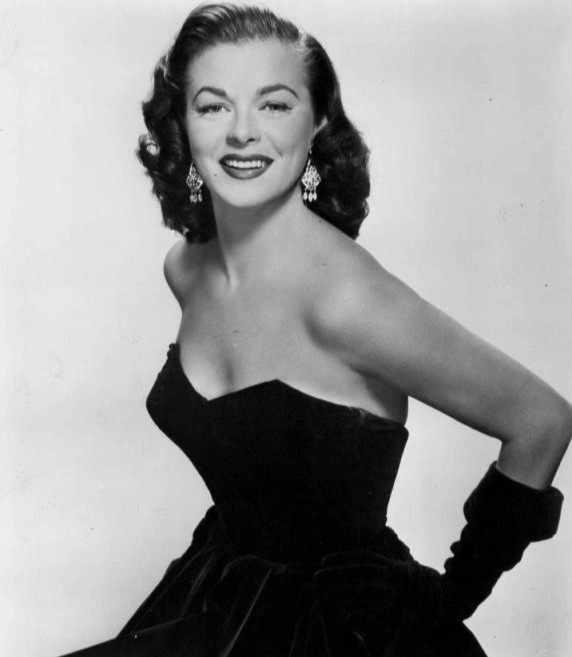
Chapman in 1953

This is the complete filmography of actress Marguerite Chapman (March 9, 1918 – August 31, 1999).

Born in Chatham, New York, she had humble beginnings as a typist and switchboard operator in White Plains, New York, until her beauty was brought to the attention of the John Powers Modeling Agency in New York City, where she went on to become a high-demand pictorial and magazine model.

Relocating to Los Angeles, California, in December 1939, she would appear in several westerns, musicals, comedies, and dramas within the next two decades, working with such major studios as 20th Century Fox, Warner Bros., Republic Pictures, and Columbia. She later became a household name through television, appearing on several well-known sitcoms of the day throughout the 1950s up until her retirement in 1977.

== Film and television appearances ==
- 1940: On Their Own as Margaret
- 1940: Four Sons as Peasant (uncredited)
- 1940: Charlie Chan at the Wax Museum as Mary Bolton
- 1941: A Girl, a Guy, and a Gob as Cecilia Grange
- 1941: The Great Lie as Enthusiastic Film Fan in Trailer (uncredited)
- 1941: Navy Blues as Navy Blues Sextet member
- 1941: West of the Rockies (Short)
- 1941: The Body Disappears as Christine Lunceford
- 1941: You're in the Army Now as Navy Blues Sextette member
- 1942: The Playgirls (Short) as Sextette member
- 1942: Spy Smasher as Eve Corby
- 1942: Meet the Stewarts as Ann (uncredited)
- 1942: Submarine Raider as Sue Curry
- 1942: Parachute Nurse as Glenda White
- 1942: A Man's World as Mona Jackson
- 1942: Daring Young Man as Ann Minter
- 1942: The Spirit of Stanford as Fay Edwards
- 1943: One Dangerous Night as Eve Andrews
- 1943: Murder in Times Square as Melinda Matthews
- 1943: Appointment in Berlin as Ilse Von Preising
- 1943: Destroyer as Mary Boleslavski
- 1943: My Kingdom for a Cook as Pamela Morley
- 1944: Strange Affair as Marie Dumont Baumler
- 1945: Counter-Attack as Lisa Elenko
- 1945: Pardon My Past as Joan
- 1946: One Way to Love as Marcia Winthrop
- 1946: The Walls Came Tumbling Down as Patricia Foster, AKA Laura Browning
- 1947: Mr. District Attorney as Marcia Manning
- 1948: Relentless as Luella Purdy
- 1948: Coroner Creek as Kate Hardison
- 1948: The Gallant Blade as Nanon de Lartigues
- 1949: The Green Promise as Deborah Matthews
- 1950: Kansas Raiders as Kate Clarke
- 1951 The Bigelow Theatre (TV Series)
- 1951: Flight to Mars as Alita
- 1952: Man Bait as Stella Tracy
- 1952: Sea Tiger as Jenine Duval
- 1952: Bloodhounds of Broadway as Yvonne Dugan
- 1952–1953: Chevron Theatre (TV Series)
- 1953: Fireside Theatre (TV Series) as Wanda Brown
- 1953: Schlitz Playhouse (TV Series) as Vicky
- 1953: Hollywood Opening Night (TV Series)
- 1953: The Revlon Mirror Theater (TV Series) as Elaine Merrill
- 1953–1954: The Pepsi-Cola Playhouse (TV Series) as Ann Scotland / Barbara Nicholson
- 1954: Four Star Playhouse (TV Series) as Lisa / Linda
- 1954: Private Secretary (TV Series) as Dorian France
- 1955: The Whistler (TV Series) as Fran Gilbert
- 1953–1955: City Detective (TV Series) as Rose / Leona
- 1955: The Seven Year Itch as Miss Morris
- 1955: Science Fiction Theatre (TV Series) as Jean Forester
- 1955: Jane Wyman Presents The Fireside Theatre (TV Series) as Janet
- 1955: The Star and the Story (TV Series)
- 1956: Celebrity Playhouse (TV Series)
- 1956: TV Reader's Digest (TV Series) as Nancy Drake
- 1956: Strange Stories (TV Series) as Ann Scotland
- 1955–1956: Lux Video Theatre (TV Series) as Lenore / Jane Drake / Linda
- 1952–1957: The Ford Television Theatre (TV Series) as Louise / Beth Rathburn
- 1954–1957: Studio 57 (TV Series) as Ann Scotland / Janet / Pamela, American Official / Phyllis Warrender
- 1957: The Eve Arden Show (TV Series) as Mother
- 1955–1957: Climax! (TV Series) as Kitty / Wife / Mrs. Carter / Myra Saunders
- 1958: Studio One in Hollywood (TV Series) as Laura Adams
- 1958: Richard Diamond, Private Detective (TV Series) as Norma Randall
- 1958: The Millionaire (TV Series) as Myra Putnam
- 1958: Pursuit (TV Series)
- 1959: Rawhide (TV Series) as Madge
- 1959: The Ann Sothern Show (TV Series) as Stella
- 1959: The Lineup (TV Series) as Cara
- 1960: The Amazing Transparent Man as Laura Matson
- 1960: Perry Mason (TV Series) as Faye Donner
- 1961: Laramie (TV Series) as Valerie Farrell
- 1962: Frontier Circus (TV Series) as Theresa Haskill
- 1971: Marcus Welby, M.D. (TV Series) as Angie's mother
- 1975: Hawaii Five-O (TV Series) as Patron
- 1976: Police Story (TV Series) as Becky
- 1977: Barnaby Jones (TV Series) as Operator (final appearance)
