= John Edward Chilberg II =

John Edward Chilberg II (September 24, 1929 in California – March 2, 1987 in Los Angeles, California, United States) was a noted American production designer and art director. He was a member of the Swedish-American Chilberg family, and his grandfather John Edward Chilberg was the director of the 1909 Alaska–Yukon–Pacific Exposition. John is mostly known as the art director in Star Trek III: The Search for Spock at Paramount Pictures, and his work in television series like Dragnet, Dynasty, The Colbys, and miniseries as Rich Man, Poor Man. He was mostly credited as: John E. Chilberg II, and sometimes credited as: Jack E. Chilberg II, Jack Chilberg, John E. Childberg II, John Chilberg, John E. Chilberg, John E. Childberg, John Childberg, Jack Childberg. John was very productive in his work between 1968 and 1986. He died in 1987, aged 57, in Los Angeles, California.

John was nominated twice for Emmy Awards, in 1979 for Outstanding Art Direction for a Series: Battlestar Galactica episode "Saga of a Star World" together with others, and in 1981 for Outstanding Art Direction for a Series: Dynasty premiere episode(#1): "Oil" also together with others.
