= Fear in the Night =

Fear in the Night may refer to:

- Fear in the Night (1947 film), an American film directed by Maxwell Shane
- Fear in the Night (1972 film), a British film directed by Jimmy Sangster
