= DeForest Kelley =

American actor (1920–1999)

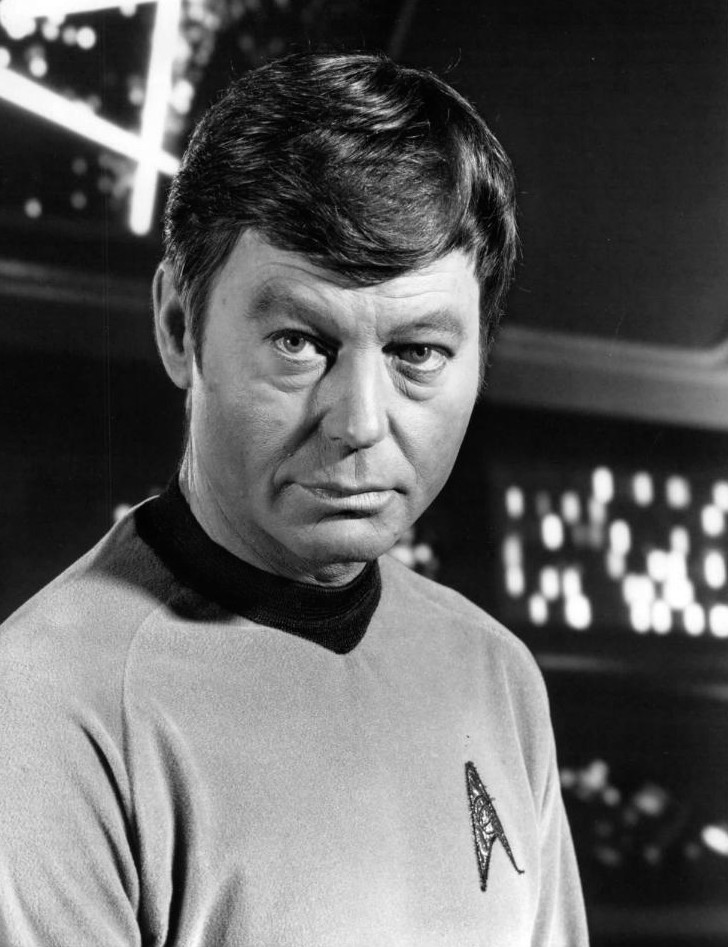
- Publicity photo of Kelley as Dr. McCoy from the television program Star Trek
- Born: Jackson DeForest Kelley; January 20, 1920; Toccoa, Georgia, U.S.
- Died: June 11, 1999 (aged 79); Los Angeles, California, U.S.
- Occupation: Actor
- Years active: 1940–1998
- Known for: Leonard "Bones" McCoy
- Spouse: Carolyn Dowling (m. 1945)
- Awards: Hollywood Walk of Fame; Golden Boot Award

Jackson DeForest Kelley (January 20, 1920 – June 11, 1999) was an American actor, screenwriter, poet, and singer. He was known for his roles in film and television Westerns and achieved international fame as Dr. Leonard "Bones" McCoy of the USS Enterprise in the television and film series Star Trek (1966–1991).

== Early life ==
Kelley was born in Toccoa, Georgia. His mother was Clora (née Casey) and his father was Ernest David Kelley, a Baptist minister of Irish ancestry. Kelley was named after pioneering electronics engineer Lee de Forest. He later named his Star Trek character's father "David" after his own father. Kelley had an older brother, Ernest Casey Kelley. Kelley was immersed in his father's mission at his father's church in Conyers, Georgia.

Before the end of his first year at Conyers, Kelley was regularly putting to use his musical talents and often sang solo in morning church services. Kelley wanted to become a doctor like his uncle, but his family could not afford to send him to medical school. He began singing on local radio shows, including an appearance on WSB AM in Atlanta. As a result of Kelley's radio work, he won an engagement with Lou Forbes and his orchestra at the Paramount Theater.

In 1934, the family left Conyers for Decatur, Georgia. He attended the Decatur Boys High School, where he played on the Decatur Bantams baseball team. Kelley also played football and other sports. Before his graduation in 1938, Kelley got a job as a drugstore car hop. He spent his weekends working in the local theaters.

He made his film debut in the chorus of New Moon (1940) and nearly secured the lead role in This Gun for Hire (1942), but Alan Ladd was chosen, instead.

During World War II, Kelley served as an enlisted man in the United States Army Air Forces from March 10, 1943, to January 28, 1946, assigned to the First Motion Picture Unit with the rank of private first class. After an extended stay in Long Beach, California, Kelley decided to pursue an acting career and relocate to Southern California permanently, living for a time with his uncle Casey. He worked as an usher in a local theater to earn enough money for the move. Kelley's mother encouraged her son in his new career goal, but his father disliked the idea. While in California, Kelley was spotted by a Paramount Pictures scout while appearing in a United States Navy training film.

In 1945, Kelley married Carolyn Charlotte Meagher Dowling.

== Career ==
=== Early roles ===
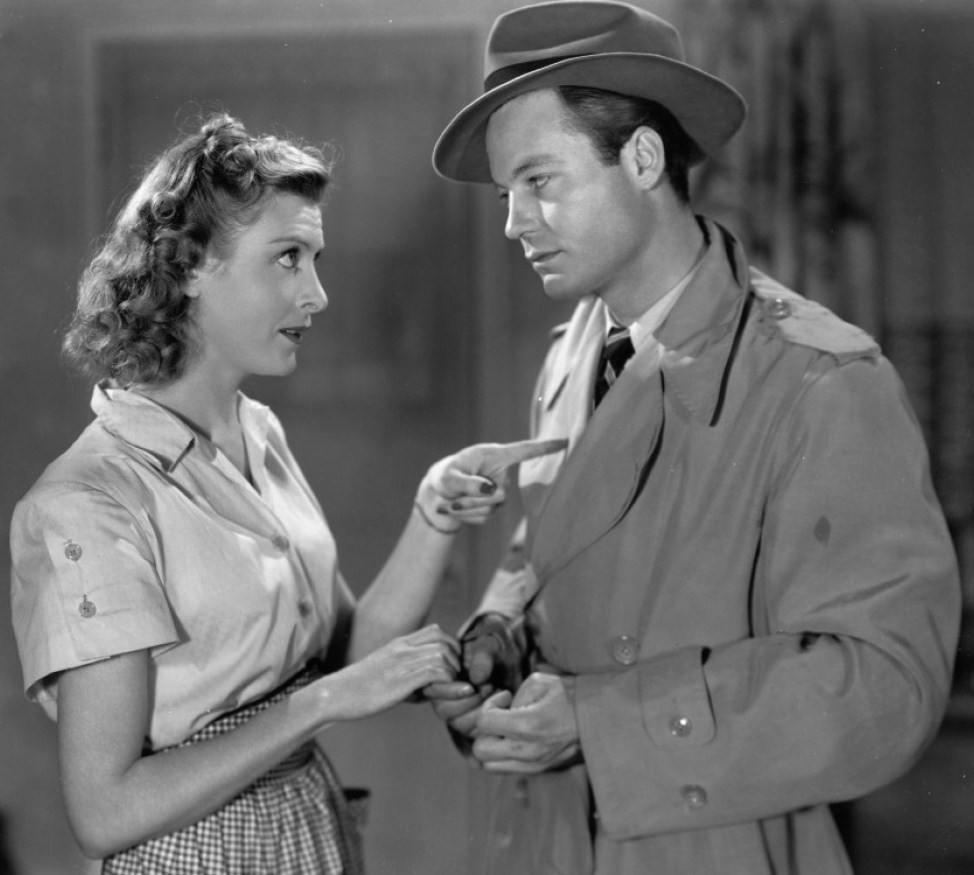
Ann Doran and Kelley in Fear in the Night in 1947

Kelley's acting career began with the feature film Fear in the Night in 1947. The low-budget movie was a hit, bringing him to the attention of a national audience and giving Kelley reason to believe he would soon become a star. His next role, in Variety Girl, established him as a leading actor and resulted in the founding of his first fan club. Kelley did not become a leading man, however, and his wife Carolyn and he decided to move to New York City. He found work on stage and on live television, but after three years in New York, the Kelleys returned to Hollywood.

In California, he received a role in an installment of You Are There, anchored by Walter Cronkite. He played ranch owner Bob Kitteridge in the 1949 episode "Legion of Old Timers" of the television series The Lone Ranger. This led to an appearance in Gunfight at the O.K. Corral as Morgan Earp (brother to Burt Lancaster's Wyatt Earp), which in turn led to three movie offers, including Warlock with Henry Fonda and Anthony Quinn.

DeForest Kelley appeared in three episodes of the television series Science Fiction Theatre. In 1957, he had a small role as a Southern officer in Raintree County, a Civil War film directed by Edward Dmytryk, alongside Elizabeth Taylor, Montgomery Clift, and Lee Marvin. He also appeared in leading roles as a U.S. Navy submarine captain in the television series, The Silent Service. He appeared in season one, episode five, "The Spearfish Delivers", as Commander Dempsey, and in the first episode of season two, "The Archerfish Spits Straight", as Lieutenant Commander Enright. His future Star Trek co-star Leonard Nimoy also appeared in two different episodes of the series around the same time.

Kelley appeared three times in various depictions of the gunfight at the O.K. Corral. The first was in 1955, as Ike Clanton in the television series You Are There, followed two years later in the 1957 film Gunfight at the O.K. Corral. The third was in the October 25, 1968 Star Trek episode, "Spectre of the Gun", as Tom McLaury.

Kelley, known to colleagues as "Dee", also appeared in episodes of The Donna Reed Show, Perry Mason, Tales of Wells Fargo, Wanted: Dead or Alive, Boots and Saddles, Dick Powell's Zane Grey Theatre, Death Valley Days, Riverboat, The Fugitive, Lawman, Bat Masterson, Gunsmoke, Have Gun – Will Travel, The Millionaire, Rawhide, and Laredo. He appeared in the 1962 episode of Route 66, "1800 Days to Justice" and "The Clover Throne" as Willis. He had a small role in the movie The View from Pompey's Head.

For nine years, Kelley primarily played villains. He built up an extensive list of credits, alternating between television and motion pictures. He was afraid of typecasting, though, so he broke away from villains by starring in Where Love Has Gone and a television pilot called 333 Montgomery. The pilot was written by an ex-policeman named Gene Roddenberry, and a few years later, Kelley appeared in another Roddenberry pilot, Police Story (1967), that was again not developed into a series.

Kelley also appeared in at least one radio drama, the 1957 episode of Suspense entitled "Flesh Peddler", in which series producer William M. Robson introduced him as "a bright new luminary in the Hollywood firmament".

Kelley played a doctor several times before he did so in Star Trek. In 1956, nine years before being cast as Dr. McCoy, Kelley played a small supporting role as a medic in The Man in the Gray Flannel Suit, in which he utters the diagnosis "This man's dead, Captain" and "That man is dead" to Gregory Peck. In 1962, he appeared in the Bonanza episode titled "The Decision", as a doctor sentenced to hang for the murder of a journalist. (The judge in this episode was portrayed by John Hoyt, who later portrayed Dr. Phillip John Boyce, one of Leonard McCoy's predecessors, on the Star Trek pilot "The Cage".) In 1963, he appeared in The Virginian episode "Man of Violence" as a "drinking" cavalry doctor with Leonard Nimoy as his patient. (That episode was written by John D. F. Black, who went on to become a writer-producer on Star Trek.) Just before Star Trek began filming, Kelley appeared as a doctor again, in the Laredo episode "The Sound of Terror".

=== Star Trek ===
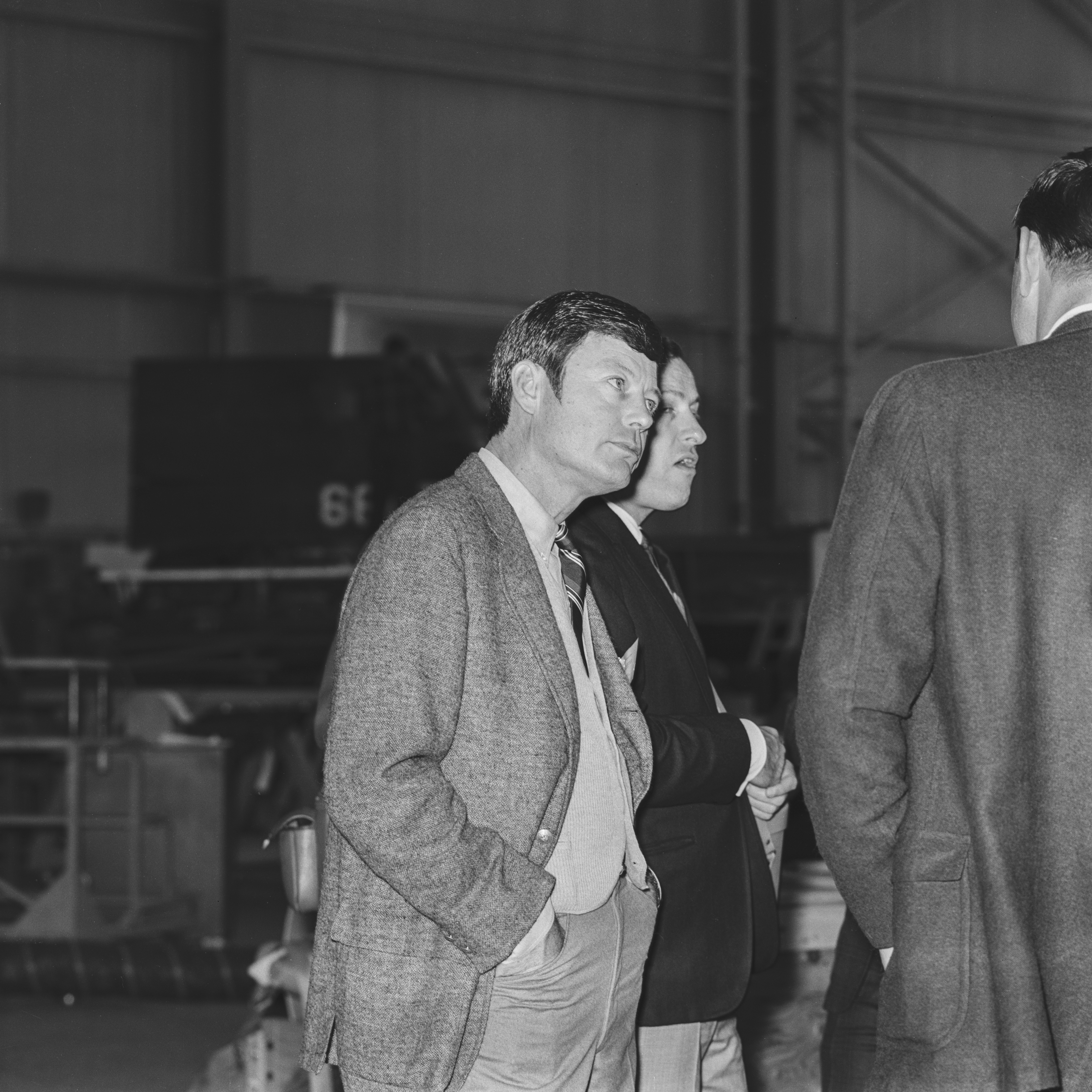
Kelley visiting NASA Dryden with the Star Trek cast and crew in 1967

Kelley played Dr. Leonard "Bones" McCoy from 1966 to 1969 in Star Trek (Gene Roddenberry had offered Kelley the role of Spock in 1964, but he refused it). He reprised the character in a voice-over role in the animated Star Trek series (1973–74), and the first six Star Trek motion pictures (1979 to 1991). In 1987, he also had a cameo in "Encounter at Farpoint", the first episode of Star Trek: The Next Generation, as the 137-year-old Admiral Leonard McCoy. Several aspects of Kelley's background became part of McCoy's characterization, including his pronunciation of "nuclear" as "nucular".

Kelley became a good friend of Star Trek castmates William Shatner and Leonard Nimoy, from their first meeting in 1964. During Trek's first season, Kelley's name was listed in the end credits along with the rest of the cast. Only Shatner and Nimoy were listed in the opening credits. As Kelley's role grew in importance during the first season, he received a pay raise to about US$2,500 (equivalent to about $24,100 in 2025) per episode and received third billing starting in the second season after Nimoy. Despite the show's recognition of Kelley as one of its stars, he was frustrated by the greater attention that Shatner received as its lead actor and that Nimoy received because of "Spockamania" among fans.

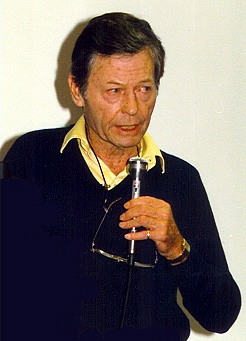
Kelley at Star Trek convention in 1988

Shy by his own admission, Kelley was the only cast member of the original Star Trek series program never to have written or published an autobiography; the authorized biography From Sawdust to Stardust (2005) was written posthumously by Terry Lee Rioux of Lamar University in Beaumont, Texas. Kelley regarded "The Empath" as his favorite Star Trek television episode.

=== Later career ===
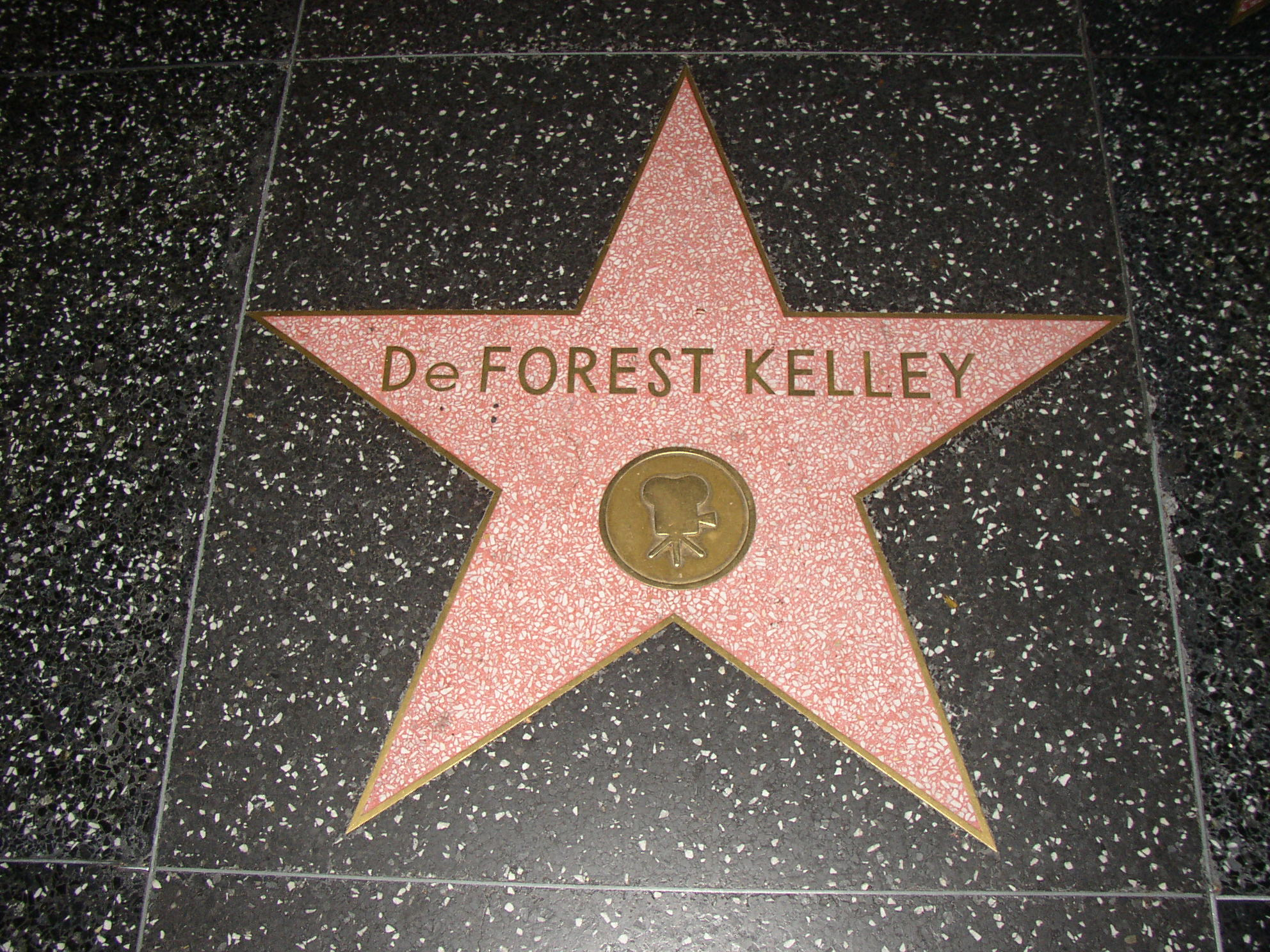
Hollywood Walk of Fame

After Star Trek was canceled in 1969, Kelley found himself a victim of the very typecasting he had so feared. In 1972, he was cast in the horror film Night of the Lepus. After that, Kelley made occasional appearances on television and in film, but essentially went into de facto retirement, other than playing McCoy in the Star Trek film series. By 1978, he was annually earning up to $50,000 (equivalent to about $247,000 in 2025) from appearances at Star Trek conventions. Like other Star Trek actors, Kelley received little of the enormous profits that the franchise generated for Paramount, until Nimoy, as executive producer, helped arrange for Kelley to be paid $1 million (equivalent to about $2.4M in 2025) for Star Trek VI: The Undiscovered Country (1991), which was his final live-action film appearance. In 1987, he appeared in the first Star Trek: The Next Generation episode, "Encounter at Farpoint", in which he portrayed a 137-year-old Dr. McCoy. For his final film, Kelley provided the voice of Viking 1 in The Brave Little Toaster Goes to Mars. Later in life, Kelley developed an interest in poetry, eventually publishing the first of two books in an unfinished series, The Big Bird's Dream and The Dream Goes On.

In a TLC interview done in the late 1990s, Kelley joked that one of his biggest fears was that the words etched on his gravestone would be "He's dead, Jim". Kelley's obituary in Newsweek began: "We're not even going to try to resist: He's dead, Jim". He stated the year before his death that his legacy would be the many people McCoy had inspired to become doctors; "That's something that very few people can say they've done. I'm proud to say that I have". In 1991, Kelley received a star on the Hollywood Walk of Fame. In 1999, shortly before he died, he was awarded a Golden Boot award for his contribution to the genre of Western television and movies.

== Personal life ==
Kelley met actress Carolyn Dowling in 1942 when both were actors in a play. They married in 1945, exchanging two 25-cent Indian rings, and remained married for nearly 55 years until Kelley's death, living in a one-story ranch house in Sherman Oaks, California. The couple, who had no children, "were the most loving couple you've ever seen in your life," said Star Trek's Majel Barrett. The couple were also famous animal lovers. While they had no children, they did adopt some animals, most famously Myrtle the Turtle and a half Schnauzer/half Poodle named Cheers.

=== Health and death ===
Kelley was diagnosed with stomach cancer in 1997, from which he died on June 11, 1999 at the age of 79 attended by his wife at the Motion Picture and Television Country House and Hospital in Woodland Hills, Los Angeles. His remains were cremated and the ashes were spread over the Pacific Ocean.

== Filmography ==
=== Film ===
Year	Title	Role	Notes
1940	New Moon	Chorus	
1945	Time to Kill	Peter	Short film
1947	Fear in the Night	Vince Grayson	
1947	Variety Girl	Bob Kirby	
1947	Beyond Our Own	Bob Rogers	
1948	Gypsy Holiday	Carl Romano	Short film
1948	Canon City	Smalley	
1949	Duke of Chicago	'Ace' Martin	
1949	Malaya	Lt. Glenson	Uncredited
1949	Life of St. Paul Series	Aram	
1950	The Men	Dr. Sherman	Uncredited
1953	Taxi	Fred	Uncredited
1954	Duffy of San Quentin	Eddie Lee – Police Detective	Uncredited
1955	House of Bamboo	Charlie	Uncredited
1955	Illegal	Edward Clary	
1955	The View from Pompey's Head	Jim Foster – Hotel Clerk	Uncredited
1956	The Man in the Gray Flannel Suit	Medic	Uncredited
1956	Tension at Table Rock	Jim Breck	
1957	Gunfight at the O.K. Corral	Morgan Earp	
1957	Raintree County	Southern Officer	
1958	The Law and Jake Wade	Wexler	
1959	Warlock	Curley Burne	
1963	Gunfight at Comanche Creek	Amos Troop	
1964	Where Love Has Gone	Sam Corwin	
1965	Black Spurs	Sheriff Dal Nemo	
1965	Town Tamer	Guy Tavenner	
1965	Marriage on the Rocks	Mr. Turner	
1965	Apache Uprising	Toby Jack Saunders	
1966	Johnny Reno		Uncredited
1966	Waco	Bill Rile	
1972	Night of the Lepus	Elgin Clark	
1979	Star Trek: The Motion Picture	Dr. Leonard McCoy	
1982	Star Trek II: The Wrath of Khan	Dr. Leonard McCoy	
1984	Star Trek III: The Search for Spock	Dr. Leonard McCoy	
1986	Star Trek IV: The Voyage Home	Dr. Leonard McCoy	
1989	Star Trek V: The Final Frontier	Dr. Leonard McCoy	
1991	Star Trek VI: The Undiscovered Country	Dr. Leonard McCoy	
1991	Star Trek Adventure	Dr. Leonard McCoy	Short film
1998	The Brave Little Toaster Goes to Mars	Viking 1 (voice)	Direct-to-video

=== Television ===
Year	Title	Role	Notes
1947	Public Prosecutor	Danny Watson	Episode: "The Case of the Man Who Wasn't There"
1949–1953	The Lone Ranger	Doctor Barnes / Sheriff / Bob Kittredge	3 episodes
1950	Studio One	Bob Philo	Episode: "The Last Cruise"
1952	Armstrong Circle Theatre		Episode: "Breakaway"
1952	Your Jeweler's Showcase		Episode: "The Hand of St. Pierre"
1953	The Revlon Mirror Theater	Bert Dexter	Episode: "Dreams Never Lie"
1953	The Pepsi-Cola Playhouse	Jeff	Episode: "Frozen Escape"
1953–1954	Your Favorite Story	John Ainslee	3 episodes
1953–1954	City Detective	Hartfield / Benjamin	2 episodes
1953–1956	You Are There	Soldier / Al Hammill / Maj. Bremen / Ike Clanton / Lt. Col. Everton Conger	9 episodes
1954	Waterfront	Bob Vogelin / Lloyd Allen	2 episodes
1954	The Lone Wolf	Nick Kohler / Ted Hopkins	2 episodes
1954	Public Defender	Mr. Sanders	Episode: "The Murder Photo"
1954	Cavalcade of America		Episode: "A Medal for Miss Walker"
1954–1955	Mayor of the Town	Nash / Tracey	3 episodes
1954–1955	Studio 57	Alfred / Ted Lance	2 episodes
1955	The Loretta Young Show	Pilot	Episode: "Decision"
1955	The Millionaire	Dr. Michael Wells	Episode: "The Iris Millar Story"
1955–1956	Science Fiction Theatre	Dr. Milo Barton / Matt Brander / Captain Hall, M.D.	3 episodes
1955–1956	Matinee Theatre	Alan Brecker / Frank Lawson	2 episodes
1956	Gunsmoke	Will Bailey	Episode: "Indian Scout"
1956	Strange Stories	Harvey Harris	Episode: "Such a Nice Little Girl"
1956–1960	Dick Powell's Zane Grey Theatre	Swain / Logan Wheeler / Sherm Pickard / Les Porter	4 episodes
1957	Navy Log	Captain Smithwick / Corporal	2 episodes
1957	The O. Henry Playhouse		2 episodes
1957	The Adventures of Jim Bowie	Dr. Robert Taber	Episode: "An Eye for an Eye"
1957	Code 3	Deputy Don Reason	Episode: "Oil Well Incident"
1957	Schlitz Playhouse of Stars	Jordan Haig	Episode: "Hands of the Enemy"
1957	The Web	Detective Lt. Johnny Wright	Episode: "Kill and Run"
1957	Boots and Saddles	Merriweather	Episode: "The Marquis of Donnybrook"
1957–1958	The Silent Service	Lt. Comm. Enright / Ferrara / Commander Dempsey	Episode: "The Archerfish Spits Straight" 3 episodes
1957–1958	M Squad	Police Sgt. Miller / Detective	3 episodes
1957–1958	Playhouse 90	Lambert	2 episodes
1957–1959	Trackdown	Tom Dooley / Ed Crow / Brock Childers / Perry Grimes	4 episodes
1958	Steve Canyon	Radar Major	Season1/Episode 5: "Operation Jettison"
1958	The Rough Riders	Lance	Episode: "The Nightbinders"
1958–1960	Alcoa Theatre	Jake Brittin / Marshal	2 episodes
1959	The Californians	Joe Girard	Episode: "The Painted Lady"
1959	26 Men	Ed Lacy	Episode: "Trail of Revenge"
1959	Special Agent 7	Martin	Episode: "Border Masquerade"
1959	Northwest Passage	David Cooper	Episode: "Death Rides the Wind"
1959	Wanted: Dead or Alive	Ollie Tate / Sheriff Steve Pax	2 episodes
1959	Rawhide	Slate Prell	Episode: "Incident at Barker Springs"
1959	Mackenzie's Raiders	Charles Barron / El Halcon	Episode: "Son of the Hawk"
1959	State Trooper	Graham Jones	Episode: "The Patient Skeleton"
1959	The Lineup		Episode: "The Chloroform Murder Case"
1959	Richard Diamond, Private Detective	Kenneth Porter / Sheriff	2 episodes
1959	Mickey Spillane's Mike Hammer	Eddie Robbins / Philip Conroy	2 episodes
1959	21 Beacon Street	George Manning	Episode: "The Hostage"
1959	Walt Disney Presents	Silas Morgan	Episode: "Elfego Baca: Mustang Man, Mustang Maid"
1959	Black Saddle	Sam King	Episode: "Apache Trail"
1960	Johnny Midnight	David Lawton	Episode: "The Inner Eye"
1960	Markham	Danny Standish	Episode: "Counterpoint"
1960	Two Faces West	Vern Cleary	Episode: "Fallen Gun"
1960–1961	Lawman	Bent Carr / Sam White	2 episodes
1960–1961	Coronado 9	Shep Harlow / Frank Briggs	2 episodes
1961	Riverboat	Alex Jeffords	Episode: "Listen to the Nightingale"
1961	Tales of Wells Fargo	Captain Cole Scofield	Episode: "Captain Scofield"
1961	Assignment: Underwater	Barney	Episode: "Affair in Tokyo"
1961	Stagecoach West	Lt. Clarke / Clay Henchard	2 episodes
1961	The Deputy	Farley Styles	Episode: "The Means and the End"
1961	Bat Masterson	Brock Martin	Episode: "No Amnesty for Death"
1961	Shannon	Carlyle	Episode: "The Pickup"
1961	Cain's Hundred	Bob Tully	Episode: "The Fixer"
1961	Perry Mason	Peter Thorpe	Episode: "The Case of the Unwelcome Bride"
1961–1962	Route 66	Bob Harcourt Jr. / H. Norbert Willis	2 episodes
1961–1966	Bonanza	Tully / Dr. Michael Jons / Captain Moss Johnson	4 episodes
1962	Have Gun – Will Travel	Deakin	Episode: "The Treasure"
1962–1963	Laramie	Jack / Bart Collins	2 episodes
1962–1963	Death Valley Days	Elliott Webster / Martin - Prisoner / Clint Rogers / Shad Cullen	4 episodes
1963	The Virginian	Lt. Beldon / Ben Tully	2 episodes
1963	The Gallant Men	Col. Davenport	Episode: "A Taste of Peace"
1963	The Dakotas	Martin Volet	Episode: "Reformation at Big Nose Butte"
1963	77 Sunset Strip	Phil Wingate	Episode: "88 Bars"
1964	Slattery's People	Gregg Wilson	Episode: "Question: Which One Has the Privilege?"
1965	The Fugitive	Charlie	Episode: "Three Cheers for Little Boy Blue"
1965	The Donna Reed Show	Williams	Episode: "Uncle Jeff Needs You"
1966	A Man Called Shenandoah	Egan	Episode: "The Riley Brand"
1966	Laredo	Dr. David Ingram	Episode: "Sound of Terror"
1966–1969	Star Trek	Dr. Leonard McCoy	76 episodes
1967	Police Story	Lab Chief Greene	Television film
1970	Ironside	Mr. Fowler	Episode: "Warrior's Return"
1970	The Silent Force	Curston	Episode: "The Judge"
1970	The Bold Ones: The New Doctors	Parrish	Episode: "Giants Never Kneel"
1971	Owen Marshall, Counselor at Law	Frank Slater	Episode: "Make No Mistake"
1971	Room 222	Matt Silverton	Episode: "The Sins of the Fathers"
1972	The Bull of the West	Ben Tully	Television film
1973	The ABC Afternoon Playbreak	Dr. Goldstone	Episode: "I Never Said Goodbye"
1973–1974	Star Trek: The Animated Series	Dr. McCoy (voice)	22 episodes
1974	The Cowboys	Jack Potter	Episode: "David Done It"
1981	The Littlest Hobo	Prof. Hal Schaffer	Episode: "Runaway"
1987	Star Trek: The Next Generation	Admiral Leonard McCoy	Episode: "Encounter at Farpoint"

=== Video games ===
Year	Title	Role	Notes
1994	Star Trek: 25th Anniversary	Dr. Leonard 'Bones' McCoy	CD-ROM version
1995	Star Trek: Judgment Rites	Dr. Leonard 'Bones' McCoy	CD-ROM version
1999	Star Trek: Secret of Vulcan Fury	Dr. Leonard 'Bones' McCoy	Canceled

== Awards and nominations ==
Year	Award	Category	Production	Result
1991	Hollywood Walk of Fame	Star on the Walk of Fame - Motion Picture		Won
1999	Golden Boot Award	Memoriam Award	Western film	Won
2020	Online Film & Television Association	OFTA TV Hall of Fame - Actors and Actresses		Won
