= Chilberg family =

Swedish-American family

Chilberg (alternate spellings include Killberg and Kylburg) is a Swedish-American family that came from Knäred, Halland, Sweden, to America in 1846 with the boat Superb, starting their journey in Gothenburg to arrive in Philadelphia. This family were early American pioneers moving west, from Sweden, to Bergholm in Wapello, Iowa, with a short period in Oregon to finally settle in the Skagit Valley at Pleasant Ridge, La Conner, Skagit County, Washington. John Edward Chilberg later moved to Seattle as a child in the early 1870s.

== Prominent members ==
The oldest known family member was Karl Killberg, a parish clerk living 1695 in Hishult, Halland, Sweden. One account of the family's migration to the US states that the family settled in Seattle and owned a grocer and a knitting house, the very first Scandinavian businesses in Seattle. The success of the grocer, which was called Childberg Brothers, led to other business ventures.

The most prominent members of the American branch of the family include John Edward Chilberg, the president of the Alaska-Yukon-Pacific Exposition in 1909-1910. John Edward was the grandson of Carl Johan Chilberg, who had come to the United States in the 1840s. He got into shipping and became the secretary of the Puget Sound & Central American Steamship Co. in 1898 and president of the Seattle Shipyards Co. in 1906. His uncle, Andrew Chilberg, served as the president of the Scandinavian American Bank of Seattle and in 1879 he became the vice-consul of Sweden and Norway. John Edward Chilberg II, the grandson of John Edward Chilberg, was a very active American production designer and art director.

From the branches still living in Sweden, there was Johan Peter Killberg, who started the Killberg Book Stores in Ängelholm and Helsingborg.
