= Star Trek III: The Search for Spock =

1984 US science fiction film by Leonard Nimoy

- Theatrical release poster art by Bob Peak
- Directed by: Leonard Nimoy
- Written by: Harve Bennett
- Based on: Star Trek by Gene Roddenberry
- Produced by: Harve Bennett
- Starring: William Shatner; DeForest Kelley; James Doohan; George Takei; Walter Koenig; Nichelle Nichols; Merritt Butrick; Christopher Lloyd
- Cinematography: Charles Correll
- Edited by: Robert F. Shugrue
- Music by: James Horner
- Production company: Paramount Pictures
- Distributed by: Paramount Pictures
- Release date: June 1, 1984
- Running time: 105 minutes
- Country: United States
- Language: English
- Budget: $16 million
- Box office: $87 million

Star Trek III: The Search for Spock is a 1984 American science fiction film, written and produced by Harve Bennett, directed by Leonard Nimoy, and based on the television series Star Trek. It is the third film in the Star Trek franchise and is the second part of a three-film story arc that begins with Star Trek II: The Wrath of Khan (1982) and concludes with Star Trek IV: The Voyage Home (1986). After the death of Spock (Nimoy), the crew of the USS Enterprise return to Earth. When James T. Kirk (William Shatner) learns that Spock's spirit, or katra, is held in the mind of Dr. Leonard "Bones" McCoy (DeForest Kelley), Kirk and company steal the decommissioned USS Enterprise to return Spock's body to his homeworld. The crew must also contend with hostile Klingons, led by Kruge (Christopher Lloyd), who are bent on stealing the secrets of the powerful terraforming device, Genesis.

Paramount Pictures commissioned the film after the positive critical and commercial reaction to The Wrath of Khan. Nimoy directed this film, becoming the first Star Trek cast member to do so in addition to making his feature directorial debut. Producer Harve Bennett wrote the script, starting from the end and working backwards, and intended the destruction of the Enterprise to be a shocking development.

Bennett and Nimoy collaborated with effects house Industrial Light & Magic to develop storyboards and new ship designs; ILM also handled the film's many special effects sequences. Aside from a single day of location shooting, the film was shot entirely on Paramount and ILM soundstages. Composer James Horner returned to expand his themes from the previous film.

The Search for Spock opened on June 1, 1984. In its first week of release, the film grossed over $16 million from almost 2,000 theaters across North America. It went on to gross $76 million at the domestic box office, with a total of $87 million worldwide. Critical reaction to The Search for Spock was generally positive, but notably less so than the previous film. Reviewers generally praised the cast, Nimoy's direction, and characters, while criticism tended to focus on the plot; the special effects were conflictingly received. Roger Ebert called the film a compromise between the tones of the first and second Star Trek films.

== Plot ==
The Federation starship Enterprise limps back to Earth following a battle with the superhuman Khan Noonien Singh, who tried to destroy the Enterprise by detonating an experimental terraforming device known as Genesis. (Note: As depicted in Star Trek II: The Wrath of Khan (1982)) The casualties of the fight include Admiral James T. Kirk's Vulcan friend, Spock, whose casket has unexpectedly landed onto the surface of the planet created by the Genesis Device. Upon arriving at Earth Spacedock, Doctor Leonard McCoy begins to act strangely and is arrested. Starfleet Admiral Morrow visits Enterprise and informs the crew the ship is to be decommissioned; the crew is ordered not to speak about Genesis due to political fallout over the device.

David Marcus—Kirk's son, a key scientist in Genesis' development—and the Vulcan Saavik are investigating the Genesis planet from the science vessel USS Grissom. Discovering an unexpected life form on the surface, Marcus and Saavik transport to the planet. They find that the Genesis Device has resurrected Spock in the form of a child, although his mind is not present. Marcus, pressed by Saavik, admits that he used unstable "protomatter" in constructing the Genesis Device, meaning that Spock is rapidly aging, and the planet will be destroyed within hours. Meanwhile, commander Kruge, a member of the alien Klingon race, intercepts information about Genesis. Believing the device to be a potent weapon, he takes his cloaked ship to the Genesis planet, destroys Grissom, and captures Marcus, Saavik, and Spock.

Spock's father, Sarek, meets with Kirk about his son's death. The pair learn that before he died, Spock transferred his katra, or living spirit, to McCoy. Spock's katra and body are needed to lay him to rest on the Vulcan homeworld, and without help, McCoy will die from carrying the katra. Disobeying orders, Kirk and his officers spring McCoy from detention, disable the USS Excelsior, and steal Enterprise from Spacedock to return to the Genesis planet.

In orbit, Enterprise is attacked and disabled by Kruge. In the standoff that follows, Kruge orders that one of the hostages on the surface be executed; David is killed defending Saavik. Kirk and company feign surrender and activate Enterprise's self-destruct sequence. The ship explodes, killing the Klingon boarding party while the Enterprise crew beams down to the planet's surface. Kirk lures Kruge to the planet by promising the secret of Genesis and has him beam his crew to the Klingon vessel. As the Genesis planet disintegrates, Kirk and Kruge engage in hand-to-hand combat; Kirk emerges victorious after kicking the Klingon off a cliff. Overwhelming the last member of the Klingon crew, Kirk and his officers set course for Vulcan.

Spock's katra is reunited with his body in a dangerous procedure called fal tor pan. The ceremony is successful, and Spock is resurrected alive and well, though his memories are fragmented. At Kirk's prompting, Spock remembers he called Kirk "Jim" and recognizes the crew.

== Cast ==
- William Shatner as Admiral James T. Kirk: Shatner stated that being directed by Leonard Nimoy, his longtime co-star and friend, was initially awkward, although as the shoot went on, it became easier as he realized how confident Nimoy was. To reduce weight, Shatner dieted before the start of production, but as filming continued, he tended to "slip"; the costume department had to make 12 shirts for him.
- DeForest Kelley as Leonard McCoy: doctor and the carrier of Spock's living spirit. Kelley has the majority of the film's memorable scenes, but admitted to occasional difficulties in acting with and being directed by his longtime co-star. However, he has declared that he had no doubts about Nimoy's ability to direct the film.
- James Doohan, as Montgomery Scott: Enterprise's chief engineer
- George Takei as Hikaru Sulu: Enterprise's helmsman. Takei was dismayed to hear that his character was called "Tiny" by a guard at McCoy's cell during the film and argued with the film's producer to have the line cut. When Takei saw the first screening of the film, he changed his mind and promptly apologized.
- Walter Koenig, as Pavel Chekov: Enterprise's navigation and acting science officer
- Nichelle Nichols as Uhura: Enterprise's communications officer. Nichols had always insisted on wearing a skirt; although the standard female uniform used trousers, the costume designer created a skirted version specifically for her.
- Dame Judith Anderson as T'Lar: A Vulcan high priestess who restores Spock's katra to his body. At age 87, and, at her nephew's urging, Anderson accepted the role. Nimoy wanted someone with "power and magic" for the ethereal role. Anderson claimed to be 5 feet 2 inches (1.57 m) tall, but her true height was closer to 4 feet 8 inches (1.42 m), which presented a problem when the designers needed to make her look appropriately regal. The solution was to dress her with an overlong hem and built-up shoes which, combined with a crown, added 6 inches (15 cm) to her height.
- Robin Curtis as Saavik: an officer on the starship Grissom. Kirstie Alley, who had played Saavik in The Wrath of Khan, did not return to reprise her role. Curtis had arrived in Los Angeles in 1982; she became friends with the head of Paramount's casting department, who recommended her for the role. Nimoy met with Curtis and gave her the assignment the next day.
- Christopher Lloyd as Kruge: a Klingon interested in securing the powerful secrets of Genesis for use as a weapon. Nimoy said that Lloyd brought a welcome element of theatricality to the role. Nimoy had admired Lloyd's work in One Flew Over the Cuckoo's Nest and Taxi and was impressed by his ability to play powerful villains.
- Mark Lenard plays Sarek, Spock's father and a Vulcan ambassador. Lenard had previously played the role in the Star Trek: The Original Series episode "Journey to Babel" and the Star Trek: The Animated Series episode "Yesteryear".
- Merritt Butrick reprises his role as David Marcus, Kirk's son and a scientist who had helped develop the Genesis Device, from The Wrath of Khan.

Leonard Nimoy, in addition to his directing duties, appears towards the end of the film as Spock, but only appears in the opening credits as the director. Nimoy found that the most difficult scene to direct was one in which Leonard McCoy talks to the unconscious Spock in sickbay, en route to Vulcan. Nimoy recalled that not only was he in the scene, but his eyes are closed, making it difficult to judge the quality of the shot or the actor's performance: "It drove DeForest Kelley crazy. He swears that I was trying to direct him with the movement and flutter of my eyelids." Nimoy was thankful that the story required him to appear in a minimal number of scenes. The rapidly aging Spock, at the ages of 9, 13, 17, and 25, was portrayed successively by Carl Steven, Vadia Potenza, Stephen Manley, and Joe W. Davis. Frank Welker provided Spock's screams, and Steve Blalock doubled for Nimoy, so that a total of seven actors contributed to the role.

Other roles include Robert Hooks as Admiral Morrow, the commander of Starfleet; James B. Sikking as Captain Styles, the commanding officer of the Excelsior; Miguel Ferrer as the Excelsior's first officer; and Phillip R. Allen as Captain J. T. Esteban, the captain of the ill-fated Grissom. John Larroquette plays Maltz, a member of Kruge's bridge crew whom Nimoy describes as "the thoughtful Klingon". Catherine Shirriff plays Valkris, Kruge's doomed lover. Grace Lee Whitney, who played Janice Rand in the original Star Trek series, made a cameo appearance as "Woman in Cafeteria". Scott McGinnis plays a young man whom Uhura forces into a closet at gunpoint.

== Production ==
=== Development ===
Star Trek II: The Wrath of Khan was a critical and commercial success, so Paramount Pictures quickly prepared for a third Star Trek film. The Wrath of Khan's director Nicholas Meyer would not return; he had disagreed with changes made to his film's ending without his consent. Upon seeing The Wrath of Khan, Leonard Nimoy became "excited" about playing Spock again. When asked by Paramount if he wanted to reprise the role for the third feature, Nimoy agreed and told them "You're damned right, I want to direct that picture!" Studio chief Michael Eisner was reluctant to hire Nimoy because he mistakenly believed that the actor hated Star Trek and had demanded in his contract that Spock be killed. Nimoy was given the job after he persuaded Eisner that this was not the case. Star Trek creator Gene Roddenberry's first reaction to the news was that producer Harve Bennett had "hired a director you can't fire".

Paramount gave Bennett the green light to write Star Trek III the day after The Wrath of Khan opened, the fastest go-ahead the producer had received. He began writing the screenplay, noting that "seventeen other people could have written [it]" after the hints at Spock's resurrection in the previous film. Bennett and Nimoy used the open thread of Spock mind melding with McCoy at the end of The Wrath of Khan as a way to explain Spock's restoration. The idea and name of the Vulcan "katra" came from Bennett's discussions with Nimoy. The actor referred the producer to an episode of the television series, "Amok Time", that suggested to Bennett a high level of "spiritual transference" among the Vulcans. Bennett admitted that the idea of Kirk and company going back to the Genesis planet to recover Kirk's "noble self" stemmed from a poem he read in a Star Trek fan magazine. The film's production acknowledged certain expectations from fans—Nimoy remarked that if Spock had not been resurrected and, instead, "Captain Kirk turn[ed] to the camera and [said] 'Sorry, we didn't find him,' people would throw rocks at the screen." A major issue Bennett wrestled with was how to introduce the story for people who had not seen The Wrath of Khan. Bennett said that his television producer mentality "won out"; he added a "previously in Star Trek ..." film device, and had Kirk narrate a captain's log, describing his feelings and sense of loss. Aware of the story's predictability, Bennett decided to have the USS Enterprise destroyed, and intended this plot element be kept a secret.

Nimoy wanted The Search for Spock to be "operatic" in scope; "I wanted the emotions to be very large, very broad, life and death themes [...] and the [look of the film] and everything about it derives everything from sizable characters playing out a large story on a large canvas," he said. In addition, he wanted the characters to have significant scenes, however small, that made them grounded and real. Bennett started writing the script with the ending, where Spock says, "Your name is... Jim", and worked backwards from that point. Elements such as Kruge killing his lover were added to establish context and add drama and intrigue. Originally, the Romulans were the villains, but Nimoy preferred the more "theatrical" Klingons, feeling that their pursuit of Genesis was analogous to the Soviet race for nuclear weaponry. Bennett took the opportunity to flesh out the alien race, who he felt were ill-defined in the television series. The name of the class of the antagonists' ship, Bird of Prey, remained unchanged.

Bennett had originally intended to bring back Dr. Carol Marcus, Bibi Besch's character introduced in The Wrath of Khan. As co-inventor of Project Genesis, as well as Kirk's former love and mother to their son David, the importance of Carol to continuing the story of Genesis initially seemed inherent. "I thought it might be fun to have her relating to David and have something going with Saavik," Bennett would later say. However, as he continued to develop the outline for the story, he found that the character was extraneous. Ultimately, Bennett decided not to include her, primarily for budgetary reasons and because he couldn't reconcile either how Carol wouldn't know of her son's unethical use of unstable protomatter in the Genesis matrix or that she would have condoned it. Nimoy agreed, stating in 1986: "I gave it a lot of thought, but wasn't aware of any obligatory scene in which Carol Marcus would have worked."

Besch had difficulty accepting that she had not been asked to reprise the role. In a letter she wrote to Bennett upon seeing the film, though, she told him she understood why Carol was left out and that she hoped they could use her in the future. The character would conspicuously never be mentioned again in the remaining Original Series films, though she was initially planned to be Kirk's love interest in the film Star Trek Generations. However, Paramount requested that she be replaced with a new character. Carol Marcus would eventually be referenced by Kirk as his pregnant girlfriend in the prequel series Star Trek: Strange New Worlds and as the Genesis device developer by Kathryn Janeway in an episode of Star Trek: Voyager. An alternate timeline version would appear in the film Star Trek Into Darkness, played by Alice Eve. Years after The Search for Spock, Besch would say that she was frustrated and disappointed that she was never able to complete the character's story arc with Kirk, particularly the opportunity to mourn their son's death together.

The script was completed in six weeks. The production's estimated budget of $16 million was slightly larger than that of The Wrath of Khan, but still much less than Star Trek: The Motion Picture (1979). (Note: The Motion Picture's $44 million budget was considered excessive. Part of the blame was laid at Gene Roddenberry's feet; Harve Bennett was made producer of The Wrath of Khan after he promised to make a sequel for much less.) Since elements such as many sets and uniforms had been established, more money was available for special effects. Assistant producer Ralph Winter described the extra money as a "toybox" that allowed more leeway and "fun" in planning the scope of the film.

=== Design ===
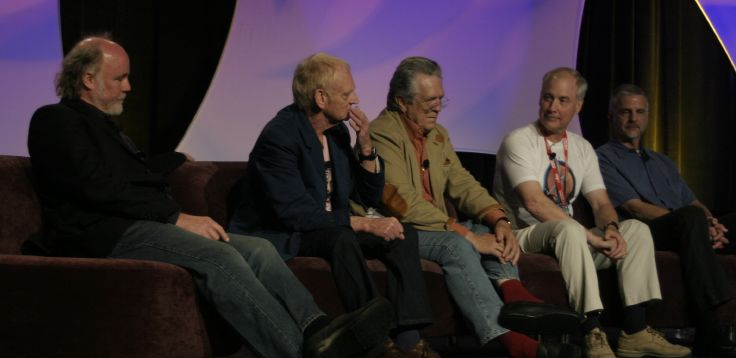
Visual supervisor Ken Ralston (far right) worked with Paramount early in production to develop plans for The Search for Spock's effects.

Nimoy and Bennett worked with effects company Industrial Light & Magic (ILM) to produce special effects, models, and live-action scenes. ILM received a two-page story treatment in November 1982, titled "Return to Genesis". Production supervisor Warren Franklin said that the script they received in early 1983 was "one of the best scripts we read" out of the submissions that arrived weekly. Although ILM had provided the effects work for The Wrath of Khan, they had only been approached after effects storyboards had been completed. For The Search for Spock, ILM were brought in much earlier, meaning that visual effects supervisor Ken Ralston and his team were involved from the planning stages. Nimoy credited this early involvement with increasing the amount of creative input into the film's design and execution.

It became apparent to ILM that The Search for Spock's script required more design and model work than had been necessary for The Wrath of Khan. A merchant ship destroyed by Kruge early in the film was a kitbash—a design made of combined model pieces. Effects cameraman Don Dow reasoned that since the ship was destroyed so quickly it did not make sense to spend a large amount of time building it. The USS Grissom was named for astronaut Virgil "Gus" Grissom; the same model would be used to depict other science vessels in the television series Star Trek: The Next Generation.

The Excelsior was a new design that ILM felt was a better rendition of a Federation starship—sleeker and more modern than the Enterprise. The art department created concept sketches to show to Paramount, and at an art director's urging model maker Bill George submitted another design, based on what he thought the Enterprise would look like if designed by the Japanese. Nimoy picked George's angular and simplified take for production. While in the film, the Excelsior is supposed to be larger than its predecessor, the physical model was 12 inches (30 cm) smaller than the Enterprise.

The Earth Spacedock was a design intended to expand the scope of Star Trek. After approving a small three-dimensional maquette of the final design, the effects team created an exterior Spacedock model measuring 6 feet (1.8 m) tall. Rather than painstakingly wiring thousands of small lights, ILM made the model out of clear Plexiglass and painted it; scratching off the finish created windows, and an inner core of neon lights illuminated the resulting holes. The inside of the dock was simulated by an additional model, 20 feet (6.1 m) long, with a removable center section. The interior illumination was generated by outside fiber optics and 2,000- to 5,000-watt lights.

The Klingon Bird of Prey, its wings downstretched in an attack posture. George based the humps on the top of the ship on a football player's shoulder pads, while the red feather design on the ship's underside was a remnant of its planned Romulan origins.

Art directors Nilo Rodis and Dave Carson designed the Klingon Bird of Prey, while George constructed the model. Nimoy wanted the ship to be reminiscent of an attacking bird, with movable wings that changed depending on whether the ship was in a cruising or attack posture. George took design cues from sketches of bodybuilders and football players, incorporating the starship equivalents of down-stretched, threatening arms and muscular shoulders, together with what looked like shoulder pads and a chin guard on the ship's outstretched neck. Although the stolen Romulan ship thread was cut from the film, the Bird of Prey design had incorporated elements of Romulan design. "It has some of the basic bird shape, but it's more ominous", Ralston said. A graphic bird design was integrated into the ship's underside.

To save money, many sets, particularly interiors, were redresses of existing sets. The Enterprise bridge was reconfigured to stand in for the Grissom, with the chairs reupholstered and the central navigation console rotated to modify the floor plan. An Earth bar and the Klingon medical bay were redresses of the Enterprise sickbay. Nimoy even appropriated the Klingon bridge set from another production. Many blinking consoles were rented from a props company rather than being fabricated. The Enterprise bridge itself remained largely unchanged from the previous film, notably its black floor was repainted gray for photogenic reasons. The most drastic change was made to Spock's quarters. Nimoy had felt the previous gray color scheme did not express a Vulcan style, and had it brightened with yellows and oranges.

Adding local color to the Klingon bridge was a ragged doglike creature the effects team derisively called "Fifi Rebozo". Ken Ralston thought that giving the Klingon captain a pet would add atmosphere, and sculpted a reptilian dog worked into the script as Kruge's mascot. The animal's hair was made from cheap wig clippings, with creature supervisor David Sosalla spraying the material with adhesive and laid clumps of the distressed fur onto the painted puppet body to make the animal appear "beat-up and moth-eaten". During filming, Sosalla and crew sprinkled the creature with water to make it look more unpleasant. Ralston hid inside Kruge's command chair and puppeteered the animal's head and body through an opening on the creature's side; the creature's head was large enough for Ralston to fit his hand inside the spring-loaded jaw to operate it. Three helpers operated cables that opened the animal's eyes and made it snarl. The crew decided against some of the intended creature movements, such as not moving its ears because it made the supposedly repulsive creature "cute". For the animal's demise during the Klingons' fight with the Enterprise, an additional "dead" puppet was created, but Ralston used the "live" one for the scene instead.

Many of the props in The Wrath of Khan had been reused from The Motion Picture, or scrounged from other productions, but for The Search for Spock Winter wanted to design uniquely Star Trek items. George and artist Phil Norwood collaborated on many of the prop designs, creating updated and sleeker versions of the original series communicators and phasers. Many props were created out of wood and embellished with small pieces from model kits. While the Federation tricorder was created using a model race car body, the Klingon props were intended to look dirtier, with sharp surfaces that looked uncomfortable to carry. George was insistent on using the shapes and materials, rather than blinking lights, to suggest the props were real and manufactured.

=== Costumes and makeup ===
Robert Fletcher, costume designer for the previous Star Trek films, was responsible for The Search for Spock's wardrobe. Fletcher's job was to sketch outfits, choose the necessary fabrics, and complete the fittings for principal characters. He collaborated with costumer Jim Linn, who clothed extras and managed the logistics of cleaning, repairing, and tracking costumes. Most of the Starfleet uniforms had already been designed for the previous film, but Fletcher wanted to dress the main characters in civilian clothes. Fletcher developed a mythology behind each outfit; the stone ornaments on Sarek's robe, for instance, were intended to be representative of a Vulcan's level of consciousness. The costumer had the advantage of access to Paramount's store rooms, which contained literal tons of expensive fabrics.

The designer and production staff were satisfied with the Klingon costume designs inspired by feudal Japanese dress, made by Fletcher for The Motion Picture, but they had to make new versions; of 12 original costumes, half had been destroyed during publicity tours. The remaining six were loaned out for an episode of Mork & Mindy and badly damaged; Fletcher spent three months salvaging what remained. Additions to established clothing included an officer's vest for Kruge, and jewelry.

In addition to his costume chores, Fletcher designed the Klingon and Vulcan makeup. Makeup artist Thomas R. Burman suggested that Fletcher was asked to help because the studio neglected to contract the work out; Burman received a contract only three weeks before the start of photography. Burman's bid of $160,000 was much higher than Paramount's $50,000 budget, but he secured the job when his competitor dropped out close to the start of production. "It didn't come down to money in the end but to who could do it quickly [...] we had a [reputation] for working fast and doing quality work," Burman explained. Fletcher and Burman agreed that the cragged foreheads of the Klingons in The Motion Picture were too prominent, obscuring the individuals' faces. "It was just too cartoonish, and I didn't want a Star Wars look in [the] movie. There had never been a good marriage between the forehead appliance and the actor's faces. We tried to keep them in character rather than have these obtrusive things on their heads," Burman said. The resulting Klingon makeup took two hours to apply.

=== Filming ===
To guard against leaks that had prefigured Spock's death during production of The Wrath of Khan, (Note: In early drafts of The Wrath of Khan's script, Spock's death was intended to be a shocking twist in the first third of the film (à la Alfred Hitchcock's Psycho), but leaked word resulted in an angry fan letter-writing campaign. With the element of surprise gone the script underwent a major rewrite and Spock's death became the climax.) Paramount took precautions to secure the sets. Set designer Cameron Birnie noted that the production's security was highly unusual; sets were built out of sequence and the crew given only as many pages as they needed to fabricate each locale. Security guards checked the picture identification cards of production staff. Any mention of the production was removed from stationery and documents, and "Trois" (three, in French) was written as a code word. Offices and workshops were bereft of identifying signage, with doors double-locked for extra protection. The Search for Spock's scripts were chemically treated so that copies could be traced to the original; as a further canary trap, subtle changes in wording distinguished each copy. Nimoy's name never appeared on call sheets, and Spock was referred to in the script as "Nacluv" (Vulcan spelled backwards). Despite the precautions, word of the Enterprise's destruction leaked out before the film's release. (Note: Roddenberry, who had been forced out of direct creative control during production of the previous film, felt that the destruction of the vessel he had helped to create was something of a betrayal. Many attributed the leak and the acrimony that followed to Roddenberry himself; Bennett found via his canary trap that a leaked copy he obtained from a fan had indeed come from Roddenberry's original, although since Roddenberry had violated neither the law nor his contract there was nothing that could be done about it. Regardless, the vessel's destruction was clearly shown in a television spot that aired two weeks before the film's release; Bennett tried to have the Paramount-approved commercial changed, but lost out.)

Principal photography commenced on August 15, 1983. All but two days of production were filmed on Paramount soundstages, by cinematographer Charles Correll. The Search for Spock was one of the first major feature films to use Eastman 5294, a color high speed negative film stock. The film allowed Correll latitude in choosing a broad range of exposure indexes. Since The Search for Spock was shot with anamorphic lenses and many theatergoers would see widescreen 70 mm prints, Correll needed to produce a crisp depth of field, a difficult task on many sets. For scenes on the bridge, Correll pushed the exposure index above the Eastman recommendation to keep the image crisp at less than 50 foot-candles.

Many of The Search for Spock's dialogue sequences feature tight close-up shots. During Kirk and Sarek's mind meld, Nimoy chose cuts that focused on accentuating the dialogue; "Instead of watching people's faces, all you see is the mouth or the eyes and you have the tendency to hear better," Correll explained. Correll was unhappy that every scene save one was filmed on a soundstage. Feeling that recreating everything on set resulted in a fake look, the cinematographer suggested that Genesis be filmed on Kauai in Hawaii, and that Red Rock Canyon stand in for Vulcan. The production did not have the money to shoot on location, meaning that Nimoy was preoccupied with making sure the various outdoor settings felt believable. While the various vessel exteriors were handled by ILM, Correll was responsible for the look of the interior sets. He preferred to treat these as actual locations inside the ships; although the sets' ceilings were designed to be removed so that lights could be rigged in the rafters, Correll used other lighting methods. In the Bird of Prey, he used fluorescent tubes to pick up the walls' metallic paints and kept the set smoky to convey a dirty atmosphere.

Before McCoy is arrested by security, he attempts to charter a spaceflight to Genesis in a bar. The scene opens with two officers playing a World War I-era dogfight video game. The wireframe biplanes were created using black lines on clear paper printouts placed on an overlay cell. "It was really just a gag shot", effects artist Charlie Mullen explained, "the idea that people in the future would be playing an old war game." To accommodate the effect, Correll had to use a large amount of exposure without making the bar appear overlit. Much of the lighting was provided by tables rigged with fluorescent tubes to provide an effect different from other parts of the film. Correll could not add smoke to the scene to enhance the bar "feel", because the disturbed atmosphere would have made ILM's game hard to insert. The scene was intended to end in a barroom brawl when security tried to take McCoy into custody; Nimoy decided that "it didn't feel right" and there was not enough time or money to achieve the scene successfully.

The Genesis planet was produced via matte paintings and soundstages on Paramount lots under art director John Edward Chilberg II. Much of the planet occupied Stage 15, known as the DeMille stage in honor of the director's Parting of the Red Sea on the stage during filming of The Ten Commandments (1956). The space measured 300 by 100 feet (91 by 30 m). The perceived boundaries of the scenes were extended via matte paintings created by Chris Evans, Frank Ordaz, and Michael Pangrazio. Because parts of the set had to literally collapse during the planet's destruction, the set was built 16 feet (4.9 m) off the ground and featured trapdoors and pyrotechnics in the floor. The hundreds of 10,000-watt lights in the rafters were covered in silk for day scenes to soften the light and fitted with blue filters for night; dimmers eased the transition between periods. Since the doomed planet was no longer a paradise, the art director, Nimoy, Bennett and Correll considered constant changes to the colors on the scenes, but decided not to get "fancy photographically". While many of the scenes appeared lit with minimal light sources such as flickering fires, Correll tried to use as much light as possible. To get the fire to reflect on the actor's faces, Correll used a variety of tricks with normal lights; using natural fire would not have provided the required intensity.

Kruge (left) wrestles with rapidly evolving worms. The slimy nature of the creature and the practicalities of Kruge's Klingon makeup meant the effect had to be shot in real time, with invisible wires pulled by off-screen crew giving the creature life.

A significant feature of the Genesis planet are the alien worms that rapidly evolve from microbes on Spock's coffin. The creatures start as small, slimy crawlers, then grow to lengths of 8 feet (2.4 m). The small worms were created by injecting molten "Hot-Melt" vinyl into epoxy polymer molds that were immediately put into cold water to create a translucent product. The resulting hundred or so creatures were painted and coated with methacyl, a slippery, slimy coating. Each worm was attached to an elevated platform by a piece of fishing line; the lines were tied to rods underneath the set. Offscreen helpers pushed the rods or pulled fishing line to create motion; the scene required many takes because the fishing line would periodically flash at the camera. The larger worms proved more problematic, with filming taking place at ILM and Paramount Stage 15. Similar to The Wrath of Khan's parasitic Ceti eels, the worms featured cobra-like cowls and a ringed mouth of teeth. ILM built one of the worms with more articulation than the others; Ralston operated the creature through a hole in the set floor with his hand stuck inside the creature. The other worms were animated using pneumatic bladders that caused air to pass through hoses in sequence, creating an undulating motion. During the scene, the worms attack Kruge, who kills one of them. The usual method for achieving the effect of the creature wrapping itself around Kruge would have been to film the sequence in reverse, but this posed problems: the slime coating Kruge would have been out of place with reverse filming, and multiple takes would ruin the Klingon makeup Lloyd wore. ILM's solution involved rigging the worm with fishing lines that were pulled in a choreographed fashion by multiple off-screen helpers to simulate the wrapping movement. When small pieces of the Klingon uniforms caught or snapped the fishing lines, Ralston resorted to steel cables.

The fiery breakup of the Genesis planet involved fire, smoke, and earth upheaval. "The main part of the floor was rigged so that rocks would shoot up out of the ground [on catapults]. Trees were rigged to fall and start fires," Correll explained. Producing the shots required meticulous direction and between 20 and 30 helpers were on hand the day of shooting. Correll shot simultaneously on nine cameras; the hope was to get as many usable shots as possible in one take, in case all the trapdoors and pyrotechnics had to be reset for another round of filming. This entire sequence was completed in three weeks.

The Vulcan stairs were filmed at Occidental College—the production's only location shooting. To create the orange atmosphere, Correll used a large 15-by-15-foot (4.6 by 4.6 m) floodlight, created for the 1983 Peter Hyams film The Star Chamber, placed on the top of a 110-foot (34 m) crane. The location's blue-gray sky was replaced with a matte painting that covered the top half of the stairs shot. Many ornamental touches Nimoy wanted for the procession scene ultimately never materialized. The background of the set was simply a painted piece of canvas; Nimoy had the background out of focus in all the shots as a way to hide the shortcomings of the scenery. Elements removed from the Vulcan sequence included a procession through the "Vulcan Hall of Ancient Thought", a space dominated by large heads atop columns and a sculpture towering to a height of 20 feet (6.1 m). The scene was cut because the procession dragged on for too long.

Production on the film was temporarily shut down after a fire destroyed several soundstages at Paramount Studios, one of which was adjacent to the set for the Genesis planet. Initially, the set's pyrotechnics were suspected of causing the fire, but the cause was ruled to be arson. Shatner was among the cast members who grabbed fire hoses to stop the flames. Correll hoped the place would burn down so that he would get his chance to film in Hawaii. While most of the set was undamaged, holes in the side of the building had to be covered with heavy black curtains to prevent outside light from leaking in.

=== Visual effects ===
As with previous Star Trek films, time and money were major constraints for visual effects. The effects artists were concerned about producing the right look no matter the time involved. While effects cameraman Scott Farrar and his assistants constantly traversed the 400 miles (640 km) separating ILM from Paramount, teams at the effects house organized post-production effects and photography. The constant travel took a toll on Ralston, who began to forget which airlines he was taking and what city he was in. As a pause in work meant wasted time, effects editors Bill Kimberlin and Jay Ignaszewski produced usable effects shots for the live-action editors at Paramount; these half-finished, monochromatic composites gave the editors an idea of scene pacing. ILM contributed 120 shots to the film. Like Correll, Ralston used Eastman 94 for all shots that did not require bluescreen.

ILM filmed starships using motion control for timed and computer-assisted model movement. The ship models required multiple camera passes because different parts of the ship and its lights were filmed at different exposure levels. The Excelsior required eight passes to supplement the main "beauty pass", the Enterprise six. ILM could have combined passes with multiple exposures, but not without risk; "If anything got out of synch, or somehow we dropped a frame, we would have to reshoot—and then you're stuck. You've ruined two pieces, two elements," Farrar said.

The Klingon Bird of Prey's cloaking device required a new effect. The original concept featured the layers of the ship forming up from the inside out, requiring a series of overlaid elements filmed with an Oxberry animation camera. ILM decided the effect appeared too "animated-looking", and defied common sense: "if there was a fanfare to decloaking, everyone would know the Klingons were coming and blow them out of the sky before they could even finish materializing," Ralston said. The supervisor decided on subtlety, throwing color separations out of sync to create a blurry ripple effect. While simple, the sequence was more effective than the elaborate planned scene. Effects such as the destruction of the merchant ship were created using projected explosions, a technique perfected during the production of Return of the Jedi. Simulated zero-gravity explosions were filmed and reflected onto a card using the same motion control program used for the models. The result was an explosion that moved with the model.

The most laborious effects sequences took place inside Spacedock; months were spent completing the station's interior shots. The effects crew tested different looks to make sure the dock interior seemed appropriately vast. "We found the interior demanded some degree of atmospheric haze, even though there probably wouldn't be any in space," Farrar said. To create a slightly degraded look, the crew used blue color gels for lights and shot through smoke for fill shots. They switched to diffusion filters for light passes, as using smoke for longer shots would have required time-consuming smoke level monitoring. Due to difference in the scales of the dock and ship models, it was impossible to film the Excelsior and Enterprise inside the set. Opening the dock's space doors was problematic because the lights illuminating the inside of the dock from the exterior had to be hidden from the camera to prevent lens flares. Massive fans were used to keep equipment cool and prevent the lights from melting or warping the dock's interior artwork. The realism of the dock scenes was heightened by live-action footage of a cafeteria, with windows overlooking the dock interior. The cafeteria was a set built at ILM and filled with 40 extras in front of a bluescreen so that the dock and Enterprise could be composited in later; matte paintings extended the ceiling of the set.

The Enterprise destruction sequence combined footage culled from multiple models, since destroying the original would have been very costly.

Ralston, who considered the Enterprise ugly and the model hard to shoot, delighted in destroying the ship. Several shots were combined for the complete destruction sequence; while Ralston would have preferred to take a mallet to the original $150,000 model, a variety of cheaper models were used. The first part of the ship to be destroyed was the bridge, a separate miniature with stars added to the background. The shot switches to the Bird of Prey moving away as the top of the saucer burns, where explosions (filmed upside down to simulate the absence of gravity) were superimposed over a motion control pass of the ship. The camera cuts to a closeup of the ship's registration number being eaten away by inner explosions. George created a light Styrofoam model that was dissolved by acetone dripped on the saucer from above. By shooting at less than one frame per second and keeping light off the model, the drips were not visible in the print. Burning steel wool on the inside of the saucer created a glowing ember effect from the ship's inner decks being destroyed. The saucer explosion was simulated by blowing up a talcum powder-covered plaster dish. Two- and four-ounce bombs and gasoline were used as pyrotechnics in live action scenes of the bridge being destroyed. Stuntmen used spring-loaded platforms to launch themselves in the air.

For the final destruction of the Genesis planet, footage from the Paramount set had to be carefully matched with ILM visual effects footage. ILM built scale miniatures cut into sections to portray parts of Genesis's upheaval (rock slides, fissures opening in the ground) that live-action scenes could not easily replicate. One of the largest miniatures, measuring 20 by 16 feet (6.1 by 4.9 m), had trick trees and trapdoors that could be reset, propane jets for gusts of fire, and solenoid-triggered rockfalls. For scenes where Kirk and Kruge battle at a precipice over a pit of lava, the shot combined animated lava, clouds (really cotton daubs on black), lightning, and a matte painting. Overhead shots of the lava were created by lighting a piece of clear Plexiglass with colored gels and covering the plate with methacyl, vermiculite and charcoal; the mixture dripped off the surface and coated the crew underneath. ILM simulated Kruge's demise, a long plunge into the pool of lava, with the help of a stop-motion puppet. Lloyd fell a few feet onto a black mattress; during a lightning flash the actor was replaced by the puppet that fell the rest of the distance. Because the shot was filmed on black instead of the traditional bluescreen, the animators had to remove or rotoscope the black background around Lloyd one frame at a time. The transition between the footage of Lloyd and the puppet was hidden by a single-frame flash as a bolt of lightning struck Kruge. The scene of Kirk and Spock beaming away as the ground collapses was another created at ILM, as the level of destruction was simply not possible for the live-action crew.

Among the other visual effects ILM had to produce were the transporter beam and the warp speed effect. Mullen noted that the effects' look changed depending on who was directing the film, with a tension between producing something new and not alienating the fans used to the established style. The effect was produced by cutting out or rotomatting the individual to be transported, then making a vertical slot through which a high-intensity light was positioned. A computer-controlled move would cause the light to spread from the center and fade away, then reset its position and repeat the movement on the opposite side. Handmade acetate filters and gels were applied to give the transporter beam color and patterns, followed by small flickering animated highlights called "bugs" which appeared after the character had dematerialized. The Klingons' transporters were given a harsh red look to differentiate them from the smooth blue Federation effect. Whereas many of the multicolored rainbow warp trail shots from The Wrath of Khan were stock footage taken from the first film, the producers of the third film wanted something new. A streak effect, in which a beauty pass of the ship was combined with blurred passes for each light intensity, was tried first. The result was disappointing as the streaks became distorted and out of place when Enterprise grew larger. Mullen rejected a straight animation of the warp drive as too bouncy, but the footage was cut in for editing while ILM went through six more approaches to the problem. The final effect, a "vaporous, colorful trail", came together only weeks before the film's release.

=== Music ===
Composer James Horner returned to score The Search for Spock, fulfilling a promise he had made to Bennett on The Wrath of Khan. While Nimoy considered hiring his friend Leonard Rosenman for the score, he was persuaded that Horner's return would grant continuity between The Wrath of Khan and the new film. Much like the content of the film, Horner's music was a direct continuation of the score he wrote for the previous film. When writing music for The Wrath of Khan, Horner was aware he would reuse certain cues for an impending sequel; two major themes he reworked were for Genesis and Spock. While the Genesis theme supplants the title music Horner wrote for The Wrath of Khan, the end credits were quoted "almost verbatim".

In hours-long discussions with Bennett and Nimoy, Horner agreed with the director that the "romantic and more sensitive" cues were more important than the "bombastic" ones. Horner had written Spock's theme to give the character more dimension: "By putting a theme over Spock, it warms him and he becomes three-dimensional rather than a collection of schticks," he said. The theme was expanded in The Search for Spock to represent the ancient alien mysticism and culture of Spock and Vulcan.

Among the new cues Horner wrote was a "percussive and atonal" theme for the Klingons which is represented heavily in the film. Music author Jeff Bond described the cue as a compromise between music from Horner's earlier film Wolfen, Khan's motif from The Wrath of Khan, and Jerry Goldsmith's Klingon music from The Motion Picture. Horner also adapted music from Sergei Prokofiev's Romeo and Juliet for part of the Enterprise theft sequence and its destruction, while the scoring to Spock's resurrection on Vulcan was lifted from Horner's Brainstorm ending.

== Themes ==
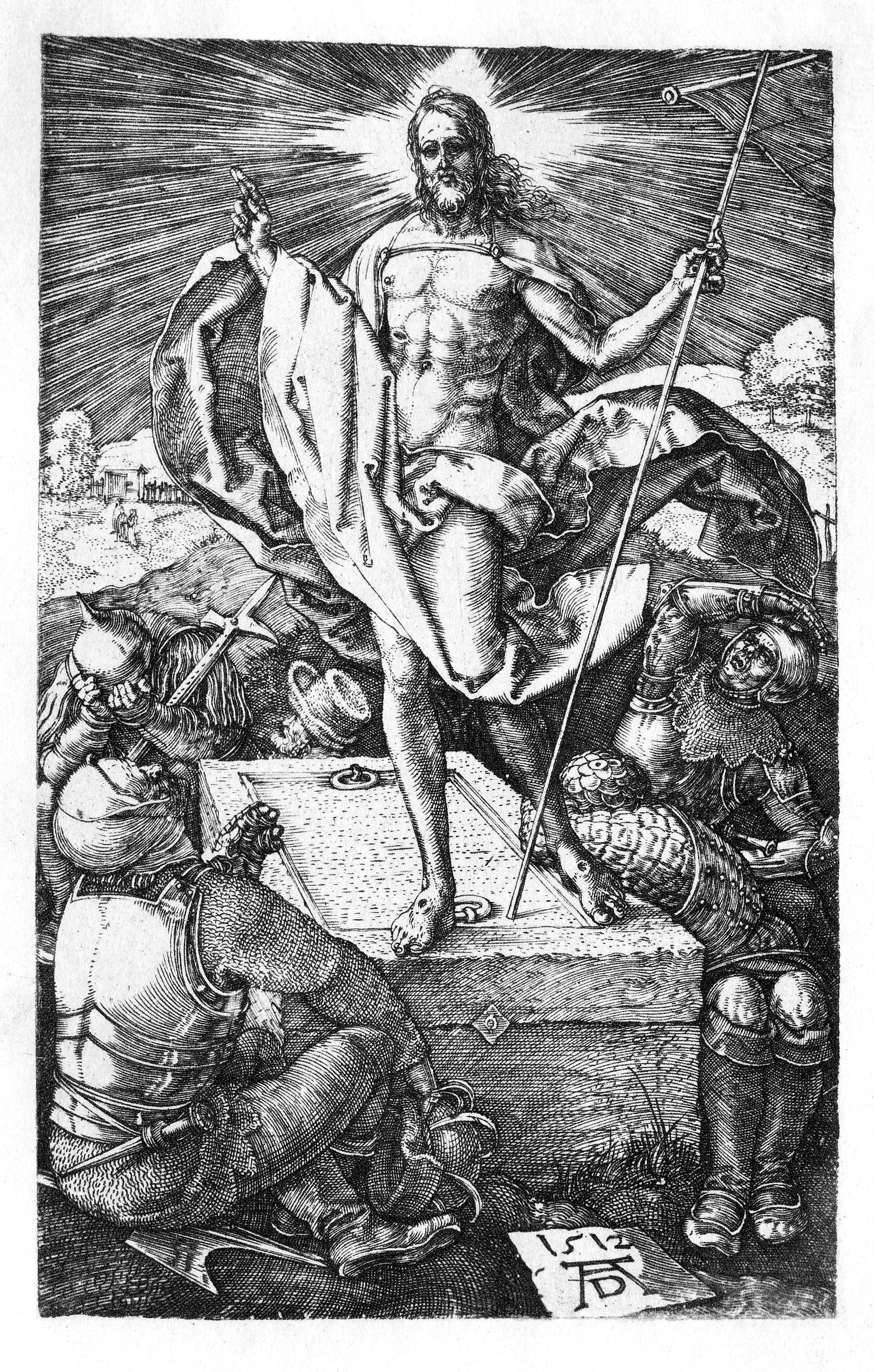
The Search for Spock continues The Wrath of Khan's exploration of Christian biblical themes of life, death, and rebirth.

Nimoy wrote that The Search for Spock's major theme is that of friendship. "What should a person do to help a friend? How deeply should a friendship commitment go? ... And what sacrifices, what obstacles, will these people endure? That's the emotion line of the film [and] its reason for existence," he recalled. While Spock's bodily resurrection was complete, his mind was a blank slate—The Search for Spock, Michele and Duncan Barrett argue, says that the important question is whether an individual's mind functions, as this is the key to a meaningful existence.

Brown University professor Ross S. Kraemer argues that The Search for Spock "became Star Trek's first and most obvious exploration of Christian themes of sacrificial, salvific death and resurrection". According to Larry J. Kreitzer, The Wrath of Khan provided "its own versions of Good Friday and a hint of the Easter Sunday to come", with the hints fulfilled by Spock's bodily restoration in The Search for Spock. David and Saavik's discovery of Spock's empty coffin and burial robes parallels the evidence the Apostles found that pointed to Jesus' resurrection in the Gospel of Luke, asserts Kraemer. Spock's resurrection not only proves the Vulcan's belief in the existence of the katra, but also affirms these are not just a belief system but a certainty. Barrett points to the Star Trek feature films in general and The Search for Spock in particular as a turn away from the irreligious television series. In more practical terms, Jeffery A. Smith pointed to The Search for Spock as one of many Hollywood films culminating in a 1990s trend where death has little permanence (Ghost, Defending Your Life, What Dreams May Come, Meet Joe Black).

The Genesis planet became a doomed experiment partly for dramatic reasons; having a time limit for the characters to save Spock added tension. Nimoy was also interested in scientific ethics—how quickly can science move and what are the dangers of that movement. University of Houston professor John Hansen notes that while Spock's sacrifice in The Wrath of Khan is the "archetype of reason and rationality manifesting the archetype of human virtue", a selfless and freely-made choice, the death of Valkris (who has learned too much about the Genesis Device) in The Search for Spock is far different: the Klingon willingly accepts her death for the "common good" as determined by the state, relinquishing her liberty and life. Hansen contends that the issues of personal liberty and the exploitation of technology, in this case Genesis, are "intertwined". The Genesis Device was intended as a liberating technology, creating life from lifelessness, but in the Klingon view it is a tool for dominion (contrasting the contemporary views of how technology can promote or constrain liberty).

== Release ==
The Search for Spock was not heavily marketed. Among the promotional merchandise created for the film's release were Search for Spock–branded calendars and glasses sold at Taco Bell. A novelization (ISBN 0-671-49500-3) was also released, and reached second place on The New York Times paperback bestsellers list. President Ronald Reagan screened the film for friends during a weekend away from the White House in 1984, spent with White House staff chief Mike Deaver and the president's own close friend Senator Paul Laxalt. Reagan wrote of the film: "It wasn't too good."

The Search for Spock opened June 1 in a record-breaking 1,996 theaters across North America; with competing films Indiana Jones and the Temple of Doom, Gremlins, Ghostbusters and Top Secret! released at the same time, more than half of the nation's screens were filled by summer blockbusters. The Search for Spock grossed over $16 million in its opening weekend. In its second weekend the film's gross dropped 42 percent. The box office strength of The Search for Spock and Indiana Jones led Paramount to dominate early summer film business. The film made $76.5 million in North America, for a total of $87 million worldwide.

James Horner's soundtrack to the film was released on a 43-minute LP record by Capitol Records in 1984, and also contained a 12" single titled "The Search for Spock", composed by Horner and performed by Group 87, a band featuring composer Mark Isham and Missing Persons drummer Terry Bozzio. It was re-released on compact disc in 1989 by GNP Crescendo. Film Score Monthly released an expanded two-compact disc score June 1, 2010. The Expanded Edition included both the original Capitol Records release from 1984 and an all-new version which featured the complete soundtrack as heard in the film, including alternate versions as well as many cues heard for the first time outside of the film.

=== Critical response ===
The Search for Spock received generally positive reviews from critics. Richard Schickel of Time praised the film as "perhaps the first space opera to deserve that term in its grandest sense". Janet Maslin of The New York Times and Newsweek wrote that while the film felt weighed down by the increasingly aged actors and television tropes, it was leavened by its dedication. Roger Ebert called the film "good, but not great" and a compromise between the special effects-dependent The Motion Picture and the character-driven The Wrath of Khan. Conversely, USA Today praised the film as the best of the three and the closest to the original spirit of the television series. An overwhelmingly negative view of the film was offered by The Globe and Mail's Susan Ferrier Mackay, who summed the film up as "ba-a-a-d". In a 2010 retrospective of the film franchise, author Jill Sherwin suggests the aging Enterprise served as a metaphor for the aging Star Trek franchise. On Metacritic the film has a score of 56 out of 100 based on reviews from 17 critics, indicating "mixed or average" reviews. On Rotten Tomatoes it has an approval rating of 78% based on reviews from 49 critics.

Critics praised Nimoy's direction, to which USA Today attributed the film's success in capturing the essence of the television show. Newsweek wrote that due to Nimoy the film was the best-paced Trek film, and that his familiarity with these actors enabled him to bring out the best from them. Newsweek, and David Sterritt of the Christian Science Monitor, appreciated how the film slowed the action down to allow moments of reflection, comparing this with the focus of most contemporary action films on effects rather than actors. The Washington Post's Rita Kempley wrote that Nimoy's direction was competent, but his background in television showed—"the film feels made-for-TV", she summarized. Fellow Post critic Gary Arnold concurred with Kempley's television film assessment, but also wrote that Nimoy was smart to focus on the essentials of each scene; he "[concentrates] on the actors in ways that flatter and enhance their work."

The Search for Spock's plot often received negative reviews. Schickel called the film "overplotted" and filled with "heavy expository burdens", comparing it to real opera. Sterritt said that the script occasionally veered in "arbitrary" directions and contained missteps, such as how the Grissom and its crew are suddenly lost, but the plot disregards their fate. Arnold wrote that Shatner missed an opportunity to act on par with The Wrath of Khan's revelation that Kirk was David's father. The critic considered David's death an attempt at a similar shock, but felt it was not a success. Harry M. Geduld, writing for The Humanist, criticized the film for what he called "contradictions and implausibilities", such as Scott's sabotage of the Excelsior and Spock's regeneration. Pauline Kael wrote that "this new film seems to take a churlish attitude toward its light-hearted, delicately self-mocking predecessor: almost vindictively, the new film requires that Genesis disintegrate."

The film's sense of self-seriousness and the camaraderie amongst the characters were generally cited as positive aspects. Maslin wrote that certain tacky elements of the film's television roots were outweighed by the closeness of the Enterprise crew and "by their seriousness and avidity about what seem to be the silliest minutiae [...] That's what longtime Trekkies love about the series, and it's still here—a little the worse for wear, but mostly untarnished." The Los Angeles Times wrote that despite its spectacle, the film's "humanity once again outweighs the hardware, and its innocence is downright endearing". Mackay offered an alternate view, calling the characters' actions and dialogue "wooden" and saying that the film's monsters had more life than the acting. Lloyd's portrayal of Kruge received praise from New York's David Denby and The Daily News's Hunter Reigler.

The film's effects were conflictingly appraised. Schickel wrote that the effects were "technically adroit" and occasionally "witty", and Ebert singled out the Bird of Prey as a "great-looking" ship. Sterritt felt that the settings always felt like they were on soundstages rather than out in space, and Denby wrote that more could have been done with Genesis, and that while it was an interesting concept its special effects execution was lacking. Kempley appreciated the sets' low values, writing that "the fakier the sets", the closer the film felt to its television origins.

John Nubbin reviewed Star Trek III: The Search for Spock for Different Worlds magazine and stated that "The Search for Spock is only a long TV episode. At $4 to $5 a pop, even the fans may grow weary of such productions. This is not to say that the Trek phenomenon is over, or even dying."

=== Home media ===
The Search for Spock was released on home video in the United States in February 1985. The initial retail offerings included VHS, Betamax, LaserDisc and CED formats with closed captioning. As part of a plan to support its push of 8mm video cassette, Sony partnered with Paramount Home Video to bring titles like The Search for Spock to the platform in 1986.

The film was given a "bare bones" DVD release on May 11, 2000, with no extra features—the release was several months earlier than the release of The Wrath of Khan. Two years later, a two-disc "Collector's Edition" was released with supplemental material and the same video transfer as the original DVD release. It featured a text commentary by Michael Okuda and audio commentary from Nimoy, Bennett, Correll, and Curtis.

The film was released on high-definition Blu-ray Disc in May 2009 to coincide with the new Star Trek feature, along with the other five films featuring the original crew in Star Trek: Original Motion Picture Collection. The Search for Spock was remastered in 1080p high-definition from the 2000 DVD transfer. All six films in the set have new 7.1 Dolby TrueHD audio. The disc features a new commentary track by former Star Trek: The Next Generation, Deep Space Nine, and Voyager television writers Ronald D. Moore and Michael Taylor.

On July 7, 2021, it was announced that the first four films in the Star Trek franchise were to be remastered from original elements and would be released on 4K Ultra HD Blu-ray on September 7 to commemorate the franchise's 55th anniversary, alongside individual Blu-rays of the same films.

The film was briefly removed from Netflix in July 2013 because of missing English subtitles for the Klingon and Vulcan dialogue.

== See also ==
- List of Star Trek films
- List of films featuring extraterrestrials
- List of films featuring space stations
