= Strange Tales (digest magazine) =

Strange Tales was a British digest magazine that produced two issues in 1946. It was published by Utopian Publications of London, and edited by Walter Gillings, who was not credited. Technically these were anthologies, not magazines: Postwar paper shortages meant that new magazines could only be launched after an application process that did not apply to anthologies, so the publisher treated them as anthologies. Its writers included Jack Williamson, Robert Bloch, and Ray Bradbury. The issues, which were not dated, appeared in February and March 1946. They were both 64 pages long; the first was priced at 1/-; the second at 9d.
