= Alaska–Yukon–Pacific Exposition =

1909 exposition in Seattle, Washington

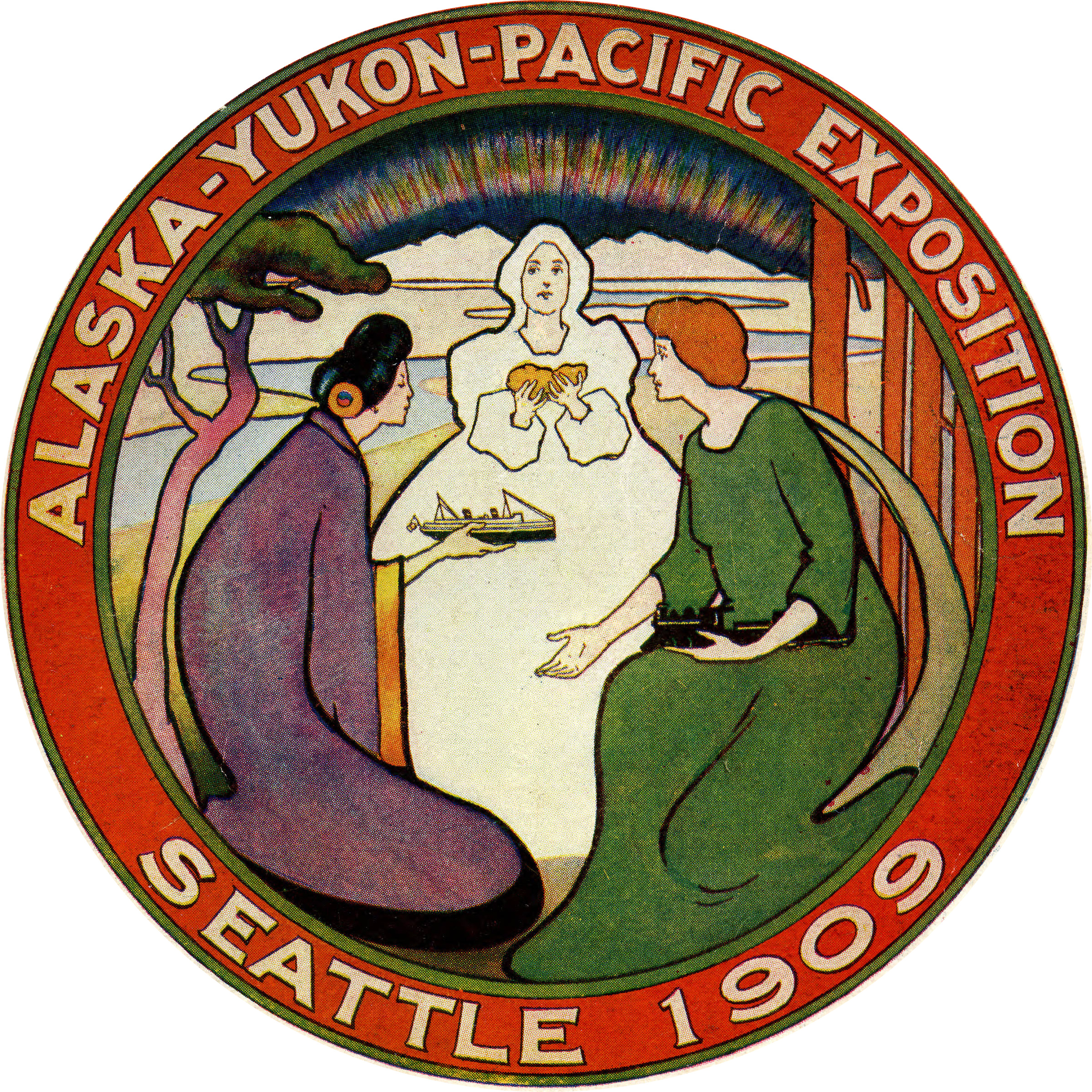
- Exposition logo

Overview
- BIE-class: Unrecognized exposition
- Name: Alaska–Yukon–Pacific Exposition
- Visitors: over 3,700,000

Location
- City: Seattle
- Coordinates: 47°39′14″N 122°18′28″W

Timeline
- Opening: June 1, 1909
- Closure: October 16, 1909

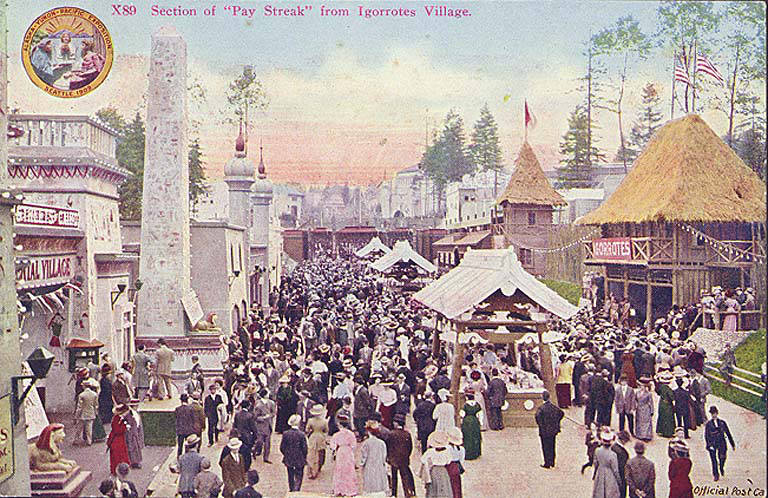
Postcard of the "Pay Streak"

Exposition flag

The Alaska–Yukon–Pacific Exposition, acronym AYP or AYPE, was a world's fair held in Seattle in 1909 publicizing the development of the Pacific Northwest. It was originally planned for 1907 to mark the 10th anniversary of the Alaska Gold Rush, but the organizers learned of the Jamestown Exposition being held that same year and rescheduled.

The fairgrounds were hosted on an undeveloped portion of the present day campus of the University of Washington.

== Planning ==
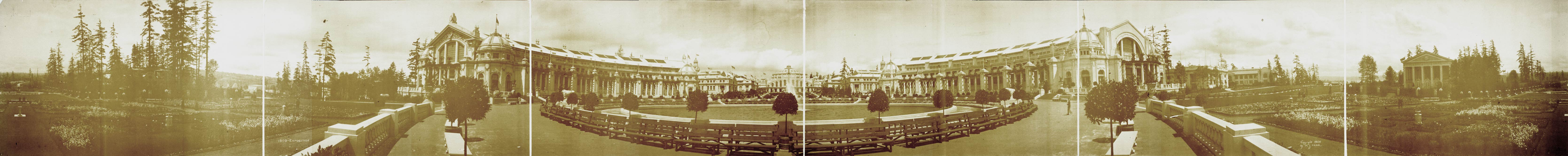
Panoramic view of the Alaska-Yukon-Pacific Exposition. Left to right: YWCA Building and restaurant, Agricultural Building, European Building, Alaska Building, U.S. Government Building, Hawaiian Building, Oriental Building, Manufactures Building, King County Building, Machinery Hall, Music Pavilion. At middle, toward the U.S. Government Building, is the Court of Honor; at edges, in the opposite direction, is Rainier Vista.

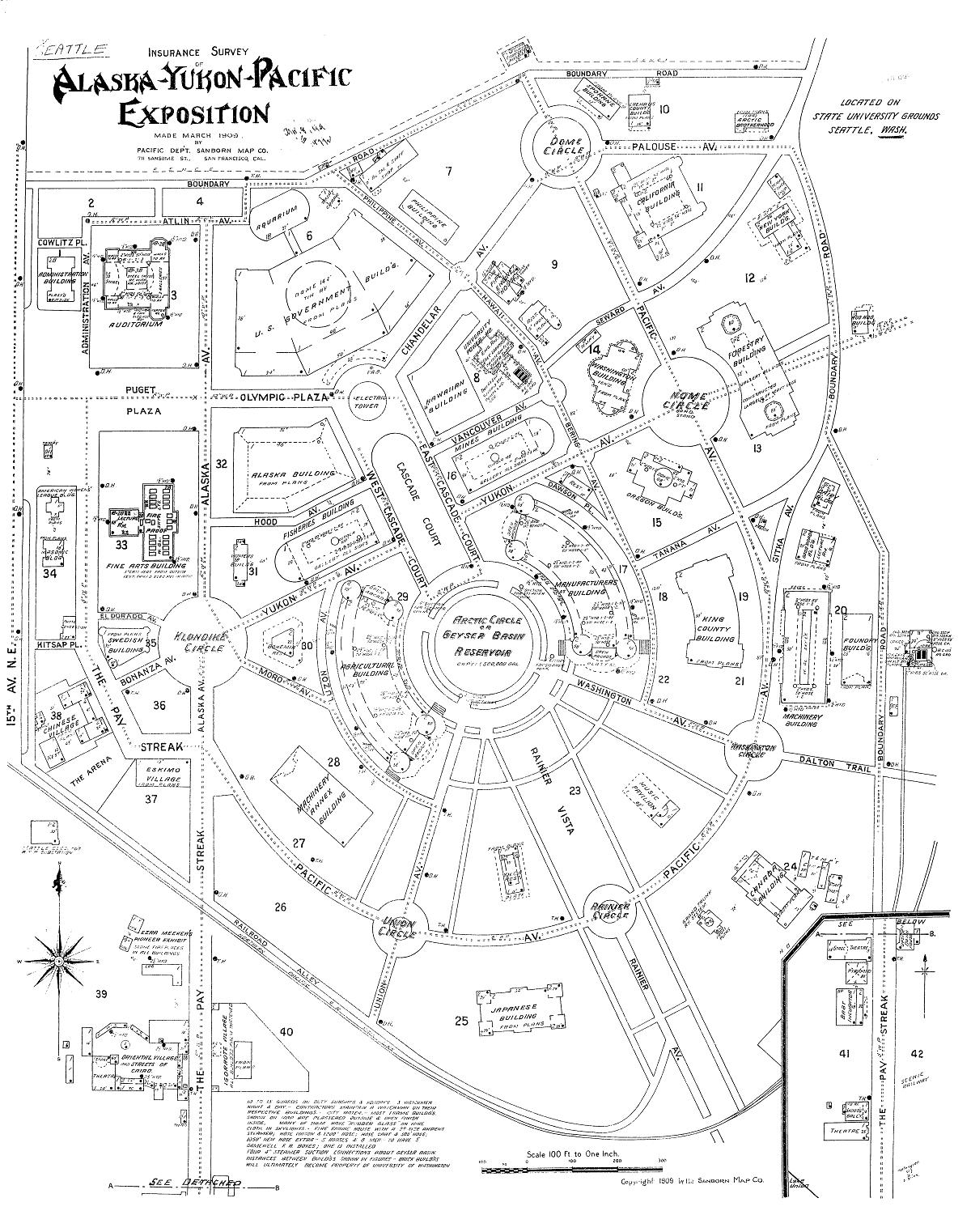
Sanborn map of the A-Y-P grounds. This extremely detailed map was created for insurance purposes.

Godfrey Chealander proposed the idea for the fair. Chealander was then Grand Secretary of the Arctic Brotherhood, was involved in the Alaska Territory exhibit at the 1905 Lewis and Clark Exposition in Portland, Oregon. Originally, he pitched William Sheffield of the Alaska Club and James A. Wood, city editor of the Seattle Times on the idea of a permanent exhibit in Seattle about Alaska. This merged with Wood's desire for an exposition to rival Portland. They soon gained the backing of Times publisher Alden J. Blethen—remarkably, for the time, without gaining the opposition of the rival Seattle Post-Intelligencer. Among other early proponents of the exposition was John Edward Chilberg, one of a line of prominent Seattle merchants in the Chilberg family, who was president of the Alaska Club, and was then given the title of president of the Exposition.

Edmond S. Meany proposed that the exposition be held on the then largely forested campus of the University of Washington, which in 1905 had exactly three buildings and little deliberate landscaping. At the time, this was considered rather far from the center of town, but Meany eventually sold the others involved on the idea that the forested campus could, itself, be an attraction for out-of-town visitors and that the trolley ride from downtown would not be an obstacle to attendance. Of course, he was also highly aware of what the landscaping and structures could do for the campus.

The state legislature endorsed the fair, with the proviso that it would produce at least four permanent buildings, and that any state monetary contribution would be focused mainly on those buildings. King County (the county in which Seattle is located) stepped up with US$300,000 for a forestry exhibit—the largest log cabin ever built—and $78,000 for other exhibits. Because the original Klondike gold strikes had been in Canada, the concept soon evolved to an "Alaska-Yukon Exposition"; later, at the behest of the Seattle Chamber of Commerce, the "Pacific" theme was also added to emphasize the Oriental trade. The Exposition became known as the "A-Y-P" for short

Although the fair almost certainly could have been ready for 1907, it was postponed so as not to conflict with the Jamestown Exposition. This turned out to be good fortune for Seattle, because 1907 proved to be a bad year for the economy. If the exposition had been held that year it almost certainly would have been a financial failure, rather than the success it was in 1909.

== Design and construction ==
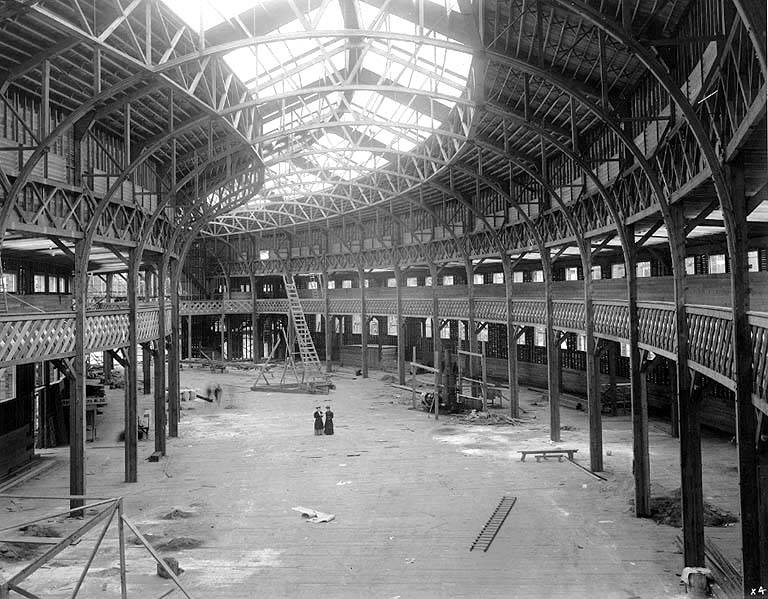
Manufactures Building under construction.

The Olmsted Brothers of Brookline, Massachusetts, were selected to plan the Exposition; the firm was already involved in planning parks and parkways for the City of Seattle. John C. Olmsted visited Seattle in October 1906 and saw the dominant form of Mount Rainier toward the southeast. He selected the mountain as the focus of the primary axis of the Exposition. This axis later became the Rainier Vista of the University of Washington campus.

The principal landscape architect for the fair was the Olmsted firm's James Frederick Dawson. His design centered on a long pool with a series of short waterfalls along Rainier Vista. John Galen Howard's firm, Howard and Galloway, based in San Francisco, was chosen as supervising architects for the Exposition buildings. They designed several buildings and supervised construction of those designed by other architects.

The fairgrounds were entirely ready for the June 1, 1909 opening.

== Exhibits ==
The only foreign countries to erect entire buildings at the fair were Japan and Canada, but their presence was enough to validate the "Pacific" theme along with the US territory of Hawaii and the Philippines, recently ceded to the US by Spain. Other foreign countries were represented on a smaller scale. The very popular King County exhibit included a scale model of the coal mine at nearby Newcastle, Washington and dioramas of several Seattle scenes, the originals of which were only a trolley ride away. The Woman's Building emphasized the role of women in pioneering the American West and in current charity work. The Pay Streak was Seattle's answer to Chicago's Midway and featured games of chance and amusements. There was also a reenactment of the American Civil War naval Battle of Hampton Roads (the Battle of Monitor and Merrimack).

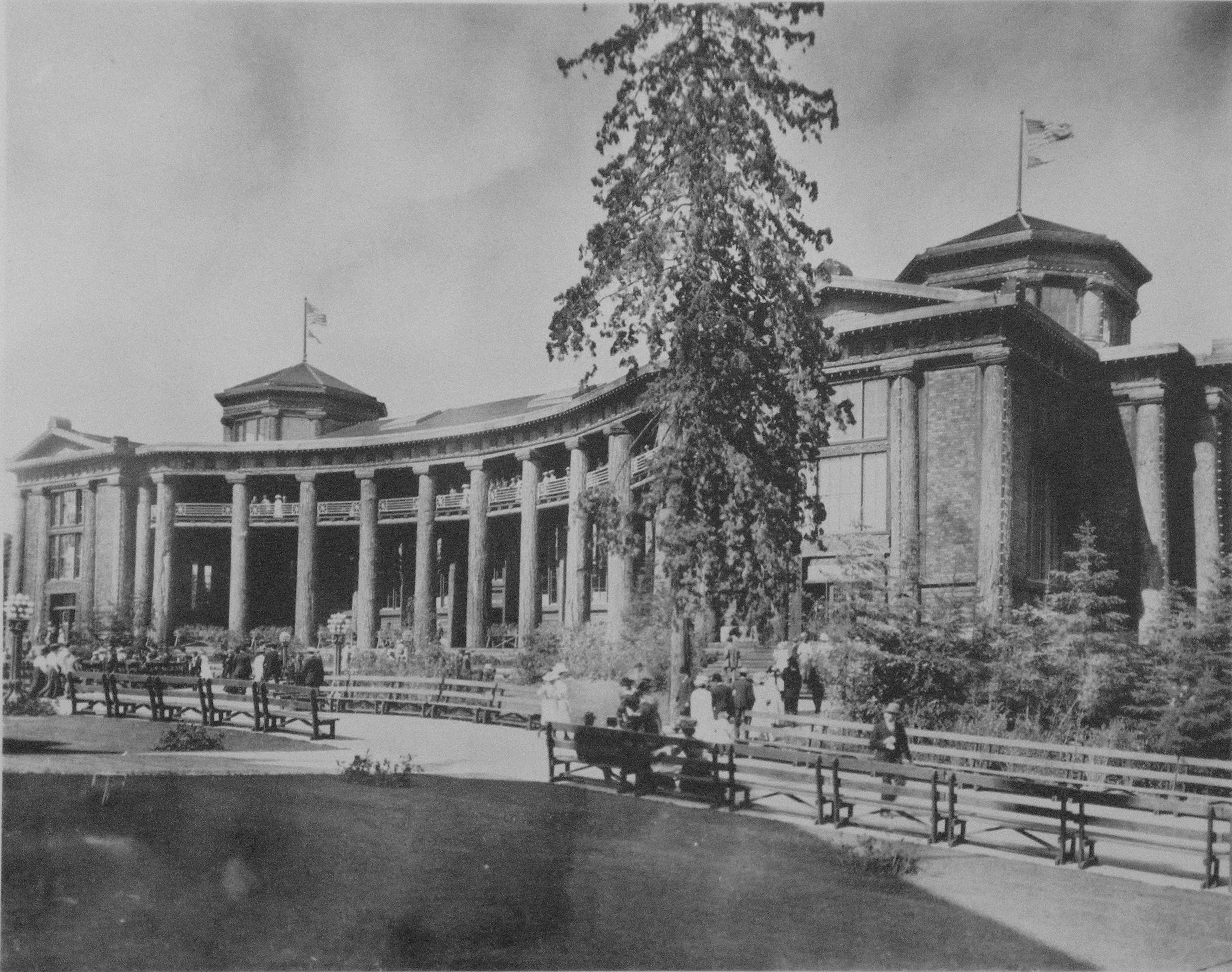
The Forestry Building.

The Hoo-Hoo House and Bastion, which became the UW Faculty Lounge until torn down and replaced mid-century.

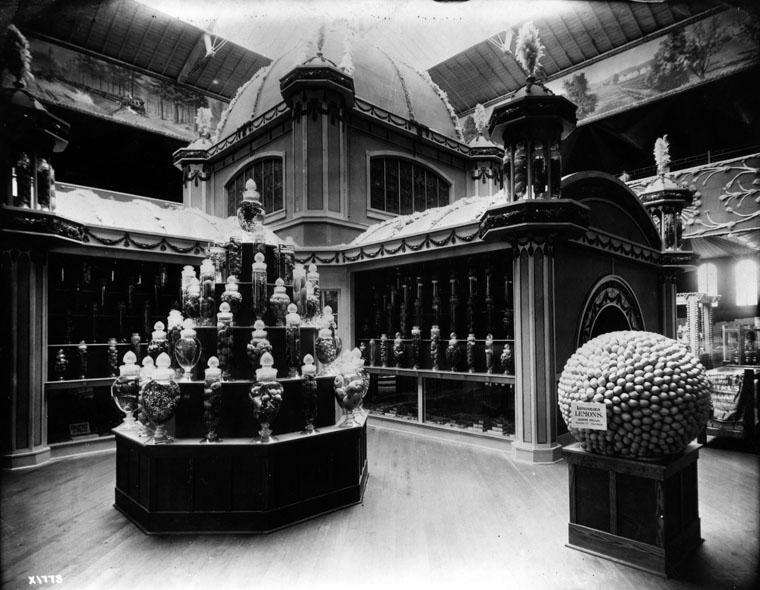
Display of Southern California fruits.

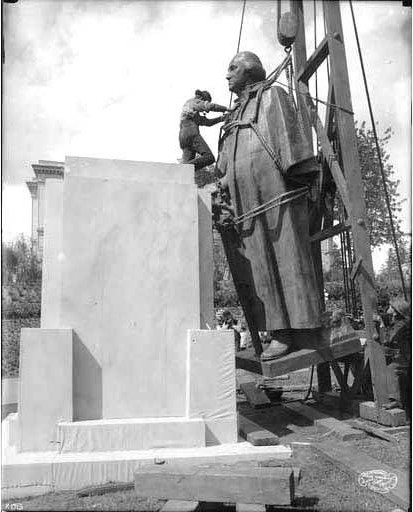
Installing the statue of George Washington that remains on the University of Washington campus

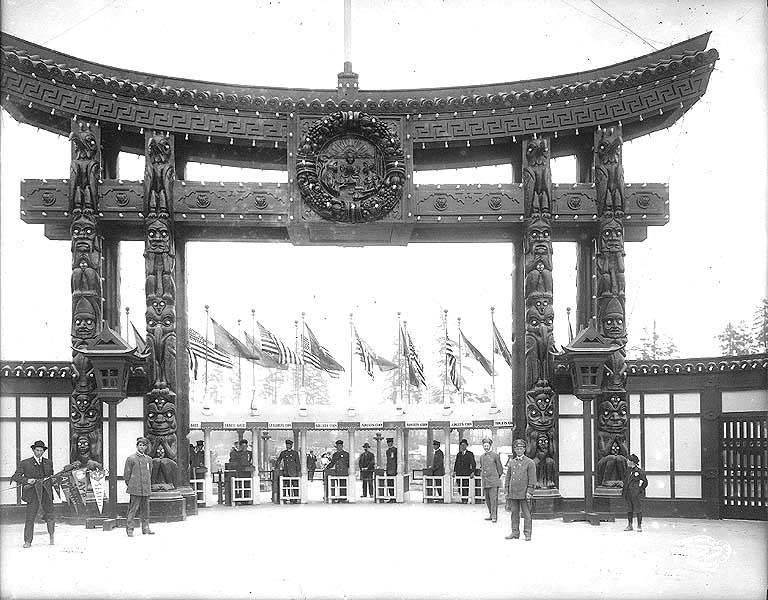
The Japanese style torii gate at the South entrance

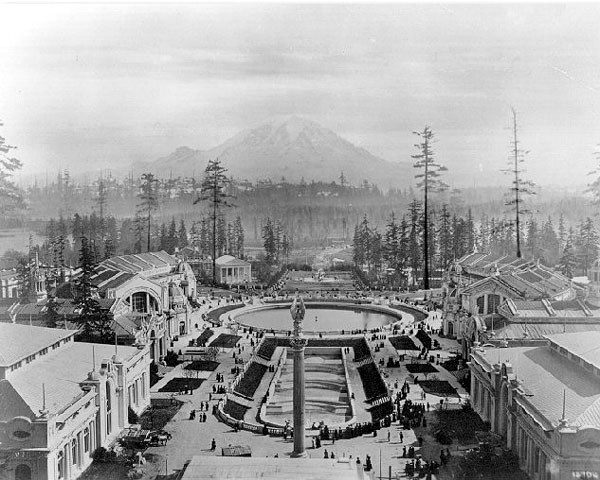
The Alaska–Yukon–Pacific Exposition with a view of Mount Rainier

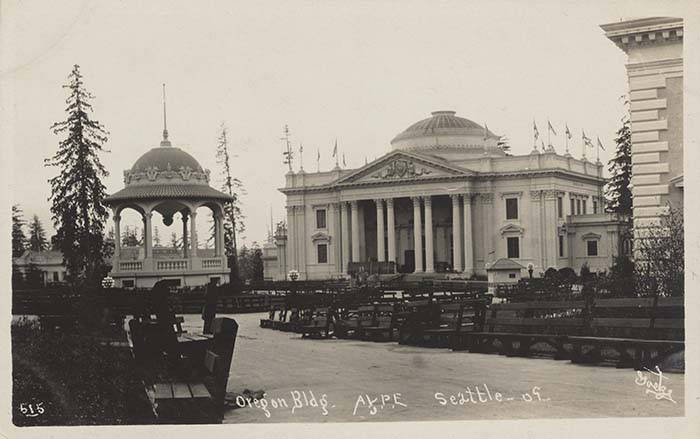
The Oregon State Building was one of the centerpieces of the exhibit and gave the appearance of a state capitol building with a dome roof.

== Opening ceremony ==
The gates opened at 8:30 a.m. on June 1, and crowds entered immediately. At 9:30 a.m., attendees watched performances by military bands from the Army and the Navy. Many sat in the fair's amphitheater, awaiting a signal scheduled to be given in Washington, D.C. At 3 p.m. East Coast time (noon in Seattle), in the East Room of the White House, President Taft sent the signal. He "opened...the Exposition...by touching a gold [telegraph] key, studded with gold nuggets taken from the first mine opened in the Klondike region." The telegraphic spark that Taft sent was received by telegraphers at the fairgrounds; as soon as it arrived, a gong was struck five times, a large American flag was unfurled, and there was a 21-gun salute, while other demonstrations of pageantry announced the official opening of the fair.

== Attendance ==
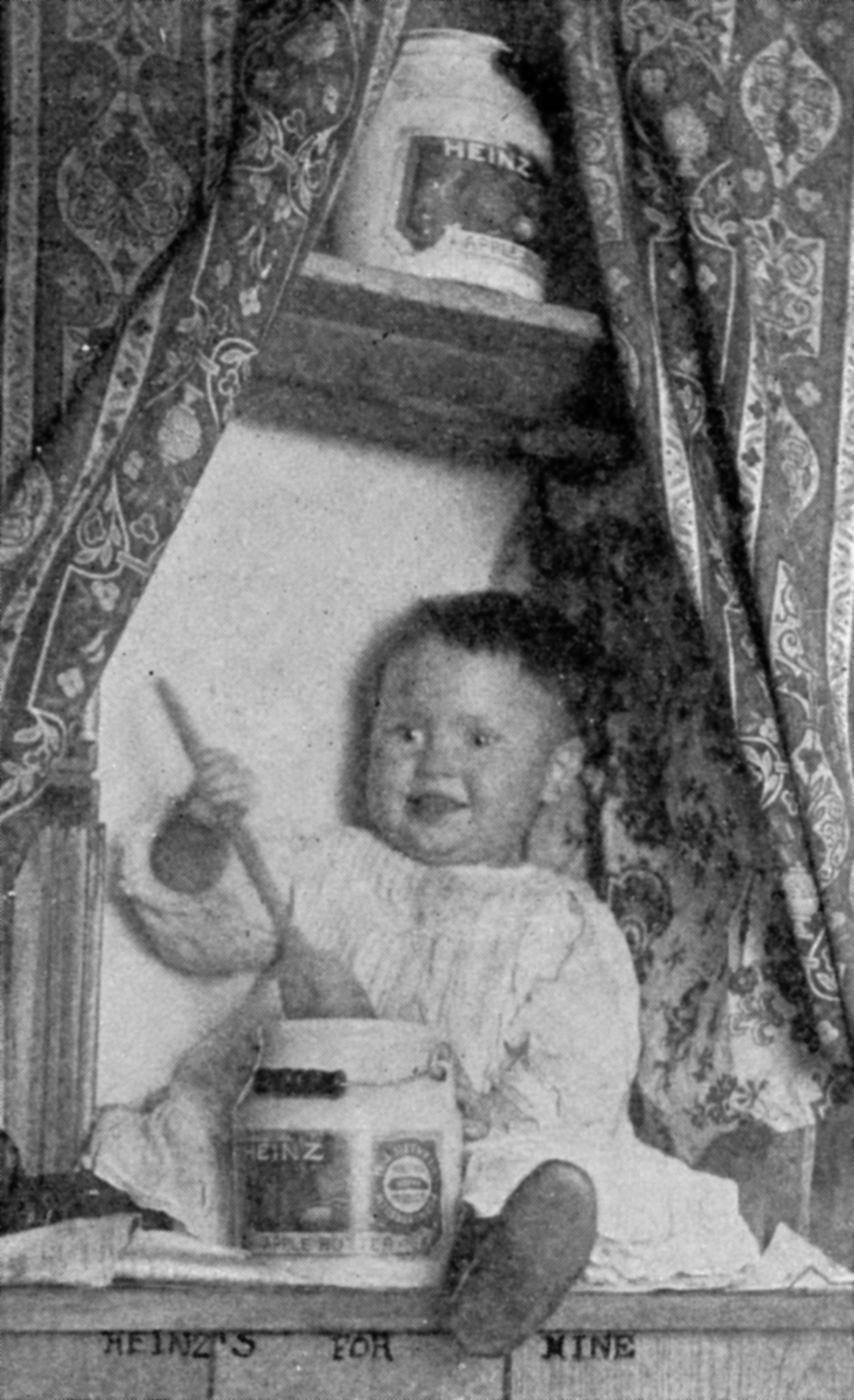
Baby eating Heinz apple butter and smiling, from an H. J. Heinz promotional pamphlet. Originally labelled "PLEASED WITH THE GOODS."

Opening Day, June 1, was declared a city holiday, and 80,000 people attended. Attendance was even higher—117,013—on "Seattle Day". Other big draws were days dedicated to various ethnic groups, fraternal organizations, and U.S. states. By the time the fair closed on October 16, more than 3,700,000 people had visited.

== Publicity ==
The fair had its own publicity department, and it used newspapers and magazines to promote the upcoming exhibition well in advance. In early 1908, Seattle newspapers reported that the publicity department was already showing positive results and the fair was earning many favorable mentions in publications all over the United States. The publicists stressed that this exhibition would be far better organized than 1907's Jamestown Exposition, and would feature entertainment. But what many newspapers found interesting was the assertion that this next World's Fair would not require any financial assistance or subsidies from the U.S. government; the only request made by the fair's directors was that the United States erect buildings and exhibits like any other country.

Throughout 1908, as each new exhibit was built and the fair gradually began to take shape, publicity about the fair's progress was sent out, and frequently printed, nearly verbatim, from the press releases. For example, the Tampa Tribune in Tampa, Florida, printed a story about how the fair would have motor boat races: the article noted that the pavilion for the event was being built on "one of the prettiest spots on the exposition's shoreline." The article praised Puget Sound for being an area perfect for motor boating enthusiasts, and concluded by saying, "The climate is such that motor boating can be enjoyed all the year round."

By early 1909, the focus turned to who was going to attend, as many local newspapers in distant locations wrote articles about residents of their state who planned to make the trip out to Seattle. Also helpful was that several major newspaper conventions were scheduled for the west coast, and the editors were said to be very interested in visiting the fair. The fair's organizers were also able to benefit from advertisements placed in newspapers by the railroads, which encouraged people to travel by rail to Seattle. One such ad, for the Great Northern Railway, promoted the train as the best way to enjoy a scenic trip: "an attractive route over the Rockies and through the Cascades" before finally arriving at what was sure to be "the World's Most Beautiful Fair."

== Legacies ==
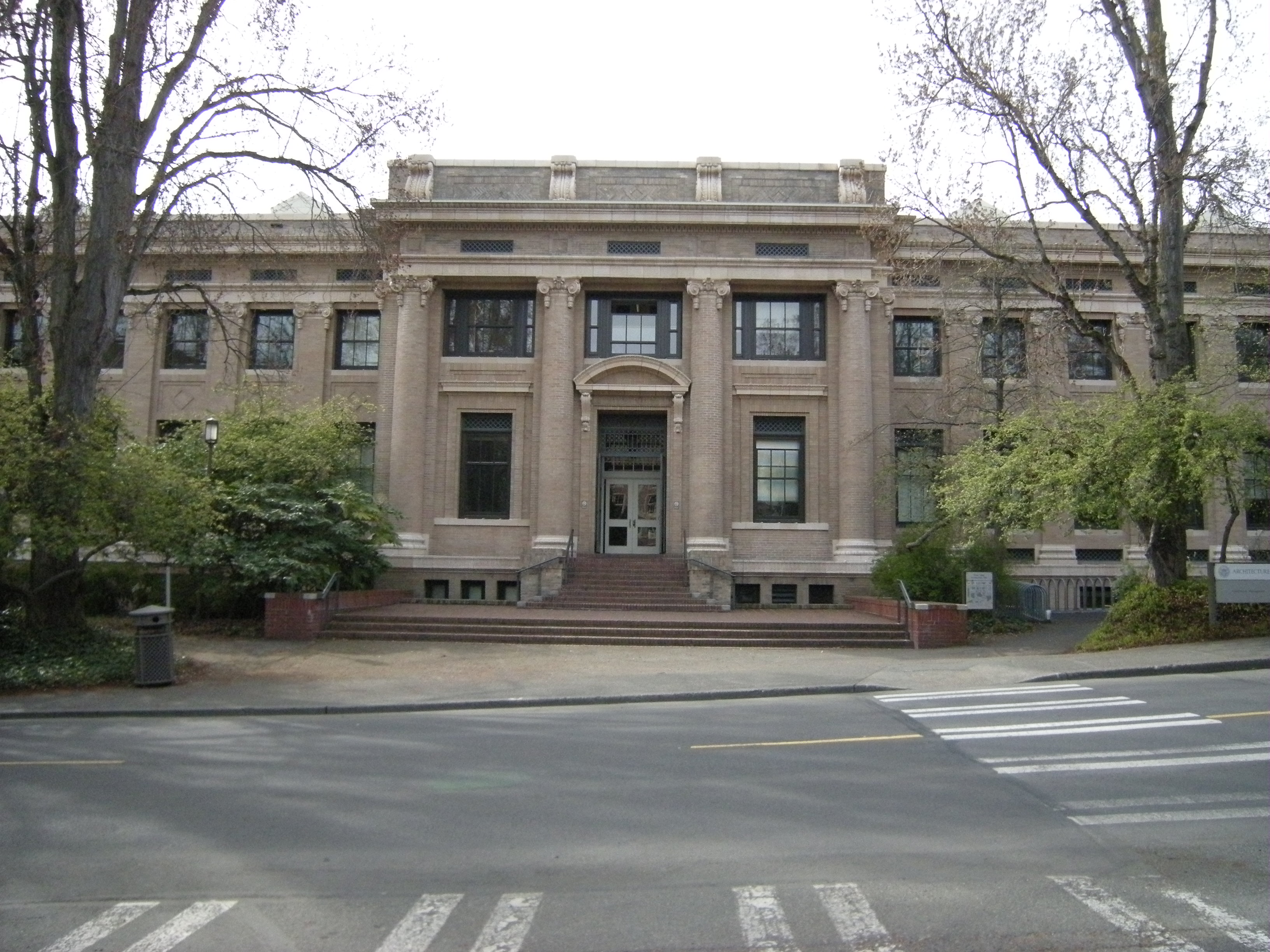
Architecture Hall (2008)

The primary physical legacy of the Alaska–Yukon–Pacific Exposition is the planning framework from the fair which continues to shape the University of Washington campus. The Rainier Vista and Geyser Basin, presently known as Drumheller Fountain, were central features of the exposition and now serve as the focal point of the Science Quadrangle within the university's comprehensive plan.

Although most of the Exposition's buildings were designed as temporary structures, intended to last only for the duration of the fair, some were more permanent. The Fine Arts Palace was designed by Howard and Galloway as a chemistry building. It was used during the A-Y-P for the exhibit of art. After the Exposition was over, chemistry lab tables and other furnishings were moved in and it became the University's primary facility for teaching chemistry. The building was named Bagley Hall (after Daniel Bagley) and retained that name until 1937, when a new chemistry building named Bagley Hall opened. The older building then became the home of Architecture and Physiology. The building survives today, albeit with extensive renovation and restoration, and is known as Architecture Hall.

The A-Y-P Women's Building also survives. During the fair it housed exhibits related to women. Today the building is named Cunningham Hall (after Imogen Cunningham), one of only a few buildings on the University of Washington campus named for women. During the Exposition itself the building was clad in stucco; today it is faced in wood siding. The building now houses various educational and other programs related to women.

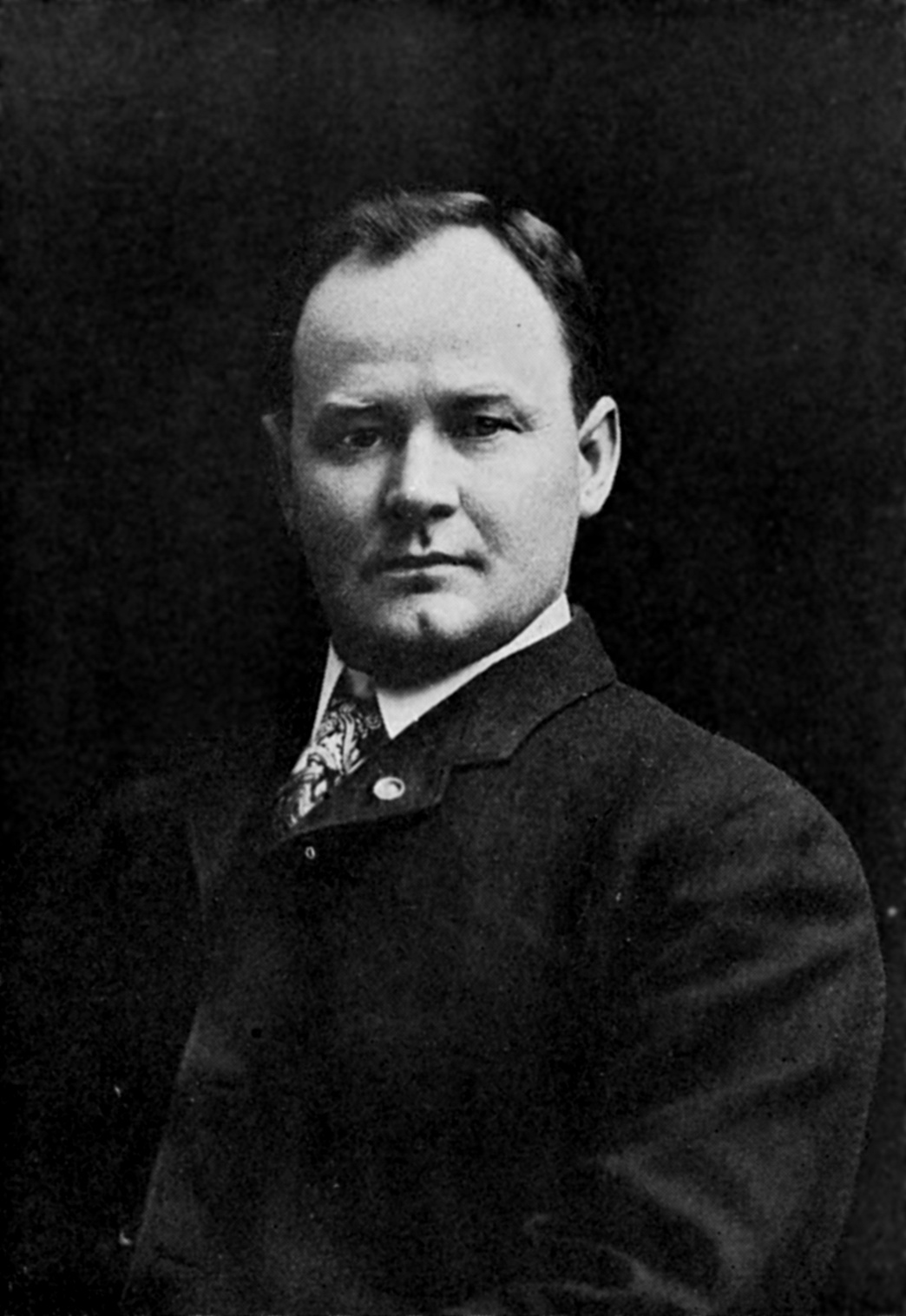
J. E. Chilberg, president of the Alaska-Yukon-Pacific Exposition

Other buildings from the A-Y-P survived for a time, but were subsequently demolished as the university grew. The Forestry Building was demolished mid-century after the natural logs of the structure proved difficult to maintain and few alternative uses for the structure were found. It stood on the site of the current Husky Union Building (HUB). The original Meany Hall, the AYP Auditorium Hall, was damaged by an earthquake in 1965 and subsequently demolished. Another example is the Hoo-Hoo-House, designed by architect Ellsworth Storey, a clubhouse with reception spaces constructed for the Hoo-Hoos, a lumbermen's fraternity. After the fair, this building served as the faculty club until it was replaced in 1958–60 by the current faculty club.

Another legacy of the fair was the enhanced status of exposition president J. E. Chilberg. Although a respected banker, Chilberg had never really been one of the city's elite. He was drafted into his position with the fair simply as a man who was known to be good at getting things done, but without consideration by the city's elite that they had just made an outsider into something tantamount to royalty for the duration of a social season. Suddenly, any party at their First Hill home became a major event in the social calendar. He and his wife found themselves dining with a close relative of the emperor of Japan and hosting a French ambassador.

The statue of William H. Seward, originally erected for the fair, now stands in Volunteer Park.

William Boeing, founder of Boeing, stated that it was during the Alaska–Yukon–Pacific Exposition when he saw a manned flying machine for the first time and became fascinated with aircraft.

== Controversy ==
=== Labor objections ===
Because the Exposition buildings were built with non-union labor, various unions protested against the exposition in actions ranging from pamphleteering to boycotts. The Central Labor Council organized a protest march outside the grounds on Labor Day. The Seattle Socialist editorialized that the Exposition was "a great fantastic monument to the brutal avarice of the capitalist class."

=== Human exhibits ===
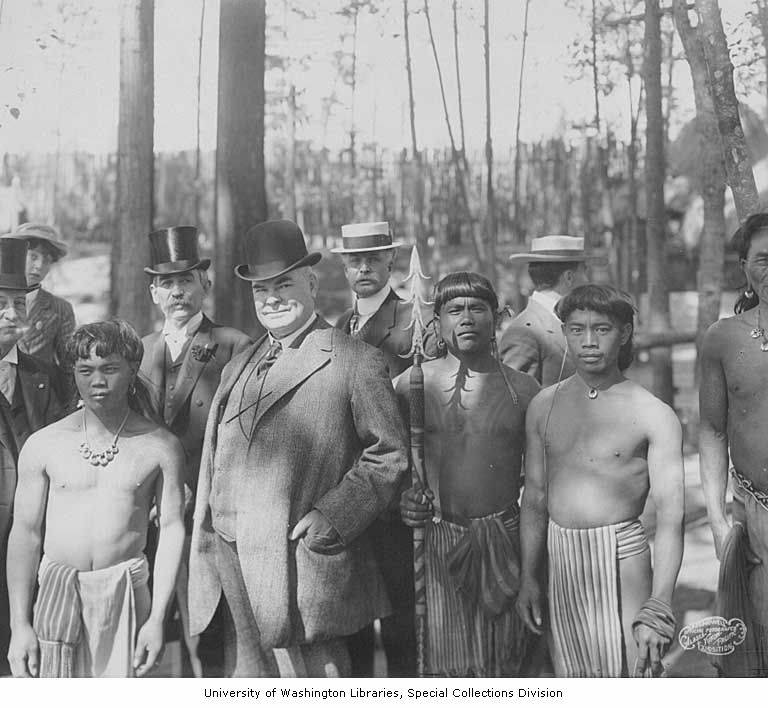
Governor-General of the Philippines, James Francis Smith, posing with Igorot villagers

A month-old orphaned boy named Ernest was raffled away as a prize. Although a winning ticket was drawn, nobody claimed the prize. The ultimate destiny of the child was still being investigated in 2009.

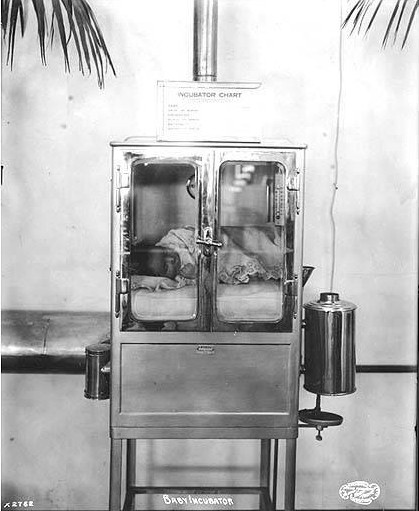
A baby in an incubator, displayed as part of the Pay Streak.

Other human exhibits included displays presenting Igorot people from the Philippines as dog-eating, primitive people; the "Alaskan Siberians — Eskimos"; and a Chinese village depicting opium dens and recounting the recent Boxer Rebellion. The Igorot exhibit spawned a letter of protest to the Seattle Post-Intelligencer signed by over 100 Filipino merchant marines, although some local resident Filipinos responded to the letter by defending the exhibit.

Premature babies were also displayed in French physician Alexandre Lion's incubators, decades before such systems were commonplace in hospitals. This display was not unique to the Alaska–Yukon–Pacific Exposition; babies had been displayed in incubators since the 1896 Berlin Exposition (and Seattle itself had seen at least two such exhibits before the A-Y-P Exposition). Given the robustness of the infants seen in photographs, there is some question as to whether these infants actually required extra care or if they were simply used for profit. Particular to this exhibit was a Baby Incubator Cafe which is seen in some photos, although historians are unsure if this was an actual cafe or rather a place to view babies feeding. At the time there was little in the way of protest from either fair-goers or physicians. In fact there was already a seasonal incubator exhibit at Luna Park in West Seattle, the Infant Electrobator concession. The babies were mentioned by name in the newspaper during their stay at the exposition and their medical state followed throughout. A specific point of interest was the range in ethnicity of the infants. No deaths were experienced amongst the babies at the exhibit.

== Anniversary ==
The year 2009 was the centennial of the Alaska–Yukon–Pacific Exposition. The City and University held various activities to celebrate this anniversary.

A documentary was produced by John Forsen called "AYP-Seattle's Forgotten World's Fair" for PBS.

== See also ==
- Century 21 Exposition, Seattle's 1962 World's Fair
- Statue of George Washington (Seattle), a statue dedicated during the fair
