= Strange Stories (TV series) =

Strange Stories is a 30-minute American television supernatural anthology series which was hosted by Edward Arnold and aired in first-run syndication in 1956.

Guest stars included Brian Keith, Vera Miles, Charles Coburn, Spring Byington, and DeForest Kelley.
