= List of Paramount Pictures films (1940–1949) =

The following is a list of films originally produced and/or distributed theatrically by Paramount Pictures and released in the 1940s. All films listed are currently owned by Universal Television through EMKA, Ltd. unless noted otherwise.

== 1940 ==
Release date	Title	Notes
January 5, 1940	Emergency Squad	
January 19, 1940	Remember the Night	
January 26, 1940	Santa Fe Marshal	The twenty-seventh Hopalong Cassidy film
February 2, 1940	Parole Fixer	
February 15, 1940	Sidewalks of London	Worldwide distribution (outside the UK) only, produced by Mayflower Pictures Original British title: St. Martin's Lane
February 23, 1940	Knights of the Range	
March 1, 1940	Seventeen	
March 8, 1940	Adventure in Diamonds	
March 8, 1940	The Showdown	The twenty-eighth Hopalong Cassidy film
March 15, 1940	Women Without Names	
March 22, 1940	Road to Singapore	The first of the Bob Hope-Bing Crosby Road films
March 29, 1940	The Farmer's Daughter	
April 12, 1940	Dr. Cyclops	
April 17, 1940	The Light of Western Stars	
April 28, 1940	French Without Tears	Distribution only; Two Cities Films Production (UK)
May 10, 1940	Opened by Mistake	
May 17, 1940	Typhoon	
May 24, 1940	The Biscuit Eater	
May 31, 1940	Buck Benny Rides Again	
June 7, 1940	Hidden Gold	The twenty-ninth Hopalong Cassidy film
June 14, 1940	Safari	
June 21, 1940	The Ghost Breakers	
June 28, 1940	Queen of the Mob	
July 5, 1940	The Way of All Flesh	
July 12, 1940	Stagecoach War	The thirtieth Hopalong Cassidy film
July 14, 1940	Those Were the Days!	
July 24, 1940	Untamed	
August 2, 1940	Golden Gloves	
August 9, 1940	Mystery Sea Raider	
August 16, 1940	Comin' Round the Mountain	
August 23, 1940	The Great McGinty	
September 6, 1940	Rhythm on the River	
September 13, 1940	Life with Henry	The second of Paramount's Aldrich Family comedies
September 20, 1940	I Want a Divorce	
September 27, 1940	Rangers of Fortune	
October 11, 1940	Cherokee Strip	
October 16, 1940	The Quarterback	
October 22, 1940	North West Mounted Police	
October 23, 1940	World of Flames	
October 25, 1940	Christmas in July	
November 1, 1940	Dancing on a Dime	
November 8, 1940	Arise, My Love	
November 15, 1940	Three Men from Texas	The thirty-first Hopalong Cassidy film
December 3, 1940	Second Chorus (Note: Retained by Paramount (via Melange Pictures))	
December 6, 1940	A Night at Earl Carroll's	
December 11, 1940	Moon Over Burma	
December 13, 1940	Texas Rangers Ride Again	
December 21, 1940	Victory	
December 27, 1940	Love Thy Neighbor	

== 1941 ==
Release date	Title	Notes
January 10, 1941	Doomed Caravan	The thirty-second Hopalong Cassidy film
January 28, 1941	Virginia	
February 14, 1941	The Mad Doctor	
February 19, 1941	You're the One	
February 28, 1941	The Monster and the Girl	
March 14, 1941	In Old Colorado	The thirty-third Hopalong Cassidy film
March 21, 1941	The Lady Eve	Inducted into the National Film Registry in 1994
March 26, 1941	I Wanted Wings	
March 28, 1941	Las Vegas Nights	
April 4, 1941	The Round Up	
April 11, 1941	Road to Zanzibar	The second of the Road films
April 18, 1941	Border Vigilantes	The thirty-fourth Hopalong Cassidy film
May 2, 1941	Reaching for the Sun	
May 23, 1941	Pirates on Horseback	The thirty-fifth Hopalong Cassidy film
June 4, 1941	Power Dive	Produced by Pine-Thomas Productions
June 8, 1941	The Hard-Boiled Canary	
June 13, 1941	One Night in Lisbon	
June 20, 1941	West Point Widow	
July 4, 1941	Caught in the Draft	
July 11, 1941	Forced Landing	Produced by Pine-Thomas Productions
July 18, 1941	The Shepherd of the Hills	
July 25, 1941	The Parson of Panamint	
August 1, 1941	Kiss the Boys Goodbye	
August 8, 1941	Wide Open Town	The thirty-sixth Hopalong Cassidy film
August 21, 1941	World Premiere	
August 27, 1941	Aloma of the South Seas	
August 29, 1941	Flying Blind	Produced by Pine-Thomas Productions
September 17, 1941	Riders of the Timberline	The thirty-seventh Hopalong Cassidy film
September 17, 1941	Stick to Your Guns	The thirty-eighth Hopalong Cassidy film
September 26, 1941	Hold Back the Dawn	Nominee for the Academy Award for Best Picture
September 29, 1941	Twilight on the Trail	The thirty-ninth Hopalong Cassidy film
October 3, 1941	Buy Me That Town	
October 10, 1941	Nothing but the Truth	
October 24, 1941	Henry Aldrich for President	The third of Paramount's Aldrich Family comedies.
October 31, 1941	New York Town	
November 1, 1941	Outlaws of the Desert	The fortieth Hopalong Cassidy film
November 7, 1941	Birth of the Blues	
November 15, 1941	Secret of the Wastelands	The forty-first and final Hopalong Cassidy film produced by Paramount Pictures
November 21, 1941	Skylark	
November 28, 1941	The Night of January 16th	
December 1, 1941	No Hands on the Clock	Produced by Pine-Thomas Productions
December 5, 1941	Mr. Bug Goes to Town	The Fleischer's second and final animated feature film
December 5, 1941	Glamour Boy	
December 10, 1941	Bahama Passage	
December 19, 1941	Among the Living	
December 31, 1941	Louisiana Purchase	
December 31, 1941	Pacific Blackout	

== 1942 ==
Release date	Title	Notes
January 19, 1942	Fly-by-Night	
January 24, 1942	The Fleet's In	
January 24, 1942	The Lady Has Plans	
January 24, 1942	Torpedo Boat	produced by Pine-Thomas Productions
February 6, 1942	Sullivan's Travels	Inducted into the National Film Registry in 1990
March 5, 1942	The Remarkable Andrew	
March 21, 1942	True to the Army	
March 26, 1942	Reap the Wild Wind	
April 2, 1942	My Favorite Blonde	
April 24, 1942	This Gun for Hire	
April 29, 1942	The Great Man's Lady	
May 6, 1942	Take a Letter, Darling	
May 9, 1942	Dr. Broadway	
June 5, 1942	Henry and Dizzy	The fourth of Paramount's Aldrich Family comedies.
June 13, 1942	Tombstone, the Town Too Tough to Die	
June 15, 1942	Are Husbands Necessary?	
June 16, 1942	I Live on Danger	produced by Pine-Thomas Productions
June 25, 1942	Beyond the Blue Horizon	
July 1, 1942	Night in New Orleans	
July 13, 1942	Sweater Girl	
July 23, 1942	Priorities on Parade	
August 11, 1942	Wake Island	Nominee for the Academy Award for Best Picture
September 3, 1942	Wildcat	produced by Pine-Thomas Productions
September 4, 1942	Holiday Inn	Holiday Inn hotel chain was named after this film. Introduced the Academy Award for Best Original Song, "White Christmas", by Irving Berlin and performed by Bing Crosby.
September 16, 1942	The Major and the Minor	
September 1942	Henry Aldrich, Editor	The fifth of Paramount's Aldrich Family comedies.
October 3, 1942	Street of Chance	
October 21, 1942	The Forest Rangers	
October 23, 1942	The Glass Key	
October 1942	Mrs. Wiggs of the Cabbage Patch	
November 7, 1942	My Heart Belongs to Daddy	
November 7, 1942	Wrecking Crew	produced by Pine-Thomas Productions
November 10, 1942	Road to Morocco	The third of the Road films Inducted into the National Film Registry in 1996
November 16, 1942	Lucky Jordan	
November 24, 1942	The Avengers (Note: Owned by ITV Studios)	Original British title: The Day Will Dawn
December 2, 1942	Star Spangled Rhythm	

== 1943 ==
Release date	Title	Notes
January 1, 1943	The Palm Beach Story	
January 2, 1943	Lady Bodyguard	
January 4, 1943	Happy Go Lucky	
February 19, 1943	No Time for Love	
March 17, 1943	Salute for Three	
March 20, 1943	Aerial Gunner	produced by Pine-Thomas Productions
March 27, 1943	High Explosive	produced by Pine-Thomas Productions
April 21, 1943	China	
April 30, 1943	Henry Aldrich Gets Glamour	The sixth of Paramount's Aldrich Family comedies.
May 4, 1943	Five Graves to Cairo	
May 31, 1943	Night Plane from Chungking	
June 23, 1943	Dixie	
June 23, 1943	Henry Aldrich Swings It	The seventh of Paramount's Aldrich Family comedies.
June 24, 1943	Alaska Highway	produced by Pine-Thomas Productions
June 28, 1943	Submarine Alert	produced by Pine-Thomas Productions
July 14, 1943	For Whom the Bell Tolls	Nominee for the Academy Award for Best Picture
August 5, 1943	Let's Face It	
August 11, 1943	The Good Fellows	
August 1943	Tornado	produced by Pine-Thomas Productions
September 9, 1943	So Proudly We Hail!	
October 11, 1943	Hostages	
November 10, 1943	Henry Aldrich Haunts a House	The eighth of Paramount's Aldrich Family comedies.
November 10, 1943	Minesweeper	produced by Pine-Thomas Productions
November 11, 1943	Riding High	
December 24, 1943	True to Life	

== 1944 ==
Release date	Title	Notes
January 7, 1944	Standing Room Only	
January 13, 1944	Henry Aldrich, Boy Scout	The ninth of Paramount's Aldrich Family comedies.
January 13, 1944	Timber Queen	produced by Pine-Thomas Productions
February 10, 1944	Lady in the Dark	
February 26, 1944	The Uninvited	
February 26, 1944	The Navy Way	produced by Pine-Thomas Productions
February 28, 1944	You Can't Ration Love	
February 1944	The Miracle of Morgan's Creek (Note: Retained by Paramount)	Inducted into the National Film Registry in 2001
April 25, 1944	And the Angels Sing	
April 26, 1944	The Hitler Gang	
April 27, 1944	Gambler's Choice	produced by Pine-Thomas Productions
April 1944	Henry Aldrich Plays Cupid	The tenth of Paramount's Aldrich Family comedies.
May 3, 1944	Going My Way	Winner of the Academy Award for Best Picture Inducted into the National Film Registry in 2004
May 10, 1944	The Hour Before the Dawn	
June 9, 1944	Take It Big	produced by Pine-Thomas Productions
June 10, 1944	Henry Aldrich's Little Secret	The eleventh and last of Paramount's Aldrich Family comedies.
July 4, 1944	The Story of Dr. Wassell	
July 6, 1944	Double Indemnity	Nominee for the Academy Award for Best Picture Inducted into the National Film Registry in 1992
August 9, 1944	Hail the Conquering Hero	Inducted into the National Film Registry in 2015
August 15, 1944	I Love a Soldier	
August 30, 1944	Till We Meet Again	
September 2, 1944	Our Hearts Were Young and Gay	
September 5, 1944	Rainbow Island	
September 6, 1944	The Great Moment	
September 24, 1944	The National Barn Dance	
September 1944	Dark Mountain	produced by Pine-Thomas Productions
November 22, 1944	And Now Tomorrow	
November 24, 1944	One Body Too Many	produced by Pine-Thomas Productions
December 18, 1944	Dangerous Passage	produced by Pine-Thomas Productions
December 18, 1944	Double Exposure	
December 18, 1944	Here Come the Waves	
December 20, 1944	Practically Yours	
December 31, 1944	Ministry of Fear	

== 1945 ==
Release date	Title	Notes
January 8, 1945	Frenchman's Creek	
January 19, 1945	The Man in Half Moon Street	
February 2, 1945	High Powered	produced by Pine-Thomas Productions
March 30, 1945	Bring on the Girls	
April 16, 1945	A Medal for Benny	
April 25, 1945	Salty O'Rourke	
May 12, 1945	The Unseen	
June 22, 1945	Scared Stiff	produced by Pine-Thomas Productions
June 23, 1945	Murder, He Says	
July 8, 1945	The Affairs of Susan	
July 13, 1945	Out of This World	
July 27, 1945	Midnight Manhunt	produced by Pine-Thomas Productions
August 2, 1945	You Came Along	co-production with Hal Wallis Productions, Inc.
August 31, 1945	Incendiary Blonde	
September 28, 1945	Duffy's Tavern	
October 26, 1945	Love Letters	
November 16, 1945	The Lost Weekend	Winner of the Academy Award for Best Picture Inducted into the National Film Registry in 2011
November 23, 1945	Hold That Blonde	
December 3, 1945	Masquerade in Mexico	
December 14, 1945	Follow That Woman	produced by Pine-Thomas Productions
December 28, 1945	The Stork Club	

== 1946 ==
Release date	Title	Notes
January 11, 1946	People Are Funny	produced by Pine-Thomas Productions
January 25, 1946	Kitty	
February 8, 1946	Tokyo Rose	produced by Pine-Thomas Productions
March 8, 1946	Miss Susie Slagle's	
March 12, 1946	To Each His Own	
March 22, 1946	Road to Utopia	The fourth Road film, filmed and produced in 1943
May 3, 1946	They Made Me a Killer	produced by Pine-Thomas Productions
May 5, 1946	The Virginian	
May 8, 1946	The Blue Dahlia	
May 17, 1946	The Well Groomed Bride	
May 26, 1946	O.S.S.	
June 5, 1946	The Bride Wore Boots	
June 14, 1946	Our Hearts Were Growing Up	
June 28, 1946	Hot Cargo	produced by Pine-Thomas Productions
August 9, 1946	The Searching Wind	
September 4, 1946	Monsieur Beaucaire	
September 6, 1946	Swamp Fire	produced by Pine-Thomas Productions
September 13, 1946	The Strange Love of Martha Ivers	
October 16, 1946	Blue Skies	
November 22, 1946	Two Years Before the Mast	

== 1947 ==
Release date	Title	Notes
January 10, 1947	Cross My Heart	
January 24, 1947	The Perfect Marriage	
February 7, 1947	Ladies' Man	
February 13, 1947	Suddenly, It's Spring	
February 21, 1947	California	
February 27, 1947	I Cover Big Town	produced by Pine-Thomas Productions
March 7, 1947	Easy Come, Easy Go	
March 28, 1947	Seven Were Saved	produced by Pine-Thomas Productions
April 4, 1947	My Favorite Brunette	distribution only; co-production with Hope Enterprises (Note: Owned by Fremantle)
April 10, 1947	Fear in the Night	produced by Pine-Thomas Productions
April 23, 1947	Calcutta	
April 25, 1947	The Imperfect Lady	
May 2, 1947	Blaze of Noon	
May 23, 1947	Big Town	produced by Pine-Thomas Productions
June 10, 1947	Dear Ruth	
June 13, 1947	Welcome Stranger	
June 20, 1947	Danger Street	produced by Pine-Thomas Productions
June 25, 1947	The Trouble with Women	
July 4, 1947	The Perils of Pauline	
August 13, 1947	Adventure Island	produced by Pine-Thomas Productions
August 15, 1947	Desert Fury	
August 22, 1947	Jungle Flight	produced by Pine-Thomas Productions
August 27, 1947	Golden Earrings	
August 29, 1947	Variety Girl	
September 26, 1947	Wild Harvest	
October 10, 1947	Unconquered	
November 21, 1947	Where There's Life	
December 12, 1947	Big Town After Dark	produced by Pine-Thomas Productions
December 25, 1947	Road to Rio	distribution only; co-production with Bing Crosby Enterprises and Hope Enterprises; The fifth Road film

== 1948 ==
Release date	Title	Notes
January 16, 1948	I Walk Alone	
February 20, 1948	Albuquerque	produced by Pine-Thomas Productions
March 5, 1948	Caged Fury	produced by Pine-Thomas Productions
March 26, 1948	Mr. Reckless	produced by Pine-Thomas Productions
March 31, 1948	Saigon	
April 9, 1948	The Big Clock	
April 19, 1948	Hatter's Castle	
April 30, 1948	The Sainted Sisters	
May 14, 1948	Speed to Spare	produced by Pine-Thomas Productions
May 27, 1948	Big Town Scandal	produced by Pine-Thomas Productions
May 28, 1948	Hazard	
June 11, 1948	Shaggy	produced by Pine-Thomas Productions
June 25, 1948	Waterfront at Midnight	produced by Pine-Thomas Productions
June 30, 1948	A Foreign Affair	
July 2, 1948	The Emperor Waltz	
July 27, 1948	Dream Girl	
August 3, 1948	Beyond Glory	
August 6, 1948	So Evil My Love	
September 1, 1948	Sorry, Wrong Number	produced by Hal Wallis Productions
October 6, 1948	Isn't It Romantic?	
October 22, 1948	Night Has a Thousand Eyes	
November 5, 1948	Sealed Verdict	
November 19, 1948	Miss Tatlock's Millions	
December 3, 1948	Disaster	produced by Pine-Thomas Productions
December 9, 1948	Whispering Smith	
December 24, 1948	The Paleface	

== 1949 ==
Release date	Title	Notes
January 12, 1949	The Accused	
January 18, 1949	Dynamite	produced by Pine-Thomas Productions
February 2, 1949	My Own True Love	
March 4, 1949	Alias Nick Beal	
April 7, 1949	Bride of Vengeance	
April 22, 1949	A Connecticut Yankee in King Arthur's Court	
May 11, 1949	Streets of Laredo	
May 25, 1949	Manhandled	produced by Pine-Thomas Productions
July 4, 1949	Sorrowful Jones	
July 13, 1949	The Great Gatsby	
July 22, 1949	Special Agent	produced by Pine-Thomas Productions
August 4, 1949	Rope of Sand	
August 5, 1949	El Paso	produced by Pine-Thomas Productions
August 31, 1949	Top o' the Morning	
September 5, 1949	Red, Hot and Blue	
October 14, 1949	My Friend Irma	
October 28, 1949	Song of Surrender	
November 3, 1949	Chicago Deadline	
November 15, 1949	Dear Wife	
November 23, 1949	The Great Lover	
December 21, 1949	Samson and Delilah	
December 28, 1949	The Heiress	Nominee for the Academy Award for Best Picture; Last film in the post-1928 and pre-1950 library owned by Universal Television via EMKA, Ltd. Inducted into the National Film Registry in 1996
