= Fast and Loose (1939 film) =

1939 film by Edwin L. Marin

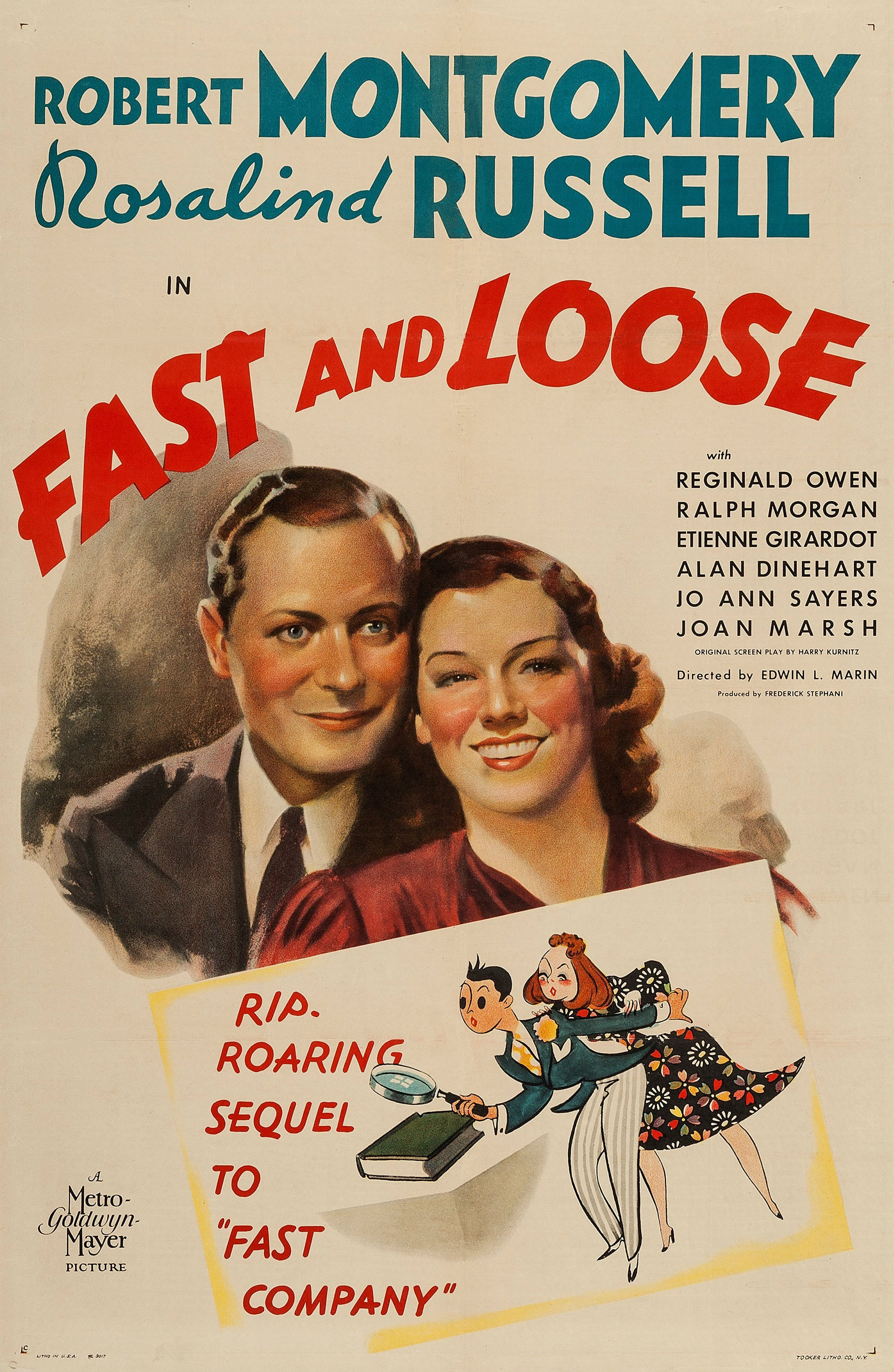
- original theatrical poster
- Directed by: Edwin L. Marin
- Written by: Harry Kurnitz
- Produced by: Frederick Stephani
- Starring: Robert Montgomery; Rosalind Russell
- Cinematography: George J. Folsey
- Edited by: Elmo Veron
- Production company: Metro-Goldwyn-Mayer
- Distributed by: Loew's Inc.
- Release date: February 17, 1939
- Running time: 80 minutes
- Country: United States
- Language: English

Fast and Loose is a 1939 American thriller film directed by Edwin L. Marin and starring Robert Montgomery, Rosalind Russell and Reginald Owen. It is a sequel to the 1938 film Fast Company and was followed the same year by Fast and Furious. In each film, different actors played the crime-solving couple.

== Plot ==
Rare booksellers Joel and Garda Sloane try to solve a murder, which hinges on a missing scrap of a William Shakespeare manuscript.

== Cast ==
- Robert Montgomery as Joel Sloane
- Rosalind Russell as Garda Sloane
- Reginald Owen as Vincent Charlton
- Ralph Morgan as Nicholas "Nick" Torrent
- Etienne Girardot as Christopher Oates
- Alan Dinehart as David Hilliard
- Jo Ann Sayers as Christine Torrent
- Joan Marsh as Bobby Neville
- John Hubbard as Phil Sergeant
- Tom Collins as Gerald Torrent
- Sidney Blackmer as "Lucky" Nolan
- Donald Douglas as Inspector Forbes
- Ian Wolfe as Mr Wilkes
- Mary Forbes as Mrs Torrent
- Leonard Carey as Craddock, Mrs Torrent's butler

== Reception ==
In the March 9, 1939 issue of The New York Times, Frank Nugent wrote: "a sense of humor, a facile style, genial performances and just enough puzzlement to keep us from suspecting the least suspicious member of the cast".

On July 27, 2008, Dennis Schwartz gave the film a B, concluding: “It’s cleverly hidden who the guilty party is until the last minute of the third act, as until then many of the characters wind up with shiners and the son of the tycoon gets cut off from his father’s will for being such a jerk. This enjoyable film is the final pairing of Rosalind and Montgomery, who appeared in several successful films during the 1930s together.”
