= Fast and Furious (1939 film) =

1939 film by Busby Berkeley

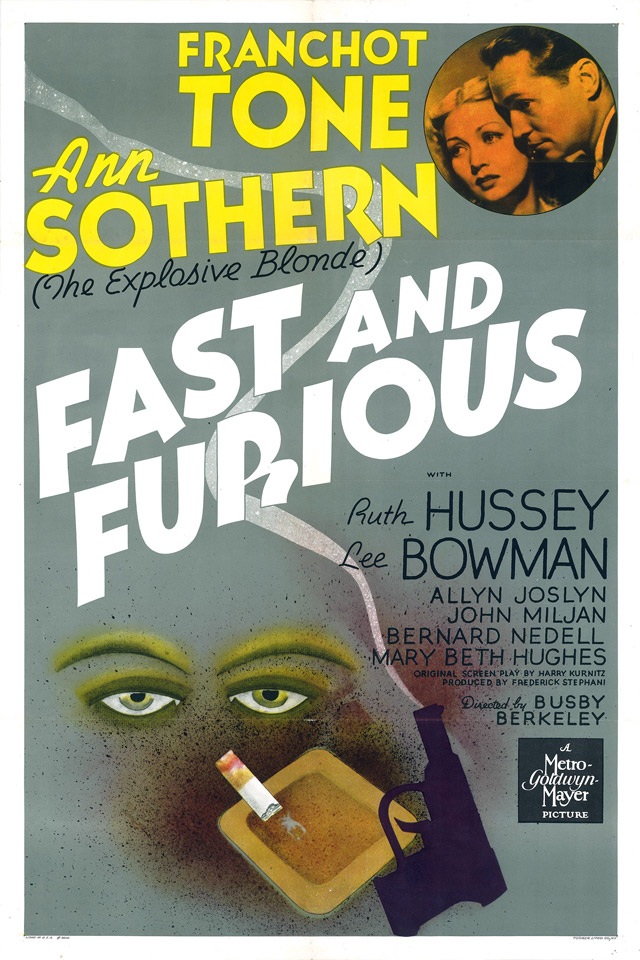
- Theatrical release poster
- Directed by: Busby Berkeley; John E. Burch (assistant)
- Written by: Harry Kurnitz
- Produced by: Frederick Stephani
- Starring: Franchot Tone; Ann Sothern
- Cinematography: Ray June
- Edited by: Elmo Veron
- Music by: Daniele Amfitheatrof; Constantin Bakaleinikoff
- Distributed by: Metro-Goldwyn-Mayer
- Release date: October 6, 1939
- Running time: 73 minutes
- Country: United States
- Language: English

Fast and Furious is a 1939 American mystery comedy film directed by Busby Berkeley. The film stars Franchot Tone and Ann Sothern as Joel and Garda Sloane, a crime-solving married couple who are also rare book dealers. It is the last of a Metro-Goldwyn-Mayer trilogy, along with Fast Company (1938) and Fast and Loose (1939). However, different actors played the couple each time.

== Plot ==
Joel and Garda Sloane, a husband and wife sleuthing duo, sell rare books in New York and dream of taking a vacation to escape the sweltering heat of the city. Joel decides to take Garda to Seaside City, where his friend Mike Stevens is managing a beauty pageant. In addition to his vacation plans, Joel, who has invested $5,000 in the pageant, plans to supervise the event's finances. Soon after arriving in Seaside City, Joel discovers that Eric Bartell, the unscrupulous promoter of the pageant, is duping Stevens. Garda is troubled to learn that Joel is a pageant judge and becomes jealous when he socializes with the contestants prior to the pageant.

Joel senses trouble when New York racketeer Ed Connors arrives to monitor Bartell's activities and when Lily Cole, Bartell's publicity director, lashes out at contestant Jerry Lawrence for vying with her for Bartell's attentions. A detective tells Joel that Bartell will be arrested on swindling charges as soon as a warrant is issued. When Bartell is mysteriously murdered, Stevens is arrested and suspected of the crime because he had visited Bartell to demand all of the money owed to him and was last person seen with Bartell. Although Joel and Garda are warned by Chief Miller not to involve themselves in the case, along with the help of newspaper columnist Ted Bentley they begin to investigate the murder. Soon after, an attempt is made on their lives when a falling elevator nearly crushes them. Joel does not believe that Stevens was the murderer, but instead suspects Lily, because she and Bartell were involved in a dispute prior to the murder. Later, when Joel discovers that Jerry smokes the same brand of cigarettes as the one found smoldering at the scene of Bartell's murder, he interrogates her and she names Connors as the murderer. Connors, overhearing her accusation, attacks her and tells Joel that she is trying to frame him.

When Jerry is found murdered, Joel deduces that the murderer must be Bentley, because he is the only person who knew that he had proof against Jerry. Joel tricks Bentley into confessing his guilt, but Bentley, in an attempt to silence Joel, tries to kill him. However, he is prevented from doing so by the police, who arrest him. Eventually, Joel learns that Bentley killed Bartell because Jerry threw him over for Bartell, and that he killed Jerry because she knew too much.

== Cast ==
- Franchot Tone as Joel Sloane
- Ann Sothern as Garda Sloane
- Ruth Hussey as Lily Cole
- Lee Bowman as Mike Stevens
- Allyn Joslyn as Ted Bentley
- John Miljan as Eric Bartell
- Bernard Nedell as Ed Connors
- Mary Beth Hughes as Jerry Lawrence
- Cliff Clark as Sam Travers
- James Burke as Clancy
- Frank Orth as Captain Joe Burke
- Margaret Roach as Emmy Lou
- Gladys Blake as Miss Brooklyn
- Granville Bates as Chief Miller
- Inna Gest as Miss San Antonio

== Reception ==
In a contemporary review for The New York Times, critic Bosley Crowther compared the teaming of Franchot Tone and Ann Sothern unfavorably with the leads from the previous two films in the series and wrote: "Metro seems to be stretching an original idea to infinity–a suspicion which is practically confirmed by the plot of 'Fast and Furious.' It is a perfect specimen of unoriginal attenuation ... which results in a couple of murders, a couple of limp comedy situations and an interminable lot of chasing about leading nowhere. Mr. Tone and Miss Sothern banter through it in the manner of third-string substitutes who know that the game is hopelessly lost."

== See also ==
- List of film series with three entries
