= Brad King =

Brad King may refer to:

- Brad King (politician) (born 1956), Democratic member of the Utah State House of Representatives
- Brad King (actor) (1917–1991), American actor
- Brad King (alpine skier) (born 1966), Canadian alpine skier
- Brad King (Hollyoaks), a fictional character

== See also ==
- Bradley King (disambiguation)
