= Trouble at Melody Mesa =

1949 film

- Directed by: W. Merle Connell
- Written by: Ned Dandy
- Produced by: Birger E. Williamson
- Starring: See below
- Cinematography: William C. Thompson
- Edited by: Elmo Veron
- Release date: 1 July 1949
- Running time: 60 minutes
- Country: United States
- Language: English

Trouble at Melody Mesa is a 1949 American Western film directed by W. Merle Connell.

== Cast ==
- Brad King as Marshal Brad King
- Cal Shrum as Cal Shrum
- Lorraine Miller as Mathilda 'Matty' Simmons
- I. Stanford Jolley as Mark Simmons
- Walt Shrum as Walt Shrum
- Alta Lee as Alta Lee (Shrum)
- Jimmie Shrum as Jimmy Henshaw
- Carl Sepulveda as Henchman
- Stacey Alexander as Musician
- Robert Hoag as Musician
- Virgil 'Ace' Dehne as Ace
- Bob Woodward as Henchman
- Sue Gamboa as Singer
- Rusty Cline as Musician
- Dusty Taylor as Musician
- Jack Gress as Musician
- Frank Bertoldi as Musician
- Lefty Walker as Musician
- John Blackburn as Specialty Act, Barn Dance Champion
- Paula Blackburn as Specialty Act, Barn Dance Champion
- Don Weston as Musician
