= Riders of the Timberline =

1941 film by Lesley Selander

- Theatrical release poster
- Directed by: Lesley Selander
- Screenplay by: J. Benton Cheney
- Produced by: Harry Sherman
- Starring: William Boyd; Andy Clyde; Brad King; Victor Jory; Eleanor Stewart; J. Farrell MacDonald; Anna Q. Nilsson
- Cinematography: Russell Harlan
- Edited by: Fred R. Feitshans Jr.
- Music by: John Leipold
- Production company: Harry Sherman Productions
- Distributed by: Paramount Pictures
- Release date: September 17, 1941
- Running time: 59 minutes
- Country: United States
- Language: English

Riders of the Timberline is a 1941 American Western film directed by Lesley Selander and written by J. Benton Cheney. The film stars William Boyd, Andy Clyde, Tom Tyler, Brad King, Victor Jory, Eleanor Stewart, J. Farrell MacDonald and Anna Q. Nilsson. The film was released on September 17, 1941, by Paramount Pictures. This entry is the first in the Hopalong Cassidy (film series) to feature Brad King as Johnny Nelson, replacing Russell Hayden as Lucky Jenkins. Certain action sequences in the film feature the use of a Steam Donkey. This was the 38th entry in the "Hopalong Cassidy" western series.

== Plot ==
Hoppy, Johnny and California come to the aid of Jim Kerrigan and his daughter Elaine, who are being forced out of their timber lease by Preston Yates and his men.

== Cast ==
- William Boyd as Hopalong Cassidy
- Andy Clyde as California Carlson
- Brad King as Johnny Nelson
- Victor Jory as Baptiste Deschamp
- Eleanor Stewart as Elaine Kerrigan
- J. Farrell MacDonald as Jim Kerrigan
- Anna Q. Nilsson as Donna Ryan
- Tom Tyler as Henchman Bill Slade
- Edward Keane as Preston Yates
- Hal Taliaferro as Ed Petrie
- Mickey Eissa as Larry
- The Guardsmen Quartet as Singing Lumbermen
