= Lewis Allen (director) =

British director (1905-2000)

- Born: 25 December 1905; Oakengates, Shropshire, England, U.K.
- Died: 3 May 2000 (aged 94); Santa Monica, California, U.S.
- Occupation: Director
- Years active: 1943–1977

Lewis Allen (25 December 1905 – 3 May 2000) was a British director whose credits included classic television series and a diverse range of films. Allen worked mainly in the United States, working on Broadway and directing 18 feature films between 1944 and 1959. From the mid-1950s he moved increasingly into television and worked on a number of the most popular shows of the time in the US.

== Career ==
Allen was born in the small Shropshire town of Oakengates and attended Tettendan Hall in Staffordshire. On leaving school he joined the Merchant Navy for four years.

After leaving the service he became, briefly, an actor, before moving into London theatrical management, first for Raymond Massey and later for Gilbert Miller.

=== Broadway ===
In 1935 he began working on Broadway. His credits include directing the U.S. premieres of J.B. Priestley's Laburnum Grove (1935) (131 performances) and The Amazing Dr. Clitterhouse (1937) with Cedric Hardwicke.

He was general stage director (i.e.: in charge of the stage management team) on Victoria Regina (1935–36) (a big hit, with Helen Hayes and Vincent Price), Tovarich (1936–37) (another success, 356 performances) and French Without Tears (1937–38). He then directed Priestley's I Have Been Here Before (1938) and Ben Hecht and Charles MacArthur's Ladies and Gentleman with Helen Hayes (1939–40). Allen then received an offer to direct for Paramount.

Allen went to London to direct a production of The Women in 1940, then in May 1941 he signed a contract at Paramount Pictures.

=== Paramount ===
Allen went to Paramount in 1941. They trained him for a number of years. He directed a wartime propaganda short Freedom Comes High (1944) and was dialogue director in Dixie (1943).

He was given his first chance to direct a feature film in 1943. He made a highly auspicious debut with The Uninvited, an atmospheric and memorable ghost story set on the misty coast of south-west England, starring Ray Milland and Gail Russell. The film was very favourably received and subsequently acquired the status of a classic of its genre.

Allen again worked with Russell twice, in Our Hearts Were Young and Gay (1945), a comedy, and on The Unseen (1945), a film with a similar supernatural theme which is often considered the unofficial follow-up to The Uninvited.

He was borrowed by RKO in Those Endearing Young Charms (1945) - a big hit at the time.

In January 1946 Allen signed a new contract with Paramount. For that studio he directed a romantic comedy The Perfect Marriage (1947) with David Niven and Loretta Young; The Imperfect Lady (1947) with Ray Milland and Teresa Wright and Desert Fury (1947), a noir-ish Western drama starring Lizabeth Scott and Burt Lancaster.

In 1948 Allen returned to Britain to film So Evil My Love, a lavishly mounted, melodramatic period thriller set in Victorian London, which reunited him with Milland, playing an out-and-out bad lot ruining the lives of Ann Todd and Geraldine Fitzgerald.

Allen later said that he found Milland a pleasure to work with, and the two teamed up again in Sealed Verdict (1948), a topical drama dealing with the prosecution of Nazi war criminals in the American-occupied zone of post-war Germany.

Allen did some second unit directing on The Great Gatsby (1949) with Alan Ladd. He then made a pair of Alan Ladd vehicles, Chicago Deadline (1950) and Appointment with Danger (1951).

RKO hired Allen to direct a swashbuckler At Sword's Point, filmed 1949 and released 1951. He was borrowed by Edward Small to direct the biopic Valentino (1951). He then left Paramount.

=== Television ===
Allen began directing TV, episodes of Your Favorite Story (1953–54) (which he also produced) and Meet Corliss Archer.

In 1954 he directed the tense and claustrophobic Frank Sinatra vehicle Suddenly which became, alongside The Uninvited, his most widely known and highly regarded film.

In 1955 Allen directed two Edward G. Robinson films, A Bullet for Joey and Illegal.

He continued to direct episodes of TV, such as I Led 3 Lives, Mr. District Attorney, Screen Directors Playhouse, The Ford Television Theatre, The 20th Century-Fox Hour ("Cavalcade"), Telephone Time, Goodyear Theatre, Alcoa Theatre and Decision.

He directed the DuMont television series Ethel Barrymore Theater, filmed in 1953 and shown in syndication as Stage 8 in 1958.

In Britain, he produced and directed Sean Connery and Lana Turner in the soapy melodrama Another Time, Another Place (1958).

He directed Whirlpool (1959), a woman-on-the-run drama made for the Rank Organisation but filmed on location in Germany.

=== Later career ===
Allen's later career was focused on television, where he directed episodes of The David Niven Show, Bonanza, The Rifleman, Zane Grey Theater, Route 66, Perry Mason, The Barbara Stanwyck Show, The Detectives, The Dick Powell Theatre, Checkmate, and Target: The Corruptors.

His last film as director was Decision at Midnight (1963) which he also produced.

Later TV credits included Arrest and Trial, Burke's Law, The Rogues, The Big Valley, The Long, Hot Summer, A Man Called Shenandoah, Court Martial, The Fugitive, The Invaders, The F.B.I., My Friend Tony, The Guns of Will Sonnett, The Survivors, Paris 7000, Dan August, Cannon, Mission: Impossible, Griff, Little House on the Prairie, and The Oregon Trail.

Most notably, he directed 42 episodes of long-running series Bonanza, spanning the show's entire 14-year run.

He retired in 1977.

=== Andy Warhol Robot ===
In 1981, Allen worked on a project with Andy Warhol and Peter Sellars that would create a traveling stage show with a life-sized animatronic robot in the exact image of Warhol. The Andy Warhol Robot would then be able to read Warhol's diaries as a theatrical production. Warhol was quoted as saying, "I’d like to be a machine, wouldn’t you?" This was also made in part by Alvaro Villa, a robotics expert who worked as a Disney Imagineer.

== Personal life ==
Allen was married twice: to English literary agent Dorothy Skinner (died 1969 – one son) and Trudy Colmar, who survived him. Allen died in Santa Monica, California on 3 May 2000, aged 94. He was survived by one son.

== Filmography ==
- Freedom Comes High (1944)
- The Uninvited (1944)
- Our Hearts Were Young and Gay (1944)
- Those Endearing Young Charms (1945)
- The Unseen (1945)
- The Perfect Marriage (1947)
- The Imperfect Lady (1947)
- Desert Fury (1947)
- So Evil My Love (1948)
- Sealed Verdict (1948)
- Chicago Deadline (1949)
- Valentino (1951)
- Appointment with Danger (1951)
- At Sword's Point (1952)
- Suddenly (1954)
- A Bullet for Joey (1955)
- Illegal (1955)
- Another Time, Another Place (1958)
- Whirlpool (1959)

== Television credits (main) ==
- Your Favorite Story (1953–1954)
- Meet Corliss Archer (1954)
- The 20th Century Fox Hour (1955–1957)
- Ethel Barrymore Theatre (1956)
- Telephone Time (1956–1957)
- Perry Mason (1958–1961)
- The Rifleman (1959–1960)
- Bonanza (1960–1973)
- The Detectives Starring Robert Taylor (1961–1962)
- Arrest and Trial (1963–1964)
- Burke's Law (1964)
- The Rogues (1965)
- The F.B.I. (1966–1968)
- The Fugitive (1967)
- Mission: Impossible (1967–1973)
- The Invaders (1968)
- Dan August (1970)
- Griff (1973)
- Little House on the Prairie (1975)
