= Russell Arms =

American singer and actor (1920–2012)

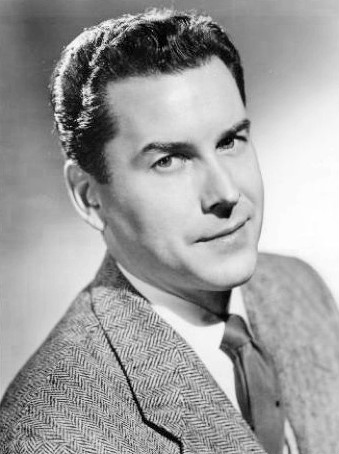
- Arms in 1956
- Born: Russell Lee Arms; February 3, 1920; Berkeley, California, U.S.
- Died: February 13, 2012 (aged 92); Hamilton, Illinois, U.S.
- Occupations: Actor, singer
- Years active: 1942–1985
- Spouses: Barbara J. McGinnis (m. 1966; div. 1974): Mary Lynne Arms

Russell Lee Arms (February 3, 1920 – February 13, 2012) was an American actor and singer.

== Career ==
Arms was born on February 3, 1920 in Berkeley, California, gaining acting experience via the Pasadena Playhouse. He began his career on radio, including working at WNEW in New York City.

He moved up to minor screen roles during World War II as a contract player with Warner Bros. In his screen debut, he played Richard, the son of the Stanleys, in 1942's The Man Who Came to Dinner. He later worked as a freelance performer, mostly in Westerns. Subsequently, he appeared in supporting roles in both feature films and television. In 1953 he played the role of Chester Finley, a piano instructor and hopeful suitor to Doris Day, in the film By the Light of the Silvery Moon.

From 1952 to 1957, he was best known as a vocalist on Your Hit Parade, an NBC television series that reviewed the popular songs of the day and on which a regular cast of vocalists would perform the top seven songs of the week. Arms and Eileen Wilson (who starred on the show from 1950 to 1952) were the only surviving lead performers from the show until Arms' death in 2012. He authored an autobiography in 2005, My Hit Parade... and a Few Misses. During his career as a singer, he was also well known for his 1957 hit single, "Cinco Robles (Five Oaks)", which entered the charts on January 12, 1957 and stayed there for 15 weeks, peaking at No. 22. In 1957, he released the album Where Can A Wanderer Go, on the Era label. The same year he was a singer on The Hidden Treasure Show, "the first nationwide quiz show in which home viewers win the money...". The syndicated program was sponsored by Disabled American Veterans.

On television dramas, Arms made three guest appearances on Perry Mason, including the role of Attorney Everett Dorrell in the 1960 episode "The Case of the Credulous Quarry", and as Roger Correll in the 1963 episode "The Case of the Greek Goddess". Additionally, he appeared in the 1961 episode "Bad Sheriff" on the long-running series Gunsmoke, portraying a crooked lawman who tries to keep the money seized by stagecoach robbers. For the next two decades he continued to act periodically in other television series, including the CBS sitcom Ichabod and Me in 1962 and the NBC drama Gibbsville in 1976.

A 1958 newspaper story about Arms noted, "Although Arms started in show business as an actor, he became a singer 'by accident,' and now he can't get anyone to believe he can act. 'I'm now in the process of proving them wrong,' he said."

== Personal life ==
Arms and his second wife, Mary Lynne, resided in Palm Springs, California for many years. They then moved to Hamilton, Illinois, where Arms died on February 13, 2012, aged 92.

== Filmography ==
Year	Title	Role	Notes
1942	The Man Who Came to Dinner	Richard Stanley	
1942	Captains of the Clouds	Louis 'Alabama' Prentiss	
1942	Always in My Heart	Red	
1942	Wings for the Eagle	Pete Hanso	
1946	Deception	Music Student	Uncredited
1947	That Way with Women	Fred Spafford	Uncredited
1947	Life with Father	Operator of Stock Quote Ticker	Uncredited
1947	Stage to Mesa City	Postal Inspector Hardy	Uncredited
1947	The Fighting Vigilantes	Henchman	
1947	High Wall	Patient Awaiting Discharge Hearing	Uncredited
1948	Check Your Guns	Hired Gunman	Uncredited
1948	Tornado Range	Killer Dorgan aka Ben Colton	
1948	Wallflower	Bobby	Uncredited
1948	The Checkered Coat	Dr. Stevenson	
1948	Daredevils of the Clouds	Jimmy	
1948	Beyond Glory	Officer Milliken	Uncredited
1948	Sealed Verdict	Nissen's Aide	Uncredited
1948	Quick on the Trigger	Fred Reed	
1948	Loaded Pistols	Larry Evans	
1948	Smoky Mountain Melody	Bruce 'Kid' Corby	
1949	John Loves Mary	Corporal	Uncredited
1949	Cover Up	Frank Baker	
1949	Sons of New Mexico	Lt. Chuck Brunton	
1953	By the Light of the Silvery Moon	Chester Finley	

== Partial discography ==
- The Touch (1954 - Epic 5-9079)
- Cinco Robles (1957 - Era 1026)
- Evangeline (1957 - Era 1033)
