= Luke Short (writer) =

American novelist

Luke Short (born Frederick Dilley Glidden November 19, 1908 – August 18, 1975) was a prolific and popular Western writer. At least twelve of his stories were made into films.

== Biography ==
Born in Kewanee, Illinois, he attended the University of Illinois at Urbana-Champaign for two and a half years and then transferred to the University of Missouri at Columbia to study journalism. Following graduation in 1930, he worked for a number of newspapers before becoming a trapper in Canada. He later moved to New Mexico to be an archeologist's assistant. After reading Western pulp magazines and trying to escape unemployment, he began to write Western fiction. He sold his first short story and novel in 1935 under the pen name of Luke Short (which was also the name of a famous gunslinger in the Old West, although it's unclear if he was aware of that when he assumed the pen name.) His apprenticeship in the pulps was comparatively brief. In 1938, he sold a short story, "The Warning", to Collier's, and in 1941, he sold his novel Blood on the Moon, or Gunman's Chance, to The Saturday Evening Post. Some of his later novels were also serialised in the Post.

His first agent was Marguerite E. Harper in New York, and later, H.N. Swanson in Los Angeles. The latter arranged to get many of his novels and short stories made into films.

After publishing over a dozen novels in the 1930s, he started writing for movies in the 1940s. In 1948 alone, four Luke Short novels appeared as movies. Among his notable film credits are Ramrod (1947) and Blood on the Moon (1948). His novel, The Whip, or Doom Cliff, was serialized in both Collier's and The Saturday Evening Post. The first two parts were published in Collier's in the December 21, 1956, and January 4, 1957, issues. Collier's then ceased publication. The Saturday Evening Post bought the rights to the remaining unpublished installment and published it on February 9, 1957.

Over 35 million copies of his books had been sold by 1972. Among his fans were Dwight D. Eisenhower and Harry S. Truman.

Short continued to write novels, despite increasing trouble with his vision, until his death in 1975.

He married Florence Elder in 1934 and the couple had three children.

== Novels ==
- The Feud at Single Shot, 1935
- The Branded Man, 1936
- The Man on the Blue, 1936
- Marauders' Moon, 1937
- King Colt, 1937
- Brand of Empire, 1937
- Bold Rider, 1938
- Savage Range, 1938
- Raiders of the Rimrock, 1938
- Hard Money, 1938
- Bounty Guns, 1939
- War on the Cimarron, 1939
- Dead Freight for Piute, 1939 — Albuquerque (film), 1948
- Bought with a Gun, 1940
- Barren Land Showdown, 1940
- Raw Land, 1940
- Gunman's Chance, 1941 — Blood on the Moon (film), 1948
- Hardcase, 1941. Dave Coyle is a runt, a trouble-maker, a prankster, and a cold-blooded killer - so they say. But he risks his life to buffalo a town and stop a ranch-taking because a girl was once kind.
- Ride the Man Down, 1942 — Ride the Man Down (film), 1952
- Sunset Graze, 1942
- And the Wind Blows Free, 1943—told in the first person—unique for Short
- Ramrod, 1943 — Ramrod (film), 1947
- Coroner Creek, 1945 — Coroner Creek (film), 1948
- Fiddlefoot, 1946
- Station West, 1946 — Station West (film), 1948. Cavalry officer John Haven must work undercover and alone in prize fights and sawmills to find who stole Army uniforms to then rob a gold bullion shipment.
- Ambush, 1948 — Ambush (film), 1950
- High Vermilion, 1948 — Silver City (film), 1951
- Vengeance Valley, 1949 — Vengeance Valley (film), 1951
- Play a Lone Hand, 1950
- Barren Land Murders, 1951
- Saddle by Starlight, 1952
- Silver Rock, 1953 — Hell's Outpost (film), 1954
- Rimrock, 1955
- The Whip, 1956
- Summer of the Smoke, 1958
- First Claim, 1960
- Desert Crossing, 1961
- Last Hunt, 1962
- The Some-Day Country, 1963
- First Campaign, 1965
- Paper Sheriff, 1965. A sheriff discovers the Hoad clan's new scheme is rustling and murder. He embarks on a one-man feud with the clan - and his wife, a former Hoad in the thick.
- The Primrose Try, 1966
- Debt of Honor, 1967
- The Guns of Hanging Lake, 1968
- Donovan's Gun, 1968
- The Deserters, 1969
- Three for the Money, 1970
- Man from the Desert, 1971
- The Outrider, 1972
- The Stalkers, 1973
- The Man from Two Rivers, 1974
- Trouble Country, 1976

== Short-story collections ==
- Luke Short's Best of the West, 1983, includes 12 short stories - "Pull Your Freight!" (The Hangman, 1959 movie), "Gunslick Gold", "Lead Won’t Lie", "The Warning", "Bounty Hunter", "The Doctor Keeps a Promise", "High Grade", "Florida Manets West", "Court Day", "Payoff at Rain Peak", "Rough Shod", and "Top Hand."
- The Marshal of Vengeance, 1986, includes six short stories - "The Marshal of Vengeance", "The Ghost Deputy of Doubletree", "Death Cold-Decks a Tinhorn", "War Fires Light the Stage Trails", "Hideout", and "Exile".
