= Once More, with Feeling! =

1960 film by Stanley Donen

- Theatrical release poster
- Directed by: Stanley Donen
- Written by: Harry Kurnitz (play and screenplay)
- Produced by: Stanley Donen
- Starring: Yul Brynner; Kay Kendall; Gregory Ratoff
- Cinematography: Georges Périnal
- Edited by: Jack Harris
- Music by: Franz Liszt; Ludwig van Beethoven; Richard Wagner; arranged by Muir Mathieson
- Distributed by: Columbia Pictures
- Release date: 11 February 1960 (U.S.)
- Running time: 92 min
- Country: United Kingdom
- Language: English
- Box office: $1,500,000 (US/ Canada)

Once More, with Feeling! is a 1960 British comedy film starring Yul Brynner and Kay Kendall in her final film appearance and directed and produced by Stanley Donen from a screenplay by Harry Kurnitz, based on his play.

The film was released by Columbia Pictures and has music by Franz Liszt, Ludwig van Beethoven, and Richard Wagner, arranged by Muir Mathieson. The cinematography was by Georges Périnal and the costume design by Givenchy.

== Plot ==
Egomaniacal and temperamental Victor Fabian is the London Festival Orchestra's conductor. His wife, Dolly, is a harpist who acts on her husband's behalf, presenting his impossible demands to the symphony's backers, only to then find him dallying with a considerably younger musician. Dolly decides to leave him, whereupon he destroys her harp.

Victor's conducting suffers in Dolly's absence and the orchestra needs her back. His agent, Max Archer, tries to get him a new contract, but young Wilbur, son of the orchestra's patron saint, insists to Victor's horror that any agreement must include a performance of his mother's favorite piece of music, John Philip Sousa's Stars and Stripes Forever.

Rather than return, Dolly wants a divorce so she can marry Dr. Richard Hilliard, a physicist. An angry Victor blurts out that to be divorced, two people must first be married. It turns out colleagues only assumed Victor and Dolly were husband and wife, and they had never actually tied the knot.

Victor won't grant a quick marriage and equally quick divorce unless she agrees to live with him for three more weeks. He wears down her resolve, and Hilliard catches her in a frilly nightgown. A frustrated Dolly tells both she just wants to live alone. She applauds from the audience as Victor, with great reluctance, launches the orchestra into a rousing Stars and Stripes Forever.

== Cast ==
- Yul Brynner as Dr. Victor Fabian
- Kay Kendall as Dolly Fabian
- Gregory Ratoff as Maxwell Archer
- Geoffrey Toone as Dr. Richard Hilliard
- Maxwell Shaw as Jascha Gendel / Grisha Gendel
- Mervyn Johns as Mr. Wilbur Jr.
- Martin Benson as Luigi Bardini
- Harry Lockart as Chester
- Shirley Anne Field as Angela Hopper

== Background ==
The play Once More, With Feeling, which was adapted for this film, opened in New Haven in September 1958 and then on Broadway on 21 October 1958 at the National Theatre, in a production directed by George Axelrod and designed by George Jenkins, and starring Joseph Cotten, Arlene Francis, and Walter Matthau, who was nominated for a Tony Award as Best Featured Actor. The play ran for 263 performances.

The film was Kay Kendall's last. She died of leukemia on 6 September 1959 before the film's release.

== Novelization ==
In January, 1960, Pyramid Books issued a paperback novelization "based on the stage and screen plays"; the author was celebrated American potboiler novelist and showbiz biographer Ann Pinchot (1905–1998). The cover price was 35¢. It was concurrently published in the UK, also as a paperback, by WDL; the cover price was 2'6. The nearly identical front panel designs feature a painting by prolific paperback cover artist Tom Miller, intimately depicting Kay Kendall, reclining on a couch with a martini, and Yul Brynner, behind the couch, leaning in.
