= W. Merle Connell =

American film director (1905–1963)

- Born: January 7, 1905; Yakima, Washington
- Died: November 25, 1963 (aged 58); Los Angeles
- Occupation: Film director
- Years active: 1947-1967
- Notable work: Untamed Women

William Merle Connell was born on January 7, 1905, in Yakima, Washington. In 1926, Connell married Jennie Ramsey. Connell died on November 25, 1963, in Los Angeles. Connell directed a number of American burlesque films, and exploitation films, including Untamed Women.

== Career ==
Connell's "Quality Pictures" distributed a one-reel burlesque compilations, including: Juke-Box Follies (1945), and Variety Girls (c. 1955).

"Quality Pictures, a small studio on Santa Monica Boulevard run by producer-director W. Merle Connell, was one of the preeminent companies putting out burlesque films for the peepshow and theatrical markets. Connell filmed Los Angeles burlesque dancers in short, two-to-three-minute performances and packaged the segments as single-reel compilations, producing twenty-five of these by 1947. Keeping a hand in the peepshow market, Quality also bought and sold Panorams and converted them for a fee. By the 1950s, Quality had begun focusing on narrative films as well; the Quality Pictures studio was even used for several Ed Wood movies, including Plan 9 from Outer Space (1959)."

== Film director ==
- A Night at the Follies (1947) with Evelyn West

filmed at a burlesque stage show at the Follies Theater in Los Angeles

- Test Tube Babies (1948)
- The Devil's Sleep (1949)
- Trouble at Melody Mesa (1949)
- Midnight Frolics (1949) with Annette Warren
- International Burlesque (1950)
- Ding Dong (1951)

filmed at Moulin Rouge Theatre, 485 8th Street, Oakland, California
also known as A Night at the Moulin Rouge

- Home Town Girl (1951)
- Untamed Women (1952)
- The Flesh Merchant (1956)
- The Wild and Wicked (1956)
- Not Tonight Henry (1961)
- The Pill (1967)

== Cinematographer ==
- Dance Hall Racket
- The Cape Canaveral Monsters
- The Jailbreakers

== See also ==
- TCM Underground
