= Cecile Kramer =

American screenwriter

- Born: Cecile Lewis; August 22, 1911; Cincinnati, Ohio, USA
- Died: February 24, 1999 (aged 87); Los Angeles, California, USA
- Occupation: Screenwriter

Cecile Kramer (1911 – 1999) was an American screenwriter primarily known for her contributions to B-Westerns in the 1940s.

== Biography ==
Cecile was born in Cincinnati, Ohio, to Arthur Lewis and Bertha Davis. She assumed her stepfather Edward Kramer's last name when her mother remarried. The family moved west and settled in Los Angeles by the time Cecile and her half-sister Bertha were teenagers. By the 1940s, she was writing film scripts; one of her earliest sales was a Hopalong Cassidy script she co-wrote with Ellen Corby. Most of the films she wrote or co-wrote were penned for Harry Sherman's independent production company.

== Selected filmography ==
- Hoppy's Holiday (1947)
- Ramrod (1947)
- Buffalo Bill (1944)
- Silver Queen (1942)
- Twilight on the Trail (1941)
