= Untamed Women =

1952 film

- Theatrical release poster
- Directed by: W. Merle Connell
- Written by: George Wallace Sayre
- Produced by: Richard Kay
- Starring: Mikel Conrad; Doris Merrick
- Edited by: W Merle Connell
- Music by: Raoul Kraushaar
- Distributed by: Jewell Enterprises/United Artists
- Release date: September 12, 1952
- Running time: 70 Minutes
- Country: USA
- Language: English

Untamed Women is a 1952 independently made American science fiction film, directed by W. Merle Connell, written by George Wallace Sayre, and starring Mikel Conrad and Doris Merrick. It was distributed by United Artists.

== Plot ==
An American bomber pilot in World War II, Steve Holloway, is rescued by a U.S. Navy flying boat after drifting at sea in a liferaft. When he awakens from a coma at a military hospital, he tells his doctors how his copilot died when he and three of his crew members, Benny, Andy, and Ed, crashed following a bombing mission. The survivors use a liferaft to finally reach an unknown island after being adrift for eight days.

The island is inhabited by prehistoric dinosaurs and reptiles and a tribe of Amazons, who are cavewomen descended from Druids. The Amazons are being plagued by Neanderthal men intent on kidnapping and mating with them. The Neanderthals had previously killed all of the Amazons' men, and they fear the aircrew to be in league with "the hairy men".

Steve tries to explain the aircrew's predicament, but hearing that they were fighting a war further convinces the Amazon's leader, Sandra, of the aircrew's ill intent. However, Sandra later frees the men from their cave cell without telling her followers.

The men follow Sandra's recommended escape route but encounter giant bison, prehistoric creatures, and flesh eating plants. Realizing their chances for survival are slim, they return to the Amazons. During their journey back, they are attacked by a giant armadillo (a Glyptodont), but the Amazons come to their aid just in time. Myra, Valdra, Tennus, and Cleo reveal that the aircrew's release was not a friendly act but Sandra's attempt for the indigenous animals and plants to dispose of the four men.

The Neanderthals attack, killing Ed, and the remainder of the aircrew use their pistols to kill them or drive them away. Steve recommends Benny and Andy leave the island in the liferaft. He takes the Amazons to their mountain temple from which they can better defend themselves. Benny and Andy refuse to leave Steve, knowing that the Neanderthals are preparing for another attack, while little of their ammunition remains. The mountain is actually a volcano which suddenly and violently erupts, killing Benny, Andy, and the Amazons. Steve barely makes it back to the liferaft before escaping as the eruption consumes the island.

Despite giving Holloway a serum to restore his speech, the doctors at the hospital find his adventure incredible. When they closely examine the medallion that Sandra gave Holloway, its design proves its Druidic origin, verifying his story.

== Cast ==
- Mikel Conrad as Steve Holloway
- Doris Merrick as Sandra
- Richard Monahan as Benny
- Mark Lowell as Ed
- Morgan Jones as Andy
- Midge Ware as Myra
- Judy Brubaker as Valdra
- Carol Brewster as Tennus
- Autumn Russell as Cleo (as Autumn Rice)
- Lyle Talbot as Col. Loring
- Montgomery Pittman as Prof. Warren
- Miriam Kaylor as Nurse Edmunds

== Production ==
Filmed in just a week, the film's creature special effects were lifted from the earlier Hal Roach Studios film, One Million BC (1940). The volcanic eruption sequence was reused special effects stock footage.

== Reception ==
Writing in AllMovie, critic Sandra Brennan reported "with dialogue such as 'Shoot anything with hair that moves' and movie posters promising 'Savage beauties who feared no animal...yet fell before the touch of men,' you just know you're in for an evening of good campy '50s-style fun." Critic Dave Sindelar wrote that the film "features Lyle Talbot, a wisecracking kid from Brooklyn, a volcano, and one of those phantom hairdressers hidden in a cave somewhere to keep the women looking their best," and that "the movie [is] delectable to those with a taste for such things, especially if I mention that it throws in a slurpasaur for good measure." A review of the film in TV Guide found that its quality reflected its minuscule budget and short production time. The Encyclopedia of Science Fiction described the film as mediocre.

In 1986 the film was featured in an episode of the Canned Film Festival.
