= Station West =

1948 film by Sidney Lanfield

- Theatrical release poster
- Directed by: Sidney Lanfield
- Screenplay by: Frank Fenton; Winston Miller
- Based on: Station West; 1947 novel by Luke Short
- Produced by: Robert Sparks
- Starring: Dick Powell; Jane Greer; Agnes Moorehead; Burl Ives
- Cinematography: Harry J. Wild
- Edited by: Frederic Knudtson
- Music by: Heinz Roemheld
- Production company: RKO Pictures
- Distributed by: RKO Pictures
- Release date: October 19, 1948 (premiere-Chicago)
- Running time: 87 minutes
- Country: United States
- Language: English
- Box office: $1.7 million (US rentals)

Station West is a 1948 American Western film directed by Sidney Lanfield and based on a Western novel by Luke Short. Burl Ives plays a small role and sings the following songs on the soundtrack: "A Stranger in Town," "The Sun's Shining Warm," and "A Man Can't Grow Old."

== Plot ==
Two soldiers have been robbed and murdered while guarding a shipment of gold. Into town rides Haven (Dick Powell), a military intelligence officer traveling incognito. When he rides into town, the hotel clerk (Burl Ives) is sitting at the front desk, playing his guitar and singing "a man can't grow old where there's women and gold," segueing the lyrics into a clear warning to leave town.

A beautiful saloon singer (Jane Greer) catches Haven's eye. After he meets Mrs. Caslon (Agnes Moorehead), who owns the gold mine, Haven hears that someone called "Charlie" is the brains behind the scene. He finds out to his surprise that Charlie is the singer.

Charlie's lawyer, Bristow (Raymond Burr), is $6,000 in her debt and therefore might be involved in the gold theft. Haven beats up Charlie's saloon bouncer in a fight and is offered a job as transport chief for the gold. Charlie's friend, Prince (Gordon Oliver), meanwhile, is growing jealous of her interest in Haven.

While transporting a shipment of gold, the man riding shotgun, Goddard (Regis Toomey), is killed and Haven knocked cold. When he comes to, he manages to track, catch and kill the robber carrying the gold. He shoos away the dead man's horses and follows them to their home stable, at the sawmill owned by Charlie. Haven pretends to be an ignorant hand working for Charlie, and is tasked with transporting the stolen gold in the horses' saddlebags back to town to Charlie and Prince.

He hides the gold, and confronts Prince and Charlie. After some to-ing and fro-ing with the gold and an affidavit dictated to Bristow by Haven, Charlie convinces Bristow that he ought to confront Haven. Haven convinces him rather that he is the next target of Prince and Charlie as he knows too much. Bristow, terrified, tries to get away but is shot by Prince. Haven is pinned down, but after persuading the sheriff to arrest him for the crime, Haven escapes, and learns that Charlie's men plan to disguise themselves as soldiers to steal more of Mrs. Caslon's gold.

He foils this plot, then arrives back at the saloon, to arrest Charlie, but also because he is in love with her. Prince sneaks up intending to shoot Haven, but his bullet hits Charlie instead. Haven kills Prince. Before she dies, Charlie tells Haven that she loves him, and Haven confesses his love for her.

Haven rides away as Burl Ives sings "a man can't grow old where there's women and gold."

== Cast ==
- Dick Powell as Haven
- Jane Greer as Charlie
- Agnes Moorehead as Mrs. Caslon
- Burl Ives as Hotel Clerk/Balladeer
- Tom Powers as Capt. George Isles
- Gordon Oliver as Prince
- Steve Brodie as 2nd Lt. Stellman
- Guinn Williams as Mick Marion
- Raymond Burr as Mark Bristow
- Regis Toomey as Jim Goddard
- Olin Howland as Cook
- John Berkes as Pianist
- Michael Steele as Jerry
- Dan White as Pete
- John Kellogg as Ben
- Charles Middleton as Sheriff
- Stanley Blystone as Bouncer (uncredited)
- Ethan Laidlaw as Townsman (uncredited)
- John Doucette as Bartender (uncredited)

== Accolades ==
- Writers Guild of America: Best Written American Western - Frank Fenton and Winston Miller; 1949.
