= Fast Company (1938 film) =

1938 film by Edward Buzzell

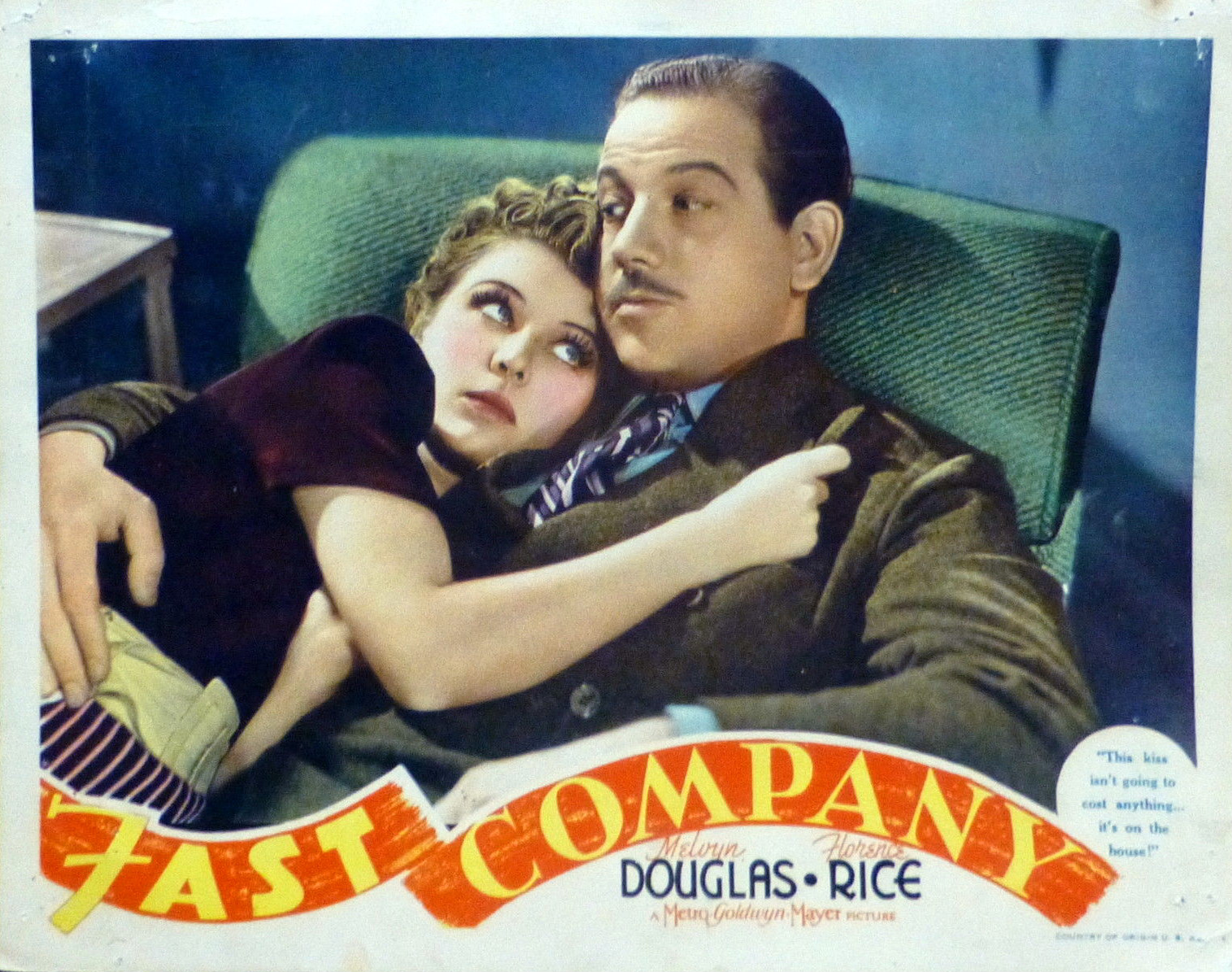
- Lobby card
- Directed by: Edward Buzzell
- Written by: Harry Kurnitz; Harold Tarshis
- Based on: Fast Company; 1938 novel by Marco Page
- Produced by: Frederick Stephani
- Starring: Melvyn Douglas; Florence Rice; Claire Dodd
- Cinematography: Clyde De Vinna
- Edited by: Fredrick Y. Smith
- Music by: William Axt
- Production company: Metro-Goldwyn-Mayer
- Distributed by: Loew's Inc.
- Release date: July 8, 1938
- Running time: 75 minutes
- Country: United States
- Language: English

Fast Company is a 1938 American mystery film directed by Edward Buzzell and starring Melvyn Douglas and Florence Rice as married rare-book dealers who try to solve a murder case. It is based on the novel of the same name by Marco Page (a pen name of Harry Kurnitz). It was followed by two 1939 films featuring the fictional couple, Fast and Loose and Fast and Furious, although different actors played the leads in each of the three films. To avoid confusion with a 1953 MGM film of the same title, Fast Company was retitled Rare Book Murder for television.

== Plot ==
Joel and Garda Sloane run a rare book business in New York City. To supplement their meager income, Joel recovers stolen books. Insurance man Steve Langner drops off a check for his latest success. The couple also tries to help Ned Morgan, recently released from prison, find a job; they do not believe he was guilty of the theft of books from dealer Otto Brockler. Ned is in love with Brockler's daughter Leah and wants to marry her, which Brockler staunchly forbids.

Eli Bannerman barges into Otto's office, despite the best efforts of secretary Julia Thorne. Otto is not pleased to see his business associate. He warns Eli that Joel is snooping around, but reluctantly agrees to take another shipment of fake first editions created by Sid Wheeler for $5000. Eli tells Sid that Otto only paid $2000. Incensed, Sid insists on going to see Otto to complain.

That night, Otto is struck with a bust sitting on his desk and killed. Ned is the main suspect, especially since he was seen entering the office around the time of the murder.

When Sid suggests that Eli might have killed Otto, Eli slugs him. Sid produces a gun, ends their partnership and takes Eli's wallet, full of cash.

Joel begins seeing Julia, pretending to be attracted to her in order to try to obtain information. Julia eventually tells him about a secret compartment in the office which holds the books Ned supposedly stole, but Ned is arrested before Joel can notify the police.

Meanwhile, Eli convinces Sid that Joel is after him, sure that he is the murderer. Sid shoots at Joel on the sidewalk, but Joel is only hit in the buttocks. Later, Eli kills Sid and takes back his money.

Then he hires Danny Scolado and Paul Terison to murder Joel. The two knock Joel out, but do not kill him right away; instead, they tie him up and stash him at a hideout. Having seen how concerned Eli was, Danny talks him into paying more money. In the meantime, Joel frees himself and knocks Paul out. When Danny and Eli return, they spot Garda following them and take her prisoner. Joel is forced to give up his gun, but Garda manages to disconnect the lamp. In the confusion, Eli gets away, while the police arrive and take Danny and Paul into custody.

Joel then goes to confront Julia. He has figured out that she killed her boss. Eli shows up with a pistol, but Joel manages to wrestle it away from him and hands him and Julia over to the police.

== Cast ==
- Melvyn Douglas as Joel Sloan
- Florence Rice as Garda Sloan
- Claire Dodd as Julia Thorne
- Shepperd Strudwick as Ned Morgan
- Louis Calhern as Elias "Eli" Bannerman
- Nat Pendleton as Paul Terison
- Douglass Dumbrille as Arnold Stamper, Ned's lawyer
- Mary Howard as Leah Brockler
- George Zucco as Otto Brockler
- Minor Watson as Steve Langner
- Donald Douglas as Lieutenant James Flanner
- Dwight Frye as Sidney "Sid" Wheeler
- Horace McMahon as Danny Scolado (as Horace MacMahon)

== Reception ==
In a contemporary review for The New York Times, critic Frank S. Nugent called Fast Company "a brash and amusing detective story of the lighthearted, or 'Thin Man,' school" and concluded: "Although we can't quite accept Mr. Mayer's marquee estimate, 'the year's best murder mystery,' we'll meet him part way. Call it one of the best."

Critic Whitney Williams of the Hollywood Citizen-News wrote: "There is a tempo about 'Fast Company' that swings the spectator along to happy nonchalance. The picture teems with witty dialog, and action rides abreast the lines. The mystery is so well worked out that never once do you suspect the murderer until the last few feet of film, and in attaining this rare estate the production never permits popular interest to be diverted."
