= Silver Queen =

1942 film

- Theatrical poster
- Directed by: Lloyd Bacon
- Screenplay by: Cecile Kramer; Bernard Schubert
- Story by: Forrest Halsey; William Allen Johnston
- Produced by: Harry Sherman
- Starring: George Brent; Priscilla Lane
- Cinematography: Russell Harlan
- Edited by: Sherman A. Rose
- Music by: Victor Young
- Production company: United Artists
- Distributed by: United Artists
- Release date: November 13, 1942
- Running time: 80 minutes
- Country: United States
- Language: English

Silver Queen is a 1942 American Western film directed by Lloyd Bacon and starring George Brent and Priscilla Lane. The film was nominated for two Academy Awards; one for Best Score and one for Best Art Direction (Ralph Berger, Emile Kuri).

== Plot ==
After discovering her father has gone broke from the Crash of the Stock Market, a well-known and confident young woman, Coralie, from the Barbary Coast decides to give up her chance at love in order to succeed in card games. She becomes a popular card dealer named the "Silver Queen".

Coralie Adams is torn between James Kincade, the dapper gambler she admires, and Gerald Forsythe, the responsible man her father has chosen for her to marry. But when her father loses the deed to a silver mine in a poker game, she leaves all that behind, relying on her own skill with cards and gambling to pay way and her family's debts. She starts a successful new life as the Silver Queen running her own gambling hall but the past returns and she is once again caught between her finance and the gambler.

== Cast ==
- George Brent as James Kincaid
- Priscilla Lane as Coralie Adams
- Bruce Cabot as Gerald Forsythe
- Lynne Overman as Hector Bailey
- Eugene Pallette as Steve Adams
- Janet Beecher as Mrs. Laura Forsythe
- Guinn 'Big Boy' Williams as Blackie
- Frederick Burton as Dr. Hartley
- Spencer Charters as Doc Stonebraker
- Eleanor Stewart as Millicent Bailey
- Georges Renavent as Andres
- Marietta Canty as Ruby
- Sam McDaniel as Toby
- Herbert Rawlinson as Judge
- Arthur Hunnicutt as Newspaper Publisher Brett
- Francis X. Bushman as Creditor
- Jason Robards Sr. as Bank Teller (uncredited)
- Fred Toones as Butler (uncredited)
