= Bradley King =

Bradley King may refer to:

- Bradley King (screenwriter) (1894–1977), pen name of Josephine McLaughlin, American screenwriter
- Bradley King (filmmaker), American film director and screenwriter, fl. 2004–present
- Bradley King (lighting designer), American theatrical lighting designer
- William Bradley-King (born 1997), American football player

== See also ==
- Brad King (disambiguation)
