= Blood on the Moon =

1948 film by Robert Wise

- Theatrical release poster
- Directed by: Robert Wise
- Screenplay by: Lillie Hayward; Harold Shumate
- Based on: Gunman's Chance; 1941 novel by Luke Short
- Produced by: Theron Warth
- Starring: Robert Mitchum; Barbara Bel Geddes; Robert Preston; Walter Brennan
- Cinematography: Nicholas Musuraca
- Edited by: Samuel E. Beetley
- Music by: Roy Webb
- Distributed by: RKO Radio Pictures
- Release date: November 9, 1948 (United States)
- Running time: 88 minutes
- Country: United States
- Language: English
- Budget: $1.5 million
- Box office: $2.4 million (US rentals)

Blood on the Moon is a 1948 RKO black-and-white "psychological" Western film noir starring Robert Mitchum, Barbara Bel Geddes, Robert Preston, and Walter Brennan. Directed by Robert Wise, the cinematography is by Nicholas Musuraca. The movie was shot mostly in California, and some of the more scenic shots were shot at Red Rock Crossing, Sedona, Arizona. The picture is based on the novel Gunman's Chance by Luke Short.

== Plot ==
Cowboy drifter Jim Garry is summoned by his friend, smooth-talking Tate Riling. Garry rides into an Indian reservation and finds himself in the middle of a conflict between a cattle owner and some homesteaders. He meets cattle owner John Lufton, who asks Garry to deliver a note to his family. While delivering the message, Garry is confronted by Lufton's daughter Amy, and eventually meets his other daughter, Carol. The Luftons suspect that Garry is on Riling's side and are initially hostile, especially Amy. Riling tells Garry that his partner, Indian agent Jake Pindalest, and he have devised an elaborate scheme to force Lufton into selling his herd cheaply.

Pindalest has rejected Lufton's cattle as unfit to feed the Indians and ordered him to remove his herd from the reservation within a week. Meanwhile, Riling has organized the homesteaders into blocking the move, conning them into believing that he is working in their interest. With no other option, Lufton would have to sell his herd at bargain prices or lose everything. Lufton would never sell to Riling, but he would to a stranger like Garry. Pindalest would then see that the government buys the herd. Riling offers Garry $10,000 for his part in the swindle.

Lufton manages to outsmart Riling and move his herd off the reservation unimpeded. Amy and he assume incorrectly that Garry read the note, which described the route he wanted Riling to think he planned to take. Riling was actually tipped off by Lufton's other daughter, Carol, who is in love with Riling. Riling and his men find the cattle eventually and stampede them back onto the reservation. Not enough time is available to gather the herd together and move it. Garry becomes disgusted when a young man is killed in the stampede. He breaks the news to the man's father, Kris Barden, as squarely as he can, but only receives scorn in return. He then stops two of Riling's men from gunning Lufton down, yet Amy still does not trust him. Friendless, Garry leaves town and heads for Texas, stopping at a commissary, miles out of town. There, he is ambushed by Riling and one of his gunmen. Garry and Riling end up in a brutal brawl, with Garry triumphing, but just barely. When Riling's thug goes to slay him, the man is shot dead by Barden, who tersely tells Garry to keep riding. Instead, he heads for the Lufton ranch, and is cared for by Amy, who has come to trust and fall in love with him.

To buy time for Lufton to get his cattle off the reservation, Garry deceives Pindalest (who is unaware of his break with Riling) into sending a messenger to the government to extend the deadline. Garry then takes Pindalest prisoner and hides in the mountains. Riling, after finding out that Garry tricked him, and his gang track them down. Garry is stabbed in the chest, but is able to flee to Barden's homestead, where they are joined by Amy. Riling, his two top henchmen, and Pindalest arrive, and a gunfight erupts. Garry insists Amy leave, for her own safety; she insists on staying to be with him. Rising from his sickbed, Garry sneaks out at night, covered by Kris and Amy. He knocks Pindalest out and slays the two gunmen. Riling is fatally wounded and dies. Come the morning, Garry and Amy recognize their future is together. Lufton and his men arrive, and Pindalest is taken into custody. Amy tells her father a new man is going to be in their household. Lufton declares it reason to celebrate, and they all head for Barden's jug.

== Cast ==
- Robert Mitchum as Jim Garry
- Barbara Bel Geddes as Amy Lufton
- Robert Preston as Tate Riling
- Walter Brennan as Kris Barden
- Phyllis Thaxter as Carol Lufton
- Frank Faylen as Jake Pindalest
- Tom Tully as John Lufton
- Charles McGraw as Milo Sweet

- Clifton Young as Joe Shotten
- Tom Tyler as Frank Reardon
- George Cooper as Fred Barden
- Tom Keene as Ted Elser
- Bud Osborne as Cap Willis
- Zon Murray as Nels Titterton
- Robert Bray as Bart Daniels

== Production ==
The idea for Blood on the Moon came from Robert Wise and Theron Warth, who pitched the project to producer Dore Schary as a mood piece akin to Out of the Past and Crossfire, both produced by RKO. Schary accepted and signed Lillie Hayward to write the screenplay, based on Luke Short's Gunman's Chance.

Talent agency Famous Artists offered RKO a deal with either James Stewart or Robert Mitchum in the leading role of Jim Garry, and Jacques Tourneur as director; Schary accepted Mitchum, but stuck with Wise. Wise enjoyed working with Mitchum and liked that he offered suggestions. When Mitchum showed up to the set dressed up in costume, Walter Brennan exclaimed: "That is the realest god damnedest cowboy I've ever seen!"

Filming began in February 1948, with Sedona, Arizona, the Rocky Mountains, California, Utah, and New Mexico serving as locations, and ended in May. Inspired by the production design of Citizen Kane (which he had co-edited), Wise had the interior sets built with visible low ceilings. To create the night scenes of the film, Wise and cinematographer Nicholas Musuraca used infrared film, requiring care with color of clothing and tone of makeup.

The bar fight between Garry and Rilling took three days to shoot. Wise wanted a realistic fight, where the winner comes out on top badly beaten and exhausted, instead of the usual Western brawls, and had Mitchum and Preston do the fight instead of stunt doubles.

Production of the film dragged on due to bad weather, which according to Wise, defied every forecast. After the film was completed, Howard Hughes terminated Barbara Bel Geddes' contract with RKO, believing she was not sexy enough.

== Reception ==
=== Critical response ===
Period critical response was positive.

The New York Times gave the film a good review and lauded Robert Mitchum's acting and Lillie Hayward's screenplay:

...Blood on the Moon still stands out from run-of-the-range action dramas. The reason is obvious enough. This picture has a sound, sensible story to tell and, besides, it is well acted. Robert Mitchum carries the burden of the film and his acting is superior all the way...Lillie Hayward's screen play, taken from a novel by Luke Short, is solidly constructed and by not over-emphasizing Jim Garry's inherent honesty, she has permitted Mr. Mitchum to illuminate a character that is reasonable and most always interesting. The same can be said of the rancher's daughter, whom Miss Bel Geddes represents. Others who give worthy help include Walter Brennan, Mr. Preston, Phyllis Thaxter, Frank Faylen and Tom Tully. And a word should be said, too, for the direction by Robert Wise. A comparative newcomer to the directorial ranks, he has managed to keep the atmosphere of this leisurely paced film charged with impending violence.

The film was also reviewed favorably by Variety:

Blood on the Moon is a terse, tightly drawn Western drama. There's none of the formula approach to its story telling. Picture captures the crisp style used by Luke Short in writing his western novels...Picture's pace has a false sense of leisureliness that points up several tough moments of action. There is a deadly knock-down and drag-out fist fight between Mitchum and Preston; a long chase across snow-covered mountains and the climax gun battle between Preston's henchmen and Mitchum, Brennan and Bel Geddes that are loaded with suspense wallop.

== Home media ==
Blood on the Moon was released on Blu-ray and DVD by the Warner Archive Collection in 2020.
