= Savage Range =

1938 novel by Luke Short

- Cover of the 1976 Dell edition
- Author: Luke Short (writer)
- Language: English
- Genre: Western fiction
- Publisher: Dell
- Publication date: 1938
- Publication place: United States
- Media type: Print (Paperback)
- Pages: 192
- ISBN: 0440179637

Savage Range (1938) is a Western novel written by Luke Short. The story is set in northern New Mexico, likely during the 19th century. Jim Wade is hired by Max Bonsell to drive the landgrabbers off the ranch. His aim is to complete the job using as little force as possible. But when his own employer frames him for a massacre of thirteen landgrabbers, Jim Wade becomes a fugitive with a lynch posse at his trail. He must stay alive to prove his innocence and get take revenge on his former boss.
