= Barbara Britton =

American actress (1920–1980)

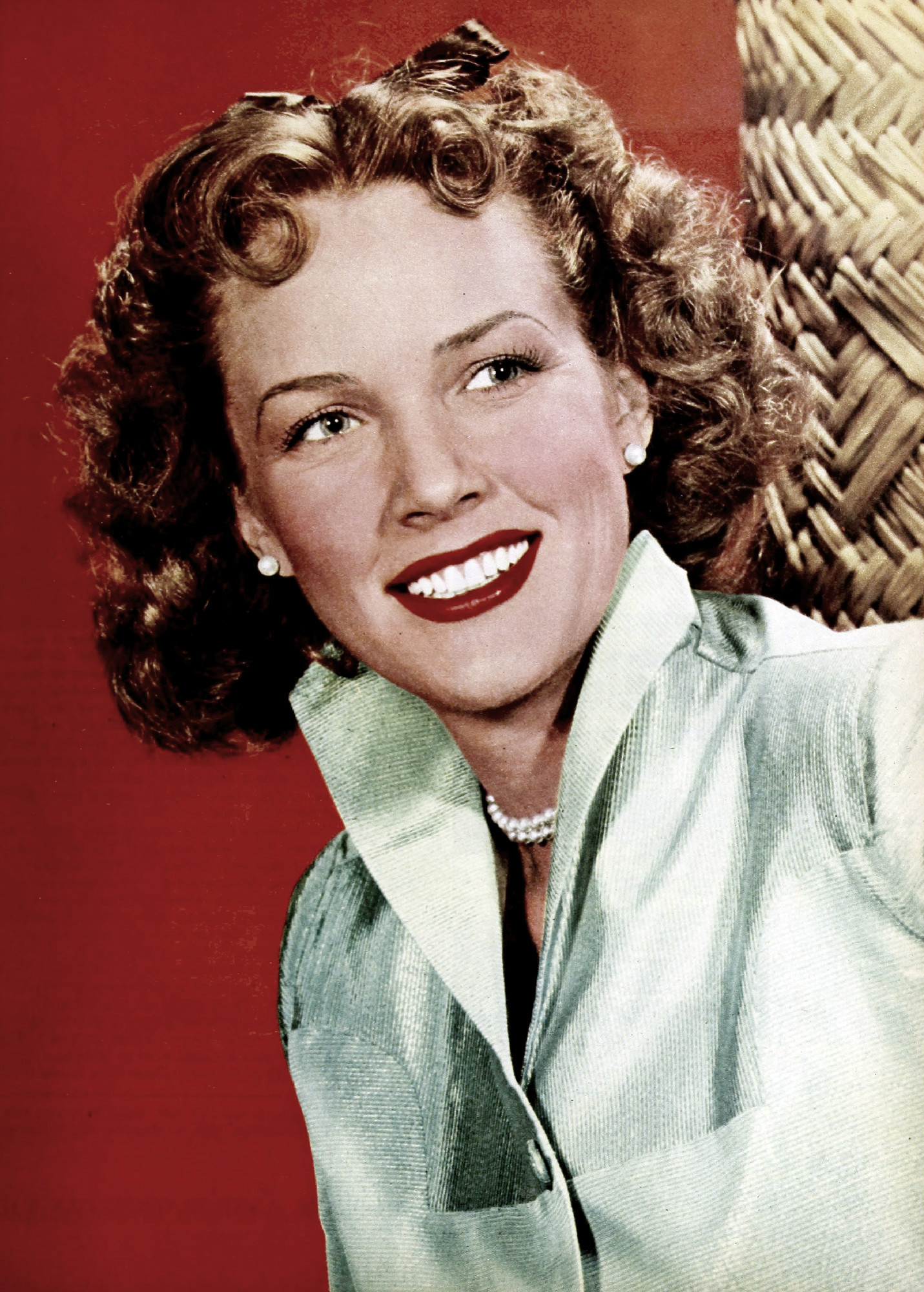
- Britton in 1953
- Born: Barbara Maurine Brantingham; September 26, 1920; Long Beach, California, U.S.
- Died: January 17, 1980 (aged 59); Manhattan, New York, U.S.
- Resting place: Woodlawn Cemetery Bronx
- Occupations: Actress, Mayor of Hollywood (1952)
- Years active: 1941–1980
- Spouse: Dr. Eugene Czukor (m. 1945)
- Children: 3

Barbara Britton (born Barbara Maurine Brantingham; September 26, 1920 – January 17, 1980) was an American film and television actress. She is best known for her Western film roles opposite Randolph Scott, Joel McCrea, and Gene Autry and for her two-year tenure as inquisitive amateur sleuth Pam North on the television and radio series Mr. and Mrs. North.

== Early life ==
Britton was born September 26, 1920, in Long Beach, California. Her involvement with stage productions began when she was 14. She attended Polytechnic High School and Long Beach City College, majoring in speech with the intention of working as a speech and drama teacher. While in school, she began to show an interest in acting and working on local stage productions.

== Career ==
In 1941, while appearing in a Pasadena Tournament of Roses Parade, a photo of Britton was used on the front page of a local newspaper. A talent scout took notice, and she was soon signed to a Paramount Pictures contract. (Another source says that a talent scout spotted her as the lead in the production of The Old Maid at her college, and "three weeks later she was signed by Paramount Pictures as a stock player.")

=== Film ===
That same year, she appeared in her first two films: the William Boyd Western Secret of the Wastelands and Louisiana Purchase starring Bob Hope. Her first major film appearance was in a small role in the John Wayne film Reap the Wild Wind (1942). In 1944, she gave a very affecting performance with Ray Milland in Till We Meet Again.

During the 1940s Britton starred in three films for which she is most recognized, two of which co-starred Randolph Scott. The first was the 1945 film Captain Kidd with Scott, followed by The Virginian in 1946 opposite Joel McCrea. The third was the 1947 Randolph Scott film Gunfighters. She teamed with Scott again in the 1948 Western Albuquerque, and that same year she starred opposite Gene Autry in Loaded Pistols. In total, she starred or appeared in 26 films during that decade.

=== Television ===
Britton starred in the 1950s television show Mr. and Mrs. North, a Thin Man-like mystery show, with Richard Denning and Francis De Sales. She was probably best known for being the spokeswoman for Revlon products in the 1950s and 1960s, appearing in advertisements and commercials that included live spots on The $64,000 Question. She also portrayed Laura Petrie in Carl Reiner's Head of the Family, the 1959 pilot for the later Dick Van Dyke Show.

One of Britton's last roles was on the daytime television soap opera One Life to Live in 1979.

=== Magazines ===
Over a 24-month span, Britton's picture appeared on more than 100 magazine covers, including those of Ladies Home Journal, Woman's Home Companion, and McCall's. In 1949, a newspaper article reported, "Today, Barbara Britton's picture has appeared on more national magazine covers than any other motion picture actress in the world."

== Personal life ==
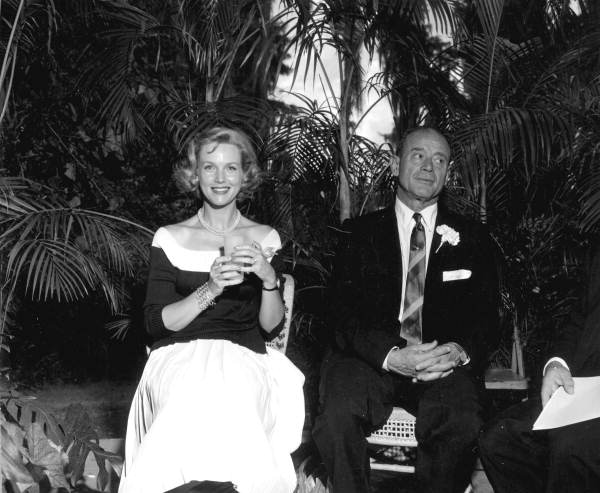
TV actress Barbara Britton at the Tupperware Jubilee - Orlando, Florida

Reportedly, in 1944, Britton suffered from nervous exhaustion due to overwork and was advised to seek the help of physician and psychoanalyst Dr. Eugene J. Czukor. Britton and Czukor, who was 23 years her senior, were married on April 2, 1945. At one time, the couple had a home on Victoria Drive in Laguna Beach, California. They moved to Manhattan in 1957. For many years, Britton and her husband lived in a rambling, red-shingled farmhouse in Bethel, Connecticut. Sharing their love of antiques, they opened a shop in an early American barn in the antique-gallery enclave of Woodbury, Connecticut. They had two children, Ted and Christina. Their marriage lasted for 34 years until Britton's death from pancreatic cancer on January 17, 1980, at the age of 59.

Britton was a Republican, and she campaigned for Dwight D. Eisenhower in both 1952 and 1956.

== Honors and awards ==
In 1948, Britton was given a key to the City of Long Beach, California. On February 8, 1960, she received a star for television on the Hollywood Walk of Fame; her star is located at 1719 Vine Street.

== Filmography ==
=== Films ===
- Secrets of the Wasteland (1941) - Jennifer Kendall
- Louisiana Purchase (1941) - Louisiana Belle
- The Fleet's In (1942) - Eileen Wright
- Reap the Wild Wind (1942) - Charleston Lady
- Beyond the Blue Horizon (1942) - Pamela, Girl at Circus (uncredited)
- Wake Island (1942) - Sally Cameron (uncredited)
- Mrs. Wiggs of the Cabbage Patch (1942) - Miss Lucy Olcott
- Freedom Comes High (1943, Short) - Ellen Blanding
- Young and Willing (1943) - Marge Benson Dennison
- So Proudly We Hail! (1943) - Lt. Rosemary Larson
- The Story of Dr. Wassell (1944) - Ruth
- Till We Meet Again (1944) - Sister Clothilde aka Louise Dupree
- The Great John L. (1945) - Kathy Harkness
- Captain Kidd (1945) - Lady Anne Dunstan
- The Virginian (1946) - Molly Wood
- They Made Me a Killer (1946) - June Reynolds
- The Fabulous Suzanne (1946) - Suzanne
- The Return of Monte Cristo (1946) - Angel Picard
- Gunfighters (1947) - Bess Banner
- Albuquerque (1948) - Letty Tyler
- Mr. Reckless (1948) - Betty Denton
- The Untamed Breed (1948) - Cherry Lucas
- Loaded Pistols (1948) - Mary Evans
- I Shot Jesse James (1949) - Cynthy
- Cover Up (1949) - Anita Weatherby
- Champagne for Caesar (1950) - Gwenn Bottomley
- The Bandit Queen (1950) - Zara Montalvo aka Lola Belmont
- The Raiders (1952) - Elizabeth Ainsworth
- Ride the Man Down (1952) - Lottie Priest
- Bwana Devil (1952) - Alice Hayward
- Dragonfly Squadron (1954) - Donna Cottrell
- Ain't Misbehavin' (1955) - Pat Beaton
- Night Freight (1955) - Wanda
- The Spoilers (1955) - Helen Chester
- Majeok (1967)

=== Television series ===
- Armstrong Circle Theatre (1950–1951)
- Pulitzer Prize Playhouse (1951)
- Lux Video Theatre (1951) - Hilda
- Lights Out (1951)
- Cameo Theatre (1951)
- Schlitz Playhouse (1952) - Pamela
- Mr. and Mrs. North (1952–1954) - Pamela North / Kitty Pomeroy
- Danger (1954)
- Climax! (1955) - Duana Clarke
- Appointment with Adventure (1955)
- Robert Montgomery Presents (1950–1955) - Liz
- The Christophers (1955)
- The Ford Television Theatre (1955) - Alice / Kathy Collins
- Head of the Family (Pilot for what would become The Dick Van Dyke Show) (1959)
- The Comedy Spot (1960) - Laura Petrie
- One Life to Live (1968) - Fran Craig Gordon #1 (1979-1980) (final appearance)

=== Radio ===
- Stars in the Air (1952) Episode: Weekend for Three
- Mr. and Mrs. North (1953-1955)
