= Ralph Berger =

American art director

- Born: August 20, 1904; Los Angeles, California
- Died: December 12, 1960 (aged 56); Los Angeles, California
- Occupation: Art director
- Years active: 1932-1960

Ralph Berger (August 20, 1904 – December 12, 1960) was an American art director. He was nominated an Academy Award in the category Best Art Direction for the film Silver Queen. He was born and died in Los Angeles, California.

== Selected filmography ==
- White Zombie (1932)
- Silver Queen (1942)
