= Silver City (1951 film) =

1951 film by Byron Haskin

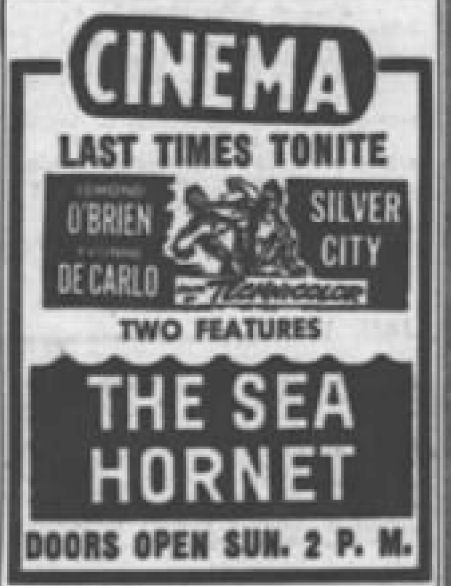
- Newspaper advertisement
- Directed by: Byron Haskin
- Screenplay by: Frank Gruber
- Based on: High Vermilion (1947 novel) by Luke Short
- Produced by: Nat Holt
- Starring: Edmond O'Brien; Yvonne De Carlo; Barry Fitzgerald
- Cinematography: Ray Rennahan
- Edited by: Elmo Billings
- Music by: Paul Sawtell
- Color process: Technicolor
- Production company: Nat Holt Productions
- Distributed by: Paramount Pictures
- Release date: December 20, 1951 (Los Angeles)
- Running time: 91 minutes
- Country: United States
- Language: English
- Box office: $1 million (U.S. rentals)

Silver City is a 1951 American Western film directed by Byron Haskin and starring Edmond O'Brien, Yvonne De Carlo and Barry Fitzgerald.

The screenplay was adapted from the 1947 novel High Vermilion by Luke Short and the film released under that title in the United Kingdom.

== Plot ==
When the mining office of Charlie Storrs is robbed by two bandits, his right-hand man Larkin Moffatt chases them. Moffatt finds the bandits but then rides away, never to return. Charlie is furious, fires Moffatt and spreads the word that Moffatt cannot be trusted. Charlie's wife Josephine had previously been Larkin's woman.

Moffatt settles in the town of Silver City, where he is not known, and opens a mining assayer's office. Candace Surrency is pleased when Moffatt confirms the value of the ore sample that she has brought to him, but distressed because her father Dutch is losing mineral rights to his mine to the rich and wealthy R.R. Jarboe.

Candace's foreman is beaten by Jarboe's henchman. She tries to hire Moffatt, but he declines. Charlie and Josephine arrive in town, curious about Silver City mining opportunities. They are shocked to find Moffatt here. It soon becomes clear that Josephine only married Charlie for money rather than love.

Charlie helps turn Jarboe against Moffatt. Jarboe's men sabotage the mine. Candace continues to plead for Moffatt's help, but he resists. He explains that he participated in the robbery in order to acquire money for greedy Josephine, but his guilty conscience forced him to leave and not spend the stolen loot. He accepts Candace's offer to become her foreman after becoming angry that his office has been ransacked by Jarboe and his men.

In a final gunfight at a sawmill, Charlie saves Moffatt from being shot by one of Jarboe's henchmen, whom he shoots. Charlie is then shot in the back by another of Jarboe's men who arrived after murdering Jarboe because he wanted Jarboe's operation for himself. Moffatt seizes Charlie's gun and kills the other henchman. The two former partners speak briefly before Charlie dies.

Moffatt kisses Candace outside the Surrency home as Dutch enters the house to leave them alone.

== Cast ==
- Edmond O'Brien as Larkin Moffatt
- Yvonne De Carlo as Candace Surrency
- Barry Fitzgerald as R.R. Jarboe
- Richard Arlen as Charles Storrs
- Gladys George as Mrs. Barber
- Kasey Rogers as Josephine Storrs (as Laura Elliot)
- Edgar Buchanan as Dutch Currency
- Michael Moore as Bill Taff
- John Dierkes as Arnie
- Billy House as Tim Malone (uncredited)

== Production ==
The film is based on the 1947 novel High Vermillion by Luke Short, which was reprinted in 1949 as Hands Off. In February 1951, the film rights to the book were bought by producer Nat Holt, who hired Frank Gruber to write a script.

Rhonda Fleming was originally announced as Edmond O'Brien's costar, but by late March 1951, Yvonne De Carlo signed to play the female lead.

Filming began on April 30, 1951.

== Reception ==
In a contemporary review for the Los Angeles Times, critic Grace Kingsley wrote: "While westerns are not usually mystery stories, spectators may find certain baffling elements when they try to figure out some spots in the plot of 'Silver City' ... However, most are crystal clear and there are heaps of novel and exciting incidents to keep one glued to his seat. Technicolor brings out the beauty in gals and other scenery."
