= Ramrod (film) =

1947 film by André de Toth

- Theatrical release poster
- Directed by: Andre de Toth
- Written by: Luke Short (story); Jack Moffitt; C. Graham Baker; Cecile Kramer
- Produced by: Harry Sherman
- Starring: Joel McCrea; Veronica Lake; Preston Foster; Don DeFore
- Cinematography: Russell Harlan
- Music by: Adolph Deutsch
- Production companies: Sherman Pictures; Enterprise
- Distributed by: United Artists (United States and Canada); Metro-Goldwyn-Mayer (International)
- Release date: May 2, 1947
- Running time: 95 minutes
- Language: English
- Budget: $1.5 million – $2 million
- Box office: $2 million

Ramrod is a 1947 American Western film directed by Andre de Toth and starring Joel McCrea, Veronica Lake, Preston Foster and Don DeFore. This cowboy drama from Hungarian director de Toth was the first of several films based on the stories of Western author Luke Short. De Toth's first Western is often compared to films noir released around the same time. Leading lady Veronica Lake was then married to director de Toth. The supporting cast features Donald Crisp, Charles Ruggles, Lloyd Bridges and Ray Teal.

== Plot ==
Connie Dickason is the strong-willed daughter of a ranch owner who is under the control of powerful local cattleman Frank Ivey, a man her father once wanted Connie to marry. Instead, Connie takes up with a sheep rancher who is run out of town by Ivey, leaving behind a note that he is handing the title of his ranch over to Connie.

The conniving and manipulative Connie persuades ranch hand Dave Nash to be her "ramrod," or ranch foreman. He recruits an old pal, Bill Schell, who bends the law to his own purposes now and then but is fiercely loyal to Dave, to come help him run the ranch and fend off the ruthless Ivey.

Rose Leland is in love with Dave and he feels great affection toward her. Connie seduces both Dave and Bill to do her bidding, however. She even persuades Bill to stampede her own cattle, without Dave's knowledge, just so Ivey will appear guilty to the law. Sheriff Jim Crew goes to arrest Ivey and is shot down in cold blood. Dave is ambushed by a couple of Ivey's men. He kills one of them, Red Cates, but is badly wounded. Bill hides him, but Connie carelessly exposes their hideout. Bill volunteers to distract Ivey and his men while Dave turns to Rose for shelter. Ivey hunts down Bill in the mountains and shoots him in the back.

Dave has had enough. He confronts Ivey in the street, armed with only a shotgun, but beats him to the draw. Connie is delighted. At last, she has her land and her man. Dave, though, wants nothing more to do with her, returning to Rose's arms.

== Cast ==
- Joel McCrea as Dave Nash
- Veronica Lake as Connie Dickason
- Don DeFore as Bill Schell
- Donald Crisp as Sheriff Jim Crew
- Preston Foster as Frank Ivey
- Arleen Whelan as Rose Leland
- Charles Ruggles as Ben Dickason
- Lloyd Bridges as Red Cates
- Nestor Paiva as Curley (Circle 66 hand)
- Ray Teal as Ed Burma
- Houseley Stevenson as George Smedley
- Robert Wood as Link Thomas
- Ian MacDonald as Walt Shipley
- Wally Cassell as Virg Lea
- Sarah Padden as Mrs. Parks
- Trevor Bardette as Bailey (uncredited)

== Production ==
It was the first film from the independent production company Enterprise and was Lake's first movie as a star outside Paramount. Per the AFI Catalog of Feature Films, production took place from late May to early August 1946. Shooting took place in Zion National Park and Grafton, Utah.

== Reception ==
=== Critical response ===
The film received a positive review from The New York Times, which said in summary "the director, scenarists and cast, many of whom are no strangers to this sort of emoting, have pitched in with him to make this horse opera a pleasant variation on a venerable theme."

Diabolique magazine says "the movie is a bit out of kilter – you have more sympathy for Lake, who has more at stake than McCrea, who is just a hired hand" and that "Ramrod isn't perfect but it is interesting, and it's fun to see Lake in a Western."

=== Box Office ===
According to Variety, the film earned $2 million, with a negative cost of $1.5 million. This made it one of the more successful films from the short-lived Enterprise Productions.
