= Loaded Pistols =

1948 film

- Theatrical release poster
- Directed by: John English
- Written by: Dwight Cummins; Dorothy Yost
- Produced by: Armand Schaefer
- Starring: Gene Autry; Barbara Britton; Chill Wills
- Cinematography: William Bradford
- Edited by: Aaron Stell
- Production company: Gene Autry Productions
- Distributed by: Columbia Pictures
- Release date: December 15, 1948 (U.S.)
- Running time: 79 minutes
- Country: United States
- Language: English

Loaded Pistols is a 1948 American Western film directed by John English and starring Gene Autry, Barbara Britton, and Chill Wills. Written by Dwight Cummins and Dorothy Yost, the film is about a cowboy who protects a young man wrongly accused of murder, while trying to find the real badguys.

== Plot ==
Following the death of his friend Ed Norton who was killed during a dice game, Gene Autry (Gene Autry) sets out in search of the killer. His search takes him to an old house where Larry Evans (Russell Arms), who was accused of the murder, is in hiding. Larry's sister Mary (Barbara Britton) defends her brother, claiming they both loved Ed, who acted as their guardian after the death of their father. Mary is able to convince Gene that Larry is innocent. Gene offers to help him evade the sheriff until he can discover the real killer.

Later, Gene discovers that Larry's gun, which was used in the killing, was offered as collateral during the dice game, and anyone could have taken it and shot Ed when the lights in the room went out. To allude a posse, Gene takes Larry to a cabin belonging to his prospector friend, Jim Hedge (Clem Bevans). When Gene questions him about the game, Larry tells him that either Dave Randall (Jack Holt) or Don Mason (Robert Shayne), who were both playing in the game, suggested that he put up the gun. Gene rides back into town to continue his search for the real killer.

Meanwhile, Mason offers to purchase the Evans ranch from Mary and help Larry to escape across the border. Gene overhears the conversation and is surprised by the large amount of money Mason is proposing to pay for the property. When Gene returns to Jim's cabin, he is followed by the sheriff. Although Gene manages to warn Larry of the lawman's presence, Larry is convinced that Gene has betrayed him.

The following morning, Gene and Jim ride to the ranch where Larry is hiding. After a struggle, Larry realizes that Gene is on his side. Gene notices that Jim's compass is behaving strangely. He sets a trap for the killers and exposes Don Mason and his cohorts, Bill Otis and Dave Randall, who murdered Ed Norton in order to obtain the rich lode of iron ore on his ranch. Larry's name cleared, and he and his sister return to their ranch and its valuable iron ore.

== Cast ==
- Gene Autry as Gene Autry
- Barbara Britton as Mary Evans
- Chill Wills as Sheriff Cramer
- Jack Holt as Dave Randall
- Russell Arms as Larry Evans
- Robert Shayne as Don Mason
- Vince Barnett as Sam Gardner
- Leon Weaver as Jake Harper
- Fred Kohler Jr. as Randall's crony
- Clem Bevans as Jim Hedge
- Champion as Champ, Gene's Horse

== Production ==
=== Filming locations ===
- Alabama Hills, Lone Pine, California, USA
- Corriganville Movie Ranch, Ray Corrigan Ranch, Simi Valley, California, USA (exteriors)
- Iverson Ranch, 1 Iverson Lane, Chatsworth, Los Angeles, California, USA

=== Soundtrack ===
- "Loaded Pistols" (Johnny Lange, Hy Heath) by Gene Autry
- "When the Bloom is on the Sage" (Fred Howard, Nat Vincent) by Gene Autry
- "A Boy from Texas, a Girl from Tennessee" (Jack Segal, Joseph McCarthy, John Benson Brooks) by Gene Autry
- "Jimmy-Crack-Corn" (Daniel Decatur Emmett) by Gene Autry
- "Pretty Mary" (Gene Autry, Oakley Haldeman, James McDonald, Robert Mitchell) by Gene Autry

== See also ==
- Public domain film
- List of American films of 1948
- List of films in the public domain in the United States
