= Hank Henry =

American actor (1906–1981)

- Born: Henry Rosenthal; July 9, 1906; New York City, New York, U.S.
- Died: March 31, 1981 (aged 74); Las Vegas, Nevada, U.S.
- Occupations: Comedian, actor
- Years active: 1937–1970

Hank Henry (July 9, 1906 – March 31, 1981) was an American comedian, known for his stage work on the Las Vegas Strip for decades. He was also a film and television actor. Henry got his start in American burlesque and was the comic to the straight man Robert Alda, Alan Alda's father.

== Biography ==
Henry was born Henry Rosenthal in New York City; the son of Anna (née Richards), and Franklin Rosenthal. Henry's mother came from England, and his father was German-American descended from the Pennsylvania Dutch.

Hank Henry made his screen debut in 1937, in a comedy short, Dime a Dance, produced in New York by Educational Pictures. The film also featured up-and-coming performers Imogene Coca, Danny Kaye, June Allyson, and Barry Sullivan. It was a one-shot assignment, which Henry filmed during a burlesque engagement. Henry relocated to California and resumed his movie career in 1943. He acted in films such as This Is the Army, Junior Prom, The Joker Is Wild, Pal Joey, Ocean's 11, Pepe, the burlesque comedy Not Tonight Henry (in which Henry played all the leading male roles), Sergeants 3, Johnny Cool, Robin and the 7 Hoods, and The Only Game in Town. He was frequently cast opposite Frank Sinatra. Henry made his television debut in The Thin Man in the episode "The Case of the Baggy Pants" portrayed Noonan. Henry last appeared on television in 1970.

Henry died on March 31, 1981, in Las Vegas, Nevada, at the age of 74. He had suffered from cancer.

== Filmography ==
Year	Title	Role	Notes
1937	Dime a Dance	Homer	
1943	This Is the Army	Plumber - 'Ladies of Chorus' Number / Cigar-Smoker in Canteen	Uncredited
1946	Junior Prom	Tony	
1957	The Joker Is Wild	Burlesque comedian	
1957	Pal Joey	Mike Miggins	
1959	The Thin Man	Noonan	"The Case of the Baggy Pants" (1 episode)
1960	Ocean's 11	Mr. Kelly (mortician)	
1960	Pepe	Sands Manager	
1960	Not Tonight Henry	Henry / Napoleon / Samson / Marc Antony / Captain John Smith / Caveman	
1962	Sergeants 3	Blacksmith	
1963	Johnny Cool	Larry, the Bus Driver	
1964	Robin and the 7 Hoods	Six Seconds	
1970	The Only Game in Town	Tony	(final film role)
