= High Vermilion =

Western novel by Luke Short

- Author: Luke Short (writer)
- Language: English
- Genre: Western fiction
- Publisher: Collins
- Publication date: 11 March 1948
- Publication place: United States
- Media type: Print (Hardback)
- Pages: 217

High Vermilion (1948) is a Western novel written by the American author Luke Short. It is set in the mountains of Colorado in the fictional mining town of Vermilion. The book was later made into a film.

== Plot ==
Dutch Surrencey has a problem. An assay report tells him the mine he is leasing contains a pocket of rich silver ore that promises to make him rich. But the lease on the mine runs out in ten days and Dutch has barely enough time to extract the ore. Then the unscrupulous owner of the mine starts to sabotage his efforts. Larkin Moffatt, who conducted the assay, could help as he is also a skilled mining engineer. But he has a hidden past which comes to light when two new arrivals in town reveal his earlier misdeed. Will he run away, as he has before, or will he stay and help Dutch and his pretty daughter and lay the ghosts of his past to rest?

== Publication ==
An edited version of the story first appeared as a serial in the Saturday Evening Post In 1947. It was accompanied by illustrations by the artist Harold von Schmidt.

High Vermilion was published in its entirety by Collins in 1948. Since then multiple editions of the novel have appeared in the United States and the United Kingdom.

The book was reprinted in 1949 as Hands Off.

The story was filmed as Silver City (1951) starring Edmond O'Brien and Yvonne De Carlo. The film was released with the title of High Vermilion in Australia.
