= EMKA, Ltd. =

Division of Universal Television

- Founded: 1958; 68 years ago
- Parent: Universal Television

EMKA Limited is a company that is owned by the Universal Television division of NBCUniversal with the sole function of overseeing the copyrighted bulk of the pre-1949 Paramount Pictures sound feature film library, with some exceptions. It was founded in 1958.

== History ==
In February 1958, nine years after the ruling of the United States v. Paramount Pictures, Inc. case in 1948, Music Corporation of America (MCA) approached Paramount to acquire the television distribution rights to 750 sound feature films released prior to December 1, 1949, for $10 million, with payment to be spread over a period of several years. Paramount saw this as a bargain since the studio saw very little value in its library of old films at the time. To address any antitrust concerns, MCA set up EMKA, Ltd. as a dummy corporation to sell these films to television. EMKA's Paramount library includes the first five Marx Brothers films (although it took until 1974 for rights issues to be cleared for Animal Crackers before it could legally be shown again), the first four Bob Hope–Bing Crosby Road to... pictures, and other classics such as Trouble in Paradise, Shanghai Express, She Done Him Wrong, Remember the Night, Sullivan's Travels, The Palm Beach Story, For Whom The Bell Tolls, Double Indemnity, Going My Way, The Lost Weekend, and The Heiress.

Over the years, MCA took in more than a billion dollars in rentals of these supposedly "worthless" films. In 1962, MCA purchased the US branch of Decca Records, then the parent company of Universal Pictures, and subsequently divested MCA of the talent agency business. MCA was eventually acquired by Japan-based Matsushita Electric in 1990 and then by Seagram in 1995, renamed as Universal Studios in 1996 which was sold to Vivendi in 2000. In 1997, Universal Television was sold to Barry Diller-founded USA Networks, 5 years later on May 28, 2002, its entertainment assets were sold to Vivendi Universal. In 2004, Vivendi, merged its entertainment division with General Electric's NBC to form NBCUniversal. In 2011, Comcast bought 51% of NBC Universal from Vivendi and renamed it NBCUniversal, and in 2013, Comcast bought the remaining 49% of NBCUniversal from GE.

== Library ==
EMKA's current library includes:

- Paramount Pictures film library [pre-1949 titles under copyright, excluding Dr. Jekyll and Mr. Hyde, owned by Warner Bros. via Turner Entertainment Co., The Story of Temple Drake, owned by Disney via 20th Century Studios, and six Paramount films (The Buccaneer, The Miracle of Morgan's Creek, Sorry, Wrong Number, Bride of Vengeance, Rope of Sand, and My Friend Irma), owned by Paramount itself]
  - State of the Union (1948, originally released by Metro-Goldwyn-Mayer, acquired by Paramount from Liberty Films in 1947)

== Current status ==
EMKA continues to exist as a division of Universal Television with Universal holding theatrical and home video distribution rights, while NBCUniversal Syndication Studios holding television distribution rights. Some of EMKA's films were remade by Universal in later years such as Meet Joe Black, a remake of Death Takes a Holiday, and a few other films became adapted by Revue Studios as television series.
