= Harry Kurnitz =

American playwright, novelist and screenwriter (1908–1968)

- Born: January 5, 1908; New York City, United States
- Died: March 18, 1968 (aged 60); Los Angeles, California, U.S.
- Resting place: Beth Olam Cemetery
- Education: University of Pennsylvania
- Occupations: Playwright; novelist; screenwriter
- Spouse: Eileen Tatlock-Miller (m. 1941–1944)
- Writing career
- Pen name: Marco Page
- Language: English

Harry Kurnitz (January 5, 1908 – March 18, 1968) was an American playwright, novelist, and screenwriter who wrote swashbucklers for Errol Flynn and comedies for Danny Kaye. He also wrote some mystery fiction under the name Marco Page.

== Early years ==
Kurnitz grew up in Philadelphia and attended the University of Pennsylvania. He entered journalism as a book and music reviewer for The Philadelphia Record in 1930. In his spare time he wrote mystery fiction as Marco Page.

== Writing career ==
A mystery story Kurnitz wrote in 1937, Fast Company, about skulduggery in the rare-book business, led him to Hollywood. Metro-Goldwyn-Mayer bought the book, and Kurnitz wrote the screenplay. Kurnitz wrote more than forty movie scripts, among them Witness for the Prosecution; What Next, Corporal Hargrove?; and How to Steal a Million.

His first play was Reclining Figure, a 1954 comedy about painters and their patrons and the tricks of the dealers and collectors who prey on them. Later, Kurnitz wrote the comedy Once More, with Feeling!. Other plays included High Fidelity and The Girl Who Came to Supper, a musical he wrote with Noël Coward, who composed the music and lyrics.

== Death ==
On March 18, 1968, Kurnitz died of a heart attack. At the time of his death he was working on a detective story.

== Partial filmography ==
- Fast Company (1938)
- Fast and Loose (1939)
- Fast and Furious (1939)
- I Love You Again (1940)
- Shadow of the Thin Man (1941)
- Ship Ahoy (1942)
- Pacific Rendezvous (1942)
- They Got Me Covered (1943)
- See Here, Private Hargrove (1944)
- The Heavenly Body (1944)
- The Thin Man Goes Home (1945)
- What Next, Corporal Hargrove? (1945)
- The Web (1947)
- Something in the Wind (1947)
- One Touch of Venus (1948)
- Adventures of Don Juan (1948)
- A Kiss in the Dark (1949)
- My Dream Is Yours (1949)
- The Inspector General (1949)
- Pretty Baby (1950)
- Tonight We Sing (1953)
- Melba (1953)
- The Man Between (1953)
- The Love Lottery (1954)
- Land of the Pharaohs (1955)
- The Happy Road (1957)
- Silk Stockings (1957)
- Witness for the Prosecution (1957)
- Once More, with Feeling! (1960)
- Surprise Package (1960)
- Hatari! (1962)
- Goodbye Charlie (1964)
- How to Steal a Million (1966)
