= Smoky Mountain Melody =

1948 film by Ray Nazarro

- Directed by: Ray Nazarro
- Written by: Barry Shipman
- Produced by: Colbert Clark
- Starring: Roy Acuff; Guinn 'Big Boy' Williams; Russell Arms; Sybil Merritt; Tommy Ivo; Jason Robards Sr.
- Cinematography: Rex Wimpy
- Edited by: Paul Borofsky
- Production company: Columbia Pictures
- Distributed by: Columbia Pictures
- Release date: December 16, 1948
- Running time: 62 minutes
- Country: United States
- Language: English

Smoky Mountain Melody is a 1948 American musical Western film directed by Ray Nazarro, and starring Roy Acuff, Guinn 'Big Boy' Williams, Russell Arms, Sybil Merritt, Tommy Ivo, and Jason Robards Sr. The film was released by Columbia Pictures on December 16, 1948.

== Cast ==
- Roy Acuff as himself
- Guinn 'Big Boy' Williams as Saddle Grease Williams
- Russell Arms as Bruce 'Kid' Corby
- Sybil Merritt as Mary Files
- Tommy Ivo as Tommy Durkin
- Jason Robards Sr. as Josh Corby
- Harry Cheshire as Doc Moffitt
- Fred F. Sears as Mr. Crump
- Trevor Bardette as Uncle McCorkle
- Tommy Magness as Musician
- Jock Mahoney as Buckeye
- Lonnie Wilson as Musician
- John Elliott as Englesby
- Ralph Littlefield as Masters
- Sam Flint as Brandon
- Eddie Acuff as Jenkins
- Jack Ellis as Jones
- Heinie Conklin as Bo
- Olin Howland as Lum Peters
- Pete Kirby as Musician
- Jimmy Riddle as Musician
- Joe Zinkan as Musician
- The Smoky Mountain Boys as Roy Acuff Band
- Carolina Cotton as Perky Durkin (uncredited)
