= Ethel Barrymore Theatre (TV series) =

- Also known as: Stage 8
- Genre: Anthology
- Directed by: Lewis Allen; Robert Florey
- Starring: Ethel Barrymore (host); Walter Brennan; Akim Tamiroff; Arthur Kennedy (actor); Eddie Bracken; Bonita Granville; Charles Coburn
- Country of origin: United States
- Original language: English
- No. of seasons: 1
- No. of episodes: 14

Production
- Producers: William A. Calihan Jr. Lee Savin
- Running time: 25 minutes

Original release
- Network: DuMont/WABD/Syndication
- Release: September 21 – December 21, 1956

Ethel Barrymore Theatre was a half-hour anthology television series hosted by Ethel Barrymore and the last series produced by the DuMont Television Network.

While produced by the network, the series was aired on Fridays at 8:30pm ET from September 21 to December 21, 1956 on DuMont station WABD after the network had closed. The series may have been filmed in 1953, and was known as Stage 8 in syndication.

Among the actors appearing were Arthur Kennedy, Charles Coburn, Anita Louise, Gene Lockhart, Eddie Bracken, and Akim Tamiroff.

== Background ==
In 1952, Barrymore signed a contract with Interstate Television Corporation to work on The Ethel Barrymore Theatre as actress, advisor, and commentator. The contract included "a substantial salary plus residual rights".

The second episode produced by ITC in 1952 was Daughters of Mars, which starred Barrymore, Selena Royle, Elizabeth Risdon, and Phillip Terry. The director was Lewis Allen, and the producer was Lee Savin.

== Episode status ==
As with most DuMont series, no episodes are known to exist.

== See also ==
- List of programs broadcast by the DuMont Television Network
- List of surviving DuMont Television Network broadcasts

== Bibliography ==
- David Weinstein, The Forgotten Network: DuMont and the Birth of American Television (Philadelphia: Temple University Press, 2004) ISBN 1-59213-245-6
- Alex McNeil, Total Television, Fourth edition (New York: Penguin Books, 1980) ISBN 0-14-024916-8
- Tim Brooks and Earle Marsh, The Complete Directory to Prime Time Network TV Shows, Third edition (New York: Ballantine Books, 1964) ISBN 0-345-31864-1
