= Elmo Veron =

American film and television editor (1903–1990)

- Born: Elmo Joseph Veron; September 17, 1903; New Orleans, Louisiana, USA
- Died: November 7, 1990 (aged 87); Los Angeles, California, USA
- Other name: Elmo J. Veron
- Occupation: Film editor
- Years active: 1937–1972

Elmo Veron (September 17, 1903 – November 7, 1990) was an American film and television editor. He worked on nearly 50 different TV shows and films during his career. Which included some of Mickey Rooney's films from the early 1940s.

He was nominated at the 10th Academy Awards in the category of Best Film Editing for his work on the film Captains Courageous.

== Filmography ==
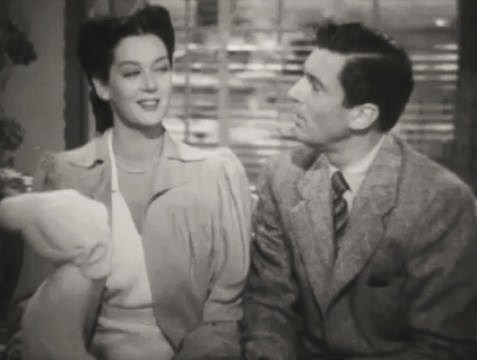
Rosalind Russell and Walter Pidgeon in Design for Scandal.

- Captains Courageous (1937)
- Saratoga (1937)
- Thoroughbreds Don't Cry (1937)
- Boys Town (1938)
- The Girl Downstairs (1938)
- Paradise for Three (1938)
- The Toy Wife (1938)
- Young Dr. Kildare (1938)
- Fast and Furious (1939)
- Fast and Loose (1939)
- Lady of the Tropics (1939)
- Lucky Night (1939)
- Nick Carter, Master Detective (1939)
- Keeping Company (1940)
- The Mortal Storm (1940)
- Third Finger, Left Hand (1940)
- Young Tom Edison (1940)
- Andy Hardy's Private Secretary (1941)
- Design for Scandal (1941)
- I'll Wait for You (1941)
- Life Begins for Andy Hardy (1941)
- Calling Dr. Gillespie (1942)
- The Courtship of Andy Hardy (1942)
- Joe Smith, American (1942)
- Reunion in France (1942)
- The War Against Mrs. Hadley (1942)
- A Stranger in Town (1943)
- Swing Shift Maisie (1943)
- Till We Meet Again (1944)
- The Return of Rin Tin Tin (1947)
- Trouble at Melody Mesa (1949)
- Cry Vengeance (1954)
