= Freedom Comes High =

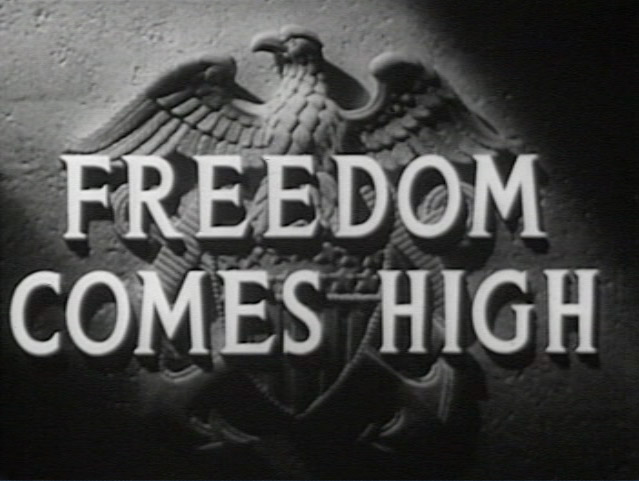
- Directed by: Lewis Allen
- Starring: James Craig; Barbara Britton
- Cinematography: Stuart Thompson
- Release date: 1944
- Running time: 13 minutes
- Country: United States
- Language: English

Freedom Comes High is a 1944 dramatic short film commissioned by the United States Government during World War II and directed by Lewis Allen.

== Synopsis ==
The playlet involves a young woman coming home, tired, after a busy day at a war plant. Each time she comes in there is a letter from her husband overseas, and she remembers their conversations before he went off to war. She was concerned about him, because she felt it was a "young man's war" and he should stay home with her and the baby. However he was insistent that his country needed him. The plot then turns to the husband trying to manage his ship while it is being attacked by a submarine. The next day, the woman receives another letter from her husband, who is shown in double exposure, reminding her that freedom comes high, often at the price of human lives. The door bell rings, and it is a Western Union telegram, saying that her husband died.

The point of the film was to communicate to the American people that many of their sons and husbands who were going overseas, would not be coming back, and that they would have to understand they would be sacrificing their loved ones to secure freedom. Given the extraordinary sensitivity of the subject matter, the government short is notable both as propaganda and as a meditation on what has to be sacrificed for the maintenance of freedom.

== Cast ==
- James Craig as Steve Blanding
- Barbara Britton as Ellen Blanding
- Donald Cook as The Captain
- Cecil Kellaway as Father
- Mabel Paige as Rhoda
- Charles Quigley as Jacobs

== See also ==
- List of Allied propaganda films of World War II
