= Not Tonight Henry =

1960 American film

- Theatrical release poster
- Directed by: W. Merle Connell
- Written by: Ted Paramore; Bob Heiderich
- Produced by: Ted Paramore; Bob Heiderich
- Starring: Hank Henry
- Cinematography: W. Merle Connell
- Edited by: William Brown
- Music by: Hal Bourne
- Production company: Triumph Productions
- Release date: 1960
- Running time: 70 minutes
- Country: United States
- Language: English

Not Tonight Henry is a 1960 American comedy exploitation film directed by W. Merle Connell and starring Hank Henry. It was written and produced by Ted Paramore and Bob Heiderich. It was one of the first American "nudie cutie" films.

== Scenario ==
"Mr X", a typical married man, visits his local bar and daydreams a series of comedic dramatic vignettes each of which features scantily-clad or topless young women.

== Cast ==
- Hank Henry as Mr X
- John Herbert as narrator
- Larry Burrell as narrator
- Joni Day
- Babe McDonald
- Margie Welling
- Doreen Dare
- Brandy Long
- Betty Blue
- Joan Burgess
- Genii Young
- Sue Woods
- Lisa Drake
- Valkyra
- Little Jack Little

== Production ==
The film cost $71,000 to make and was filmed over nine days.

== Release ==
Not Tonight Henry opened in Los Angeles on 30 Dec 1960 at the Monica International Theater, the previous night's showing having been stopped due to a police raid and the confiscation of the film.

== Reception ==
=== Box office ===
According to Boxoffice, in 1961 the film "closed its 15th week at the Monica with a gross to date of $101,600, an alltime record in the 640-seat house."

=== Critical ===
The Hollywood Reporter wrote: "There is no real plot to Not Tonight Henry, only a thread or G-string of an idea whose sole function is to allow the photography of as much female nudity as possible. The film has nothing to recommend it except this nakedness, which is relentlessly presented, often in huge, screen filling closeups. There must be an underground that keeps patrons of this sort of thing alert, because at the opening matinee of Not Tonight Henry, the Monica Theatre was almost filled by the time the first feature had wound "

Variety wrote: "Old-fashioned 'adults only' burlesque peep show translated fo celluloid. Artistically zero, but should attract the bare-babe-oglers wherever theatres cater to such whims. ... The 'plot' is a poor, generally humorless excuse for regular displays of chest cleavage and bare derrierres, mostly in skinny-dipped Eastman color. Bulk of the activity is of the no-dialog variety, accompanied by a tedious narration stuffed with puns and plays-on-words."
