= The Imperfect Lady (1947 film) =

1947 film by Lewis Allen

- Theatrical release poster
- Directed by: Lewis Allen
- Written by: Karl Tunberg (adaptation); Ladislas Fodor (story)
- Produced by: Karl Tunberg
- Starring: Ray Milland; Teresa Wright; Cedric Hardwicke
- Cinematography: John Seitz
- Edited by: Duncan Mansfield
- Music by: Victor Young
- Production company: Paramount Pictures
- Distributed by: Paramount Pictures
- Release date: April 25, 1947
- Running time: 97 minutes
- Country: United States
- Language: English
- Box office: $1.8 million

The Imperfect Lady is a 1947 American historical drama film directed by Lewis Allen and starring Ray Milland, Teresa Wright and Cedric Hardwicke, filmed in 1945 and not released until 1947. In the late Victorian Britain an aristocratic politician falls in love with a showgirl. The film is also known by the alternative title Mrs. Loring's Secret.

== Plot ==
In 1892, showgirls Millie and Rose have a chance encounter with Clive Loring, a politician who invites them to tea. Millie falls for Clive and vows to give up the stage, but his brother Lord Belmont nevertheless disapproves.

Going out in public in stage makeup, Millie and Rose are mistaken for prostitutes. And a man Millie spends a few innocent hours with, Jose Martinez, is arrested for a murder. His only chance of being proven innocent is if Millie will provide an alibi, but she denies knowing him, fearing it will reflect poorly on Clive.

Lord Belmont's suspicions are confirmed when he attends the trial. Martinez is convicted, but it's obvious he was telling the truth in identifying Millie as the woman he'd been with at the time.

Millie is coerced into testifying as a public outcry begins for Clive to resign from Parliament. But despite the uproar, Clive decides to remain true to his love.

== Cast ==
- Ray Milland as Clive Loring
- Teresa Wright as Millicent Hopkins
- Cedric Hardwicke as Lord Belmont
- Virginia Field as Rose Bridges
- Anthony Quinn as Jose Martínez
- Reginald Owen as Mr. Hopkins
- Melville Cooper as Lord Montglyn
- Rhys Williams as Inspector Carston
- George Zucco as Mr. Mallam
- Charles Coleman as Sam Travers
- Miles Mander as Mr. Rogan
- Gordon Richards as Gladstone
- Edmund Breon as Lord Chief Justice
- Frederick Worlock as Henderson
- Michael Dyne as Malcolm Gadby
- Joan Winfield as Lucy
- Lillian Fontaine as Mrs. Gunner
- Gordon Richards as Gladstone
- Ted Billings as Chimney Sweep (uncredited)
- Harry Cording as Policeman (uncredited)
- John Goldsworthy as Bobby (uncredited)
- Olaf Hytten as Butler (uncredited)
