= Twilight on the Trail =

1941 film by Howard Bretherton

- Theatrical release poster
- Directed by: Howard Bretherton
- Screenplay by: J. Benton Cheney; Ellen Corby; Cecile Kramer
- Produced by: Harry Sherman
- Starring: William Boyd; Andy Clyde; Brad King; Wanda McKay; Jack Rockwell; Norman Willis; Robert Kent
- Cinematography: Russell Harlan
- Edited by: Fred R. Feitshans Jr.
- Music by: John Leipold
- Production company: Harry Sherman Productions
- Distributed by: Paramount Pictures
- Release date: September 29, 1941
- Running time: 57 minutes
- Country: United States
- Language: English

Twilight on the Trail is a 1941 American Western film directed by Howard Bretherton, written by J. Benton Cheney, Ellen Corby and Cecile Kramer, and starring William Boyd, Andy Clyde, Brad King, Wanda McKay, Jack Rockwell, Norman Willis and Robert Kent. It was released on September 29, 1941, by Paramount Pictures.

== Plot ==
Hoppy, California, and Johnny are undercover detectives that break up a cattle rustling ring. Wanda McKay plays Lucy Brent. Johnny sings “Twilight on the Trail”.

== Cast ==
- William Boyd as Hopalong Cassidy
- Andy Clyde as California Carlson
- Brad King as Johnny Nelson
- Wanda McKay as Lucy Brent
- Jack Rockwell as Jim Brent
- Norman Willis as Nat Kervy
- Robert Kent as Ash Drake
- Tom London as Tim Gregg
- Frank Austin as Steve Farley

== Bibliography ==
- Fetrow, Alan G. Feature Films, 1940-1949: a United States Filmography. McFarland, 1994.
