= Albuquerque (film) =

1948 film by Ray Enright

- Theatrical release poster
- Directed by: Ray Enright
- Screenplay by: Gene Lewis; Clarence Upson Young
- Based on: Dead Freight for Piute by Luke Short
- Produced by: William H. Pine; William C. Thomas
- Starring: Randolph Scott; Barbara Britton; George "Gabby" Hayes; Lon Chaney Jr.
- Cinematography: Fred Jackman Jr.
- Edited by: Howard A. Smith
- Music by: Darrell Calker
- Production company: Clarion Productions
- Distributed by: Paramount Pictures
- Release date: February 20, 1948 (US)
- Running time: 90 minutes
- Country: United States
- Language: English
- Budget: $728,000
- Box office: $1.7 million (US rentals)

Albuquerque is a 1948 American Cinecolor Western film directed by Ray Enright and starring Randolph Scott, Barbara Britton, George "Gabby" Hayes, and Lon Chaney Jr. Based on the novel Dead Freight for Piute by Luke Short, with a screenplay by Gene Lewis and Clarence Upson Young, the film is about a man who is recruited by his corrupt uncle to inherit his freight-hauling empire in the southwest, and who eventually defects to his uncle's honest business rival.

== Plot ==
During a stagecoach holdup, Celia Wallace is robbed of $10,000 and little Myrtle Walton is saved from the runaway horses by a passenger, Cole Armin.

Celia is grateful until she learns Cole is coming to Albuquerque to work for his uncle, John Armin, a ruthless freight-line owner who stops at nothing to put competitors Celia and her brother Ted out of business.

Concluding that his uncle was even behind the robbery, Cole switches sides to work for the Wallaces. Armin uses a woman, Letty Tyler, to spy on his adversaries, but she resents being used when a mine is blown up and Ted is wounded by gunfire.

Cole is framed for arson and jailed. Celia, who loves him, turns against Cole until his acquittal, when Letty explains that John Armin is the man responsible. After an ambush, Cole has to shoot the corrupt sheriff and another gunman, and John Armin dies in the gunfire as well.

== Cast ==
- Randolph Scott as Cole Armin
- Barbara Britton as Letty Tyler
- George "Gabby" Hayes as Juke
- Lon Chaney Jr. as Steve Murkil
- Russell Hayden as Ted Wallace
- Catherine Craig as Celia Wallace
- George Cleveland as John Armin
- Irving Bacon as Dave Walton
- Bernard Nedell as Sheriff Ed Linton
- Karolyn Grimes as Myrtle Walton
- Russell Simpson as Abner Huggins
- Jody Gilbert as Pearl Eager
- John Halloran as Matt Wayne
- Dan White as Henchman Jackson
- Walter Baldwin as Judge Fred Martin

== Production ==
The film was based on the Luke Short novel, Dead Freight for Piute published in 1941. The New York Times called it a "stirring tale".

Film rights went to William Pine and William Thomas who ran Pine-Thomas Productions. In January 1946 it was reported Clarence Young was writing the script which would be called The Last Frontier and Johnny Weissmuller would star. By March the project was retitled Albuquerque and it was reported Pine and Thomas were looking "for a big time star". In August 1946 Randolph Scott signed to star. Pine-Thomas specialised in low budget films, but in December they formed a separate company, Clarion, to make one expensive film a year. Albuquerque was to be its first.

Arlee Whelan was originally announced for the lead. The following month she was withdrawn for another film and replaced by Barbara Britton.

Albuquerque was filmed on location at Iverson Movie Ranch in Chatsworth, California, and in Sedona, Arizona.

Britton later sued Paramount for $100,000 over the size of her billing.

== Reception ==
The film was a success at the box office, earning almost $2 million.
