= Secret of the Wastelands =

1941 film by Derwin Abrahams

Secret of the Wasteland
- Theatrical release poster
- Directed by: Derwin Abrahams
- Screenplay by: Gerald Geraghty
- Story by: Harry Sinclair Drago; Clarence E. Mulford (characters created)
- Based on: Secret of the Wastelands; 1940 novel by Bliss Lomax
- Produced by: Harry Sherman
- Starring: William Boyd; Andy Clyde; Brad King; Soo Yong; Barbara Britton; Douglas Fowley; Keith Richards
- Cinematography: Russell Harlan
- Edited by: Fred R. Feitshans Jr.
- Music by: John Leipold
- Production company: Harry Sherman Productions
- Distributed by: Paramount Pictures
- Release date: November 15, 1941
- Running time: 66 minutes
- Country: United States
- Language: English

Secret of the Wasteland is a 1941 American Western film directed by Derwin Abrahams and written by Gerald Geraghty. The film stars William Boyd, Andy Clyde, Brad King, Soo Yong, Barbara Britton, Douglas Fowley and Keith Richards. The film was released on November 15, 1941, by Paramount Pictures. The on-screen title is Secrets of the Wasteland ("Secrets" is plural, "Wasteland" is singular).

== Synopsis ==
Hopalong Cassidy and his two accomplices, California and Johnny, are engaged in an archaeological expedition.

== Cast ==
- William Boyd as Hopalong Cassidy
- Andy Clyde as California Carlson
- Brad King as Johnny Nelson
- Soo Yong as Moy Soong
- Barbara Britton as Jennifer Kendall
- Douglas Fowley as Slade Salters
- Keith Richards as Clay Elliott
- Richard Loo as Quan
- Lee Tung Foo as Doy Kee
- Gordon Hart as Dr. Malcolm Birdsall
- Earl Gunn as Henchman Clanton
- Ian MacDonald as Henchman Hollister
- John Rawlins as Williams
- Roland Got as Yeng
- Hal Price as Professor Balto Stubbs

== Bibliography ==
- Fetrow, Alan G. Feature Films, 1940-1949: a United States Filmography. McFarland, 1994.
