= Stick to Your Guns (film) =

1941 film by Lesley Selander

- Theatrical release poster
- Directed by: Lesley Selander
- Screenplay by: J. Benton Cheney
- Produced by: Harry Sherman
- Starring: William Boyd; Andy Clyde; Brad King; Jennifer Holt; Dick Curtis; Weldon Heyburn; Henry Hall
- Cinematography: Russell Harlan
- Edited by: Carroll Lewis
- Music by: John Leipold
- Production company: Harry Sherman Productions
- Distributed by: Paramount Pictures
- Release date: September 17, 1941
- Running time: 63 minutes
- Country: United States
- Language: English

Stick to Your Guns is a 1941 American Western film directed by Lesley Selander, written by J. Benton Cheney, and starring William Boyd, Andy Clyde, Brad King, Jennifer Holt, Dick Curtis, Weldon Heyburn, and Henry Hall. It was released on September 17, 1941, by Paramount Pictures.

== Cast ==
- William Boyd as Hopalong Cassidy
- Andy Clyde as California Carlson
- Brad King as Johnny Nelson
- Jennifer Holt as June Winters
- Dick Curtis as Nevada Teale
- Weldon Heyburn as Henchman Gila
- Henry Hall as Jud Winters
- Jack Rockwell as Henchman Carp
- Ian MacDonald as Henchman Elbows
- Kermit Maynard as Henchman Layton
- Charles Middleton as Long Ben
- Homer Holcomb as Lanky Smith
- Tom London as Waffles
- Tom Ung as Chinese Charlie
- Jimmy Wakely as Pete
- Johnny Bond as Skinny
- Dick Reinhart as Bow-Wow
