= Outlaws of the Desert =

1941 film by Howard Bretherton

- Theatrical release poster
- Directed by: Howard Bretherton
- Screenplay by: J. Benton Cheney; Bernard McConville
- Produced by: Harry Sherman
- Starring: William Boyd; Andy Clyde; Brad King; Duncan Renaldo; Luli Deste; Forrest Stanley; Nina Guilbert
- Cinematography: Russell Harlan
- Edited by: Carroll Lewis
- Music by: John Leipold
- Production company: Harry Sherman Productions
- Distributed by: Paramount Pictures
- Release date: November 1, 1941
- Running time: 66 minutes
- Country: United States
- Language: English

Outlaws of the Desert is a 1941 American Western film directed by Howard Bretherton and written by J. Benton Cheney and Bernard McConville. The film stars William Boyd, Andy Clyde, Brad King, Duncan Renaldo, Luli Deste, Jean Phillips, Forrest Stanley and Nina Guilbert. The film was released on November 1, 1941, by Paramount Pictures.

== Synopsis ==
Hopalong Cassidy (William Boyd) and his friends Johnny Nelson (Brad King) and California Carlson (Andy Clyde), have been requested by the US government to purchase a herd of Arabian horses in Arabia.

== Cast ==
- William Boyd as Hopalong Cassidy
- Andy Clyde as California Carlson
- Brad King as Johnny Nelson
- Duncan Renaldo as Sheik Suleiman
- Jean Phillips as Susan Grant
- Forrest Stanley as Charles Grant
- Nina Guilbert as Mrs. Jane Grant
- Luli Deste as Marie Karitza
- Alberto Morin as Nicki Karitza
- George J. Lewis as Yussuf
- Jean Del Val as Faran El Kader
- Jamiel Hasson as Ali
- Mickey Eissa as Salim

== Bibliography ==
- Fetrow, Alan G. Feature Films, 1940-1949: a United States Filmography. McFarland, 1994.
