= Brad King (actor) =

American actor

Brad King (born Jack Oliver Watt; November 23, 1917 – November 1, 1991) was an American actor. He is best known for briefly playing Hopalong Cassidy's sidekick, Johnny Nelson, in five of the Hoppy films.

King was born on a ranch in Lander County, Nevada. After his father's death and his mother's remarriage, the family moved to a ranch in Bountiful, Utah. He had two younger brothers. At age 20, he worked as wagon boss for a ranch in Nye County, Nevada. He also won prizes in rodeo competition. He was drafted into the U.S. Army in 1941 before he could complete his sixth Cassidy film.

== Filmography ==
- Trouble at Melody Mesa (1949)
- Pistol Packin' Nitwits (1945)
- Secret of the Wastelands (1941)
- Outlaws of the Desert (1941)
- Twilight on the Trail (1941)
- Riders of the Timberline (1941)
- Stick to Your Guns (1941)
