= Till We Meet Again (1944 film) =

1944 film by Frank Borzage

- Theatrical release poster
- Directed by: Frank Borzage
- Screenplay by: Lenore J. Coffee
- Produced by: David Lewis
- Starring: Ray Milland; Barbara Britton; Walter Slezak; Lucile Watson; Konstantin Shayne; Vladimir Sokoloff; Mona Freeman
- Cinematography: Theodor Sparkuhl
- Edited by: Elmo Veron
- Music by: David Buttolph
- Production company: Paramount Pictures
- Distributed by: Paramount Pictures
- Release date: August 30, 1944
- Running time: 88 minutes
- Country: United States
- Language: English

Till We Meet Again is a 1944 American drama film directed by Frank Borzage, written by Lenore J. Coffee, and starring Ray Milland, Barbara Britton, Walter Slezak, Lucile Watson, Konstantin Shayne, Vladimir Sokoloff and Mona Freeman. It was released on August 30, 1944, by Paramount Pictures.

== Plot ==
A nun helps a downed U.S. pilot escape the Nazis during World War II. His plane was shot down, and he is taken in by the French Resistance before being moved to a convent in occupied France. A young novice nun, Clothilde, takes an interest in him and is willing to help him escape to England, but the pilot must continue his mission in disguise by impersonating the husband of a woman from the neighboring village.

== Cast ==
- Ray Milland as John
- Barbara Britton as Sister Clothilde / Louise Dupree
- Walter Slezak as Vitrey
- Lucile Watson as Mother Superior
- Konstantin Shayne as Major Krupp
- Vladimir Sokoloff as Cabeau
- Mona Freeman as Elise
- William Edmunds as Henri Maret

== Production ==
The lead was to be played by Maureen O'Hara but she fell pregnant.

== Radio adaptation ==
Till We Meet Again was presented on the Kate Smith Hour September 24, 1944. Jeanne Cagney and Franchot Tone starred in the adaptation.
