= Frederick Stephani =

Film director (1903–1962)

- Born: June 13, 1903; Bonn, Germany
- Died: October 31, 1962 (aged 59); Los Angeles, California
- Known for: Filmmaking
- Notable work: Flash Gordon

Frederick Stephani (June 13, 1903 – October 31, 1962) was a screenwriter and film director. He is best known for co-writing and directing the 13-chapter science fiction serial Flash Gordon in 1936. The serial became Universal's second highest-grossing productions that year. Despite its success, this was the first and only serial Stephani directed over the course of his career, possibly due to its shortcomings in special effects and overall production values, even by contemporary standards. Stephani continued to write, produce and direct feature films and television episodes into the 1960s.

== Selected filmography ==
- Flash Gordon (1936) - writer and director
- Fast Company (1938) - producer
- Tarzan's New York Adventure (1942) - producer
- Steve Randall (1952, TV series) - writer and director
- Passport to Danger (1954, TV series) - writer and director
- Bombs on Monte Carlo (1960) - writer
- The Deputy (1961, TV series) - director
