= Constantin Alajalov =

American painter and illustrator

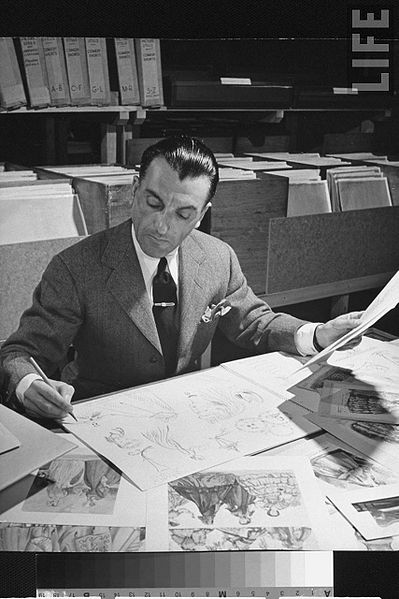
Constantin Alajálov

Constantin Alajálov (born Konstandin Alaǰalyan, Armenian: Կոնստանդին Ալաջալյան; 18 November 1900 — 23 October 1987) was an Armenian-American painter and illustrator. He was born in Rostov-on-Don, Russia, and immigrated to New York City in 1923, becoming a US citizen in 1928. Many of his illustrations were covers for such magazines as The New Yorker, The Saturday Evening Post, and Fortune. He also illustrated many books, including the first edition of George Gershwin's Song Book. His works are in New York's Museum of Modern Art and the Brooklyn Museum. He died in Amenia, New York.

== Life ==
Constantin Alajálov was born in Rostov-on-Don, Russia, in 1900 to an Armenian family. In 1917, the Red Revolution broke out, interrupting Alajálov's time at the University of Petrograd. Unable to stay, Alajálov joined a government organized group of artists. Traveling the countryside, they painted large propaganda murals and posters for the revolution. After this, Alajálov emigrated to Persia and again started painting for a revolution until no longer safe.

After his stay in Persia, Alajálov headed to Constantinople, his last stop before he emigrated to America at age 23. Getting a job was hard, but he finally landed one, painting wall murals at a restaurant about to be opened by Russian Countess Anna Zarnekau. Within three years, Alajálov was selling his paintings to The New Yorker magazine, where his first cover appeared on September 25, 1926. He went on to create more than 70 covers for the magazine. He also designed rugs for New York artist and entrepreneur Ralph Pearson.

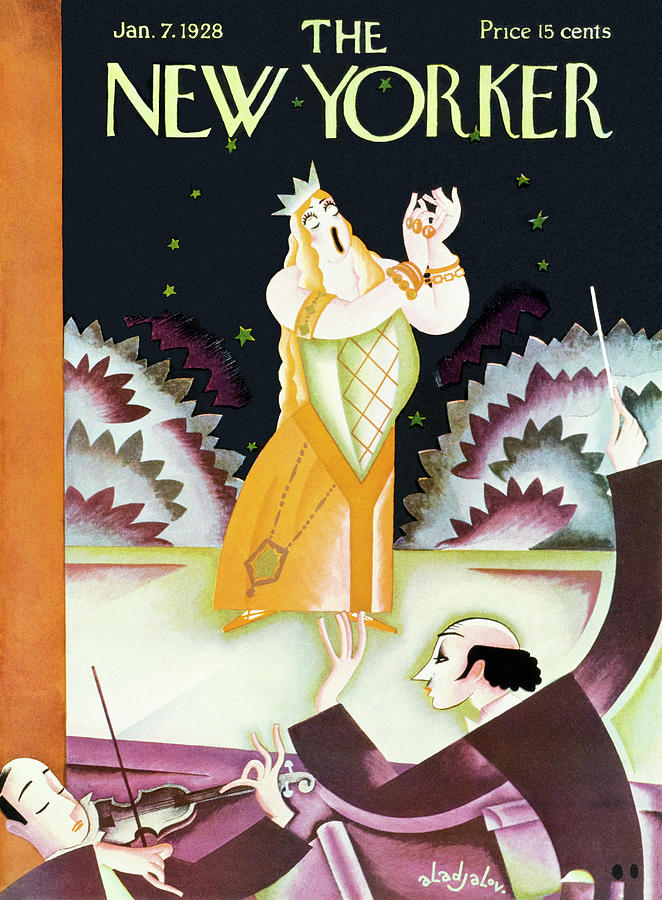
January 7, 1928 cover of The New Yorker by Alajalov

Alajálov's first cover for the Saturday Evening Post appeared on October 6, 1945; this was unusual in that he was also doing covers for The New Yorker at the time, and both publications ordinarily required exclusivity of their artists. His final cover was for the December 1, 1962, issue. That final cover portrayed an accomplished bridge player awakened from a dream, still analyzing her bridge hand. Many of his Saturday Evening Post cover paintings can be viewed at the American Illustrators Hall of Fame in Indianapolis.

Alajalov died in New York in 1987. His papers are at Syracuse University, and the Archives of American Art. He bequeathed funding for a scholarship in his name to Boston University, which also maintains a collection of his photographs and scrapbooks. The Boston University holdings include a painting of Alajálov by George Gershwin.

== Illustrations ==
- Flamingo, by Mary Borden (1927; Alajalov signed the dustjacket)
- Tantivy Towers, by A. P. Herbert (1931)
- George Gershwin, a New York contemporary of Russian-Jewish heritage, chose him to do a set of edgy drawings illustrating each of the 18 songs in the first editions of George Gershwin's Song Book (1932)
- Dithers and Jitters, by Cornelia Otis Skinner (1938)
- Soap Behind the Ears, by Cornelia Otis Skinner (1941)
- Conversation Pieces (1942) was an autobiographical book of Alajálov's illustrations. Janet Flanner wrote the text and commentary of the book.
- Our Hearts Were Young and Gay, by Cornelia Otis Skinner & Emily Kimbrough (1942)
- Sophie Halenczik, American, by Rose C. Feld (1943)
- Cinderella, Retold in Verse, by Alice Duer Miller (1943)
- Married at Leisure, by Virginia Lederer (pseudonym of Virginia Pringle) (1944)
- Esme of Paris, by Esme Davis (1944)
- Outside Eden, by Isabel Scott Rorick (1945)
- Hold Your Man, by Veronica Dengel (1945)
- Timothy's Angels, by William Rose Benét (1947)
- Family Album, by Paul Chavchavadze (1949)
- Nuts in May, by Cornelia Otis Skinner (1950)
- Bottoms Up!, by Cornelia Otis Skinner (1955)
- Aurora Dawn, by Herman Wouk (1956)
- The Island Players, by Ilka Chase (1956)
- Orpheus in America, Offenbach's Diary of his Journey in the New World, translated by Lander MacClintock (1957)
- The Ape in Me, by Cornelia Otis Skinner (1959)
