= Harry Watkins (actor) =

American actor, playwright and diarist (1825–1894)

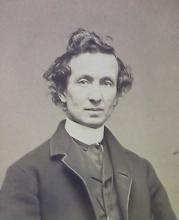
Harry Watkins, c. 1860s

Harry Watkins (January 14, 1825 – February 5, 1894) was an American actor, diarist, playwright and theatre manager, whose career spanned the latter half of the nineteenth century. He is best remembered for his diary, kept from 1845 to 1860, which is considered a rare source of firsthand information about theater in the U.S. during the antebellum period.

After beginning his long acting career in 1845, Watkins became manager of P. T. Barnum's American Museum's theatrical enterprises in 1857. He performed in England from 1860 to 1863. He was the author of more than 25 plays by 1889. His 13-volume diary, kept from 1845 to 1860, is a rare source of firsthand information about the theater during the antebellum period.

== Life and career ==
Watkins was born in New York. He began his acting career in 1845 and, although he was constantly employed as an actor for nearly five decades, he never achieved widespread fame. On February 5, 1854, Watkins married Harriet M. Secor with whom he had two children. It is not known what became of Harriet, but in 1860, Watkins married English-born actress and singer Rosina Shaw (widow of Charles Howard), who used the stage names Rose Howard and Rose Shaw. Watkins became manager of P. T. Barnum's American Museum's theatrical enterprises in 1857, where he wrote, presented, and acted in, among other things, The Pioneer Patriot. He and his wife, Rose, performed in England from 1860 to 1863. He was described by the British press as "decidedly one of the best delineators of Negro character", but in general his wife had more success in England.

Watkins played such roles as Edward Middleton in The Drunkard, Wool in his own adaptation of The Hidden Hand, and Titus in Brutus by John Howard Payne. He was the author of more than 25 plays by 1889. He was also actively engaged in politics, often expressing his views in his diary as well as in bulletins, such as How Shall I Vote? (1885), and in his book His Worst Enemy: Photographed from Life In New York (1889).

== Diary ==
Watkins' diary, which he kept during the first fifteen years of his acting career (November 20, 1845 – 1860), is a rare source of firsthand information about the theater during the antebellum period. It "is the only known diary of its size and scope written by an American actor during the decade prior to the Civil War".

Although Watkins' daughter, Amy Lee, had intended to use his diary as support to write a book about him, she exchanged it with Maud Durbin Skinner (the wife of Otis Skinner), probably due to financial hardship, for the amount of her dentist bill and a small compensation. The complete thirteen volumes of the original manuscript of the diaries are held as part of the Skinner Family papers at Houghton Library, Harvard University, which has digitized and made them available online. From 2012 to 2018, a group of scholars at the University of Michigan transcribed and publish the diaries in digital form to shed new light on pre-Civil War theatre culture and the experiences and conditions of artists during that period.

== Personal ==
Watkins and his first wife Harriet had two sons, George Washington Watkins (named after Harry's brother) and Harry Clay Watkins. With his second wife Rose, Watkins had two more children, William S. Watkins and Amy Lee Watkins. The children, as well as Watkins's stepson (Charles Howard Watkins), became actors. Charles and William both died in 1887, the former of consumption, and two weeks later the latter from a grape seed lodged in his appendix, which caused an inflammation and abscess, leading to a perforation of the intestine. Charles was 29, and William was 19.

== In popular culture ==
Watkins is fictionalized in the Martin Scorsese film Gangs of New York, in a scene where The Five Points Mission presents a dramatization of Harriet Beecher Stowe's Uncle Tom's Cabin. Barnum had presented H. J. Conway's popular version of Uncle Tom's Cabin at the American Museum in the 1850s, which varied from the novel especially in ending happily.
