= Our Hearts Were Growing Up =

1946 film

- Theatrical release poster
- Directed by: William D. Russell
- Written by: Melvin Frank; Norman Panama; Frank Waldman
- Produced by: Daniel Dare
- Starring: Gail Russell; Diana Lynn; Brian Donlevy; Billy De Wolfe; James Brown; Bill Edwards
- Cinematography: Stuart Thompson
- Edited by: Doane Harrison
- Music by: Victor Young
- Production company: Paramount Pictures
- Distributed by: Paramount Pictures
- Release date: June 14, 1946
- Running time: 83 minutes
- Country: United States
- Language: English

Our Hearts Were Growing Up is a 1946 American comedy film directed by William D. Russell and written by Melvin Frank, Norman Panama and Frank Waldman. It is the sequel to the 1944 film Our Hearts Were Young and Gay. The film stars Gail Russell, Diana Lynn, Brian Donlevy, Billy De Wolfe, James Brown and Bill Edwards. The film was released on June 16, 1946, by Paramount Pictures.

== Plot ==
During the Roaring Twenties, college girls Cornelia and Emily try to sort out their romantic entanglements while also becoming mixed up with bootleggers.

== Cast ==
- Gail Russell as Cornelia Otis Skinner
- Diana Lynn as Emily Kimbrough
- Brian Donlevy as Tony Minnetti
- Billy De Wolfe as Roland du Frere
- James Brown as Avery Moore
- Bill Edwards as Tom Newhall
- William Demarest as Peanuts Schultz
- Sharon Douglas as Suzanne Carter
- Mary Hatcher as Dibs Downing
- Sara Haden as Miss Dill
- Mikhail Rasumny as Bubchenko
- Isabel Randolph as Mrs. Southworth
- Frank Faylen as Federal Agent
