= Our Hearts Were Young and Gay (film) =

1944 film by Lewis Allen

- Theatrical release poster
- Directed by: Lewis Allen
- Written by: Sheridan Gibney
- Based on: Our Hearts Were Young and Gay by Emily Kimbrough; Cornelia Otis Skinner
- Produced by: Sheridan Gibney
- Starring: Gail Russell; Diana Lynn; Charlie Ruggles; Dorothy Gish; Beulah Bondi; James Brown
- Cinematography: Theodor Sparkuhl
- Edited by: Paul Weatherwax
- Music by: Werner R. Heymann
- Production company: Paramount Pictures
- Distributed by: Paramount Pictures Inc.
- Release date: April 10, 1944
- Running time: 81 minutes
- Country: United States
- Language: English

Our Hearts Were Young and Gay is a 1944 American comedy film directed by Lewis Allen and written by Sheridan Gibney. It was based on the real life reminiscences of the comic misadventures of Emily Kimbrough and Cornelia Otis Skinner in their book Our Hearts Were Young and Gay. The film stars Gail Russell, Diana Lynn, Charlie Ruggles, Dorothy Gish, Beulah Bondi, Bill Edwards and James Brown. After its premiere in New York on October 12, 1944, Our Hearts Were Young and Gay went into general release.

== Plot ==
In 1923, on the eve of the high school graduation, a pair of teenage girls, Cornelia Otis Skinner (Gail Russell) and Emily Kimbrough (Diana Lynn) are crestfallen when Emily contracts measles and cannot attend the dance. Cornelia, daughter of famous actor Otis Skinner (Charlie Ruggles), also bemoans the fact that "heartthrob," Avery Moore (James Brown), ignores her, and is about to leave on a European trip.

Emily suggests they both go to Europe, and without a chaperone. On the same boat as Avery, Cornelia accepts a date from him to go to a dance on the ship, while Emily meets Tom Newhall (Bill Edwards), a handsome young doctor and bachelor. Their romantic intentions go awry when Cornelia comes down with measles, and Tom agrees to use makeup to mask the spots, but she does not want to tell Avery about her infection.

When the ship reaches London, Cornelia's parents, who had traveled on another cruise ship, meet the two girls. At a tour of Hampton Court Palace, Cornelia spots Avery and the two young people reunite, but after kissing her, Avery comes down with measles. Cornelia and Emily head off for Paris to sight see on their own.

After getting trapped on a balcony at Notre Dame Cathedral, the girls drop articles of clothing to try to get the attention of passersby, to no avail. When Cornelia and Emily finally return to their hotel in their slips, they encounter Mr. Skinner's friend, actor Monsieur Darnet (Georges Renavent), and his friend, Pierre Cambouille (Roland Varno). To help them, the gentlemen escort them inside, but Avery thinks the worst and hits Cambouille. A brawl erupts just as Mr. and Mrs. Skinner arrive from England, and Mr. Skinner insists that it is time for his daughter to return home. After bidding fond farewells to Avery and Tom, Cornelia and Emily board the ship home, ending their European misadventures.

== Cast ==
- Gail Russell as Cornelia Otis Skinner
- Diana Lynn as Emily Kimbrough
- Charlie Ruggles as Otis Skinner
- Dorothy Gish as Mrs. Skinner (Note: Silent screen star Dorothy Gish was in her first "talkie".)
- Beulah Bondi as Miss Horn
- James Brown as Avery Moore
- Bill Edwards as Tom Newhall
- Jean Heather as Frances Smithers
- Alma Kruger as Mrs. Lamberton
- Helen Freeman as Mrs. Smithers (uncredited)
- Joy Harington as English girl (uncredited)
- Valentine Perkins as English girl (uncredited)
- Georges Renavent as Monsieur Darnet (uncredited)
- Roland Varno as Pierre Cambouille (uncredited)

== Production ==
Principal photography on Our Hearts Were Young and Gay began on August 24, 1943, and continued until October 21, 1943. Added scenes began shooting on November 10, 1943. Although Cornelia Otis Skinner and Emily Kimbrough, on whose memoirs the film is based, worked on the script, they were not credited, although Emily did have a "bit" part in the film.

In casting, a number of actors were considered including Katharine Hepburn to play Cornelia, with Jane Withers and Mimi Chandler also tested for roles in the film.

== Reception ==
Film critic Armond White (A.W.) in reviewing Our Hearts Were Young and Gay for The New York Times said, "Obviously not designed to deliver a message, Our Hearts Were Young and Gay, Paramount's film version of the Cornelia Otis Skinner-Emily Kimbrough book of remembrances of hectic things past, lives up to its title. Blithely recalling the trip abroad made by those ladies when they were in their impressionable 'teens, its story is as light as a marshmallow and sometimes as cloyingly sweet. Although the picture's foreword coyly denies that it is intended as a period piece, it very often uses the devices of dated clothes and manners to garner laughs. If the film occasionally stumbles on its merry way, blame it on those arid humorless stretches when Our Hearts Were Young and Gay becomes more young than gay. Generally, however, the producers have fused the effervescence of youth with rosy-tinted nostalgia to make an amusing and satisfying entertainment."

In 1945, although a news item in The Hollywood Reporter indicated that Skinner and Kimbrough took legal action against Paramount to prevent a sequel to Our Hearts Were Young and Gay, a judge ruled in favor of the studio. In the sequel, Our Hearts Were Growing Up (1946), Gail Russell, Diana Lynn, James Brown and Bill Edwards reprised their roles.
