= Mimi Chandler =

American actress and singer (1926–2016)

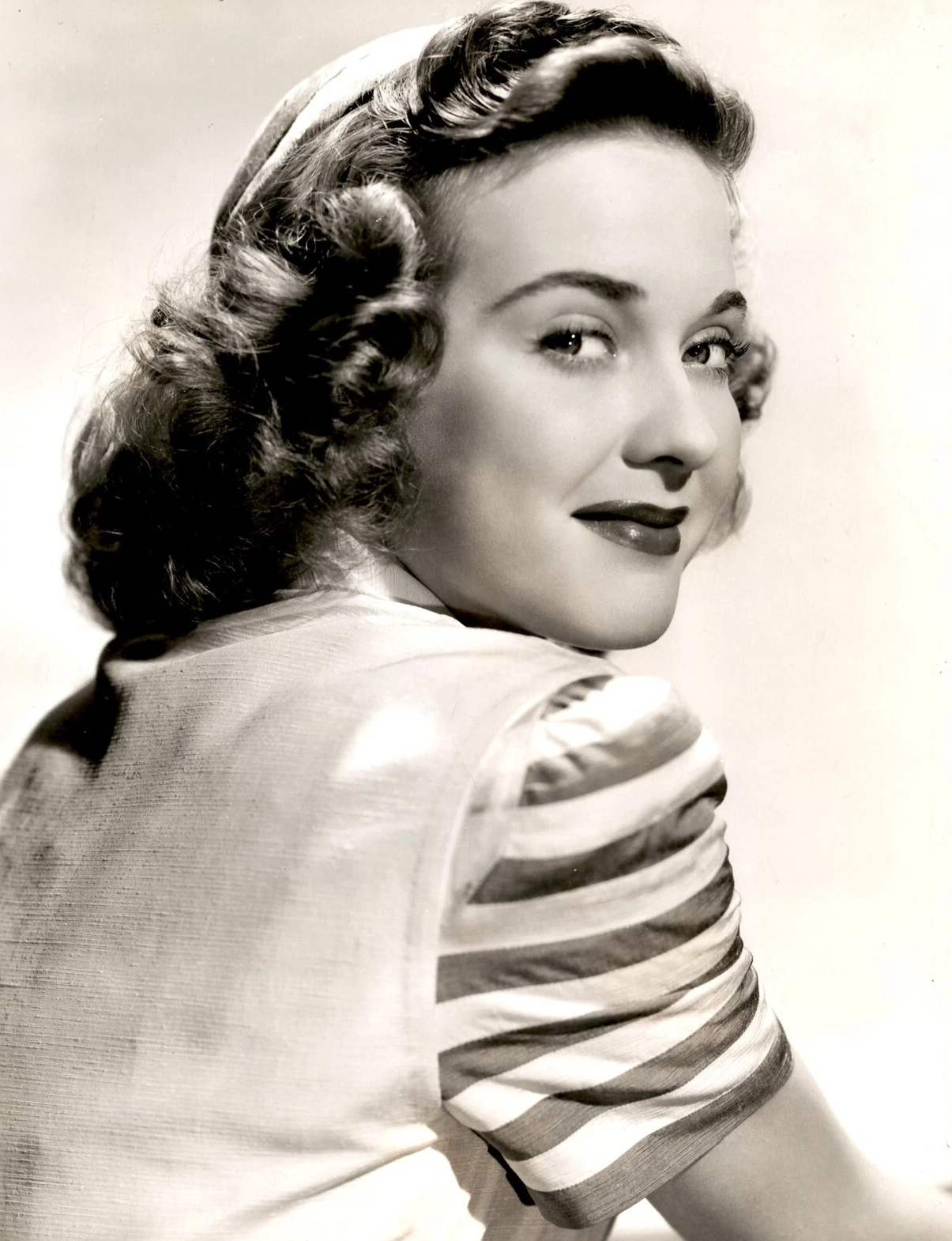
- Chandler c. 1944
- Born: Mildred Watkins Chandler; October 15, 1926; Versailles, Kentucky, U.S.
- Died: September 13, 2016 (aged 89); Lexington, Kentucky, U.S.
- Resting place: Saint Johns Episcopal Church Columbarium
- Occupations: Actress; singer
- Spouse(s): John Kennedy Cabell (m. 1944; ?); Bruce Lewis(m. ?)
- Children: 3
- Father: Happy Chandler
- Relatives: Ben Chandler (nephew)

Mildred "Mimi" Watkins Chandler (October 15, 1926 – September 13, 2016) was an American actress and singer. Chandler had a short career as an actress at Paramount Pictures. She was cast in two films, "Henry Aldrich Swings It" and "And The Angels Sing".

== Biography ==
Chandler was born in Versailles, Kentucky, to Mildred Lucille Watkins and Albert Benjamin "Happy" Chandler. Her father was the second Commissioner of Baseball, a U.S. senator from Kentucky, and twice governor of Kentucky.

She was discovered by David Butler at age twelve when her family, then the first family of Kentucky, were invited to watch the premier of his film Kentucky (1938). In 1942, Mimi and her family travelled to California to attend her sister's wedding. During this time they visited Butler's house, where he introduced her to Buddy DeSylva, then executive producer at Paramount Pictures.

On September 24, 1942, at age fifteen, Chandler had a screen test at Paramount where she sang the songs "How Come You Do Me Like You Do?" and the novelty song "Mr. Five by Five". After her screen test DeSylva was impressed and was quoted as saying to her father Happy that "She's a triple threat, she can sing, she can dance and she can act." In 1942, she was signed to a seven-year contract to Paramount starting at $150 a week.

Her first role was in the 1943 B film, Henry Aldrich Swings It, the sixth film in the Henry Aldrich film series, where she replaced Diana Lynn as the female lead. She then was given a starring role as one of four singing sisters in the 1944 film, And the Angels Sing with Fred MacMurray, Dorothy Lamour, Betty Hutton and Diana Lynn. She did a screen test for a role in Our Hearts Were Young and Gay (1944).

In June, 1944, Chandler, then 17, married army major John Kennedy Cabell. Paramount subsequently suspended Chandler's contract, with her only having been in films for a year.

She went on to become a disk jockey for the then newly formed radio station WVLK and later became an executive for Kentucky State Tourism.

Chandler died from complications of a stroke on September 13, 2016, at the age of 89, in Lexington, Kentucky.

== Personal life ==
Chandler's first marriage was to John Kennedy Cabell in 1944 and she later went on to marry Bruce Lewis.

== Filmography ==
- Henry Aldrich Swings It (1943) – Mimi Gray
- And the Angels Sing (1944) – Patti Angel
