= Bethel Leslie =

American actress and screenwriter (1929–1999)

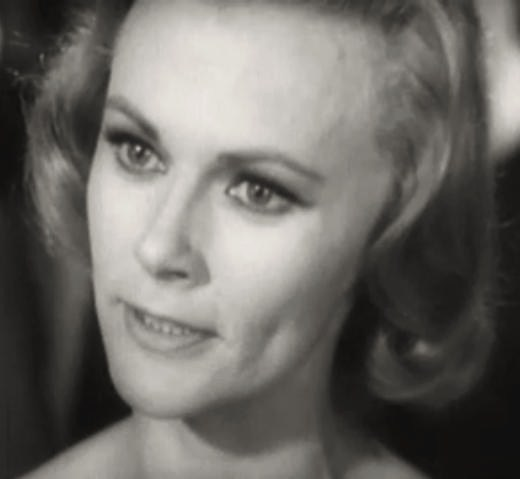
- Leslie in A Rage to Live (1965)
- Born: Jane Bethel Leslie; August 3, 1929; New York City, U.S.
- Died: November 28, 1999 (aged 70); New York City, U.S.
- Occupations: Actress, screenwriter
- Years active: 1949–1999
- Spouse: Andrew McCullough (m. 1953; div. 1964)
- Children: 1 daughter

Jane Bethel Leslie (August 3, 1929 – November 28, 1999) was an American actress and screenwriter. In a career spanning half a century, she was nominated for a Primetime Emmy Award and a Laurel Award in 1964, a Tony Award in 1986, and a CableACE Award in 1988.

== Early years ==
Jane Bethel Leslie was born in New York City. Her parents were a lawyer, Warren Leslie, and Jane Leslie, a newspaperwoman. Bethel was a student at Brearley School in New York City. She had a brother, writer Warren Leslie.

While a 13-year-old student at Brearley School, Leslie was discovered by George Abbott, who cast her in the play Snafu in 1944. In a 1965 newspaper article, Leslie described herself as "a 'quick study' – able to learn my lines rather fast."

== Career ==
=== Stage ===
Over the next four decades, Leslie appeared in a number of Broadway productions, including Goodbye, My Fancy (1948), The Time of the Cuckoo (1952), Inherit the Wind (1955), Catch Me If You Can (1965), and Long Day's Journey Into Night (1986). In 1950, Leslie was cast as Cornelia Otis Skinner in The Girls, a television series based on Skinner's Our Hearts Were Young and Gay. She departed the show after two months to appear with Helen Hayes in the play The Wisteria Trees, adapted from Anton Chekhov's The Cherry Orchard, by Joshua Logan.

=== Television ===
Leslie began working in television in the 1940s and frequently was a guest on the many anthology series popular in the early to mid-1950s, such as Studio One and Playhouse 90. She appeared with Ronald Reagan and Stafford Repp in the 1960 episode "The Way Home" of The DuPont Show with June Allyson. Later, she was one of the repertory of actors starring in The Richard Boone Show (1963–1964).

Leslie made three guest appearances on Perry Mason, and was featured as Perry's client in all three episodes. In 1958, she played Janet Morris in "The Case of the Fugitive Nurse" and Evelyn Girard in "The Case of the Purple Woman". In 1960, she played Sylvia Sutton in "The Case of the Wayward Wife". In 1962, she portrayed the part of Martha Hastings in the episode "The Long Count" on CBS's Rawhide. She guest-starred in many television series, including The Texan, Mackenzie's Raiders (as Lucinda Cabot in "The Lucinda Cabot Affair"), The Man from Blackhawk, Riverboat, Wanted: Dead or Alive (episode "Secret Ballot"), Trackdown, Bat Masterson, The Rifleman, The High Chaparral, Gunsmoke, Maverick, Pony Express, Stagecoach West, Bonanza, The Wild Wild West, Have Gun – Will Travel (in which she played a Chinese woman), and Wagon Train.

Her other credits were on drama series, such as Alfred Hitchcock Presents; Richard Diamond, Private Detective and The Fugitive, both starring David Janssen; The Eleventh Hour; The Lloyd Bridges Show; Mannix; Route 66 (episodes "The Layout at Glen Canyon" and "City of Wheels"); Straightaway; Bus Stop; Target: The Corruptors!; The Investigators; The Man and the Challenge; Adventures in Paradise; Ben Casey; One Step Beyond; Thriller and Empire. She became a regular on The Doctors when she took over the role of Maggie Powers after Ann Williams left the part. Leslie was also featured in the 1964 episode "The Fluellen Family" in Daniel Boone. She had recurring roles on Another World and All My Children and was featured in the television adaptations of In Cold Blood and Saint Maybe.

=== Writing ===
Leslie was the head writer for The Secret Storm in 1970. She also wrote episodes for Gunsmoke, Bracken's World, Barnaby Jones, McCloud, The New Land, Matt Helm, and Falcon Crest. In 1970, producer Howard Christie referred to Leslie as "a good actress who has turned into a fine scriptwriter."

== Filmography ==
=== Film ===
Bethel Leslie film credits
Year	Title	Role	Notes
1959	The Rabbit Trap	Abby Colt	
1963	Captain Newman, M.D.	Mrs. Helene Winston	
1965	A Rage to Live	Amy Hollister	
1970	The Molly Maguires	Mrs. Kehoe	
1979	Old Boyfriends	Mrs. Van Til	
1979	Beyond Death's Door		
1987	Ironweed	Librarian	
1999	Message in a Bottle	Marta	
1999	Uninvited	Mrs. Wentworth	

=== Television ===
Bethel Leslie film credits
Year	Title	Role	Notes
1958	Perry Mason	Janet Morris	Episode: "The Case of the Fugitive Nurse" (S1.E22)
1958	Perry Mason	Evelyn Girard	Episode: "The Case of the Purple Woman" (S2.E9)
1958	Maverick	Janet Kilmer	Episode: "The Thirty Ninth Star" (S2.E9)
1959	Wanted Dead or Alive	Carol Easter	Episode: "Secret Ballot" (S1.E24)
1959	Alcoa Presents: One Step Beyond	Mrs. Barrett	Episode: "The Riddle" (S1.E22, 1959-06-16)
1960	Alfred Hitchcock Presents	Mabel Graves	Episode: "The Man with Two Faces" (S6.E11)
1960	Perry Mason	Sylvia Sutton	Episode: "The Case of the Wayward Wife" (S3.E13)
1960	Wagon Train	Greta Halstadt	Episode: "The Joshua Gilliam Story" (S3.E25)
1960	Route 66	Jo Galloway	Episode: "Layout at Glen Canyon" (S1.E9)
1961	The Rifleman	Tess Miller	Episode: "Stopover" (S3.E31)
1961	Wagon Train	Helen Martin	Episode: "The Janet Hale Story" (S4.E35)
1962	Route 66	Lori Barton	Episode: "City of Wheels" (S2.E17)
1962	Bonanza	Ann Grant	Episode: "The Jackknife" (S3.E22)
1962	Rawhide	Martha Hastings	Episode: "The Long Count" (S4.E13)
1962	Gunsmoke	Rose Ellen	Episode: "The Summons" (S7.E29)
1963	Have Gun - Will Travel	Kim Sing and Jin Ho	Episode: "The Lady of the Fifth Moon" (S6.E29)
1963	Daniel Boone	Zerelda Fluellen	Episode: "The Family Fluellen" (S1.E4)
1963–1964	The Richard Boone Show	(various)	25 episodes
1964	The Fugitive	Marcie King	Episode: "Storm Center" (S1.E29)
1964	Gunsmoke	Elsa Poe	Episode: "Innocence" (S10.E12)
1965	The Defenders	Emily Yager	Episode: "The Merry-Go-Round Mender"
1965	Wagon Train	Mary Lee McIntosh	Episode: "The Miss Mary Lee McIntosh Story" (S8.E20)
1965–1968	The Doctors	Dr. Maggie Van Alen	116 episodes
1966	The Loner	Ellen Jameson	Episode: "Mantrap"
1968-1970	The Name of the Game	Celia	2 episodes
1969	The Virginian	Catherine Cantrell	Episode: "Women of Stone" (S8: E13)
1969	The Wild Wild West	Melanie Nolan	Episode: "The Night of the Sabatini Death"
1969	The High Chaparral	Annie Simmons	Episode: "No Bugles, No Drums"
1970	The Bold Ones: The New Doctors	Anita Hamilton	Episode: "This Day's Child"
1970-1973	Mannix	Lois Graham/Bev Miller	2 episodes
1971	Dr. Cook's Garden	Essie Bullitt	ABC Movie of the Week
1972	Kung Fu	Rita Coblenz	Episode: "The Passion of Chen Yi" (S2.E19)
1974	Owen Marshall, Counselor at Law	Martha Crane	Episode: "Etude for a Kidnapper"
1974	The New Perry Mason	Elinor Furley	Episode: "The Case of the Tortured Titan" (S1.E14)
1977	Visions	Mary	Episode: "Iowa"
1978	The White Shadow	Mrs. Lawrence	Pilot episode
1979	Insight	Karen	Episode: "A Slight Change in Plans"
1987	Long Day's Journey into Night	Mary Tyrone	Filmed live in Britain, shown on PBS
1987	The Equalizer	Woman on Street	Episode: "A Place to Stay" (S2.18)
1991–1992	All My Children	Claudia Conner	13 episodes
1994	One Life to Live	Ethel Crawford	
1995	Kansas	Mabel 'Nana' Farley	filmed in Australia for ABC
1996	Another World	Irma Murcer	2 episodes
1996	As the World Turns	Joan	Episode: 1996-06-10
1998	Saint Maybe	Mrs. Dulcimer	Hallmark Hall of Fame TV film

=== Scriptwriter ===
Bethel Leslie scriptwriter credits
Year	Title	Role	Notes
1970	Gunsmoke	Writer	Episode: "Sam McTavish M.D." (S16.E4)
1970	The Virginian	Writer	Episode: "Nightmare" (S8.E16)
1970–1971	The Secret Storm	Head Writer / Writer	
1974	McCloud	Writer	Episode: "The Gang That Stole Manhattan" (S5.E2)
1975	The Rookies	Writer	Episode: "Angel" (S3.E18)
1975	Matt Helm	Writer	Episode: "Now I Lay Me Down to Die," "Scavenger's Paradise" (S1.E2), (S1.E3)
1976	Electra Woman and Dyna Girl	Writer	Two episodes (S5.E2)
1976	Family	Writer	Two Episodes
1976	Swiss Family Robinson	Writer	Two Episodes
1977	Barnaby Jones	Writer	Episode: "Sister of Death" (S5.E11)
1979	A Christmas for Boomer	Writer	TV Movie
1982	Falcon Crest	Writer	Episode: "Victims" (S1.E10)

== Awards and recognition ==
Leslie was a regular on The Richard Boone Show, which garnered her an Emmy Award nomination for Outstanding Single Performance by an Actress in a Leading Role for her work in the episode "Statement of Fact." Media critic John Crosby wrote about Leslie's work in that anthology series, "During the season Bethel played everything from a seductive ax murderess to a dumb gangster's moll, to an Irish scrub woman, through a whole series of witchy mothers."

A poll of media critics and editors named her Most Promising New Talent in Radio Television Daily's 1963 All-American Favorites—Television.

Leslie's 1986 Broadway portrayal of a drug-addicted mother in Long Day's Journey into Night brought her a Tony Award nomination for Best Featured Actress.

== Personal life ==
Leslie was married to director Andrew McCullough. They had one child, daughter Leslie McCullough.

== Death ==
Bethel Leslie died of cancer at 70 in her apartment in Manhattan.

== Radio appearances ==
Year	Program	Episode/source
1952	Theatre Guild on the Air	The Wisteria Tree
1952	Grand Central Station	It Makes a Difference
