= Danger Street (1947 film) =

1947 film by Lew Landers

- Theatrical release poster
- Directed by: Lew Landers
- Screenplay by: Winston Miller; Kae Salkow; Maxwell Shane
- Story by: Winston Miller; Kae Salkow
- Produced by: William H. Pine; William C. Thomas
- Starring: Jane Withers; Robert Lowery; Bill Edwards; Elaine Riley; Audrey Young; Lyle Talbot; Charles Quigley
- Cinematography: Benjamin H. Kline
- Edited by: Howard A. Smith
- Music by: Darrell Calker
- Production company: Pine-Thomas Productions
- Distributed by: Paramount Pictures
- Release date: June 20, 1947
- Running time: 68 minutes
- Country: United States
- Language: English

Danger Street is a 1947 American mystery film directed by Lew Landers and written by Winston Miller, Kae Salkow and Maxwell Shane. The film stars Jane Withers, Robert Lowery, Bill Edwards, Elaine Riley, Audrey Young and Lyle Talbot. It was released on June 20, 1947, by Paramount Pictures.

== Cast ==
- Jane Withers as Pat Marvin
- Robert Lowery as Larry Burke
- Bill Edwards as Sandy Evans
- Elaine Riley as Cynthia Van Loan
- Audrey Young as Dolores Johnson
- Lyle Talbot as Charles Johnson
- Charles Quigley as Carl Pauling
- Lucia Carroll as Smitty
- Nina Mae McKinney as Veronica
- Vera Marshe as Amanda Matthews
- Roy Gordon as John Matthews
- Paul Harvey as Turlock
