= Bill Edwards (actor) =

American actor (1918–1999)

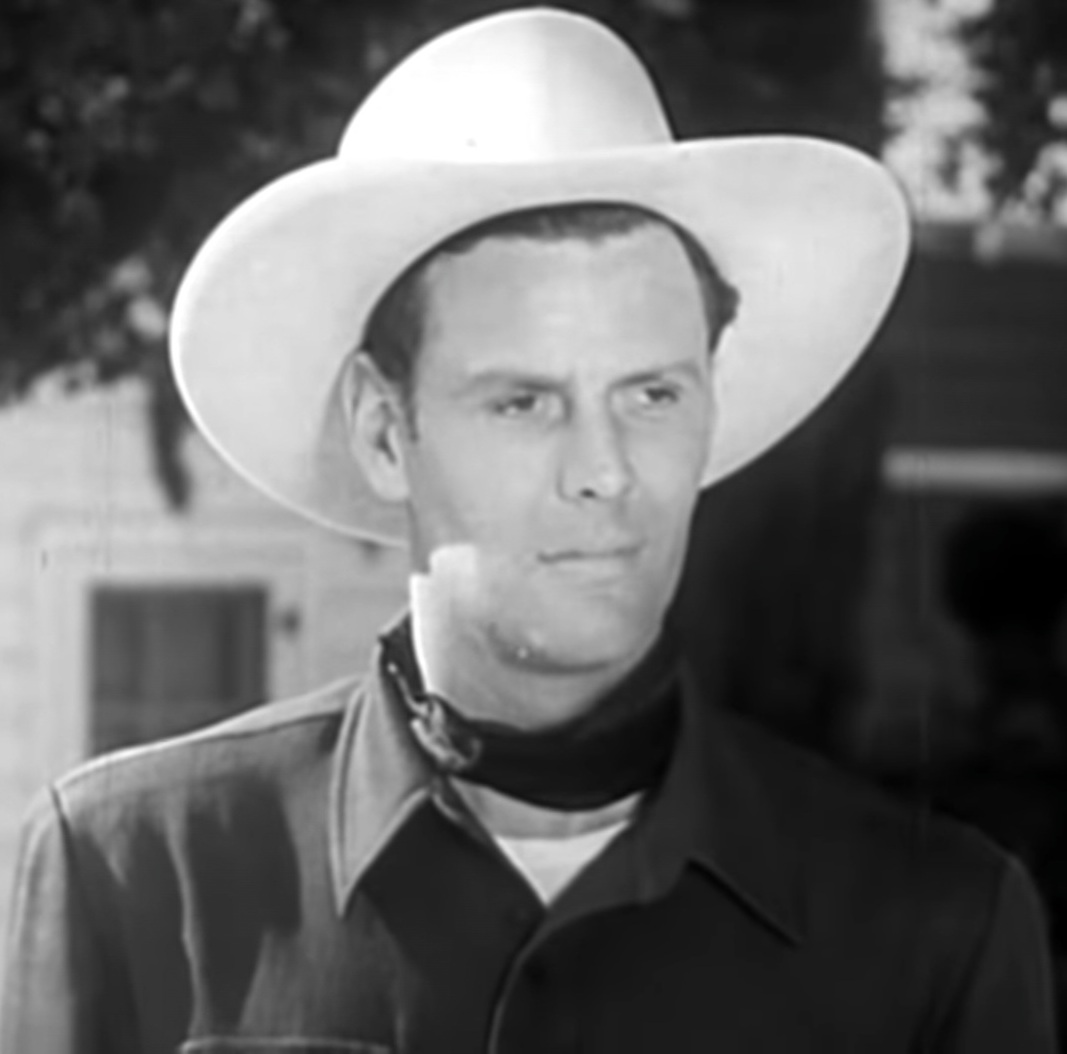
- Edwards in The Fighting Stallion (1950)
- Born: September 14, 1918; Sea Isle City, New Jersey, United States
- Died: December 21, 1999 (aged 81); Newport Beach, California, U.S.
- Occupations: Film, television actor, Artist
- Years active: 1938–1987
- Spouse: Hazel Allen
- Children: Linda Edwards

Bill Edwards (September 14, 1918 – December 21, 1999) was an American film and television actor, championship rodeo rider, and artist. His film roles include Hail the Conquering Hero, Our Hearts Were Young and Gay, and The Virginian. He is also known for his recurring role as Jonathan Kaye in the television series Hawaii Five-O.

He appeared in the 1961 episode of Danger Man entitled "The Girl Who Liked GI's" as Sgt. Poole.

== Selected filmography ==
- Adventure in Iraq (1943) as Radio Operator
- You Can't Ration Love (1944) as Pete Allen, big man on campus
- Hail the Conquering Hero (1943) as Forrest Noble
- Our Hearts Were Young and Gay (1944) as Tom Newhall
- Miss Susie Slagle's (1946) as Elijah Howe, Jr.
- The Virginian (1946) as Sam Bennett
- Our Hearts Were Growing Up (1946) as Tom Newhall
- Danger Street (1947) as Sandy Evans
- Home in San Antone (1949) as Ted Gibson
- Trail of the Yukon (1949) as Jim Blaine
- The Fighting Stallion (1950) as Lon Evans
- Federal Man (1950) as Agent George Palmer
- Border Outlaws (1950) as Mike Hoskins
- The First Legion (1951) as Joe
- Sea Hunt (1961, Season 4, Episode 19) as USCG Commander Murdock
- Tora! Tora! Tora! (1970) as Colonel Kendall J. Fiedler
- Hawaii Five-O (1972-1978) as Jonathan Kaye
- Inferno in Paradise (1974) as Captain Martin
