= The Eve Arden Show =

American television series

- Genre: Sitcom
- Created by: Emily Kimbrough (novel It Gives Me Great Pleasure)
- Starring: Eve Arden; Allyn Joslyn; Frances Bavier
- Theme music composer: Wilbur Hatch
- Country of origin: United States
- Original language: English
- No. of seasons: 1
- No. of episodes: 26

Production
- Producers: Al Lewis; Edmund Hartmann
- Production locations: Desilu, Culver City, California, United States
- Cinematography: Robert DeGrasse
- Editor: Dann Cahn
- Running time: 30 minutes
- Production companies: Westhaven Enterprises, in association with the CBS Television Network

Original release
- Network: CBS
- Release: September 17, 1957 – March 25, 1958

The Eve Arden Show is a 26-episode American sitcom which aired during the 1957–1958 season on CBS, alternately sponsored by Lever Brothers and Shulton, Inc.

== Overview ==
The show, starring Eve Arden, centers on Liza Hammond, a widowed mother of her twin daughters who works as writer and lecturer. It features actress Frances Bavier (the future Aunt Bee of The Andy Griffith Show) as Hammond's mother, Nora, who lives with the family. In eight of the 26 episodes, Allyn Joslyn portrays George Howell, Hammond's agent and potential love interest.

The series was produced for Arden's Westhaven Enterprises by Desilu. The show was filmed with three cameras in front of a live audience, although a laugh track was used for sweetening purposes. The show was based on author Emily Kimbrough's book It Gives Me Great Pleasure.

Eve Arden had enjoyed a successful run on radio in the CBS program Our Miss Brooks from 1948 to 1957. When it premiered as a television series in the fall of 1952, it was very popular with audiences and ran for four years on CBS. During its final season, the ratings fell and the show was canceled in the spring of 1956. In the fall of 1957, Desilu Studios, which had produced Our Miss Brooks, attempted to resurrect Arden's television career with The Eve Arden Show and CBS scheduled it for Tuesday nights. With this new program, Arden was not able to duplicate the success she had with Our Miss Brooks. Despite the fact that it followed The Phil Silvers Show (which during its first two years had been one of the top 30 programs on television), both sitcoms failed to beat their competition on ABC - Cheyenne (with Sugarfoot on alternate weeks) and The Life and Legend of Wyatt Earp. After the 1957–1958 season, The Phil Silvers Show was renewed for one more year but The Eve Arden Show ended its one-year run after its 26th episode. For the next several years, Arden continued to work on television as a guest star on several programs. Then, in 1967, Desi Arnaz brought her back to weekly television in an NBC sitcom co-starring singer-comedian Kaye Ballard called The Mothers-In-Law. The series was only moderately successful and lasted two years.

== Cast ==
- Eve Arden as Liza Hammond
- Allyn Joslyn as George Howell
- Frances Bavier as Nora (six episodes)
- Gail Stone as Jenny Hammond (seven episodes)
- Karen Greene as Mary Hammond (seven episodes)
- Willard Waterman as Carl Foster (four episodes)

Guest stars include Philip Ahn, Mary Jane Croft, Bill Goodwin, Mary Beth Hughes, Kathryn Card and Danny Richards, Jr., as Liza's nephew, Melvin.

== Episode list ==
Episode #	Episode title	Original airdate
1-1	"It Gives Me Great Pleasure" (pilot)	September 17, 1957
1-2	"Housework"	September 24, 1957
1-3	"Cover Girl"	October 1, 1957
1-4	"The French View"	October 8, 1957
1-5	"The New Liza Hammond"	October 15, 1957
1-6	"Local Girl"	October 22, 1957
1-7	"White Elephant Sale"	October 29, 1957
1-8	"Liza and the Bombshell"	November 5, 1957
1-9	"Liza Among the Courtrights"	November 19, 1957
1-10	"Jenny's Unrequited Love"	November 26, 1957
1-11	"Liza Hammond Enterprises"	December 3, 1957
1-12	"The Montana Date"	December 10, 1957
1-13	"Mary's First Date"	December 17, 1957
1-14	"The Christmas Angel"	December 24, 1957
1-15	"A Hotel Is Not A Home"	December 31, 1957
1-16	"Safari"	January 7, 1958
1-17	"The New Tenant"	January 14, 1958
1-18	"Liza's Reunion Dance"	January 21, 1958
1-19	"Mary's Report Card"	January 28, 1958
1-20	"The Hollywood Offer"	February 4, 1958
1-21	"The Rivals"	February 11, 1958
1-22	"Liza's Nightmare"	February 18, 1958
1-23	"Liza Meets Young Korea"	March 4, 1958
1-24	"Ed Weston Returns"	March 11, 1958
1-25	"Full Time Mother"	March 18, 1958
1-26	"Liza and the Harvard Man"	March 25, 1958

== DVD release ==
Four episodes of the series were released on Region 1 DVD on February 26, 2008 by Alpha Video.
