= Gloria Stroock =

American actress (1924–2024)

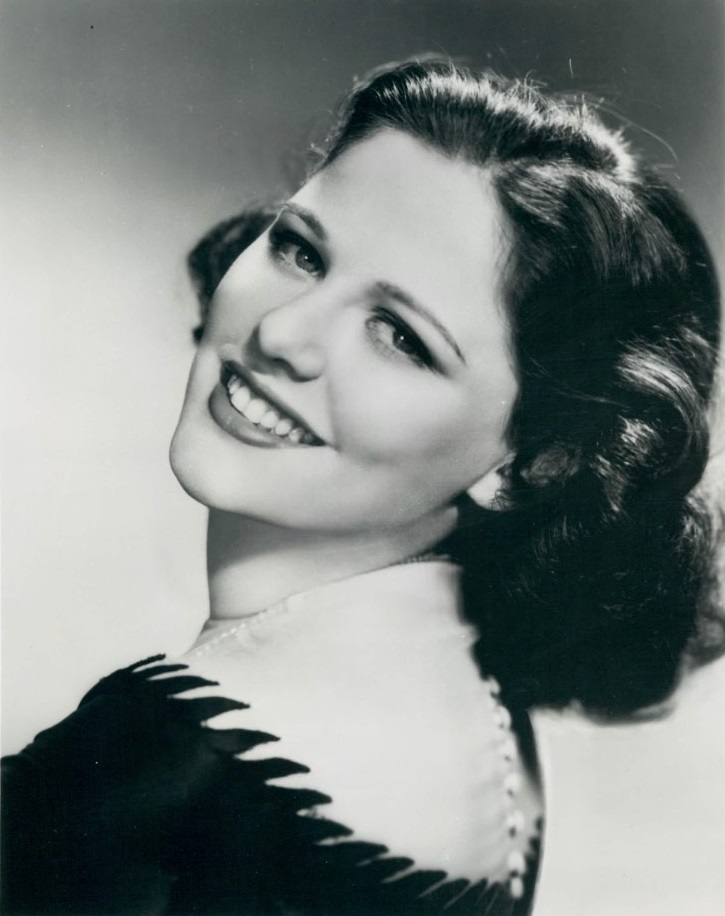
- Born: Gloria Jane Stroock; July 10, 1924; New York City, U.S.
- Died: May 5, 2024 (aged 99); Tucson, Arizona, U.S.
- Occupation: Actress
- Spouse: Leonard B. Stern (m. 1956; died 2011)
- Children: 2
- Relatives: Geraldine Brooks (sister)

Gloria Jane Stroock (July 10, 1924 – May 5, 2024) was an American actress. She had a supporting role in the television series McMillan & Wife as Maggie, the secretary of lead character Stewart McMillan.

== Early years ==
Stroock was born in New York City on July 10, 1924, as the daughter of James Stroock, president of Brooks Costume and Uniform Company, and his wife. Her mother, Bianca, designed contemporary costumes for Broadway plays. Stroock was the older sister of Geraldine Brooks, and both of them graduated from Julia Richman High School. Stroock studied dramatics at Syracuse University.

== Career ==
On television, Stroock portrayed Cornelia Otis Skinner in the CBS situation comedy The Girls (1950). She co-starred in "Person to Person", the November 7, 1950, episode of Armstrong Circle Theatre. Beginning on March 8, 1956, she was a panelist on the game show Down You Go. She had guest roles in television series such as Archie Bunker's Place, Baretta, Martin Kane, Private Eye, and Operation Petticoat.

Stroock signed with Paramount in 1946. She had supporting roles in films including The Competition and The Day of the Locust

Stroock's roles on Broadway included Joan Massuber in Oh, Brother (1945), Meg in Little Women (1945), and Polly Dalton in Cayden (1949). She also appeared in Truckline Cafe (1946).

== Personal life and death ==
On August 12, 1956, Stroock married Leonard B. Stern. They remained wed until his death in 2011; the couple had two children, Kate and Michael.

Stroock died at her son's home in Tucson, Arizona, on May 5, 2024, at the age of 99.

== Filmography ==
Year	Title	Role	Notes
1975	The Day of the Locust	Alice Estee	
1977	Fun with Dick and Jane	Mildred Blanchard	
1980	Seed of Innocence	Sophie, Danny's Mother	
1980	The Competition	Mrs. Dietrich	
1983	Uncommon Valor	Mrs. MacGregor	
1991	Missing Pieces	Woman at Concert	
1996	No Easy Way	Alice Jacobson	Final film role
