= Audrey Young =

American actress and singer (1922–2012)

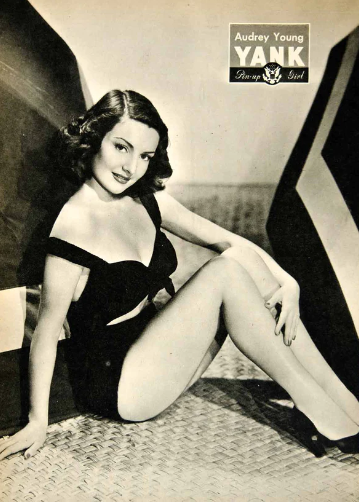
- Young in 1945
- Born: October 22, 1922; Los Angeles, California, U.S.
- Died: June 1, 2012 (aged 89); Los Angeles, California, U.S.
- Resting place: Westwood Village Memorial Park
- Occupations: Actress; singer
- Years active: 1943–1957
- Spouse: Billy Wilder (m. 1949; died 2002)

Audrey Young (October 30, 1922 – June 1, 2012) was an American film actress and a big-band singer who was most active in the 1940s. She was the wife of director Billy Wilder.

== Early years ==
Young was born in Los Angeles, California, Her father, Stratton Young, built sets for films.

== Career ==
Young was a contract actor with Paramount Pictures in the 1940s, appearing in approximately 20 films from 1944 to 1949. Her film debut came in Lady in the Dark (1944). She had sung with Tommy Dorsey's orchestra before becoming an actress, and she sang (either solo or as part of a group) in several films, including Blue Skies. Most of her roles were small and uncredited, with only a few exceptions like Danger Street and The Wistful Widow of Wagon Gap. Her final film appearance was in Love in the Afternoon (1957) in an uncredited role as the opera date of Gary Cooper's character.

On November 1, 1944, Young appeared on a Paramount Studios television variety program that was broadcast on station W6XYZ (later KTLA) in Los Angeles. She sang "What a Difference a Day Makes" and "Getting Sentimental Over You". In a review in the trade publication Billboard, Cy Wagner wrote that Young "had a nice voice and was very telegenic." She also sang in vaudeville.

Young worked as a costume consultant on two films, The Apartment and Some Like It Hot, both directed by her husband.

== Personal life ==
On June 30, 1949, Young married director Billy Wilder in Linden, Nevada. They first met when she appeared in a small role as a Cloak Room Attendant in The Lost Weekend and were married until his death in 2002. They had no children, but she was stepmother to Wilder's child from an earlier marriage. After Wilder's death, Young donated $5 million to the Hammer Museum at UCLA to create the Billy Wilder Theater. She was interred in the Westwood Village Memorial Park Cemetery in Los Angeles.
