= Diana Lynn =

American actress (1926–1971)

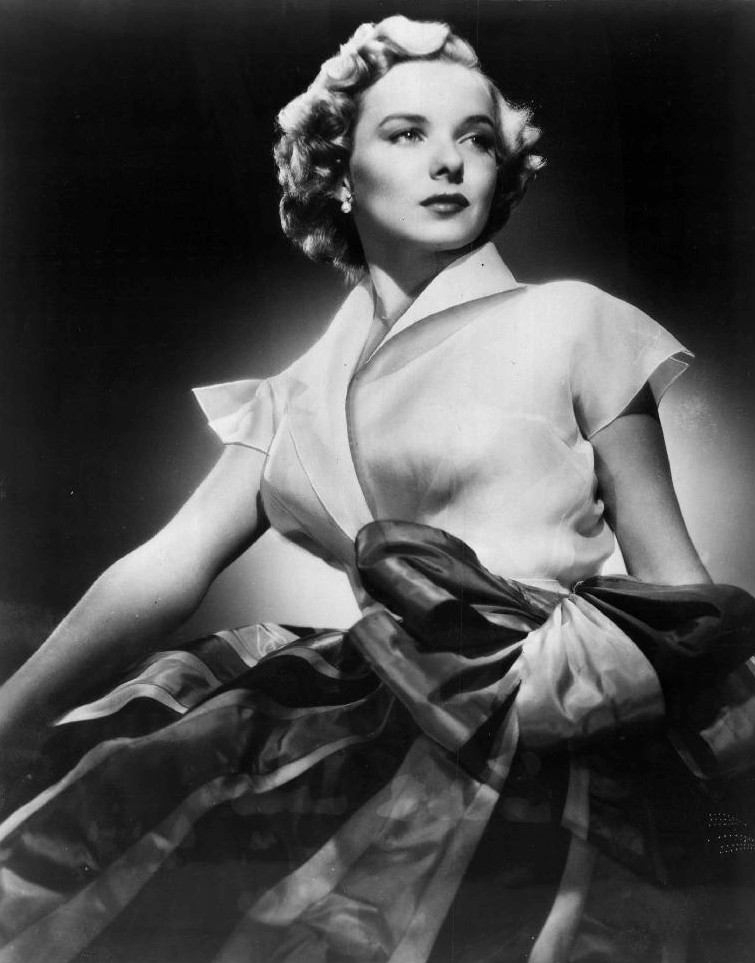
- Lynn in 1952
- Born: Dolores Eartha Loehr; July 5, 1926; Los Angeles, California, U.S.
- Died: December 18, 1971 (aged 45); Los Angeles, California, U.S.
- Resting place: Church of Heavenly Rest, New York
- Occupation: Actress
- Years active: 1939–1971
- Spouse(s): John C. Lindsey (m. 1948; div. 1953) Mortimer Hall (m. 1956)
- Children: 4, including Dolly Hall
- Awards: Hollywood Walk of Fame

Diana Marie Lynn (born Dolores Eartha Loehr, July 5, 1926 – December 18, 1971) was an American actress. She built her career by starring in Paramount Pictures films and various television series during the 1940s and 1950s. Two stars on the Hollywood Walk of Fame are dedicated to her name.

== Early years ==
Lynn was born in Los Angeles, California. Her father, Louis Loehr, was an oil supply executive, and her mother, Martha Loehr, was a concert pianist. Lynn was considered a child prodigy. She began taking piano lessons at age 4, and by the age of 12 was playing with the Los Angeles Junior Symphony Orchestra.

Lynn made her film debut playing the piano in They Shall Have Music and was once again back at the keyboard, accompanying Susanna Foster, in There's Magic in Music, when it was decided that she had more potential than she had been allowed to show. Paramount Pictures changed her name to "Diana Lynn" and began casting her in films that allowed her to show her personality and developed her skills as an actress.

Her comedic scenes with Ginger Rogers in The Major and the Minor were well received, and in 1944 she co-starred in Preston Sturges' The Miracle of Morgan's Creek with Betty Hutton. She appeared in two Henry Aldrich films and played writer Emily Kimbrough in two films Our Hearts Were Young and Gay and Our Hearts Were Growing Up both co-starring Gail Russell.

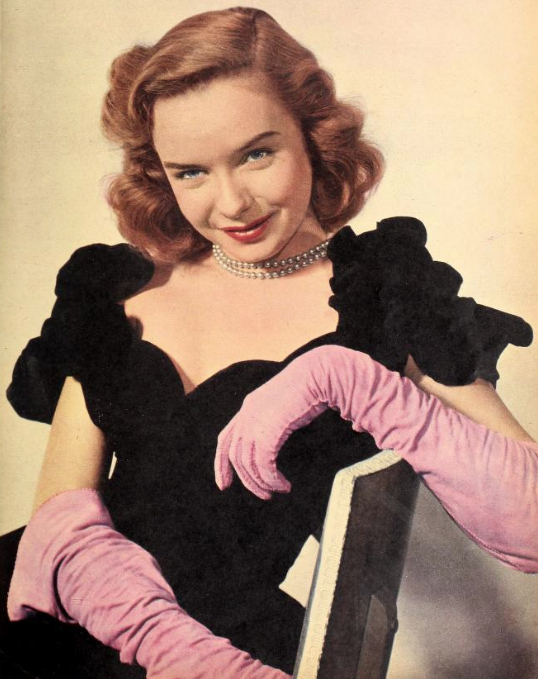
Lynn in 1946

After a few more films, she was cast in one of the year's biggest successes, the comedy My Friend Irma with Marie Wilson as Irma, and Dean Martin and Jerry Lewis in their film debuts. The group reprised their roles for the sequel My Friend Irma Goes West, and five years later Lynn was reunited with Martin and Lewis for one of their last films, You're Never Too Young.

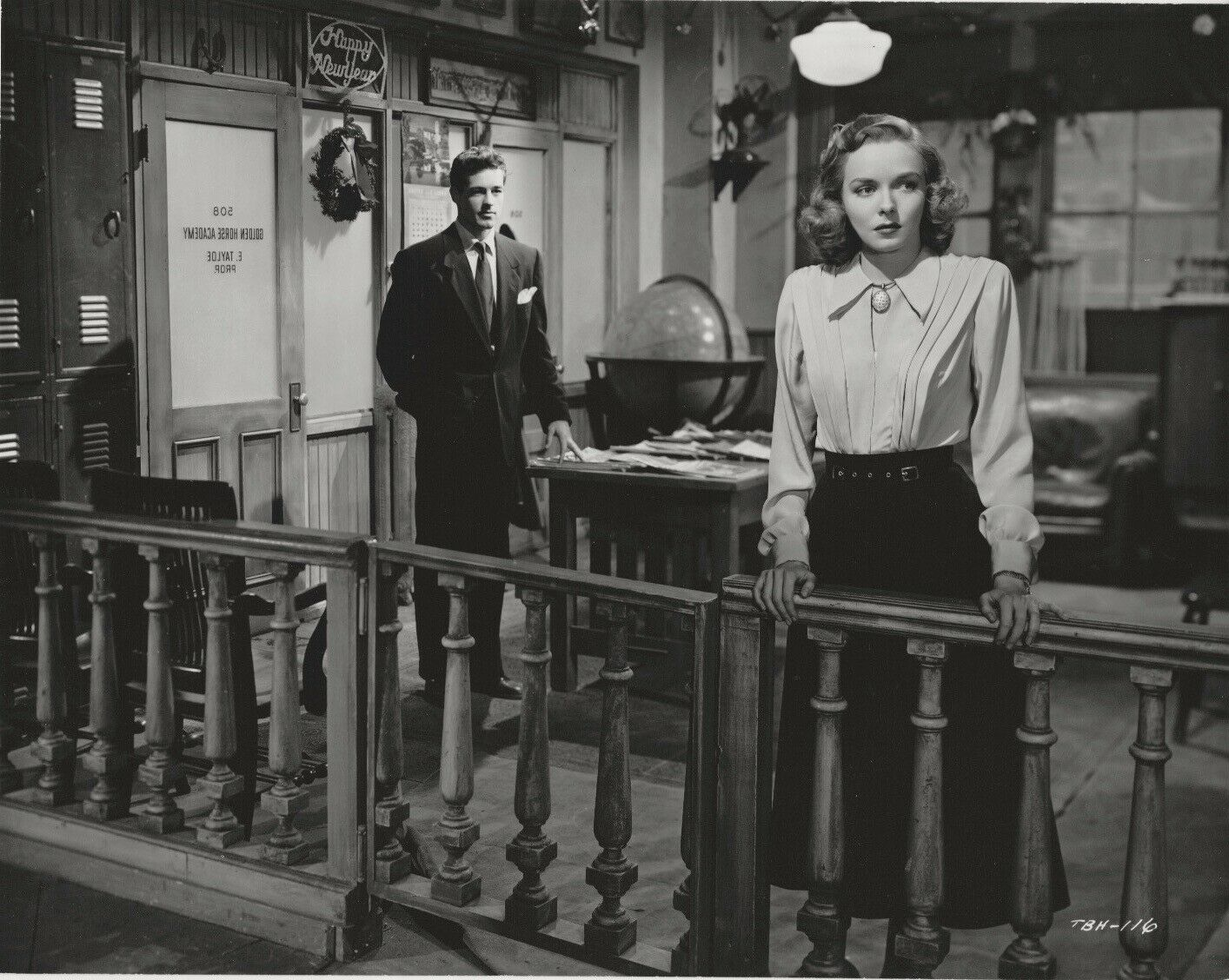
Guy Madison and Diana Lynn in Texas, Brooklyn & Heaven, 1948

During the 1950s, Lynn acted in a number of films, portraying Spencer Tracy's daughter in the crime drama The People Against O'Hara and the female lead in the much lampooned Bedtime for Bonzo opposite Ronald Reagan. Lynn co-starred as the schoolteacher in the 1955 film, The Kentuckian, starring Burt Lancaster and Walter Matthau.

She also had many TV leading roles during the 1950s, particularly in the middle years of the decade. As a solo pianist, she released at least one single on Capitol Records with backing by the Paul Weston orchestra.

== Stage ==
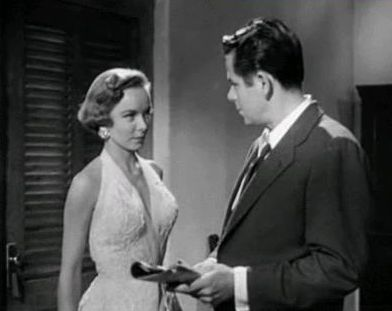
Diana Lynn and Glenn Ford in Plunder of the Sun, 1953

In 1964, Lynn had a six-month stint on Broadway, replacing Barbara Bel Geddes in Mary, Mary. In the early 1950s, she starred with Maurice Evans in The Wild Duck on Broadway.

She also starred in runs of The Moon Is Blue in the United States and the United Kingdom.

== Recordings ==
In 1947, a three-record album of Lynn's piano playing included Mozart's Rondo, Laura, and Body and Soul.

== Later years ==
She acted frequently in television guest roles throughout the 1960s. By 1970, she had relocated to New York City, where she was running a travel agency. She appeared in Company of Killers, a film made for television. Paramount then offered her a part in a new film, Play It as It Lays, and after some consideration, Lynn accepted the offer and moved back to Los Angeles.

In 1968, Lynn invited her friend Mart Crowley to housesit for her while she was out of town. While at her house over those five weeks, Crowley wrote the majority of his groundbreaking play about LGBT life in America, The Boys in the Band.

== Personal life ==
Lynn married architect John C. Lindsay December 18, 1948; they divorced in June 1953. In 1956 Lynn married Mortimer Hall, son of New York Post publisher Dorothy Schiff.

Lynn's daughter Dolly Hall is a film producer.

Another daughter, Margaret "Daisy" Hall, is an alumna of the Emma Willard School for Girls in Troy, New York, and as an actress, has starred in numerous French- and lesser-known American-produced films, during the 1980s, '90s, and 2000s.

== Death ==
Before filming started on Play It as It Lays, Lynn suffered a stroke and died on December 18, 1971, at the age of 45. Lynn was cremated. A funeral service was held at Church of the Heavenly Rest in New York City, and a memorial service was held at All Saints' Episcopal Church in Beverly Hills, California.

== Legacy ==
In 1942, Parents magazine named Lynn "the most talented juvenile actress." She has two stars on the Hollywood Walk of Fame: for motion pictures, at 1625 Vine Street and for television at 6350 Hollywood Boulevard.

== Partial filmography ==
- They Shall Have Music (1939) – Pianist (uncredited)
- The Hard-Boiled Canary (1941) – Dolly Loehr
- The Major and the Minor (1942) – Lucy Hill
- Star Spangled Rhythm (1942) – Herself (uncredited)
- Henry Aldrich Gets Glamour (1943) – Phyllis Michael
- The Miracle of Morgan's Creek (1944) – Emmy Kockenlocker
- And the Angels Sing (1944) – Josie Angel
- Henry Aldrich Plays Cupid (1944) – Phyllis Michael
- Our Hearts Were Young and Gay (1944) – Emily Kimbrough
- Out of This World (1945) – Betty Miller
- Duffy's Tavern (1945) – Diana Lynn
- The Bride Wore Boots (1946) – Mary Lou Medford
- Our Hearts Were Growing Up (1946) – Emily Kimbrough
- Easy Come, Easy Go (1947) – Connie Donovan
- Variety Girl (1947) – Diana Lynn
- Ruthless (1948) – Martha Burnside / Mallory Flagg
- Texas, Brooklyn & Heaven (1948) – Perry Dunklin
- Every Girl Should Be Married (1948) – Julie Howard
- My Friend Irma (1949) – Jane Stacey
- Paid in Full (1950) – Nancy Langley
- Rogues of Sherwood Forest (1950) – Lady Marianne de Beaudray
- My Friend Irma Goes West (1950) – Jane Stacey
- Peggy (1950) – Peggy Brookfield
- Bedtime for Bonzo (1951) – Jane Linden
- The People Against O'Hara (1951) – Virginia 'Ginny' Curtayne
- Meet Me at the Fair (1952) – Zerelda Wing
- Plunder of the Sun (1953) – Julie Barnes
- Track of the Cat (1954) – Gwen Williams
- An Annapolis Story (1955) – Peggy Lord
- You're Never Too Young (1955) – Nancy Collins
- The Kentuckian (1955) – Susie Spann
- Company of Killers (1970, TV Movie) – Edwina DeSalles (final film role)

== Television ==
- The Investigators (1961) – episode "In a Mirror, Darkly"
- Checkmate (1961) – episode "Juan Moreno's Body"

== Radio appearances ==
Year	Program	Episode/source
1952	Theatre Guild on the Air	"The Silver Whistle"
1953	Theatre Guild on the Air	Quiet Wedding
