= The Girls (TV series) =

American TV sitcom (winter 1950)

- Genre: Sitcom
- Directed by: David Rich; Frank Schaffner
- Starring: Bethel Leslie; Gloria Stroock; Mary Malone; Kenneth Forbes
- Country of origin: United States
- No. of seasons: 1
- No. of episodes: 13

Production
- Producer: Carol Irwin

Original release
- Network: CBS
- Release: January 1 – March 25, 1950

Related
- Our Hearts Were Young and Gay

The Girls is an American situation comedy television series that was broadcast on CBS from January 1, 1950, until March 25, 1950.

The Girls was based on the book Our Hearts Were Young and Gay by Cornelia Otis Skinner and Emily Kimbrough. In the series, Skinner and Kimbrough, having recently graduated from college and having had a European vacation, share a Greenwich Village apartment in the Roaring Twenties while they pursue careers as actress and writer, respectively. Episodes depict "their struggles, mishaps, and disappointments". The series's original title, Young and Gay, was changed after two episodes.

Bethel Leslie originally portrayed Skinner. When she left to be in a play, Gloria Stroock replaced her in that role. Mary Malone played Kimbrough, and Kenneth Forbes played Todhunter Smith II.

The Girls was broadcast live at 7 p.m. Eastern Time on Sunday nights, replacing Tonight on Broadway. It lasted for 13 episodes. The producer was Carol Irwin, and the directors were David Rich and Frank Schaffner. It originated at WCBS. Irwin had a disagreement with Skinner and Kimbrough that almost caused the show's cancellation in early February 1950, but they resolved the problem.

== Critical response ==
Sam Chase, in a review of the premiere episode in the trade publication Billboard, wrote that Malone and Leslie "showed a charming combination of naivete and determination not to be swayed by the temptations of the times." Chase also complimented the development of the characters.
