= And the Angels Sing =

1944 film by George Marshall

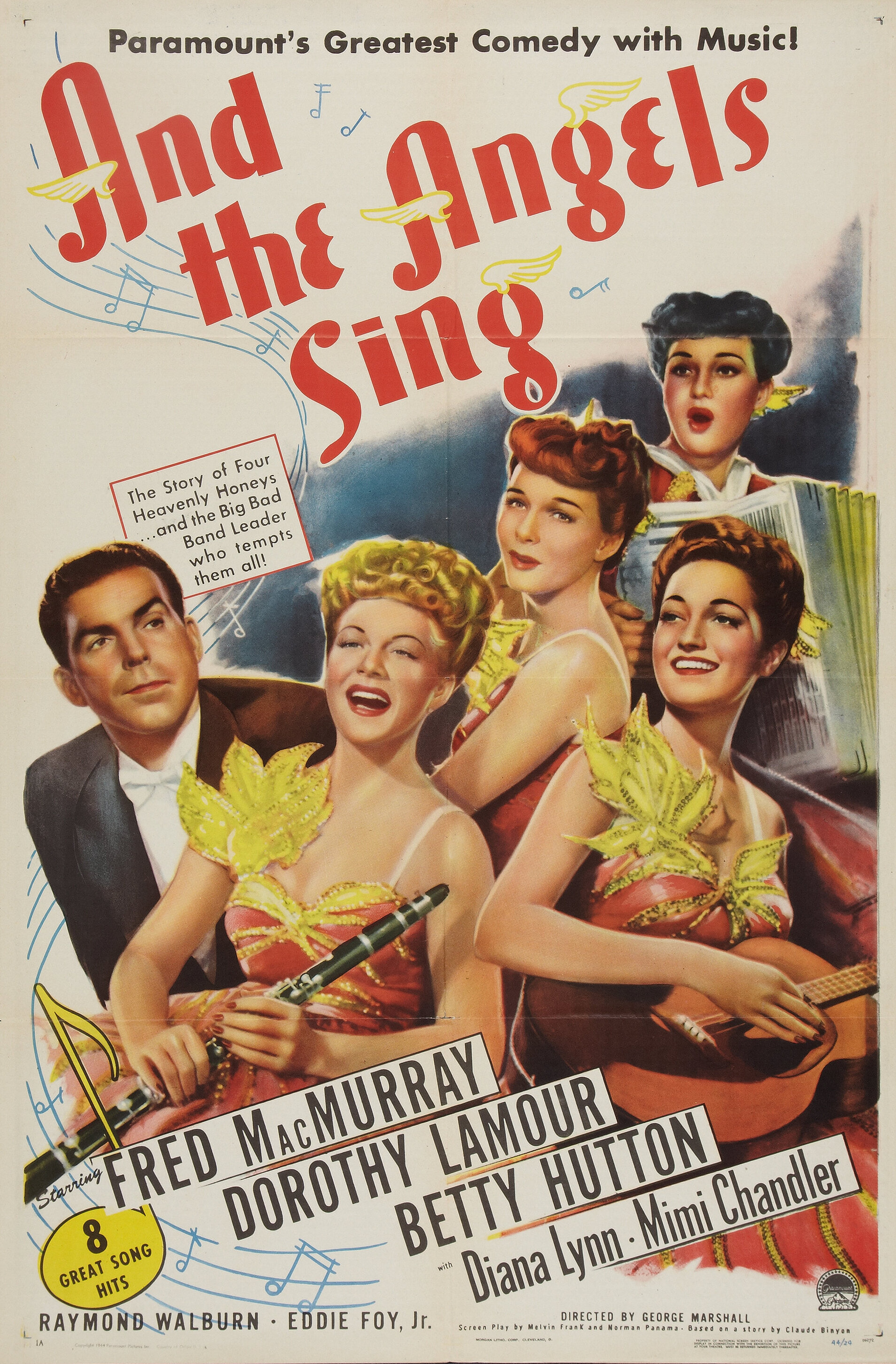
- Theatrical release poster
- Directed by: George Marshall
- Written by: Claude Binyon; Melvin Frank; Norman Panama
- Starring: Dorothy Lamour; Betty Hutton; Fred MacMurray; Diana Lynn; Mimi Chandler
- Cinematography: Karl Struss
- Edited by: Eda Warren
- Music by: Victor Young; James Van Heusen; Johnny Burke
- Production company: Paramount Pictures
- Distributed by: Paramount Pictures
- Release date: July 12, 1944
- Running time: 96 minutes
- Country: United States
- Language: English

And the Angels Sing is a 1944 American musical comedy film directed by George Marshall and starring Fred MacMurray, Dorothy Lamour, and Betty Hutton, with Diana Lynn, Mimi Chandler, Raymond Walburn and Eddie Foy Jr. Produced and released by Paramount Pictures, it is a remake of the 1938 musical comedy, Sing You Sinners, starring Bing Crosby, Fred MacMurray and Donald O'Connor.

And The Angels Sing is a classic example of a film written to capitalize on the title of a previously popular song, in this case Benny Goodman's 1939 number one hit, "And the Angels Sing" with music by Ziggy Elman, lyrics by Johnny Mercer and sung by Martha Tilton. The song's melody is featured in the opening credits but not sung in the film.

The standout original songs in the musical were "It Could Happen To You", sung by Dorothy Lamour, which quickly became a pop standard, and "His Rocking Horse Ran Away", which became one of Betty Hutton's most popular numbers.

== Plot ==
In the quiet town of Glenby Falls, the four angel sisters, Nancy, Bobby, Josie and Patty live with their father, Pop. Patty, Josie and Nancy all have jobs and together, the sisters dedicate their earnings to help Pop save to buy a farm. However, Bobby is unemployed. After looking for jobs around town, Bobby organises for her and her sisters to sing at a roadhouse for $10. Initially, the other sisters refuse as they hate singing, but Pop convinces them too.

When the sisters arrive at the roadhouse, the sleazy bandleader, Happy Marshall, hits on Nancy. However, she refuses his advances. After the sisters perform, Nancy and Bobby quarrel and the sisters leave without her. Bobby decides to gamble with her sisters’ money. Happy and his band find out they’ve been offered a gig at the prestigious Copacabana nightclub in New York City. However, Happy disappoints his elated band members when he reveals the band is out of money and cannot afford to travel to New York. Bobby’s gambling is successful and she turns the $10 into $190.

Bobby finds herself attracted to Happy, which he uses to manipulate her into giving him the $190. As Happy and the band prepare to leave for New York, he spots Bobby, who has become intoxicated, and decides to drive her home. A drunk Bobby latches onto Happy, causing him to crash the car into the Angel’s backyard.

Happy runs away after the crash and rejoins his band. After Nancy discovers Bobby and gets the story out of her, the four sisters rush to New York to get their money back. At the Copacabana, Nancy seduces Hoiman, a shifty man who gets her into the club. When Nancy confronts Happy, a bouncer attempts to remove her, but Happy punches him and convinces Nancy to go out with him.

Happy explains his situation to Nancy and she falls for him. After doing a “wine dance” at a club, Nancy becomes drunk. When Nancy arrives back at the hotel, Bobby becomes enraged and confronts Happy herself. Happy tells Schultz, the owner of the Copacabana, to pay the sisters $190 and deduct the money from his salary. But Schultz only agrees to on the condition that the sisters perform at the club that night. When Bobby confronts Happy, he toys with her emotions to get her sisters to perform. Bobby manages to get her sisters to agree and they perform at the club.

After the performance, Schultz alters his deal and forces Happy to sign the sisters to a contract. Nancy refuses to sign the contract, but Happy proposes to her so she agrees. Bobby is attracted to Happy and he pretends to like her as well so she’ll sign the contract. Bobby misinterprets Happy and believes that he is proposing to her, which she accepts. When Bobby and Nancy find out they are both engaged to Happy, the two sisters break off their engagements.

Instead of returning to Glenby Falls, the Angels decide to move to New York so they can pursue their dream jobs. Some time passes and the sisters’ careers haven’t taken off and the family is running out of money. Meanwhile, Happy’s band has broken up. To make ends meet, Happy and Fuzzy perform as folk dancers. The Angels find out about the pair’s act and confront them in hopes of finally getting their $190.

Happy and Fuzzy criticise Pop’s parenting and the three men join to spank the sisters. The sisters agree to sing with Happy and he reunites the band. After a performance, conveniently, Bobby falls for Fuzzy, leaving Nancy and Happy to rekindle their relationship.

== Cast ==
- Dorothy Lamour as Nancy Angel
- Betty Hutton as Bobby Angel
- Diana Lynn as Josie Angel
- Mimi Chandler as Patti Angel
- Raymond Walburn as Pop Angel
- Fred MacMurray as Happy Marshall
- Eddie Foy Jr. as Fuzzy
- Frank Albertson as Oliver
- Mikhail Rasumni as Schultz
- Frank Faylen as Hoiman (uncredited)
- Harry Barris as Saxy (uncredited)
- Julie Gibson as Cigarette Girl (uncredited)

== Soundtrack ==
- "And The Angels Sing" — (Written by Ziggy Elman and Johnny Mercer)
- "For The First Hundred Years" — (Written by Johnny Burke and Jimmy Van Heusen) Performed by Dorothy Lamour, Betty Hutton, Diana Lynn and Mimi Chandler
- "Bluebirds In My Belfry — (Written by Johnny Burke and Jimmy Van Heusen) Performed by Betty Hutton
- "My Hearts Wrapped Up In Gingham" — (Written by Johnny Burke and Jimmy Van Heusen) Performed by Fred MacMurray
- "It Could Happen To You" — (Written by Johnny Burke and Jimmy Van Heusen) Performed by Dorothy Lamour
- "Knocking On Your Own Front Door" — (Written by Johnny Burke and Jimmy Van Heusen) Performed by Dorothy Lamour, Betty Hutton, Diana Lynn and Mimi Chandler
- "His Rocking Horse Ran Away" — (Written by Johnny Burke and Jimmy Van Heusen) Performed by Betty Hutton
- "When Stanislaus Got Married" — (Written by Johnny Burke and Jimmy Van Heusen) Performed by Fred MacMurray and Eddie Foy Jr.
- "How Does Your Garden Grow?" — (Written by Johnny Burke and Jimmy Van Heusen) Performed by Dorothy Lamour, Betty Hutton, Diana Lynn and Mimi Chandler

== Production ==
The film was originally titled "Four Angels" but was changed to And The Angels Sing after Paramount bought the rights to the name of the song. Cole Porter was originally meant to write the songs.

Filming was meant to begin in April, 1943 but was delayed as Cully Richards enlisted in the army and a replacement had to be sought. Doodles Weaver was also cast, in the role of Hoiman but he was removed from the cast and replaced by Frank Faylen. Filming took place from May to June 1943.

== Release and reception ==
The film opened at the Paramount Theatre in New York City on July 12th, 1944, with a stage show headed by Perry Como and Jerry Wald with his orchestra.

Time wrote, "From [the start of] Happy's two-timing, [it] gets more & more complicated and less & less funny. Too much of this dizzy story shows signs of hard labor; about half is rather enjoyable. Betty Hutton gets funnier with every picture. She is the most startling expression of natural force since the Johnstown Flood.

Bosley Crowther of The New York Times wrote, "Paramount has labored more than somewhat to bring forth a whacky comedy of a sort it habitually inclines to in "And the Angels Sing." It has taken a story by Claude Binyon—one he must have thought up on a day off—and let a couple of writers torture a screen play out of it. It has tossed in a handful of fair songs by James Van Hausen and Johnny Burke and given the lot to a scratch cast headed by Betty Hutton, Fred MacMurray and Dorothy Lamour. "

The Motion Picture Herald said, "The piece is musical comedy with more than a fair sprinkling of farce, without too much reason... Mixups are plentiful, sometimes funny and occasionally not so. Finally the girls band together as a crooning group, and prove their success in a singing scene on a cafe set, but big."

== See also ==
- List of American films of 1944
