= The Wistful Widow of Wagon Gap =

1947 film by Charles Barton

- Theatrical Poster
- Directed by: Charles Barton
- Written by: John Grant; Frederic I. Rinaldo; Robert Lees
- Based on: The Wistful Widow of Wagon Gap by William Bowers; D. D. Beauchamp
- Produced by: Robert Arthur
- Starring: Bud Abbott; Lou Costello; Marjorie Main; Audrey Young
- Cinematography: Charles Van Enger
- Edited by: Frank Gross
- Music by: Walter Schumann
- Color process: Black-and-white
- Production company: Universal International Pictures
- Distributed by: Universal International Pictures
- Release date: October 8, 1947
- Running time: 78 minutes
- Language: English
- Budget: $778,000
- Box office: $2,625,000 or $2.4 million (US rentals)

The Wistful Widow of Wagon Gap is a 1947 American comedy Western film directed by Charles Barton and starring the comedy team of Abbott and Costello alongside Marjorie Main and Audrey Young. It was released on October 8 and distributed by Universal-International.

== Plot ==
Chester Wooley and Duke Egan are traveling salesmen who make a stopover in Wagon Gap, Montana while en route to California. During the stopover, a notorious criminal, Fred Hawkins, is murdered, and the two are charged with the crime. They are quickly tried, convicted, and sentenced to die by hanging. The head of the local citizen's committee, Jim Simpson, recalls a law whereby the survivor of a gun duel must take responsibility for the deceased's debts and family. The law spares the two from execution, but Chester is now responsible for the widow Hawkins and her seven children. They go to her farm, where Chester is worked by Mrs. Hawkins from dawn to dusk. To make matters worse, Chester must work at the saloon at night to repay Hawkins' debt to its owner, Jake Frame. Her plan is to wear Chester down until he agrees to marry her.

Chester quickly learns that no one will harm him, for fear that they will have to support Mrs. Hawkins and her family. Simpson makes Chester the sheriff in hopes that the fear of him will help clean up the lawless town. For protection, Chester carries around a photograph of Mrs. Hawkins and her kids. The approach works for a while, and Chester is heralded as a hero. Meanwhile, Duke still plans to go to California and tries to get Judge Benbow to marry Mrs. Hawkins, in order to free him and Chester from their obligations. He starts a rumor that Mrs. Hawkins is about to become rich once the railroad buys her land to lay tracks. The rumor takes on a life of its own, with everyone trying to kill Chester in hopes of marrying Mrs. Hawkins (and becoming wealthy in the process). Frame eventually confesses to Hawkins' murder; Duke and Chester are cleared and allowed to leave town, but not before they admit that the railroad rumor was fabricated by them. Benbow still wants to marry Mrs. Hawkins, and she agrees. She then announces that the railroad actually did offer her substantial money, and she is now wealthy.

== Cast ==
- Bud Abbott as Duke Egan
- Lou Costello as Chester Wooley
- Marjorie Main as Widow Hawkins
- Audrey Young as Juanita Hawkins
- George Cleveland as Judge Benbow
- Gordon Jones as Jake Frame
- William Ching as Jim Simpson
- Peter M. Thompson as Phil (as Pete Thompson)
- Bill Clauson as Matt Hawkins
- Billy O'Leary as Billy Hawkins
- Pamela Wells as Sarah Hawkins
- Jimmy Bates as Jefferson Hawkins
- Paul Dunn as Lincoln Hawkins
- Diane Florentine as Sally Hawkins
- Glenn Strange as Lefty
- Rex Lease as Hank
- Ethan Laidlaw as Cowboy (uncredited)
- Charles King as Gunman (uncredited)
- George J. Lewis as Cowpuncher (uncredited)
- Emmett Lynn as Old Codger (uncredited)
- Kermit Maynard as Posse Member
- Zon Murray as Cowpuncher (uncredited)

== Production ==
The film was based on a story by Bill Bowers and Buc Beauchamp which was based on a true life law from Montana that if you killed a man, you were responsible for their widow and children. Bowers says they worked on it for two hours, envisioning it as a vehicle for James Stewart and Marjorie Main, and sold it to Universal for $2,500.

The Wistful Widow of Wagon Gap was filmed from April 29 through June 20, 1947. The film was budgeted at $750,000 - a new lower figure set for Abbott and Costello movies. It went $28,000 over.

On May 3, during production of this film, Costello dedicated the Lou Costello Jr. Youth Center in memory of his son in Los Angeles. Less than a week later, on May 9 his father, Sebastian Cristillo, died of a heart attack. Costello blamed their agent, Eddie Sherman, for upsetting his father the night before (triggering the heart attack) and fired him. The team went without an agent for two years.

== Comic book ==
The first issue of the Abbott and Costello comic book, published in February 1948 by St. John Publishing, was an adaptation of the film. Out of the forty issues published between 1948 and 1956, this was the only one that was based on one of their films.

== Routines ==
Included is a variation on the Oyster routine used previously in 1945's Here Come the Co-Eds, this time using a frog.

Main puts her own spin on the "clubhouse" gambling routine, attributing her prowess at poker and ability to throw a man to her dead husband - saying "Hawkins", just as Costello would cite the clubhouse where he heard boys shouting gambling lingo for a dice game he would claim not to know how to play.

== Home media ==
Universal first released the film on VHS tape in 1992 and then on DVD through two releases. The first time, in The Best of Abbott and Costello Volume Two set, on May 4, 2004, and again on October 28, 2008, as part of Abbott and Costello: The Complete Universal Pictures Collection.
