= Charles Montgomery Skinner =

American writer (1852–1907)

Charles M. Skinner
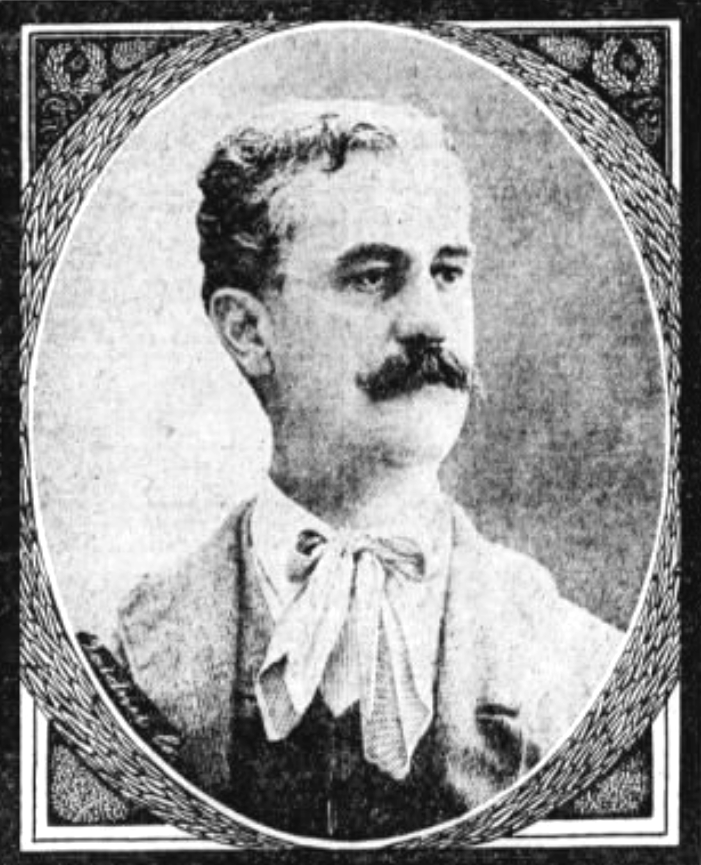
- Born: March 15, 1852; Victor, New York, US
- Died: December 20, 1907 (aged 55); Proctorsville, Vermont, US
- Occupation: Writer
- Spouse: Ada Blanchard (m. 1876)
- Relatives: Otis Skinner (brother)
- Writing career
- Subjects: Folklore; Natural History

Charles Montgomery Skinner (March 15, 1852 – December 20, 1907) was an American writer.

== Newspaper career ==
Skinner was born in Victor, New York, but his family moved to Cambridge, Massachusetts, a year after his birth. When Skinner was 14, the family moved to Hartford, Connecticut. His father was a Universalist minister. By 1881 Skinner had moved to New York City and secured a position as a reporter with the Brooklyn Times. In 1884, he joined to the editorial staff of the Brooklyn Eagle where he remained until his death. His study of the paper's famed Walt Whitman appeared in the Atlantic Monthly in 1903.

== Writings ==
Skinner published collections of myths, legends and folklore from across the United States, including its territories, and North America. Skinner hoped that America's progress would transform the nation's few legends into few but great ones — "as time goes on the figures seen against the morning twilight of our history will rise to more commanding stature." He hoped to combine folklore conventions with New England transcendentalism to keep alive traditions endangered by the industrial age. The first of these works, the two-volume Myths and Legends of Our Own Land (1896), was heavily promoted by its publisher and went through five printings the first year it was available. This was followed by a collection of folktales from Mexico and Canada in 1899 and then one covering U.S. possessions in the Caribbean and Pacific in 1900 and an additional two volumes in 1903. Skinner was not formally trained as a folklorist and he included a wide range of legends, including tales attributed to Native Americans, Revolutionary War stories, and a wide variety of ghost stories.

Skinner also authored several plays, including Villon, the Vagabond, which he wrote for his brother, Otis. Skinner's other interests included the seasons, especially as they changed inside of industrializing cities. In order to improve the urban environment, he authored a guide to gardening and urban beautification. He also commented on turn-of-the-century America's turbulent economy in Workers and the Trusts and American Communes. His other contributions to American literature included works of natural history such as With Feet to the Earth and Do-Nothing Days.

== List of works ==
- Charles M. Skinner, Myths And Legends of Our Own Land two volumes (Philadelphia: J.B. Lippincott Company, 1896).
- Charles M. Skinner, Nature in a City Yard (New York: The Century, 1897).
- Charles M. Skinner, With Feet to the Earth (Philadelphia: J. B. Lippincott Company, 1898).
- Charles M. Skinner, Do-Nothing Days (Philadelphia: J. B. Lippincott Company, 1898).
- Charles M. Skinner, Myths and Legends Beyond Our Borders (Philadelphia: J. B. Lippincott Company, 1899).
- Charles M. Skinner, Myths and Legends of Our New Possessions and Protectorates (Philadelphia: J. B. Lippincott Company, 1900).
- Charles M. Skinner, Flowers in the Pave (Philadelphia: J. B. Lippincott Company, 1900).
- Charles Skinner, Workers and the Trusts: Labor Conditions in the Great Manufacturing Centers of the United States (Brooklyn: Brooklyn Daily Eagle, 1900).
- Charles Skinner, American Communes: Practical Socialism in the United States (Brooklyn: Brooklyn Daily Eagle, 1901).
- Charles M. Skinner, American Myths and Legends two volumes (Philadelphia: J. B. Lippincott Company, 1903).
- Charles M. Skinner, Little Gardens: How to Beautify City Yards and Small Country Spaces (New York: D. Appleton, 1904).
- Charles M. Skinner, Myths and Legends of Flowers, Trees, Fruits and Plants (Philadelphia: J. B. Lippincott Company, 1911).
