= Cornelia Otis Skinner =

American actress and author

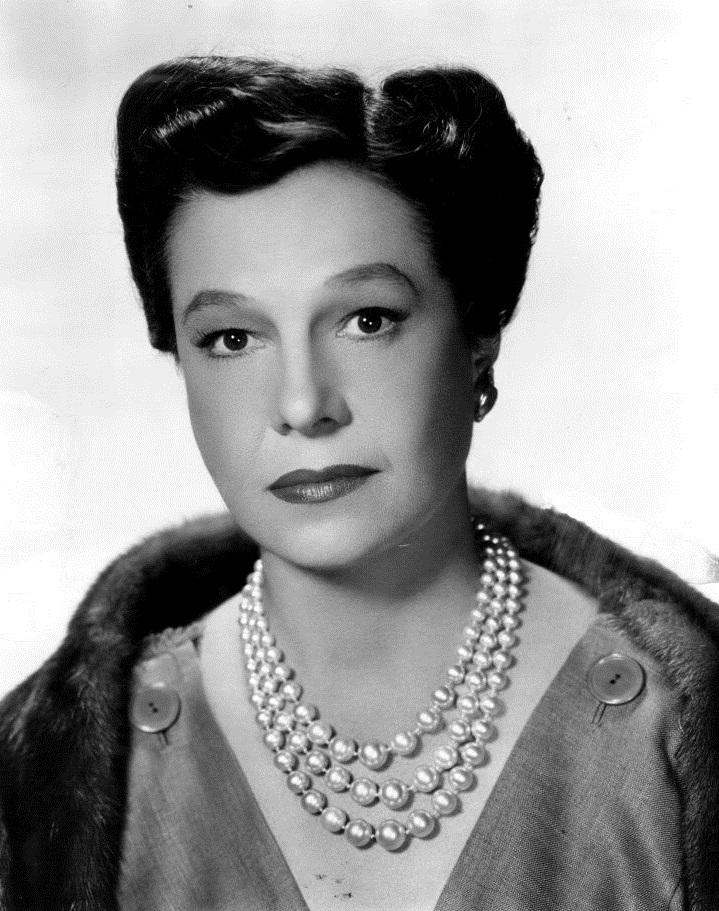
- Skinner in 1955
- Born: May 30, 1899; Chicago, Illinois
- Died: July 9, 1979 (aged 80); New York, New York
- Occupations: Actress, humorous essayist, playwright, screenwriter
- Years active: 1920–1970
- Spouse: Alden Sanford Blodget (1928–1964; his death)
- Children: 1
- Parent(s): Otis Skinner; Maud Durbin

Cornelia Otis Skinner (May 30, 1899 – July 9, 1979) was an American writer and actress.

== Biography ==
Skinner was born on 30 May 1899 in Chicago, Illinois as the only child of actor Otis Skinner and actress Maud Durbin. After attending the all-girls' Baldwin School and Bryn Mawr College (1918–1919), and studying theatre at the Sorbonne in Paris, Skinner made her professional stage debut on September 20, 1921 as Dona Sarasate in Tom Cushing's Blood and Sand at Broadway's Empire Theatre. She appeared in several plays before embarking on a tour of the United States from 1926 to 1929 in a one-woman performance of short character sketches which she had written. She also wrote numerous short, humorous pieces for publications such as The New Yorker. These pieces were eventually compiled into a series of books, including Nuts in May, Dithers and Jitters, Excuse It Please!, and The Ape in Me.

In a "comprehensive study" of Skinner's work, G. Bruce Loganbill (1961) refers to Skinner's scripts as "monologue-dramas," which were extensions of the "linked monologues" developed by Ruth Draper. Skinner's work differed in structure and content, however, as she created and performed full-length monologue-dramas that were based on the lives of historical figures. Such work was described as a "unique" and important contribution to the one-person show in America.

She starred in successful production of George Bernard Shaw's "Candida" in 1939, that toured venues in cities such as Cleveland before opening on Broadway.

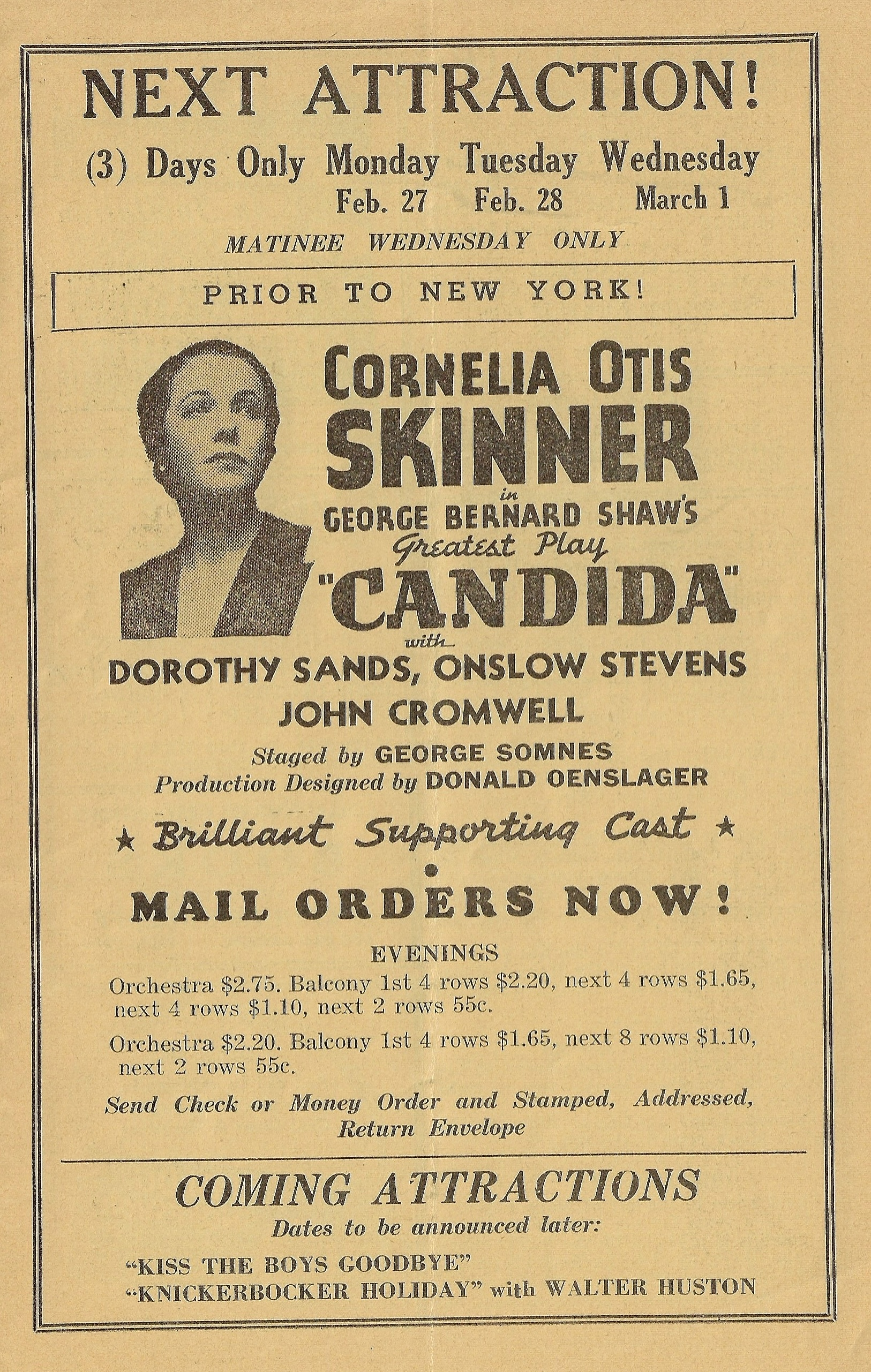

She appeared with Orson Welles on The Campbell Playhouse radio play of "American Cavalcade: The Things We Have" on May 26, 1939.

With Emily Kimbrough, Skinner wrote Our Hearts Were Young and Gay, a light-hearted description of their European tour after college. Kimbrough and Skinner went to Hollywood to act as consultants on the film adaptation of the book, produced as a film of the same name, with Gail Russell playing Skinner. The book was also adapted as a 1950 television series The Girls, in which Skinner was portrayed by Bethel Leslie (replaced by Gloria Stroock).

In 1952, Skinner's one-woman show Paris '90 (music and lyrics by Kay Swift) premiered on Broadway. An original cast recording was produced by Goddard Lieberson for Columbia Records, and is now available on compact disc. In later years Skinner wrote Madame Sarah (a biography of Sarah Bernhardt), and Elegant Wits and Grand Horizontals about the Belle Epoque.

In a 1944 conversation with Victor Borge, Skinner reportedly told the Danish comedian that she decided to drop the term "diseuse" from her act after reading in a Scottish newspaper: "Cornelia Otis Skinner, the American disease, gave a program last night."

In 1964, Skinner toured in a production of The Irregular Verb to Love with Cyril Ritchard, James Coco, and Robert Drivas, including a stop at the oldest Summer stock theater, Denver's Elitch Theatre.

=== Marriage ===
Cornelia Otis Skinner married Alden Sanford Blodget on October 5, 1928 in Warm Springs, Virginia. On August 28, 1930, she gave birth to her only child, a son, Otis Skinner Blodget, who died on March 11, 2007, aged 76.

== Performance ==
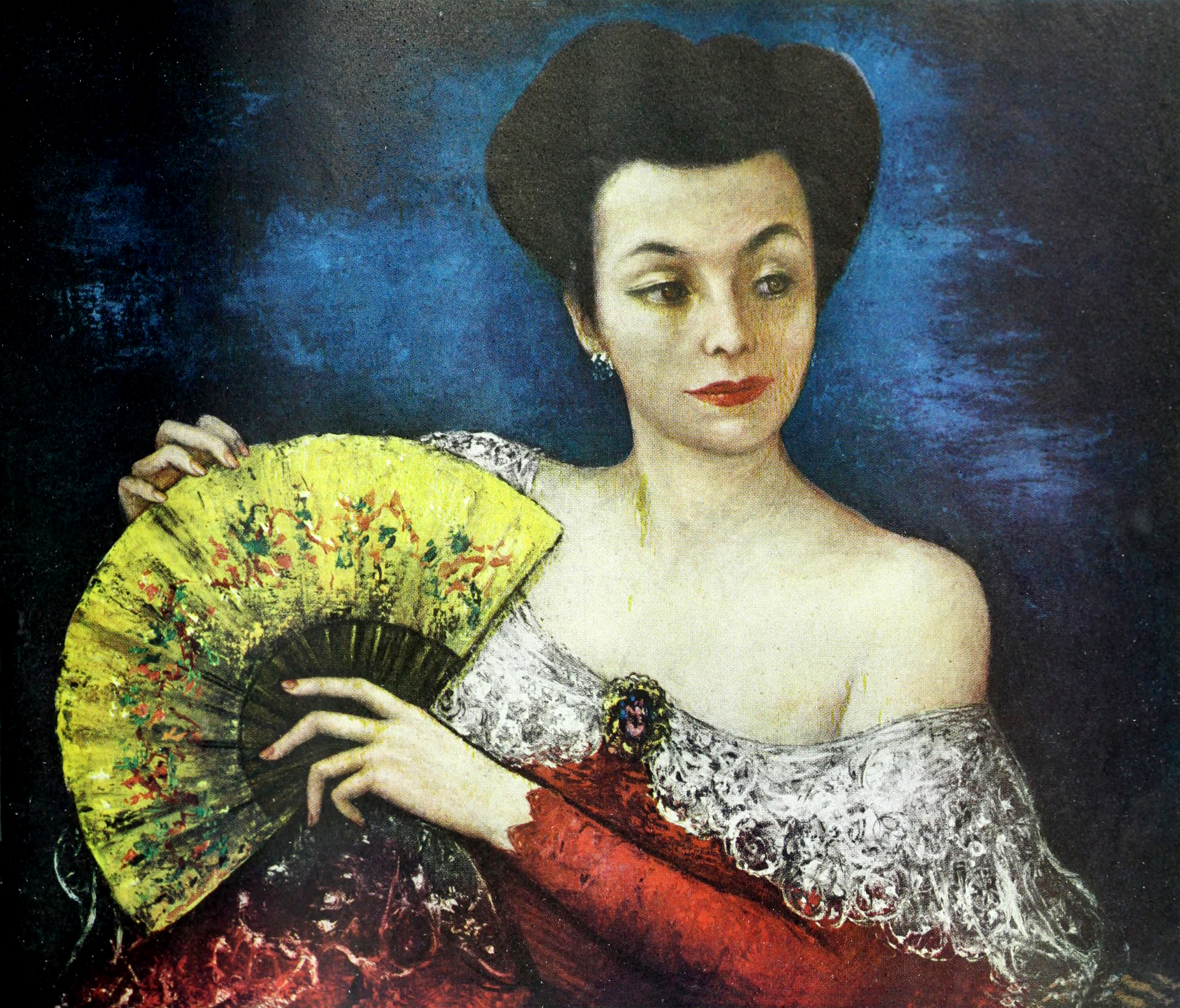
Portrait of Cornelia Otis Skinner by Gladys Rockmore Davis

=== As an actress ===
==== Stage ====
- Blood and Sand (1921, Empire Theatre, New York) - (as Dona Sarasate). Professional debut. With Otis Skinner.
- Tweedles (1923, Frazee Theatre, Broadway) - (as Mrs. Ricketts).
- Paris '90 (1952, Golden Theatre, New York City) - (as 13 various characters) Original cast recording by Columbia Records, 1952.
- The Pleasure of His Company (1958, Longacre & Music Box Theatres, New York City) – (as Katharine Dougherty). With Cyril Richard and George Peppard.

==== Radio ====
- The Campbell Playhouse: The Things We Have (An American Cavalcade) (1939, CBS, radio drama: episode dated 26 May 1939) - (as 5 different roles). With Orson Welles and Agnes Moorehead. Produced by Welles and John Houseman.

==== Film ====
- The Uninvited (1943, Paramount Pictures) - (as Miss Holloway). With Ray Milland and Ruth Hussey.
- The Girl in the Red Velvet Swing (1955, Charles Brackett/20th Century Fox) - (as Mrs. Thaw). With Ray Milland and Joan Collins.
- The Swimmer (1968, Horizon Pictures) - (as Mrs. Hammar). With Burt Lancaster and Janet Lundgard.

==== Television ====
- Max Liebman Presents: Dearest Enemy (1955, NBC, musical play) - (as Mrs. Murray). With Anne Jeffreys and Cyril Richard. A musical TV play adapted by Neil Simon from the 1925 Broadway production with book by Herbert Fields, music and lyrics by Lorenz Hart and Richard Rogers.
- The Alcoa Hour (1956, NBC, Episode: "Merry Christmas, Mr. Baxter") - (as Susan Baxter). With Margaret Hamilton.
- The Farmer's Daughter (1962, NBC, movie) - (as Mrs. Morley). With Peter Lawford and Lee Remick.

=== As herself ===
==== Film ====
- Stage Door Canteen (1943, Principal Artists/United Artists)

==== Television ====
- Toast of the Town (later The Ed Sullivan Show) episodes #4.7 (1950), #4.14 (1950), #5.32 (1952), and #7.8 (1953)
- Faye Emerson's Wonderful Town (1951), episode dated June 23, 1951
- General Electric Guest House (1951, episode dated July 1, 1951)
- What's It For? (1957) episode dated October 12, 1957
- What's My Line? (1959) episode dated March 29, 1959
- This Is Your Life (1959) Charlie Ruggles (episode)

== Works ==
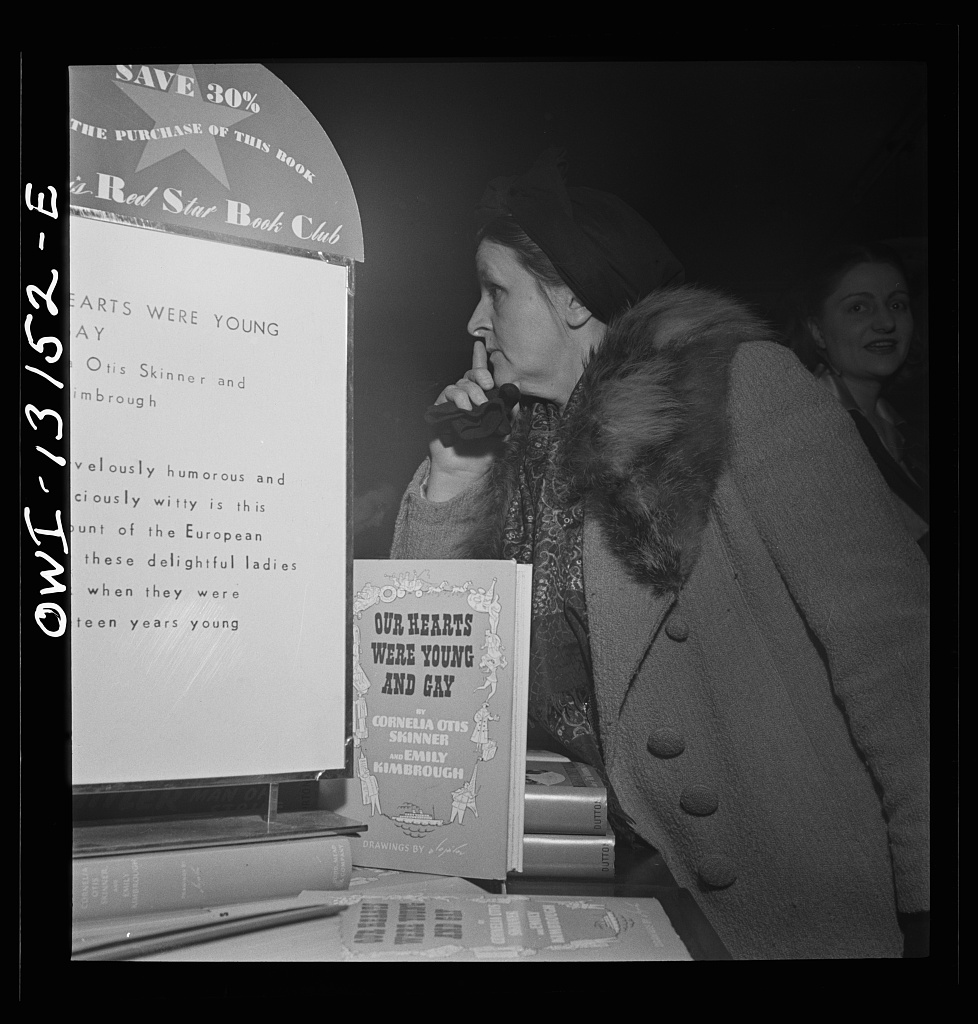
Our Hearts Were Young and Gay on display at Macy's (December 1942)

=== Non-fiction ===
Essay compilations

(All published by Dodd, Mead, and Co., New York, except where noted.)

- Tiny Garments (1932) - drawings by A. Winter.

(Essays originally published in The New Yorker, and other magazines.) Farrar and Rinehart, Inc., publishers, New York.

- Excuse It, Please! (1936) - illustrations by Otto Soglow.

(18 essays originally published in The New Yorker, and possibly in Harper’s Bazaar, Vogue, The Ladies’ Home Journal, Good Housekeeping, Theatre Arts Monthly, The New York Times, Stage, Country Life, You and Chatter.)

- Dithers and Jitters (1937) - drawings by Constantin Alajalov.

(16 essays originally published in The New Yorker, and possibly in Harper’s Bazaar, Vogue, The Ladies’ Home Journal, Good Housekeeping, Theatre Arts Monthly, The New York Times, Stage, Country Life, You and Chatter.)

- Soap Behind the Ears (1941) - drawings by Constantin Alajalov.

(10 essays originally published in The New Yorker, and possibly in Harper’s Bazaar, Vogue, The Ladies’ Home Journal, Good Housekeeping, Theatre Arts Monthly, The New York Times, Stage, Country Life, You and Chatter.)

- Popcorn (1943) - illustrations by Otto Soglow and Constantin Alajalov.

Constable & Sons, Ltd., London.

- That's Me All Over (1948) – illustrations by Constantin Alajalov.

(47 essays from the compilations of 1932, 1936, 1937, and 1941. Originally published in The New Yorker, Harper’s Bazaar, Vogue, The Ladies’ Home Journal, Good Housekeeping, Theatre Arts Monthly, The New York Times, Stage, Country Life, You and Chatter.)

- Nuts in May (1950) - drawings by Constantin Alajalov.

(13 essays. All but one, "Seaweed Sewer," originally published by The New Yorker.)

- Bottoms Up! (1955) - drawings by Constantin Alajalov.

(12 essays. Only original publisher listed is The New Yorker for two titles: "Those Starring Days" and "Crying in the Dark.")

- The Ape in Me (1959) - drawings by Constantin Alajalov.

(12 essays. 8 essays originally published by The Reader's Digest, 1 by The Ladies' Home Journal, 1 by The New York Times Magazine, and 2 by unknown.)
Memoirs

- Our Hearts Were Young and Gay (with Emily Kimbrough, 1942).

Dodd, Mead and Co., New York.

- Family Circle (1948) – an autobiographical work.

Houghton Mifflin Co., Boston. (Entitled Happy Family in the UK; 1950, Constable, London.)

- "Those Friends of His" (1950) – humorous autobiographical piece from The New Yorker..

History

- Elegant Wits and Grand Horizontals (1962) – a history of "la Belle Époque" in Paris.

Houghton Mifflin Co., Boston.
Biographies

- Madame Sarah (1967) – a biography of Sarah Bernhardt.

Houghton Mifflin Co., Boston.

- Life with Lindsay and Crouse (1976) – a biography of the playwright duo Howard Lindsay and Russel Crouse.

Houghton Mifflin Co., Boston.

=== Playwriting ===
Plays

- Captain Fury (1925) – her first play; written for her father, Otis Skinner.
- Edna, His Wife (1937) – play based on the 1935 novel of the same name by Margaret Ayer Barnes.
- The Pleasure of His Company (with Samuel Taylor, 1958) – play (adapted as a film in 1961).

Monologues

- The Wives of Henry VIII (1931)
- The Empress Eugenie (1932)
- The Loves of Charles II (1933)
- The Mansion on the Hudson (1935)

=== Screenwriting ===
- The Girls (1950) – TV series.
