= Otis Skinner =

American stage actor (1858–1942)

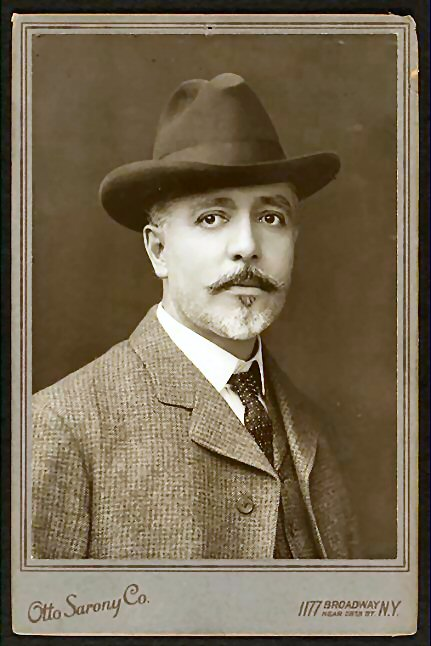
- An illustration of Skinner, c. 1900-1910
- Born: Otis A. Skinner; June 28, 1858; Cambridge, Massachusetts, U.S.
- Died: January 4, 1942 (aged 83); New York City, U.S.
- Resting place: Woodstock, Vermont, U.S.
- Occupations: Actor, writer
- Spouse: Maud Durbin (m. 1895; died 1936)
- Children: Cornelia Otis Skinner

Signature
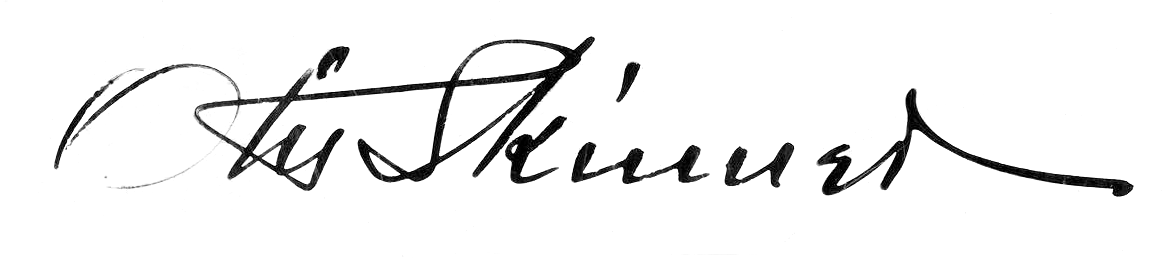

Otis A. Skinner (June 28, 1858 – January 4, 1942) was an American stage actor active during the late 19th and early 20th centuries.

== Early life and education ==
Skinner was born in Cambridge, Massachusetts, on June 28, 1858, the middle of three boys raised by Charles and Cornelia Skinner. He was later brought up in Hartford, Connecticut where Charles Skinner served as a Universalist minister. The household valued scholarship and art, with Charles known for his sermons and Cornelia was a landscape painter. His older brother, Charles Montgomery Skinner, became a noted journalist and critic in New York, while his younger brother William was an artist.

Skinner was educated in Hartford with an eye towards a career in commerce but a visit to the theater left him stage-struck. He secured his father's blessing for a theatrical career, and his father not only approved but also obtained from P. T. Barnum an introduction to William Pleater Davidge. Davidge employed him with the Museum Stock Company in Philadelphia for $8 per week, and Skinner's career was launched. In the latter half of the 1870s, he played various bit roles in stock companies, and alongside stars such as John Edward McCullough. He built up his repertoire for several years in Philadelphia, New York City, and Boston, including three years with Lawrence Barrett.

== Career ==
By the mid-1880s, he was touring first with Augustin Daly, then, in 1889, with the troupe of Edwin Booth and Helena Modjeska. After that season, he played Romeo in London opposite Margaret Mather. His association with Mather lasted two years; after, with Booth dead, he returned to Modjeska, starring opposite her in her most famous roles. He also originated the role of Schwartz in Hermann Sudermann's Magda, and played Armand in Dumas's Camille.

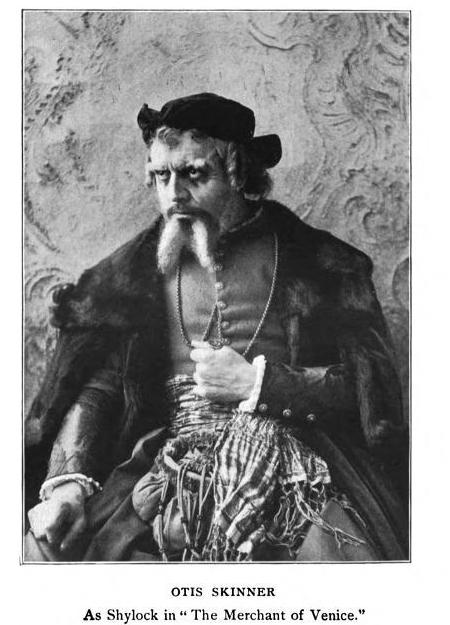
Skinner as Shylock

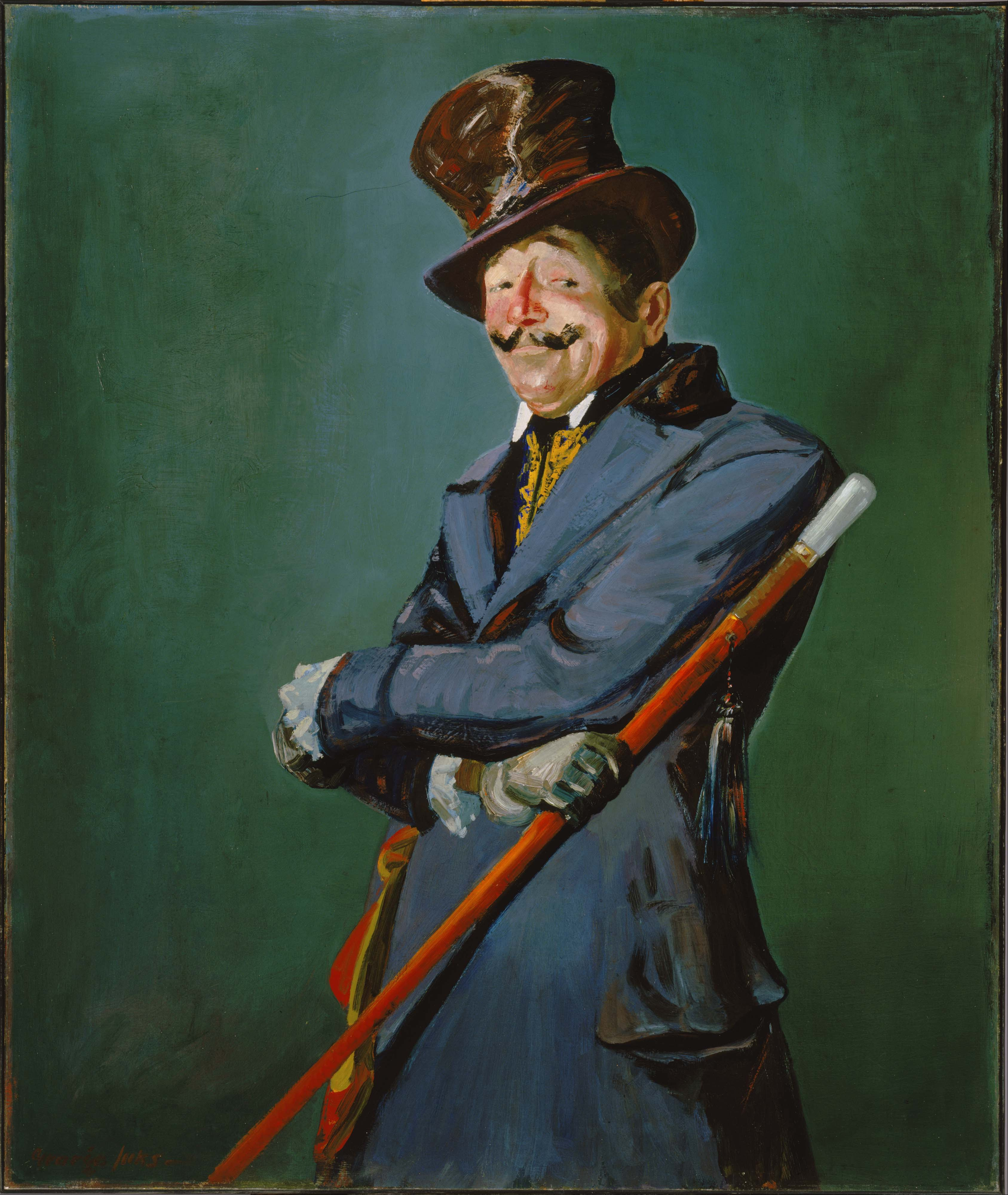
Otis Skinner as Col. Philippe Bridau, a 1919 portrait by George Luks

By the mid-1890s, he was a star in his own right. In 1894, he produced and starred in Clyde Fitch's His Grace de Grammont; the same year, he performed in his brother's translation of Victor Hugo's Le roi s'amuse. In 1895 in Chicago, he succeeded as Hamlet. From 1895, he was associated with the troupe of Joseph Jefferson.

He excelled in Shakespearean roles, including Shylock, Hamlet, Richard III and Romeo, and his Colonel Phillipe Brideau in The Honor of the Family was considered one of the greatest comedic performances of the first quarter of the 20th century. Skinner's signature role was as Hajj the beggar in Kismet (1911) on Broadway, and he continued playing it on stage for twenty years, recreating his performance both in the 1920 and 1930 film versions of the play.

His later roles included Tony Comaradino in Booth Tarkington's Mister Antonic (1917), Albert Mott in Humpty Dumpty (1918), Juan Gallardo in Blood and Sand (1921), the title role in Sancho Panza in Melchior Lengyel's adaptation of Don Quixote (featuring Lucille Kahn in a supporting role), Sir John Falstaff in both Henry IV, part 1 (1926) and The Merry Wives of Windsor (1928), and Shylock opposite the Portia of Maude Adams (1931–32) in The Merchant of Venice.

Skinner was a successful writer whose books included Footlights and Spotlights and Mad Folk of the Theatre. In 1902, he turned Mary Hartwell Catherwood's novel Lazarre (1901) into a successful stage play.

Skinner's daughter Cornelia Otis Skinner, who became an actress and writer, was born in 1899. Otis Skinner was portrayed onscreen by Charlie Ruggles in the film version of Cornelia's book Our Hearts Were Young and Gay.

He was a devout Episcopalian and a member of the Episcopal Actors Guild.

== Death ==
On January 4, 1942, Skinner died at his home in New York City, nearly a month after he had fallen ill while attending a benefit performance of The Wookey at the Plymouth Theatre, now the Gerald Schoenfeld Theatre. He had last appeared on stage in 1935, reciting the Forward in a revival of George M. Cohan's Seven Keys to Baldpate. Actress Maud Durbin, his wife for over forty years, died on Christmas Day in 1936.
