= Maud Durbin =

American actress (1871–1936)

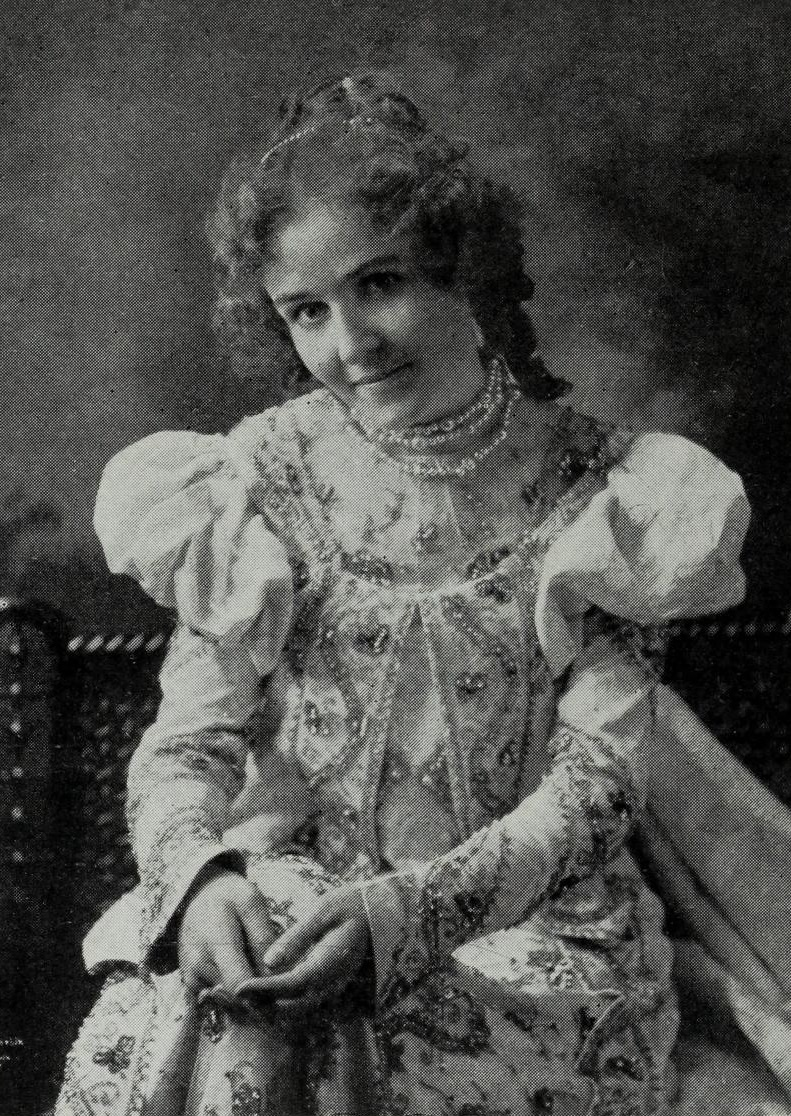
1898 photo of Maud Durbin, American actress and author.

Maud Durbin (November 9, 1871 – December 25, 1936) was an American actress. She was the wife of actor Otis Skinner and the mother of actress and author Cornelia Otis Skinner.

Durbin was born in Moberly, Missouri, on November 9, 1871. A protégé of Helena Modjeska, she was touring in the Booth-Modjeska Dramatic Company when she met actor Otis Skinner, who went on to form his own dramatic company, which included Durbin, and they married in 1895. Maud Durbin was also a writer, and was the author of Pietro, as well as the published short stories The Ne'er to Return Road and Tom's Little Star.

Durbin died in New York City on December 25, 1936. She was buried at River Street Cemetery in Woodstock, Vermont, where she and her husband had a summer home.
