= Our Hearts Were Young and Gay =

1942 book by Cornelia Otis Skinner and Emily Kimbrough

- First edition
- Author: Cornelia Otis Skinner; Emily Kimbrough
- Publisher: Dodd, Mead & Co.
- Publication date: 1942
- Pages: 247 pp.
- OCLC: 287927

Our Hearts Were Young and Gay is a book by actress Cornelia Otis Skinner and journalist Emily Kimbrough, published in 1942. The book presents a description of their European tour in the 1920s, when they were fresh out of college from Bryn Mawr. Skinner wrote of Kimbrough, "To know Emily is to enhance one's days with gaiety, charm and occasional terror". The book was popular with readers, spending five weeks atop the New York Times Non-Fiction Best Seller list in the winter of 1943.

The book was made into a motion picture in 1944, and in 1946 it was dramatized as a 3-act comedy play by Jean Kerr. In 1950 the book served as the basis for a CBS television comedy series. The series was initially titled Young and Gay, but after two weeks it was retitled The Girls. In 1960 a 2-act musical comedy version of the book was created.

During the Second World War, Hugh Trevor-Roper discovered that this book was used as a codebook by German intelligence.

In the movie "Sands of Iwo Jima" (1949), the book was in the pocket of a young soldier (played by Martin Milner) who was shot and killed on the beach.
