= Emily Kimbrough =

American novelist

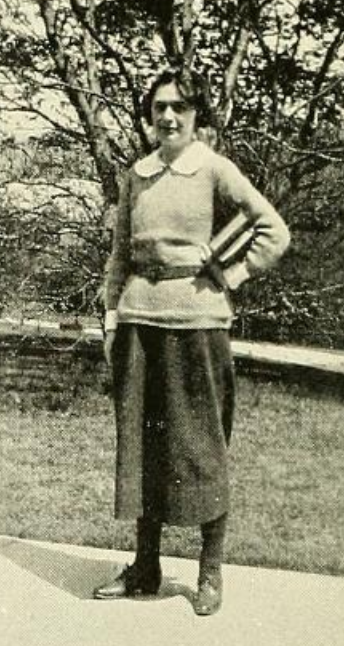
- Emily Kimbrough, from the 1921 yearbook of Bryn Mawr College
- Born: 23 October 1899; Muncie, Indiana
- Died: 10 February 1989 (aged 89); New York City
- Occupation: Writer

Emily Kimbrough (October 23, 1899 – February 10, 1989) was an American author and journalist.

== Biography ==
Emily Kimbrough was born in Muncie, Indiana. In 1921, she graduated from Bryn Mawr College and went on a trip to Europe with her friend Cornelia Otis Skinner. The two friends co-authored the memoir Our Hearts Were Young and Gay based on their European adventures. The success of the book as a New York Times best seller led to Kimbrough and Skinner going to Hollywood to work on a script for the movie version. Kimbrough wrote about the experience in We Followed Our Hearts to Hollywood.

Kimbrough's journalistic career included an editor post at Fashions of the Hour, a publication of Marshall Fields & Co., as well as managing editor at the Ladies Home Journal in 1926. She wrote a host of articles in Country Life, House & Garden, Travel, Reader's Digest, Saturday Review of Literature, and Parents magazines.

Kimbrough's Through Charley's Door (published 1952) is an autobiographical narrative of her experiences in Marshall Field's Advertising Bureau. Hired in November 1923 as the researcher and writer for the department store's quarterly catalog, Fashions of the Hour, Kimbrough was later promoted to editor of the publication. In 1926, she was recruited by Barton Curry with Ladies' Home Journal, and left Marshall Field's to become Ladies' Home Journal's fashion editor, a position she held until 1929. Between 1929 and 1952, Kimbrough was a freelance writer, with articles published in The New Yorker and Atlantic Monthly among others.

Much of her writing reflected her childhood in Muncie where she "was not a stranger to anyone". In 1976 the city of Muncie honored Emily Kimbrough by naming the neighborhood where she grew up after her. In 1978 it became part of the larger East Central Neighborhood District and listed on the National Register of Historic Places.

In 1952, she joined WCBS Radio. She died February 10, 1989, at her home in Manhattan.

== Bibliography ==
- Our Hearts Were Young and Gay (with Cornelia Otis Skinner, 1942)
- We Followed Our Hearts to Hollywood (1943)
- How Dear to My Heart (1944)
- ...It Gives Me Great Pleasure (1948)
- The Innocents from Indiana (1950)
- Through Charley's Door (1952)
- Forty Plus and Fancy Free (1954)
- So Near and Yet So Far (1955)
- Water, Water, Everywhere (1956)
- And a Right Good Crew (1958)
- Pleasure by the Busload (1961)
- Forever Old, Forever New (1964)
- Floating Island (1968), a description of a two-week voyage in France from Samoisa to Montbard via rivers and canals, using a converted barge called the Palinurus
- Now and Then (1972)
- Time Enough (1974)
- Better than Oceans (1976)

== Books adapted for television ==
In 1950 The Girls, a short-lived television series based on her Our Hearts Were Young and Gay novel was telecast, with Mary Malone playing Kimbrough. In 1957 The Eve Arden Show, a television series based on Kimbrough's book It Gives Me Great Pleasure, aired for one season.

== Personal life ==
In the book Floating Island, Kimbrough mentions that she had kept her "unmarried name professionally" and that she had daughters and grandchildren. In a piece for the New Yorker called “It’s the Hospitality”, she mentions that she has twin daughters.
