= Hopalong Cassidy (film series) =

From 1935 to 1948, 66 American Western films were produced featuring the character Hopalong Cassidy, played in all the films by actor William Boyd. The films were at the time collectively known as "Hoppies". In the films, Hopalong, or "Hoppy", and his white horse, Topper, travel through the Old West while dispensing justice, usually with two companions: one young and trouble-prone with a weakness for damsels in distress, the other older, comically awkward and outspoken.

The juvenile lead was successively played by James Ellison, Russell Hayden, Jay Kirby, George Reeves, Rand Brooks, and Jimmy Rogers. George Hayes (later to become known as "Gabby" Hayes) originally played Cassidy's grizzled sidekick, Windy Halliday. After Hayes left the series because of a salary dispute with producer Harry Sherman, he was replaced by the comedian Britt Wood as Speedy McGinnis and finally by the veteran film comedian Andy Clyde as California Carlson. Clyde, the most durable of the sidekicks, remained with the series until it ended. A few actors of future prominence appeared in Cassidy films, notably Robert Mitchum, who appeared in seven films at the beginning of his career.

== List of films ==
=== Produced by Harry Sherman for Paramount Pictures ===
- Hop-Along Cassidy (1935) (reissued as "Hopalong Cassidy Enters")
- The Eagle's Brood (1935)
- Bar 20 Rides Again (1935)
- Call of the Prairie (1936)
- Three on the Trail (1936)
- Heart of the West (1936)
- Hopalong Cassidy Returns (1936)
- Trail Dust (1936)
- Borderland (1937)
- Hills of Old Wyoming (1937)
- North of the Rio Grande (1937)
- Rustlers' Valley (1937)
- Hopalong Rides Again (1937)
- Texas Trail (1937)
- Partners of the Plains (1938)
- Cassidy of Bar 20 (1938)
- Heart of Arizona (1938)
- Bar 20 Justice (1938)
- Pride of the West (1938)
- In Old Mexico (1938)
- The Frontiersmen (1938) (sometimes mistakenly listed as "The Frontiersman")
- Sunset Trail (1939)
- Silver on the Sage (1939)
- Renegade Trail (1939)
- Range War (1939)
- Law of the Pampas (1939)
- Santa Fe Marshal (1940)
- The Showdown (1940)
- Hidden Gold (1940)
- Stagecoach War (1940)
- Three Men from Texas (1940)
- Doomed Caravan (1941)
- In Old Colorado (1941)
- Border Vigilantes (1941)
- Pirates on Horseback (1941)
- Wide Open Town (1941)
- Riders of the Timberline (1941)
- Stick to Your Guns (1941)
- Twilight on the Trail (1941)
- Outlaws of the Desert (1941)
- Secrets of the Wasteland (1941)

=== Produced by Harry Sherman for United Artists ===
- Lost Canyon (1942)
- Undercover Man (1942)
- Hoppy Serves a Writ (1943)
- Border Patrol (1943)
- Leather Burners (1943)
- Colt Comrades (1943)
- Bar 20 (1943)
- False Colors (1943)
- Riders of the Deadline (1943)
- Texas Masquerade (1944)
- Lumberjack (1944)
- Mystery Man (1944)
- Forty Thieves (1944)

=== Produced by William Boyd for United Artists ===
- The Devil's Playground (1946)
- Fool's Gold (1947)
- Unexpected Guest (1947)
- Dangerous Venture (1947)
- The Marauders (1947)
- Hoppy's Holiday (1947)
- Silent Conflict (1948)
- The Dead Don't Dream (1948)
- Sinister Journey (1948)
- Borrowed Trouble (1948)
- False Paradise (1948)
- Strange Gamble (1948)

== Home media ==
After Boyd's death, his company devoted to Hopalong Cassidy, U.S. Television Office, known until 1984 as William Boyd Productions, retained control of Cassidy films but, by the mid-1960s, had withdrawn them from television and sales in home movie markets. This remained the situation until the mid-1990s, after many Cassidy fans had died, when the company made available to The Western Channel a package series of restored and cleaned negative-based prints of the films to cable TV. These remained available on that channel until 2000, when they were again withdrawn.

On June 16, 2009, Echo Bridge Home Entertainment released the Hopalong Cassidy Ultimate Collector's Edition, which included all 66 theatrical films on 14 DVDs, packed into a facsimile Hopalong Cassidy tin lunchbox.

As of the present, FilmRise distributes the Cassidy films for YouTube under license from U.S. Television Office, which remains the copyright holder for the franchise.
