= The Marauders (1947 film) =

1947 film by George Archainbaud

The Marauders (King of the Range)
- Directed by: George Archainbaud
- Screenplay by: Charles Belden
- Produced by: Lewis J. Rachmil
- Starring: William Boyd; Andy Clyde; Rand Brooks; Ian Wolfe; Dorinda Clifton; Mary Newton
- Cinematography: Mack Stengler
- Edited by: Fred W. Berger
- Music by: David Chudnow
- Production company: Hopalong Cassidy Productions
- Distributed by: United Artists
- Release date: July 1, 1947
- Running time: 63 minutes
- Country: United States
- Language: English

The Marauders (later retitled King of the Range) is a 1947 American Western film directed by George Archainbaud and written by Charles Belden. The film stars William Boyd, Andy Clyde, Rand Brooks, Ian Wolfe, Dorinda Clifton and Mary Newton. It was released on July 1, 1947 by United Artists.

== Plot ==
Hoping to aid the few remaining residents, Hoppy, California and Lucky investigate a ghost town that has been purchased dirt cheap by an unknown woman.

== Cast ==
- William Boyd as Hopalong Cassidy
- Andy Clyde as California Carlson
- Rand Brooks as Lucky Jenkins
- Ian Wolfe as Deacon Black
- Dorinda Clifton as Susan Crowell
- Mary Newton as Mrs. Crowell
- Harry Cording as Riker
- Earle Hodgins as Clerk Tom
- Richard Bailey as Oil Drille
