= Borrowed Trouble =

1948 film by George Archainbaud

- Theatrical release poster
- Directed by: George Archainbaud
- Screenplay by: Charles Belden
- Produced by: Lewis J. Rachmil
- Starring: William Boyd; Andy Clyde; Rand Brooks; Helen Chapman; Anne O'Neal; John Parrish; Cliff Clark
- Cinematography: Mack Stengler
- Edited by: Fred W. Berger
- Music by: Darrell Calker
- Production company: Hopalong Cassidy Productions
- Distributed by: United Artists
- Release date: July 23, 1948
- Running time: 58 minutes
- Country: United States
- Language: English

Borrowed Trouble is a 1948 American Western film directed by George Archainbaud and written by Charles Belden. The film stars William Boyd, Andy Clyde, Rand Brooks, Helen Chapman, Anne O'Neal, John Parrish and Cliff Clark. The film was released on July 23, 1948, by United Artists.

== Cast ==
- William Boyd as Hopalong Cassidy
- Andy Clyde as California Carlson
- Rand Brooks as Lucky Jenkins
- Helen Chapman as Lola Blair
- Anne O'Neal as Miss Abott
- John Parrish as Steve Mawson
- Cliff Clark as Dink Davis
- Earle Hodgins as Sheriff
- Herbert Rawlinson as Groves
- Don Haggerty as Lippy
- James Harrison as Rocky
- Clarke Stevens as Henchman
- George Sowards as Henchman
- Eilene Janssen as School Girl
- Nancy Stowe as School Girl
- Jimmy Crane as Dinky Davis
- Bill O'Leary as School Boy
- Norman Ollestad as School Boy
