= The Dead Don't Dream =

1948 film by George Archainbaud

- Theatrical release poster
- Directed by: George Archainbaud
- Screenplay by: Francis Rosenwald
- Produced by: Lewis J. Rachmil
- Starring: William Boyd; Andy Clyde; Rand Brooks; Mary Ware; John Parrish; Leonard Penn
- Cinematography: Mack Stengler
- Edited by: Fred W. Berger
- Music by: Darrell Calker
- Production company: Hopalong Cassidy Productions
- Distributed by: United Artists
- Release date: April 30, 1948
- Running time: 62 minutes
- Country: United States
- Language: English

The Dead Don't Dream is a 1948 American Western film directed by George Archainbaud and written by Francis Rosenwald. The picture stars William Boyd, Andy Clyde, Rand Brooks, Mary Ware, John Parrish and Leonard Penn, and was released in 1948 by United Artists.

== Plot ==
Hopalong Cassidy investigates how and why three men died in a hotel room.

== Cast ==
- William Boyd as Hopalong Cassidy
- Andy Clyde as California Carlson
- Rand Brooks as Lucky Jenkins
- Mary Ware as Mary Benton
- John Parrish as Jeff Potter
- Leonard Penn as Earl Wesson
- Francis McDonald as Bart Lansing
- Richard Alexander as Duke
- Bob Gabriel as Larry Potter
- Stanley Andrews as Jesse Williams
- Forbes Murray as Sheriff Tompson
- Don Haggerty as Deputy Sheriff
