= Fool's Gold (1947 film) =

American Western film by George Archainbaud

- Theatrical release poster
- Directed by: George Archainbaud
- Screenplay by: Doris Schroeder
- Produced by: Lewis J. Rachmil
- Starring: William Boyd; Andy Clyde; Rand Brooks; Robert Emmett Keane; Jane Randolph
- Cinematography: Mack Stengler
- Edited by: Fred W. Berger
- Music by: David Chudnow
- Production company: Hopalong Cassidy Productions
- Distributed by: United Artists
- Release date: January 31, 1947
- Running time: 63 minutes
- Country: United States
- Language: English

Fool's Gold is a 1947 American Western film, directed by George Archainbaud and written by Doris Schroeder. The film stars: William Boyd, Andy Clyde, Rand Brooks, Robert Emmett Keane and Jane Randolph. The film was released on January 31, 1947, by United Artists. This is the 56th film of the 66 in the series and the first one produced by William Boyd Productions, instead of Harry Sherman.

== Plot ==
Hoppy infiltrates a band of outlaws to save his Army buddy's son, who has fallen in with the wrong crowd.

== Cast ==
- William Boyd as Hopalong Cassidy
- Andy Clyde as California Carlson
- Rand Brooks as Lucky Jenkins
- Robert Emmett Keane as Professor Dixon
- Jane Randolph as Jessie Dixon
- Steve Barclay as Bruce Landy
- Harry Cording as Henchman Duke
- Earle Hodgins as Sandler
- Robert Bentley as Henchman Barton
- Wee Willie Davis as Blackie
- Forbes Murray as Colonel Jed Landy
- Glen B. Gallagher as Lieutenant Anderson
- Ben Corbett as Sergeant
- Fred Toones as Bar 20 Handy Man

== Reception ==
Variety wrote that it was "sturdy action fair for the outdoor fans" and that it was "good entertainment in its field."
