= Hoppy's Holiday =

1947 film by George Archainbaud

- Theatrical release poster
- Directed by: George Archainbaud
- Screenplay by: J. Benton Cheney; Bennett Cohen; Ande Lamb
- Story by: Ellen Corby; Cecile Kramer
- Produced by: Lewis J. Rachmil
- Starring: William Boyd; Andy Clyde; Rand Brooks; Mary Ware; Andrew Tombes; Leonard Penn
- Cinematography: Mack Stengler
- Edited by: Fred W. Berger
- Music by: David Chudnow
- Production company: Hopalong Cassidy Productions
- Distributed by: United Artists
- Release date: July 18, 1947
- Running time: 60 minutes
- Country: United States
- Language: English

Hoppy's Holiday is a 1947 American Western film directed by George Archainbaud and written by J. Benton Cheney, Bennett Cohen and Ande Lamb. The film stars William Boyd, Andy Clyde, Rand Brooks, Mary Ware, Andrew Tombes and Leonard Penn. The film was released on July 18, 1947, by United Artists.

== Cast ==
- William Boyd as Hopalong Cassidy
- Andy Clyde as California Carlson
- Rand Brooks as Lucky Jenkins
- Mary Ware as Gloria Patton
- Andrew Tombes as Mayor Frank Patton
- Leonard Penn as Dunning
- Jeff Corey as Jed
- Donald Kirke as Sheriff
- Mike Ragan as Henchman Ace
- Gil Patric as Henchman Hill
- Frank Henry as Henchman Bart
