= Silent Conflict =

1948 film by George Archainbaud

- Directed by: George Archainbaud
- Screenplay by: Charles Belden
- Produced by: Lewis J. Rachmil
- Starring: William Boyd; Andy Clyde; Rand Brooks; Virginia Belmont; Earle Hodgins; James Harrison
- Cinematography: Mack Stengler
- Edited by: Fred W. Berger
- Music by: Darrell Calker
- Production company: Hopalong Cassidy Productions
- Distributed by: United Artists
- Release date: March 19, 1948
- Running time: 61 minutes
- Country: United States
- Language: English

Silent Conflict is a 1948 American Western film directed by George Archainbaud and written by Charles Belden. The film stars William Boyd, Andy Clyde, Rand Brooks, Virginia Belmont, Earle Hodgins and James Harrison. It was released on March 19, 1948, by United Artists.

== Cast ==
- William Boyd as Hopalong Cassidy
- Andy Clyde as California Carlson
- Rand Brooks as Lucky Jenkins
- Virginia Belmont as Rene Richards
- Earle Hodgins as Doc Richards
- James Harrison as Speed Blaney
- Forbes Murray as Rancher Randall
- John Butler as Inn Clerk Jeb
- Herbert Rawlinson as Yardman Jake
- Richard Alexander as Rancher
- Don Haggerty as Rancher
