= The Devil's Playground (1946 film) =

1946 film by George Archainbaud

- Theatrical release poster
- Directed by: George Archainbaud
- Screenplay by: Ted Wilson
- Produced by: Lewis J. Rachmil
- Starring: William Boyd; Andy Clyde; Rand Brooks; Elaine Riley; Robert Elliott
- Cinematography: Mack Stengler
- Edited by: Fred W. Berger
- Music by: David Chudnow
- Production company: Hopalong Cassidy Productions
- Distributed by: United Artists
- Release date: November 15, 1946
- Running time: 65 minutes
- Country: United States
- Language: English

The Devil's Playground is a 1946 American Western film directed by George Archainbaud and written by Ted Wilson. The film stars William Boyd, Andy Clyde, Rand Brooks, Elaine Riley and Robert Elliott. The film was released on November 15, 1946, by United Artists.

== Plot ==
Hoppy finds a wounded girl and later finds Judge Morton who claims the girl is his daughter and he is looking for her. But Hoppy soon learns the girl is looking for stolen gold she wants to return and the Judge in not her father but only wants the gold. Hoppy and the girl find the gold but the Judge and his men find Hoppy and the boys and trap them in a cabin.

== Cast ==
- William Boyd as Hopalong Cassidy
- Andy Clyde as California Carlson
- Rand Brooks as Lucky Jenkins
- Elaine Riley as Mrs. Evans
- Robert Elliott as Judge Morton
- Joseph J. Greene as Sheriff Porky
- Francis McDonald as Henchman Roberts
- Nedrick Young as Curly Evans
- Earle Hodgins as Deputy Daniel
- George Eldredge as U.S. Marshal
- Everett Shields as Henchman Wolfe
- John George as Shorty
