= The Steel Fist =

Film directed by Wesley Barry

- Theatrical release poster
- Directed by: Wesley Barry
- Screenplay by: C.K. Kivari
- Story by: Phyllis Parker
- Produced by: Wesley Barry
- Starring: Roddy McDowall; Kristine Miller; Harry Lauter; Rand Brooks; Byron Foulger; Kate Drain Lawson
- Cinematography: William A. Sickner
- Edited by: Ace Herman
- Music by: Edward J. Kay
- Production company: William F. Broidy Pictures Corp.
- Distributed by: Monogram Pictures
- Release date: January 6, 1952
- Running time: 73 minutes
- Country: United States
- Language: English

The Steel Fist is a 1952 American drama film directed by Wesley Barry and written by C.K. Kivari. The film stars Roddy McDowall, Kristine Miller, Harry Lauter, Rand Brooks, Byron Foulger and Kate Drain Lawson. The film was released on January 6, 1952, by Monogram Pictures.

== Plot ==
An idealistic Soviet student goes on the run from the communist authorities with the help of the underground movement.

== Cast ==
- Roddy McDowall as Eric Kardin
- Kristine Miller as Marlina
- Harry Lauter as Franz
- Rand Brooks as Capt. Giorg Nicholoff
- Byron Foulger as Prof. Kardin
- Kate Drain Lawson as Mrs. Krechow
- Bob Peoples as First Lieutenant
- Gil Perkins as First organizer
- Fred Krone as First Student
- Murray Alper as Nicholas
