= Renegade Trail =

1939 film

- Theatrical release poster
- Directed by: Lesley Selander
- Screenplay by: John Rathmell; Harrison Jacobs
- Produced by: Harry Sherman
- Starring: William Boyd; George "Gabby" Hayes; Russell Hayden; Charlotte Wynters; Russell Hopton; Roy Barcroft; John Merton
- Cinematography: Russell Harlan
- Edited by: Sherman A. Rose
- Music by: Gerard Carbonara; John Leipold
- Production company: Harry Sherman Productions
- Distributed by: Paramount Pictures
- Release date: August 18, 1939
- Running time: 58 minutes
- Country: United States
- Language: English

Renegade Trail is a 1939 American Western film directed by Lesley Selander and written by John Rathmell and Harrison Jacobs. The film stars William Boyd, George "Gabby" Hayes, Russell Hayden, Charlotte Wynters, Russell Hopton, Roy Barcroft and John Merton. The film was released on August 18, 1939, by Paramount Pictures.

== Cast ==
- William Boyd as Hopalong Cassidy
- George "Gabby" Hayes as Windy Halliday
- Russell Hayden as Lucky Jenkins
- Charlotte Wynters as Mary Joyce
- Russell Hopton as Bob Smoky Joslin
- Roy Barcroft as Stiff-Hat Bailey
- John Merton as Henchman Tex Traynor
- Sonny Bupp as Joey Joyce
- Eddie Dean as Singing Cowhand Red
- The King's Men as Singing Cowhands
