= Mystery Man (film) =

1944 film by George Archainbaud

- Theatrical release poster
- Directed by: George Archainbaud
- Screenplay by: J. Benton Cheney
- Produced by: Harry Sherman
- Starring: William Boyd; Andy Clyde; Jimmy Rogers; Don Costello; Eleanor Stewart; Francis McDonald
- Cinematography: Russell Harlan
- Edited by: Carroll Lewis
- Production company: Harry Sherman Productions
- Distributed by: United Artists
- Release date: May 31, 1944
- Running time: 58 minutes
- Country: United States
- Language: English

Mystery Man is a 1944 American Western film directed by George Archainbaud and written by J. Benton Cheney. The film stars William Boyd, Andy Clyde, Jimmy Rogers, Don Costello, Eleanor Stewart and Francis McDonald. The film was released on May 31, 1944, by United Artists.

== Plot ==
Hoppy, California & Jimmy Rogers set out to stop a gang of bank robbers led by a man pretending to be respectable citizen.

== Cast ==
- William Boyd as Hopalong Cassidy
- Andy Clyde as California Carlson
- Jimmy Rogers as Jimmy Rogers
- Don Costello as Bud Trilling
- Eleanor Stewart as Diane Newhall
- Francis McDonald as Henchman Bert Rogan
- Forrest Taylor as Sheriff Sam Newhall
- Jack Rockwell as Marshal Ted Blane
- John Merton as Henchman Bill
- Pierce Lyden as Henchman Red
- Bob Burns as Rancher Tom Hanlon
- Ozie Waters as Tex
