= Rand Brooks =

American actor (1918–2003)

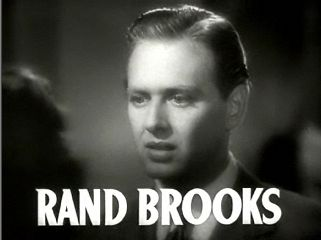
- Brooks in the trailer for Dramatic School, 1938
- Born: September 21, 1918; Wright City, Missouri, U.S.
- Died: September 1, 2003 (aged 84); Santa Ynez, California, U.S.
- Occupations: Actor; producer; rancher
- Spouses: Lois Laurel (m. 1949; div. 1978) Hermine Brooks (m. 1978)
- Children: 2

Arlington Rand Brooks Jr. (September 21, 1918 – September 1, 2003) was an American film and television actor, probably best known for playing Charles Hamilton in Gone With the Wind (1939).

== Early life ==
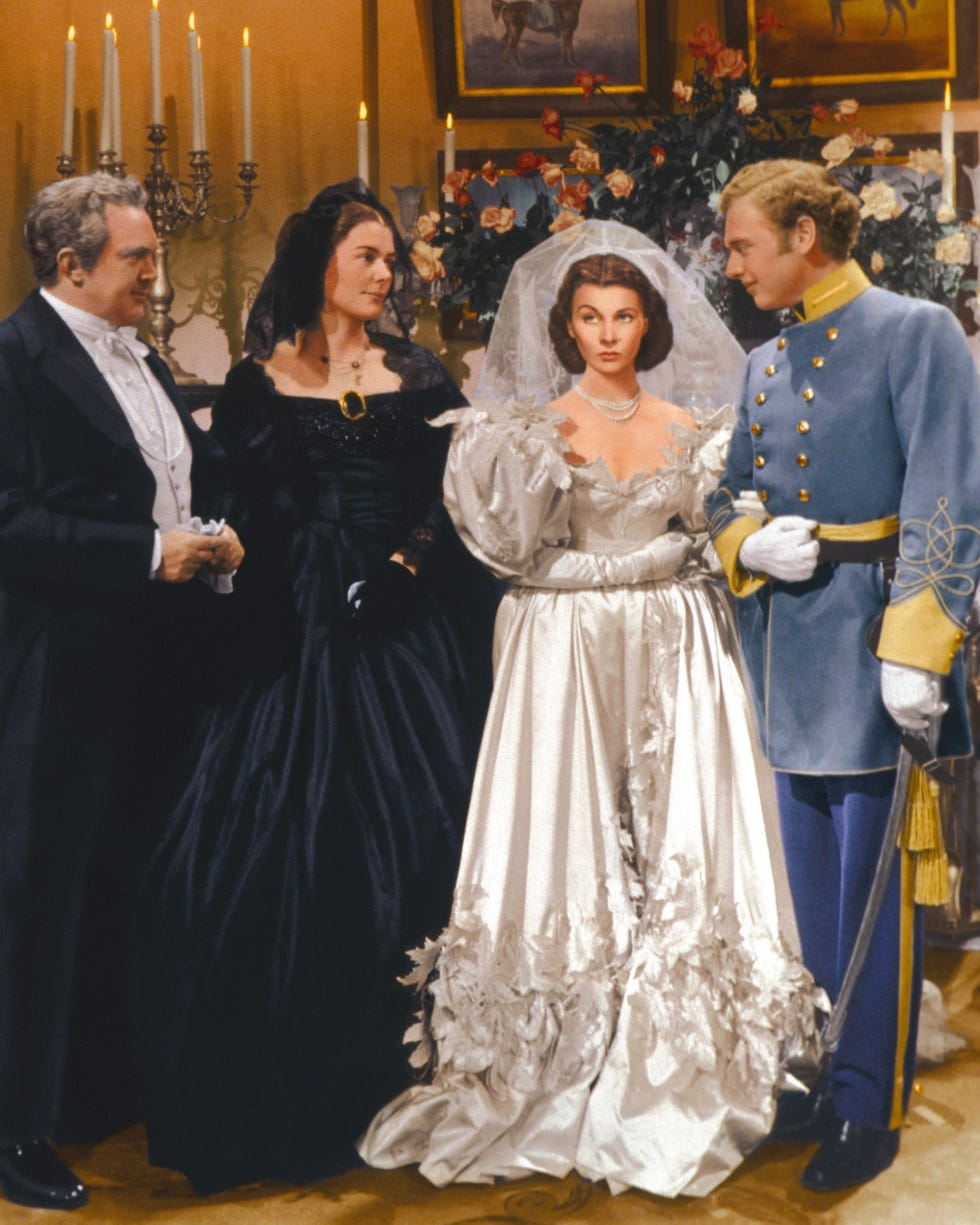
Thomas Mitchell, Barbara O'Neil, Vivien Leigh and Rand Brooks in Gone with the Wind (1939)

Brooks was born in Wright City, Missouri. The son of Arlington Rand Brooks, a farmer. (Note: Though his obituary in the Guardian mentions a traveling salesman father and birth in St. Louis, earlier newspaper reports in the Warrenton Bulletin state he was the son of a local farmer and left the area as a child; the 1920 census has him living in Wright City, Missouri.) His mother and he moved to Los Angeles when he was four, though he continued to spend summers in Wright City. Brooks continued to make visits to his hometown of Wright City into the 1950s, up to and following the death of his father in 1950. His mother and grandfather also were actors.

== Career ==
=== Early career ===
After leaving school, he was given a screen test at Metro-Goldwyn-Mayer and received a bit part in Love Finds Andy Hardy (1938). His big break came when he was cast as Charles Hamilton in Gone with the Wind (1939), a part which he later admitted he despised; wanting to play more masculine roles. He was earning $100 per week under contract at MGM. But when he was on loan to Selznick International Pictures for Gone with the Wind, he was paid $500 per week.

After Gone With the Wind, he had relatively small parts in other movies including Babes in Arms, then a regular role as Lucky in the Hopalong Cassidy series of Westerns in the mid-1940s; Brooks succeeded Russell Hayden in the role. Among the films starring William Boyd as Hopalong, were Hoppy's Holiday, The Dead Don't Dream, and Borrowed Trouble. He received positive notice for his work in Fool's Gold, with Variety reporting that he did "an excellent job." In edited, half-hour versions of some of the films, he appeared in 12 of the 52 episodes of the Hopalong Cassidy television series.

=== Military service ===
Brooks served in the United States Army Air Corps during World War II, eventually reaching the rank of sergeant. He trained at Buckley Field in Colorado, in March 1943 and was stationed in Springfield, Missouri, as of May 1943. He was for a time at San Antonio Air Field. Then trained for flying, but did some theatre work under General Henry H. Arnold. He was ill for a time during his service and in 1944 worked in recruitment in Louisiana.

=== Post-military film and television work ===
In 1948, he co-starred with Adele Jergens and Marilyn Monroe in the low-budget, black-and-white Columbia Pictures film, Ladies of the Chorus. Becoming the first actor to share an on-screen kiss with Monroe, who in a few years was one of the world's biggest movie stars. Filmed in just 10 days, the film was released soon after its completion.

Variety called his performance in the 1952 film The Steel Fist "capable."

Television brought new opportunities, again often in Westerns. He played Cpl. Randy Boone in the 1950s television series The Adventures of Rin Tin Tin.

He had guest roles in 1950s Western series, including Mackenzie's Raiders, The Lone Ranger, Maverick, Gunsmoke, and Bonanza. Appeared twice on the syndicated adventure series, Rescue 8, as well as on CBS's Perry Mason courtroom drama series.

In 1962, he directed and produced a movie about brave dogs, Bearheart, but the film was entangled in legal troubles due to his business manager's involvement in crimes such as forgery and graft. The film finally released in 1978, under the title Legend of the Northwest.

=== Post-entertainment career ===
After he left show business, Brooks owned and operated a private ambulance company, Professional Ambulance, in Glendale, California. He commented that he "died in more pictures than almost anyone" and that though he was never very big in show business, he was willing to return to it. He sold the ambulance company in 1994, and retired to his ranch in the Santa Ynez Valley, where he bred champion Andalusian horses.

He attended a Gone with the Wind reunion for Clark Gable's birthday, along with Ann Rutherford and Fred Crane, in Cadiz, Ohio, in 1992.

== Personal life ==
Variety reported that Brooks married Clover Barrick on April 18, 1945. Married Lois Laurel (d. 2017), daughter of Stan Laurel, in 1949. Their son, Arlington Rand Brooks III, was born in September 1949. Their daughter Laurel was born in August 1950 in Santa Monica, California. He married Hermine Brooks in 1978.

== Death ==
Brooks died in Santa Ynez, California on September 1, 2003, aged 84.

== Partial filmography ==
- Hold That Kiss (1938) – Guitar Player in Band (uncredited)
- Love Finds Andy Hardy (1938) – Young Man on Bandstand (uncredited)
- Dramatic School (1938) – Pasquel Jr.
- The Old Maid (1939) – Jim
- Babes in Arms (1939) – Jeff Steele
- Thunder Afloat (1939) – Listener (uncredited)
- Dancing Co-Ed (1939) – Steve (uncredited)
- Balalaika (1939) – Crying Soldier (uncredited)
- Gone with the Wind (1939) – Charles Hamilton
- Laddie (1940) – Peter Dover
- Northwest Passage (1940) – Peter Dover
- And One Was Beautiful (1940) – Joe Havens
- Florian (1940) – Victor
- Girl from Avenue A (1940) – Steve
- Life with Henry (1940) – Daniel Gordon (uncredited)
- The Son of Monte Cristo (1940) – Hans Mirbach
- Jennie (1940) – Karl Schermer
- Cheers for Miss Bishop (1941) – 'Buzz' Wheelwright
- Double Date (1941) – Jerry Baldwin
- The People vs. Dr. Kildare (1941) – Dr. George Young (uncredited)
- Lady Scarface (1941) – James 'Jimmy' Powell
- Niagara Falls (1941) – Honeymooner
- Cowboy Serenade (1942) – Jim Agnew
- The Affairs of Jimmy Valentine (1942)
- Fingers at the Window (1942) – Young Reporter (uncredited)
- The Sombrero Kid (1942) – Philip Martin
- Air Force (1943) – Co-Pilot (uncredited)
- High Explosive (1943) – Jimmy Baker
- Lady in the Dark (1944) – Ben (uncredited)
- Resisting Enemy Interrogation (1944) – Pilot (uncredited)
- The Harvey Girls (1946) – Townsman at Saloon (uncredited)
- The Devil's Playground (1946) – Lucky Jenkins
- The Great Morgan (1946) – Film Character (uncredited)
- Fool's Gold (1946) – Lucky Jenkins
- Unexpected Guest (1947) – Lucky Jenkins
- Dangerous Venture (1947) – Lucky Jenkins
- The Marauders (1947) – Lucky Jenkins
- Hoppy's Holiday (1947) – Lucky Jenkins
- Kilroy Was Here (1947) – Rodney Meadows
- Silent Conflict (1948) – Lucky Jenkins
- The Dead Don't Dream (1948) – Lucky Jenkins
- Sinister Journey (1948) – Lucky Jenkins
- Borrowed Trouble (1948) – Lucky Jenkins
- False Paradise (1948) – Lucky Jenkins
- Strange Gamble (1948) – Lucky Jenkins
- Sundown in Santa Fe (1948) – Tom Wyatt
- Joan of Arc (1948) – Jean d'Arc
- Ladies of the Chorus (1948) – Randy Carroll
- The Wyoming Bandit (1949) – Jimmy Howard
- Black Midnight (1949) – Daniel Jordan
- The Vanishing Westerner (1950) – Sanderson's First Victim
- Riding High (1950) – Henry Early
- Bunco Squad (1950) – Robert (uncredited)
- Heart of the Rockies (1951) – Jim Corley
- Yukon Manhunt (1951) – Len Kaufman
- The Steel Fist (1952) – Capt. Giorg Nicholoff
- The Cimarron Kid (1952) – Emmett Dalton (uncredited)
- Waco (1952) – Henchman Al
- Man from the Black Hills (1952) – Fake Jimmy Fallon
- The Gunman (1952) – Jud Calvert
- Montana Incident (1952) – Dave Connors
- The Maverick (1952) – Trooper Barnham
- Born to the Saddle (1953) – John Grant
- The Charge at Feather River (1953) – Pvt. Adams (uncredited)
- To Hell and Back (1955) – Lt. Harris (uncredited)
- Official Detective (1957, TV Series) – McClellan
- The Challenge of Rin Tin Tin (1958)
- The Last Hurrah (1958) – Votes Tallyman (uncredited)
- Stump Run (1959) – Wayne Lawson
- Comanche Station (1960) – Station Man
- Posse from Hell (1961) – Townsman (uncredited)
- Stagecoach to Dancers' Rock (1962) – Quint Rucker
- The Munsters (Nov 1964) – (Tin-Can man)
- Harlow (1965) – Casting Director (uncredited)
- Requiem for a Gunfighter (1965) – Abe Gentry
- Combat! (1965, TV Series) – G.I. Lieutenant
- Leather Narcissus (1967)
- In Like Flint (1967) – Missile Control Officer (uncredited)
- Double Indemnity (1973, TV Movie) – Conductor (uncredited)
- The Sex Symbol (1974, TV Movie) – Edward Kelly (final film role)
