= Doomed Caravan =

1941 film by Lesley Selander

- Directed by: Lesley Selander
- Screenplay by: J. Benton Cheney; Johnston McCulley
- Story by: Clarence E. Mulford
- Produced by: Harry Sherman; Joseph W. Engel
- Starring: William Boyd; Andy Clyde; Minna Gombell
- Cinematography: Russell Harlan
- Edited by: Carroll Lewis; Sherman A. Rose
- Music by: John Leipold
- Production company: Harry Sherman Productions
- Distributed by: Paramount Pictures
- Release date: January 10, 1941
- Running time: 62 minutes
- Country: United States
- Language: English

Doomed Caravan is a 1941 American Western film directed by Lesley Selander and starring William Boyd, Andy Clyde and Minna Gombell. The film is a Western and part of the Hopalong Cassidy series released by Paramount Pictures. It is the 32nd entry in a series of 66 films.

== Plot ==
Stephen Westcott and Ed Martin scheme to put Jane Travers' wagon line out of business. They want to use it take over all the wagon- train traffic going west. Hoppy, California and Lucky must make sure that doesn't happen. Jane Travers asks Hoppy to help protect her next caravan against robbers. Westcott and Martin are out to stop them and have their men dressed as soldiers to escort the caravan. The fake soldiers don't fool Hoppy and he and the Bar 20 boys foil that plan. Martin's men then capture everyone but Hoppy and send them off to the firing squad. Now Hoppy has to find a way to save them singlehandedly.

== Cast ==
- William Boyd as Hopalong Cassidy
- Andy Clyde as California Carlson
- Russell Hayden as Lucky Jenkins
- Minna Gombell as Jane Travers
- Morris Ankrum as Stephen Westcott
- Georgia Ellis as Diana Westcott
- Trevor Bardette as Ed Martin
- Pat J. O'Brien as Henchman Jim Ferber
- Ray Bennett as Henchman Pete Gregg
- José Luis Tortosa as Governor Don Pedro

== Reception ==
Doomed Caravan has 3 out of 5 stars on AllMovie.
