= Hendrysburg, Ohio =

Unincorporated community in Ohio, U.S.

Coordinates: 40°03′39″N 81°10′23″W

Hendrysburg is an unincorporated community in Belmont County, in the U.S. state of Ohio.

== History ==
Hendrysburg was laid out in 1828 by Charles Hendry, and named for him. A post office called Hendrysburgh was established in 1830, the name was changed to Hendrysburg in 1893, and the post office closed in 1983.

== Notable people ==
- William Boyd (actor) – actor in American Western films.
