= Pirates on Horseback =

1941 film by Lesley Selander

- Theatrical release poster
- Directed by: Lesley Selander
- Screenplay by: Ethel La Blanche; J. Benton Cheney
- Produced by: Harry Sherman
- Starring: William Boyd; Russell Hayden; Andy Clyde; Eleanor Stewart; Morris Ankrum; William Haade
- Cinematography: Russell Harlan
- Edited by: Carroll Lewis; Sherman A. Rose
- Music by: John Leipold
- Production company: Harry Sherman Productions
- Distributed by: Paramount Pictures
- Release date: May 23, 1941
- Running time: 69 minutes
- Country: United States
- Language: English

Pirates on Horseback is a 1941 American Western film directed by Lesley Selander and written by Ethel La Blanche and J. Benton Cheney. The film stars William Boyd, Russell Hayden, Andy Clyde, Eleanor Stewart, Morris Ankrum and William Haade. The film was released on May 23, 1941, by Paramount Pictures.

== Plot ==
Hoppy and the boys are out to take back Trudy Pendleton's mine after it was taken from her. After they find the mine, Hoppy gets into a fight with gambler Ace Gibson.

== Cast ==
- William Boyd as Hopalong Cassidy
- Russell Hayden as Lucky Jenkins
- Andy Clyde as California Carlson
- Eleanor Stewart as Trudy Pendleton
- Morris Ankrum as Ace Gibson
- William Haade as Henchman Bill Watson
- Dennis Moore as Henchman Jud Carter
- Henry Hall as Sheriff John Blake
- Britt Wood as Ben Pendleton
