= Bar 20 Justice =

1938 film by Lesley Selander

- Theatrical release poster
- Directed by: Lesley Selander
- Screenplay by: Arnold Belgard; Harrison Jacobs
- Based on: Buck Peters, Ranchman; 1912 novel by Clarence E. Mulford; John Wood
- Produced by: Harry Sherman
- Starring: William Boyd; George "Gabby" Hayes; Russell Hayden; Gwen Gaze; William Duncan; Pat J. O'Brien
- Cinematography: Russell Harlan
- Edited by: Robert B. Warwick Jr.
- Production company: Paramount Pictures
- Distributed by: Paramount Pictures
- Release date: June 28, 1938
- Running time: 70 minutes
- Country: United States
- Language: English

Bar 20 Justice is a 1938 American Western film directed by Lesley Selander and written by Arnold Belgard and Harrison Jacobs. The film stars William Boyd, George "Gabby" Hayes, Russell Hayden, Gwen Gaze, William Duncan and Pat J. O'Brien. The film was released on June 28, 1938, by Paramount Pictures. This was the 16th entry in the "Hopalong Cassidy" western series.

Bar 20 Justice was directed by Lesley Selander, who would eventually helm 27 of the 66 "Cassidy" films.

== Plot ==
Ann Dennis' mine is being used by some criminals to steal ore, cowboy Hopalong Cassidy pursues the crooks through the mine shafts.

== Cast ==
- William Boyd as Hopalong Cassidy
- George "Gabby" Hayes as Windy Halliday
- Russell Hayden as Lucky Jenkins
- Gwen Gaze as Ann Dennis
- William Duncan as Buck Peters
- Pat J. O'Brien as Frazier
- Paul Sutton as Mine Foreman Slade
- John Beach as Denny Dennis
- Joe De Stefani as Assayer Perkins
- Walter Long as Duke Pierce
- Bruce Mitchell as Ross
