= Silver on the Sage =

1939 film by Lesley Selander

- Theatrical release poster
- Directed by: Lesley Selander
- Screenplay by: Maurice Geraghty
- Based on: Characters created by Clarence E. Mulford
- Produced by: Harry Sherman
- Starring: William Boyd; George "Gabby" Hayes; Russell Hayden; Ruth Rogers; Stanley Ridges; Frederick Burton; Jack Rockwell
- Cinematography: Russell Harlan
- Edited by: Robert B. Warwick Jr.
- Music by: John Leipold; Stephan Pasternacki
- Production company: Harry Sherman Productions
- Distributed by: Paramount Pictures
- Release date: March 31, 1939
- Running time: 68 minutes
- Country: United States
- Language: English

Silver on the Sage is a 1939 American Western film directed by Lesley Selander and written by Maurice Geraghty. Starring William Boyd, George "Gabby" Hayes, Russell Hayden, Ruth Rogers, Stanley Ridges, Frederick Burton and Jack Rockwell, it was released on March 31, 1939, by Paramount Pictures. Silver on the Sage was Hopalong Cassidy series entry number 25.

== Plot ==
Windy (George "Gabby" Hayes) makes the mistake of accusing the buyer, Lazy-J owner Tom Hamilton (Frederick Burton), of the theft, but Lucky (Russell Hayden) suspects the foreman Dave Talbot (Stanley Ridges). Hamilton is murdered, however, and Talbot has the perfect alibi: He was playing cards at the Mirage Bar where Hoppy (William Boyd) had gotten himself a job under the guise of being the noted gambler Bill Thompson. With Talbot not able to be in two places at the same time, the marshal (Jack Rockwell) has no choice but to arrest Lucky for murder.

== Cast ==
- William Boyd as Hopalong Cassidy
- George "Gabby" Hayes as Windy Halliday
- Russell Hayden as Lucky Jenkins
- Ruth Rogers as Barbara Hamilton
- Stanley Ridges as Earl Brennan / Dave Talbot
- Frederick Burton as Tom Hamilton
- Jack Rockwell as City Marshal
- Roy Barcroft as Henchman Ewing
- Ed Cassidy as Pierce
- Wen Wrightas Lane
