= You Were Never Uglier =

- Directed by: Jules White
- Screenplay by: Felix Adler
- Story by: Preston Black
- Based on: Gobs of Trouble (1935)
- Produced by: Jules White
- Starring: Andy Clyde, Emmett Lynn, and Esther Howard
- Cinematography: George Meehan
- Edited by: Charles Hochberg
- Production company: Columbia Pictures
- Release date: June 2, 1944
- Country: United States
- Language: English

You Were Never Uglier is a 1944 American comedy short subject motion picture directed and produced by Jules White and written by Felix Adler, starring Andy Clyde, Emmett Lynn, and Esther Howard. It was released to theaters by Columbia Pictures on June 2, 1944. The film is a remake of Columbia's 1935 comedy Gobs of Trouble, starring Monty Collins and Tom Kennedy. The title is a parody of Columbia's recent feature film You Were Never Lovelier.

You Were Never Uglier was remade in 1952 as Hooked and Rooked, with Margie Liszt and Maxine Gates playing the roles of the fiancées.

== Plot ==
Andy and Emmett are two sailors who finally return home to propose to their fiancées. Bashful Andy uses a disc recorder to rehearse his marriage proposal, which his fiancée Nan accepts. Emmett also marries, but soon the two hapless shipmates find out that married life is no piece of cake, as their formerly coy girlfriends suddenly become bossy wives.

Both husbands are accident-prone, and their apartment burns down. They find a small house in the suburbs and volunteer to clean the place up, while the wives go shopping for the day and leave stepson Junior in their care. Upstairs, Andy has trouble putting a bed together, while downstairs Emmett has trouble with a dresser. Emmett eventually brings the dresser upstairs via a movable cart; when he tries to flip it over, it ends up crashing and breaking.

Later, they paint the kitchen, but Junior accidentally dumps out fireplace soot and it soon covers the kitchen. The wives return, outraged. They both plan to clobber Andy and Emmett with boards, but the men duck and the women knock each other out. Andy and Emmett, fleeing for their lives, return to their berths on the ship.

== Cast ==
- Andy Clyde as Andy
- Emmett Lynn as Emmett
- Esther Howard as Nan
- Ida Mae Johnson as Myrtle
- Buz Buckley as Junior
- Judy Malcolm
