= Pride of the West =

1938 film by Lesley Selander

- Theatrical release poster
- Directed by: Lesley Selander
- Screenplay by: Nate Watt
- Produced by: Harry Sherman
- Starring: William Boyd; George "Gabby" Hayes; Russell Hayden; Earle Hodgins; Charlotte Field; Billy King
- Cinematography: Russell Harlan
- Edited by: Sherman A. Rose
- Production company: Paramount Pictures
- Distributed by: Paramount Pictures
- Release date: July 8, 1938
- Running time: 56 minutes
- Country: United States
- Language: English

Pride of the West is a 1938 American Western film directed by Lesley Selander and written by Nate Watt. The film stars William Boyd, George "Gabby" Hayes, Russell Hayden, Earle Hodgins, Charlotte Field and Billy King. The film was released on July 8, 1938, by Paramount Pictures. Pride of the West was the 17th installment in the Hopalong Cassidy series.

== Plot ==
The Sheriff gets criticised by Caldwell and Nixon for not catching a robbery commanded by themselves and their men, then the Sheriff's daughter Mary, calls for the help of Hoppy who finds the stolen money and has a plan to capture the whole gang.

== Cast ==
- William Boyd as Hopalong Cassidy
- George "Gabby" Hayes as Windy Halliday
- Russell Hayden as Lucky Jenkins
- Earle Hodgins as Sheriff Martin
- Charlotte Field as Mary Martin
- Billy King as Dick Martin
- Kenneth Harlan as Banker Caldwell
- Glenn Strange as Henchman Saunders
- James Craig as Nixon
- Bruce Mitchell as Detective
