= Stagecoach War =

1940 film

- Theatrical release poster
- Directed by: Lesley Selander
- Screenplay by: Norman Houston; Harry F. Olmsted
- Produced by: Harry Sherman
- Starring: William Boyd; Russell Hayden; Julie Carter; Harvey Stephens; J. Farrell MacDonald; Britt Wood; Rad Robinson
- Cinematography: Russell Harlan
- Edited by: Sherman A. Rose
- Music by: John Leipold
- Production company: Harry Sherman Productions
- Distributed by: Paramount Pictures
- Release date: July 12, 1940
- Running time: 63 minutes
- Country: United States
- Language: English

Stagecoach War is a 1940 American Western film directed by Lesley Selander, written by Norman Houston and Harry F. Olmsted, and starring William Boyd, Russell Hayden, Julie Carter, Harvey Stephens, J. Farrell MacDonald, Britt Wood and Rad Robinson. It was released on July 12, 1940, by Paramount Pictures.

== Cast ==
- William Boyd as Hopalong Cassidy
- Russell Hayden as Lucky Jenkins
- Julie Carter as Shirley Chapman
- Harvey Stephens as Neal Holt
- J. Farrell MacDonald as Jeff Chapman
- Britt Wood as Speedy
- Rad Robinson as Gang Leader Smiley
- Eddy Waller as Wells Fargo Agent Quince Cobalt
- Frank Lackteen as Twister Maxwell
- Jack Rockwell as Matt Gunther
- Eddie Dean as Henchman Tom
- The King's Men as Singing Outlaws
