= Ruth Miller (actress) =

American actress (1903–1981)

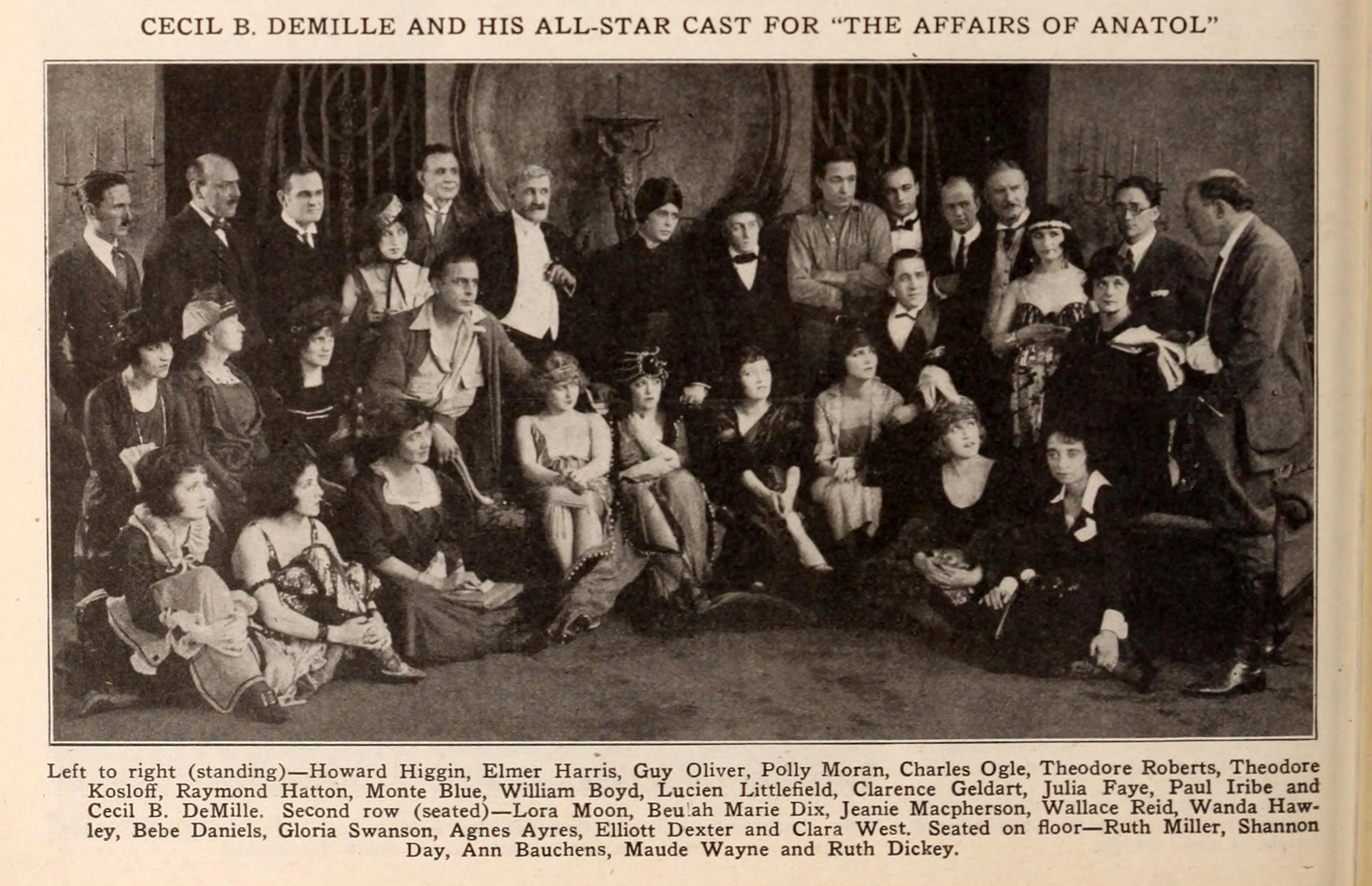
- Miller on far left in first row, cast picture from The Affairs of Anatol (1921)
- Born: March 19, 1903; Illinois, U.S.
- Died: June 13, 1981 (aged 78); Santa Monica, California, U.S.
- Occupation: Actress
- Years active: 1921–1927
- Spouse: William Boyd (m. 1921; div. 1924)

Ruth Miller (March 19, 1903 – June 13, 1981) was an American actress, known for The Sheik (1921) where she plays Zilah, The Affairs of Anatol (1921), and The King of Kings (1927). She was married to William Boyd in the 1920s.

== Filmography ==
- The Sheik (1921)
- The Affairs of Anatol (1921)
- The Volga Boatman (1926)
- The King of Kings (1927)
