= Heart of the West (film) =

1936 film by Howard Bretherton

- Directed by: Howard Bretherton
- Screenplay by: Doris Schroeder
- Based on: Mesquite Jenkins, Tumbleweed; 1932 novel by Clarence E. Mulford
- Produced by: Harry Sherman
- Starring: William Boyd; James Ellison; George "Gabby" Hayes; Sidney Blackmer; Lynn Gabriel; Fred Kohler; Warner Richmond
- Cinematography: Archie Stout
- Edited by: Edward Schroeder
- Production company: Paramount Pictures
- Distributed by: Paramount Pictures
- Release date: July 24, 1936
- Running time: 63 minutes
- Country: United States
- Language: English

Heart of the West is a 1936 American Western film directed by Howard Bretherton and written by Doris Schroeder. The film stars William Boyd, James Ellison, George "Gabby" Hayes, Sidney Blackmer, Lynn Gabriel, Fred Kohler and Warner Richmond. The film was released on July 24, 1936, by Paramount Pictures.

== Plot ==
Ranch owner Sally Jordan is engaged in a fence war with rancher Big John Trumbull. Hoppy and Johnny, along with trusty sidekick Windy, side with Sally Jordan. They control a huge cattle stampede by using dynamite and successfully fend off the Cattle Rustlers.

== Cast ==
- William Boyd as Hopalong Cassidy
- James Ellison as Johnny Nelson
- George "Gabby" Hayes as Windy Halliday
- Sidney Blackmer as John Trumbull
- Lynn Gabriel as Sally Jordan
- Fred Kohler as Barton
- Warner Richmond as Henchman Johnson
- Jack Rutherford as Henchman Tom Paterson
- Walter Miller as Henchman Whitey
- Charles Martin as Jim Jordan
- Ted Adams as Henchman Saxon
- Robert McKenzie as Tim Grady
