= Three Men from Texas =

1940 film

- Theatrical release poster
- Directed by: Lesley Selander
- Screenplay by: Norton S. Parker
- Produced by: Harry Sherman
- Starring: William Boyd; Russell Hayden; Andy Clyde; Morris Ankrum; Morgan Wallace; Thornton Edwards; Esther Estrella
- Cinematography: Russell Harlan
- Edited by: Carroll Lewis; Sherman A. Rose
- Music by: Victor Young
- Production company: Harry Sherman Productions
- Distributed by: Paramount Pictures
- Release date: November 15, 1940
- Running time: 76 minutes
- Country: United States
- Language: English

Three Men from Texas is a 1940 American Western film directed by Lesley Selander, written by Norton S. Parker, and starring William Boyd, Russell Hayden, Andy Clyde, Morris Ankrum, Morgan Wallace, Thornton Edwards and Esther Estrella. It was released on November 15, 1940, by Paramount Pictures.

== Cast ==
- William Boyd as Hopalong Cassidy
- Russell Hayden as Lucky Jenkins
- Andy Clyde as California Carlson
- Morris Ankrum as Bruce Morgan
- Morgan Wallace as Texas Ranger Captain Andrews
- Thornton Edwards as Pico Serrano
- Esther Estrella as Paquita Serrano
- Davison Clark as Ed Thompson
- Dick Curtis as Gardner
- George Lollier as Henchman Dave
- Glenn Strange as Ben Stokes
- Neyle Morrow as Juanito
