= Ladies of the Chorus =

1948 film by Phil Karlson

- Reissue theatrical poster
- Directed by: Phil Karlson
- Screenplay by: Harry Sauber; Joseph Carole
- Story by: Harry Sauber
- Produced by: Harry A. Romm
- Starring: Adele Jergens; Marilyn Monroe; Rand Brooks
- Cinematography: Frank Redman
- Edited by: Richard Fantl
- Music by: George Duning
- Production company: Columbia Pictures
- Distributed by: Columbia Pictures
- Release date: February 10, 1949
- Running time: 61 minutes
- Country: United States
- Language: English

Ladies of the Chorus is a 1948 American musical romance film directed by Phil Karlson and starring Adele Jergens, Marilyn Monroe and Rand Brooks. The screenplay, written by Harry Sauber and Joseph Carole, was based on a story by Sauber.

Released by Columbia Pictures, Ladies of the Chorus features Marilyn Monroe in the first major role of her career. Considered a B film at the time of its release, it quickly disappeared from theaters, and Monroe's contract with Columbia was not renewed.

Upon the film's original theatrical release, Adele Jergens was credited first while Marilyn Monroe was billed second. After Monroe became a star in the early 1950s, Ladies of the Chorus was reissued to capitalize on Monroe's fame. Her name was placed before the title, not only in advertising but in the opening credits of the film itself.

== Plot ==
Peggy Martin and her mother Mae both work as burlesque chorus girls. After star Bubbles LaRue quits, stage manager Joe asks Mae to perform a special number, but Mae secretly arranges for Peggy to take the opportunity. Peggy's performance is so good that she is offered the starring spot.

One evening, Randy Carroll, a member of a wealthy society family in Cleveland, is brought to a performance by friends and becomes enamored of Peggy. Learning that Peggy generally does not accept dates because her mother disapproves, Randy adopts a subtle strategy. Every night, he sends Peggy an orchid, but does not sign the card. Curious about her secret admirer, Peggy asks the florist for the sender's identity. When the florist tells her that the man is due to arrive at any moment, Peggy waits for him. After they finally meet, Randy asks Peggy to dinner and she accepts, but she first invites him to meet her mother. Randy is surprised to learn that Mae is also a dancer, but he asks her to join them for dinner. Mae declines, but waits anxiously for Peggy to return home. When Peggy appears, she excitedly informs Mae that Randy has proposed marriage.

The next day, when Randy asks Mae for her consent, she warns him that there is a class difference between him and Peggy. In response to Randy's indifference, Mae recounts the story of her marriage to a Boston socialite, Peggy's father. After their marriage, her husband's family was horrified to learn how she made her living and had the marriage annulled. Randy protests that people are more broadminded now than they were in her day, and Mae agrees to the marriage on the condition that Randy tells his mother about Peggy's profession beforehand.

Randy fails to summon the courage to tell his mother Adele about Peggy's profession. Adele is delighted that Randy has fallen in love and invites Mae and Peggy for a visit. Adele plans a lavish engagement party for all of their friends, including Mae's old friend Billy Mackay, a retired burlesque comic who has loved Mae for years. At the party, the trio of musicians that Adele has hired to entertain recognize Peggy and ask her to sing, addressing her as "Peggy, the Queen of Burlesque" in front of all of the guests. The guests are scandalized, and feeling snubbed, Peggy and Mae attempt to leave, but Adele stops them, declaring that if they run away it will only make things worse.

Adele asks Billy to help her sing a song with the trio. Later, she announces to her shocked friends that she too had been a chorus girl. Billy secretly tells Mae that Adele had concocted the story to help Randy and Peggy. As Randy and Peggy embrace, Adele persuades Billy and Mae to make it a double wedding.

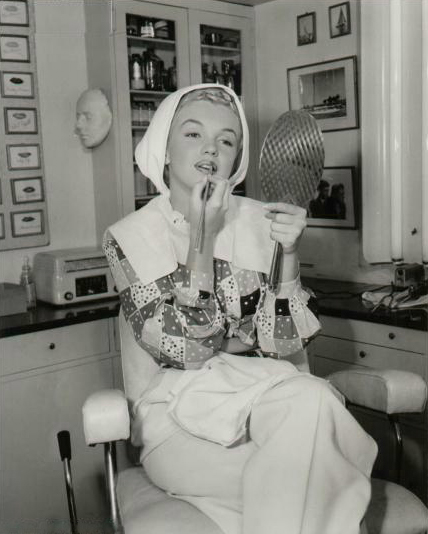
A publicity photo of Marilyn Monroe (who portrayed Peggy Martin) applying makeup on the set of the film in 1948

== Cast ==
- Adele Jergens as Mae Martin
- Marilyn Monroe as Peggy Martin
- Rand Brooks as Randy Carroll
- Nana Bryant as Mrs. Adele Carroll
- Eddie Garr as Billy Mackay
- Steven Geray as Salisbury
- The Bobby True Trio as Trio Musicians
- Kathleen O'Malley as Nita
- Dave Barry as Ripple the Decorator (uncredited)

== Soundtrack ==
Five of songs featured in the film were written by Lester Lee and Allan Roberts. The song "Ubangi Love Song" performed by the Bobby True Trio was written by Buck Ram.

Song	Actor(s)
"The Ladies of the Chorus"	Marilyn Monroe, Adele Jergens and others (Jergens' voice dubbed by Virginia Rees)
"Anyone Can See I Love You"	Marilyn Monroe
"Every Baby Needs a Da Da Daddy"	Marilyn Monroe
"I'm So Crazy for You"	Adele Jergens (dubbed by Virginia Rees)
"Ubangi Love Song"	The Bobby True Trio
"You're Never Too Old"	Nana Bryant
