= Harry Cording =

English-American actor (1891–1954)

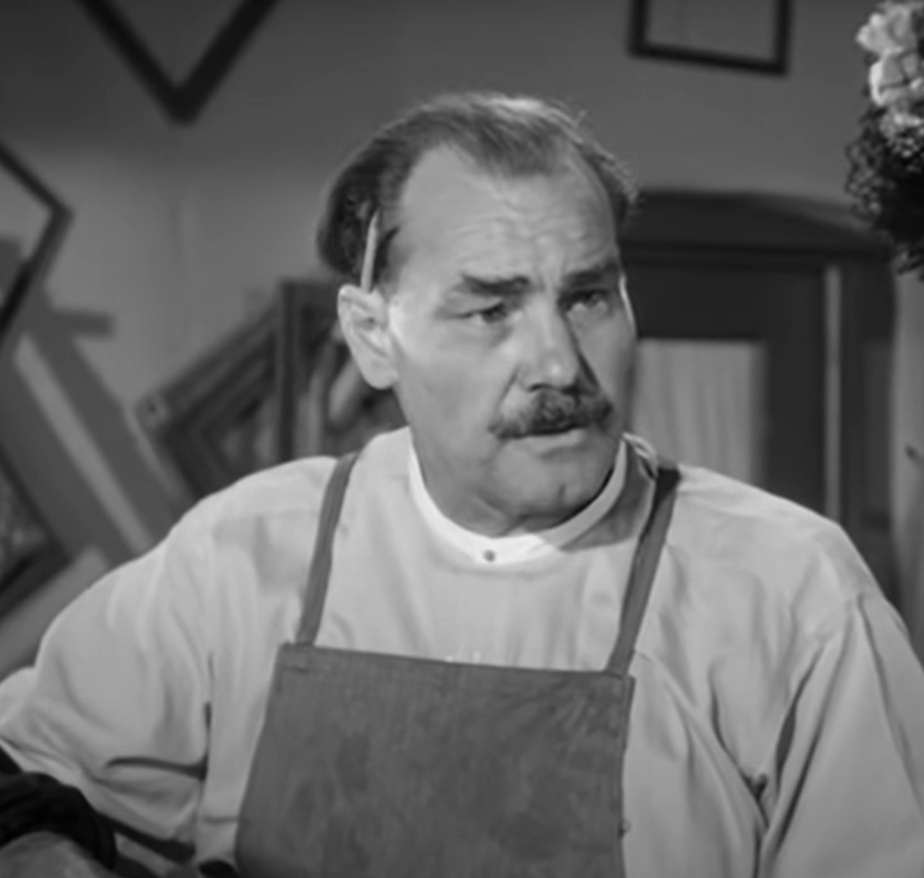
- Cording in Terror by Night (1946)
- Born: Hector William Cording; 26 April 1891; Wellington, Somerset, England
- Died: 1 September 1954 (aged 63); Sun Valley, Los Angeles, California, U.S.
- Resting place: Glen Haven & Sholom Memorial Park; Sylmar, Los Angeles, California, U.S.
- Other name: Harry Gording
- Occupation: Actor
- Years active: 1925–1954
- Spouse: Margaret Fiero (m. 1938; died 1954)
- Children: 4

Hector William "Harry" Cording (26 April 1891 – 1 September 1954) was an English actor. He is perhaps best remembered for his roles in the films The Black Cat (1934) and The Adventures of Robin Hood (1938).

== Life and career ==
Cording was born Hector William Cording on 26 April 1891 in Wellington, Somerset. He was brought up and was educated at Rugby, and he was a member of the British Army in World War I. In 1919, he became steward for a British steamship line whose ships, such as the Vauban and the Calamares, which he had worked on, frequently called at the Port of New York. After a number of trips, he resigned and decided to stay in the United States. He later settled permanently in Los Angeles, where he began a film career. His first role was as a henchman in The Knockout (1925), followed by similar roles over the next few years.

Cording appeared in many Hollywood films from the 1920s to the 1950s. With a six-foot height, stocky build, and dark eyes, Cording very often portrayed thugs, villains' henchmen and policemen. Cording's most notable roles were probably as the villainous Dickon Malbete, Captain of the Guard in Errol Flynn's Adventures of Robin Hood and as Thamal, the hulking henchman to Bela Lugosi's character in 1934's Black Cat. As a contract player at Universal Pictures in the 1940s, he turned up in tiny parts in many of their horror films, such as The Wolf Man.

Having appeared in a bit role in 20th Century-Fox's Adventures of Sherlock Holmes starring Basil Rathbone (1939), he went on to appear in supporting and bit parts in seven of the twelve Universal Studios Sherlock Holmes films in which Rathbone starred. In the 1952 western The Big Trees, he served as the antagonist to Kirk Douglas' character.

Cording died on 1 September 1954. The cause of death was not documented. His wife was Margaret Cording, née Fiero, (1912–1991), a native of Michigan; their daughter, Margaret Rose, was born on 7 November 1939. The Cordings lived at 4104 Farmdale Avenue, North Hollywood. Harry Cording was an active member of the Loyal Order of Moose fraternity.

Cording is buried in Glen Haven Memorial Park in Sylmar, California.

== Filmography ==
- The Shock Punch (1925) - Construction Site Security Guard (uncredited) (film debut)
- The Knockout (1925) - Steve McKenna
- Black Jack (1927) - Haskins
- Turkish Delight (1927) - (uncredited)
- Daredevil's Reward (1928) - Second Heavy
- The Last Command (1928) - Revolutionist (uncredited)
- Four Sons (1928) - (uncredited)
- Feel My Pulse (1928) - Rum-Running Boatman (uncredited)
- The Patriot (1928) - Stefan
- Sins of the Fathers (1928) - The Hijacker
- The Rescue (1929) - Belarab
- The Squall (1929) - Peter
- The Isle of Lost Ships (1929) - Gallagher
- Christina (1929) - Dick Torpe
- Captain of the Guard (1930) - Le Bruin
- Bride of the Regiment (1930) - Sgt. Dostal
- Women Everywhere (1930) - Legionnaire in Cafe (uncredited)
- Rough Romance (1930) - Chick Carson
- New Moon (1930) - Kirghiz Soldier at Fort Darvaz (uncredited)
- The Right of Way (1931) - Rouge's Henchman (uncredited)
- The Conquering Horde (1931) - Butch Daggett
- I Like Your Nerve (1931) - San Arango Officer (uncredited)
- Honor of the Family (1931) - Kouski
- The Sea Ghost (1931) - Sailor Who Knocks Out Capt. Winter (uncredited)
- Over the Hill (1931) - Townsman (uncredited)
- Mata Hari (1931) - Ivan (uncredited)
- Night Beat (1931) - Chill Scarpelli
- Texas Cyclone (1932) - Jake Farwell
- The World and the Flesh (1932) - Ivanovitch
- Forgotten Commandments (1932) - Officer (uncredited)
- Merrily We Go to Hell (1932) - Fred - Bartender (uncredited)
- My Pal, the King (1932) - Palace Guard (uncredited)
- Fighting for Justice (1932) - Henchman (uncredited)
- The Cabin in the Cotton (1932) - Ross Clinton (uncredited)
- The Face on the Barroom Floor (1932) - Steve the Doorman (uncredited)
- Scarlet Dawn (1932) - Revolutionary (uncredited)
- Secrets of the French Police (1932) - Man Reading Newspaper (uncredited)
- File 113 (1933) - Michele
- Tonight Is Ours (1933) - Assassin #1 (uncredited)
- The Intruder (1933) - Cramer
- Sweepings (1933) - Customer (uncredited)
- Trick for Trick (1933) - Dredger (uncredited)
- The Girl in 419 (1933) - Henchman Driver (uncredited)
- The Man Who Dared (1933) - Coal Mine Boss (uncredited)
- Captured! (1933) - First Orderly
- Narcotic (1933) - Dr. William G. Davis
- To the Last Man (1933) - Colby Man Fred (uncredited)
- Roman Scandals (1933) - Valerius' Soldier (uncredited)
- The House of Rothschild (1934) - Man in 1780 Sequence (uncredited)
- Viva Villa! (1934) - Majordomo (uncredited)
- The Black Cat (1934) - Thamal
- The Count of Monte Cristo (1934) - Jailer (uncredited)
- Treasure Island (1934) - Henry - Pirate (uncredited)
- Great Expectations (1934) - Orlick
- We Live Again (1934) - Jailer (uncredited)
- Strange Wives (1934) - Tribesman
- The Man Who Reclaimed His Head (1934) - French Mechanic (uncredited)
- The Lives of a Bengal Lancer (1935) - Sentry (uncredited)
- Charlie Chan in Paris (1935) - Gendarme Arresting Yvette (uncredited)
- The Mystery of Edwin Drood (1935) - Turke - Opium Addict (uncredited)
- Naughty Marietta (1935) - Pirate (uncredited)
- Les Misérables (1935) - Beam Warder (uncredited)
- Black Fury (1935) - Louie - a Miner (uncredited)
- Lady Tubbs (1935) - Polack (uncredited)
- The Crusades (1935) - Amir (uncredited)
- Anna Karenina (1935) - Officer at Banquet (uncredited)
- Ladies Love Danger (1935) - Stagehand (uncredited)
- Peter Ibbetson (1935) - Guard (uncredited)
- Mutiny on the Bounty (1935) - Soldier (uncredited)
- Ship Cafe (1935) - Stoker (uncredited)
- Captain Blood (1935) - Kent
- Riffraff (1936) - Joe - Agitator (uncredited)
- Road Gang (1936) - Sam Dawson
- Sutter's Gold (1936) - Seaman Lars (uncredited)
- The Country Doctor (1936) - Logger (uncredited)
- The White Angel (1936) - Hospital Storekeeper (uncredited)
- Suzy (1936) - Madame Eyrelle's Chauffeur (uncredited)
- The Last of the Mohicans (1936) - Trapper (uncredited)
- The Magnificent Brute (1936) - Customer Demetrios (uncredited)
- Daniel Boone (1936) - Joe Burch
- You Only Live Once (1937) - Guard (uncredited)
- Maid of Salem (1937) - Guard (uncredited)
- Sea Devils (1937) - Sailor (uncredited)
- The Soldier and the Lady (1937) - Peasant (uncredited)
- The Prince and the Pauper (1937) - Second Guard
- The Road Back (1937) - Attendant (uncredited)
- Fit for a King (1937) - Thug (uncredited)
- Conquest (1937) - Cossack (uncredited)
- The Adventures of Marco Polo (1938) - Kaidu Officer (uncredited)
- Crime School (1938) - Jim - the Second Guard (uncredited)
- The Adventures of Robin Hood (1938) - Dickon Malbete
- Marie Antoinette (1938) - Executioner (uncredited)
- Painted Desert (1938) - Henchman Burke
- Valley of the Giants (1938) - Greer
- Heart of the North (1938) - Miner Leading Mob (uncredited)
- A Christmas Carol (1938) - Waiter (uncredited)
- Stand Up and Fight (1939) - Bullet Line Blacksmith (uncredited)
- Devil's Island (1939) - Guard Accepting Bribe (uncredited)
- Son of Frankenstein (1939) - Bearded Gendarme (uncredited)
- Arizona Legion (1939) - Whiskey Joe
- The Adventures of Huckleberry Finn (1939) - Man Stealing Watermelon (uncredited)
- North of the Yukon (1939) - MacGregor
- Racketeers of the Range (1939) - Scarface Pete (uncredited)
- The Sun Never Sets (1939) - Zurof Camp Guard (uncredited)
- Each Dawn I Die (1939) - Temple
- Mutiny on the Blackhawk (1939) - Bos'un (uncredited)
- The Adventures of Sherlock Holmes (1939) - Cragin (uncredited)
- Outpost of the Mounties (1939) - Trapper Mac (uncredited)
- The Marshal of Mesa City (1939) - Bat Cardigan - Henchman
- Rulers of the Sea (1939) - Seaman (uncredited)
- Tower of London (1939) - Lead Murderer of the Children (uncredited)
- We Are Not Alone (1939) - Man Carrying Leni (uncredited)
- Destry Rides Again (1939) - Creepy - Lends Tom Guns (uncredited)
- The Light That Failed (1939) - Soldier (uncredited)
- The Hunchback of Notre Dame (1939) - Guard (uncredited)
- The Invisible Man Returns (1940) - Miner Saying 'Keep the Wig on Willie' (uncredited)
- The Grapes of Wrath (1940) - Deputy (uncredited)
- Little Old New York (1940) - Man in Mob About to Set 'Clermont' Afire (uncredited)
- The House of the Seven Gables (1940) - Blacksmith Hawkins (uncredited)
- Strange Cargo (1940) - Guard (uncredited)
- Virginia City (1940) - Scarecrow - Union Prisoner at Libby (uncredited)
- Dark Command (1940) - Angry Townsman in Bank (uncredited)
- Texas Stagecoach (1940) - Clancy
- Florian (1940) - Leader (uncredited)
- Passport to Alcatraz (1940) - Jeffers
- The Sea Hawk (1940) - Slavemaster
- When the Daltons Rode (1940) - Rigby Henchman (uncredited)
- Stage to Chino (1940) - Pete - Henchman
- King of the Royal Mounted (1940, Serial) - Wade Garson
- A Dispatch from Reuters (1940) - Sailor on the Nova Scotian (uncredited)
- Law and Order (1940) - Poe Daggett
- Trail of the Vigilantes (1940) - Phil
- The Great Plane Robbery (1940) - Eddie Lindo
- Santa Fe Trail (1940) - Workman in Delaware Crossing (uncredited)
- The Green Hornet Strikes Again! (1940, Serial) - Dannick - Crooked Construction Foreman (uncredited)
- The San Francisco Docks (1940) - Collins (uncredited)
- So Ends Our Night (1941) - Card Player (uncredited)
- Rage in Heaven (1941) - Workers' Delegate #1 (uncredited)
- Back in the Saddle (1941) - Brawler (uncredited)
- Bury Me Not on the Prairie (1941) - J. L. Red Clinton
- The Lady from Cheyenne (1941) - Mike, Cork's Henchman (uncredited)
- Mutiny in the Arctic (1941) - Harmon
- Singapore Woman (1941) - Crow's Nest Manager (uncredited)
- They Met in Bombay (1941) - Corporal at Base (uncredited)
- Raiders of the Desert (1941) - Rawlins
- Rawhide Rangers (1941) - Blackie
- Badlands of Dakota (1941) - Jackson (uncredited)
- Lydia (1941) - Hotel House Detective (uncredited)
- The Wolf Man (1941) - Wykes (uncredited)
- Riders of the Badlands (1941) - Higgins
- Son of Fury: The Story of Benjamin Blake (1942) - Turnkey (uncredited)
- Wild Bill Hickok Rides (1942) - Saloon Bouncer (uncredited)
- Ride 'Em Cowboy (1942) - Poker Player (uncredited)
- The Ghost of Frankenstein (1942) - Frone (uncredited)
- The Spoilers (1942) - Miner (uncredited)
- The Voice of Terror (1942) - Camberwell - Basement Dive Patron (uncredited)
- Overland Mail (1942) - Sam Gregg - Henchman
- A Yank at Eton (1942) - Bartender (uncredited)
- The Mummy's Tomb (1942) - Vic - Farmer (uncredited)
- Road to Morocco (1942) - Warrior (uncredited)
- Pittsburgh (1942) - Miner (uncredited)
- Sherlock Holmes and the Secret Weapon (1942) - Jack Brady (uncredited)
- Arabian Nights (1942) - Blacksmith
- Tennessee Johnson (1942) - Captain McGruder (uncredited)
- Chetniks! The Fighting Guerrillas (1943) - German Sergeant (uncredited)
- The Moon Is Down (1943) - Albert - Miner (uncredited)
- Mission to Moscow (1943) - Blacksmith (uncredited)
- Two Tickets to London (1943) - Sutliff (uncredited)
- Fugitive from Sonora (1943) - Iron Joe Martin
- For Whom the Bell Tolls (1943) - Man Who Flails the Mayor (uncredited)
- The Man from Down Under (1943) - Bettor (uncredited)
- The Man from the Rio Grande (1943) - John King
- There's Something About a Soldier (1943) - Jan's Friend (uncredited)
- The Spider Woman (1943) - Fred Garvin - Henchman on Roof (uncredited)
- Klondike Kate (1943) - Irate Miner Gambler (uncredited)
- The Song of Bernadette (1943) - Stonemason (uncredited)
- Ali Baba and the Forty Thieves (1944) - Mahmoud
- The Impostor (1944) - Freighter Captain (uncredited)
- Phantom Lady (1944) - Courtroom Spectator Next to Carol (uncredited)
- Passage to Marseille (1944) - Chief Guard (uncredited)
- The Great Alaskan Mystery (1944, Serial) - Captain Greeder [Chs. 1-3]
- The Hour Before the Dawn (1944) - Sam (uncredited)
- The Pearl of Death (1944) - George Gelder (uncredited)
- Gypsy Wildcat (1944) - Captain Marver
- Kismet (1944) - Policeman (uncredited)
- An American Romance (1944) - Workman in Meeting (uncredited)
- Mrs. Parkington (1944) - Humphrey
- Lost in a Harem (1944) - Police Chief (uncredited)
- Bluebeard (1944) - Policeman (uncredited)
- The Man in Half Moon Street (1945) - First Bobby (uncredited)
- Jungle Queen (1945, Serial) - Husky Deck Sailor (uncredited)
- The House of Fear (1945) - John Simpson
- Sudan (1945) - Uba
- The Fatal Witness (1945) - Gus, pubkeeper
- Confidential Agent (1945) - Rugged 'Detective' (uncredited)
- Captain Kidd (1945) - Newgate Prison Warder (uncredited)
- San Antonio (1945) - Hawker (uncredited)
- The Fighting Guardsman (1946) - Tax Collector (uncredited)
- Terror by Night (1946) - Mock the coffin maker (uncredited)
- The Bandit of Sherwood Forest (1946) - Prioress Guard (uncredited)
- Devotion (1946) - Coachman with Frightened Horses (uncredited)
- Night in Paradise (1946) - Captain (uncredited)
- Dressed to Kill (1946) - Hamid
- Inside Job (1946) - Bartender (uncredited)
- Hot Cargo (1946) - Matt Wayne
- The Verdict (1946) - Tough Englishman (uncredited)
- Renegade Girl (1946) - Miller
- Fool's Gold (1946) - Henchman Duke
- California (1947) - Miner (uncredited)
- Calcutta (1947) - Tea Planter (uncredited)
- The Imperfect Lady (1947) - Policeman (uncredited)
- Dangerous Venture (1947) - Dan Morgan
- The Marauders (1947) - Riker
- Slave Girl (1947) - Guard Captain (uncredited)
- Unconquered (1947) - Garth's Marksman (uncredited)
- The Exile (1947) - Roundhead (uncredited)
- Forever Amber (1947) - Minor Role (uncredited)
- Trail of the Mounties (1947) - Trapper Hawkins
- The Swordsman (1948) - Blacksmith (uncredited)
- A Woman's Vengeance (1948) - Chauffeur McNabb
- The Black Arrow (1948) - Guard (uncredited)
- Dangers of the Canadian Mounted (1948) - Track Heavy #2 (uncredited)
- 13 Lead Soldiers (1948) - Edward Vane
- Tap Roots (1948) - Leader (uncredited)
- A Southern Yankee (1948) - Guerrilla Horseman (uncredited)
- That Lady in Ermine (1948) - Orlando - Ancestor (uncredited)
- Red River (1948) - Gambler (uncredited)
- Kiss the Blood Off My Hands (1948) - Policeman (uncredited)
- Bad Men of Tombstone (1949) - Miner (uncredited)
- The Fighting O'Flynn (1949) - Pat
- Lust for Gold (1949) - Joe (uncredited)
- The Secret of St. Ives (1949) - Innkeeper (uncredited)
- Rope of Sand (1949) - Guard (uncredited)
- Challenge to Lassie (1949) - Adam, the Blacksmith (uncredited)
- Samson and Delilah (1949) - Prince (uncredited)
- Tyrant of the Sea (1950) - Sampson Edwards - Sailor
- Buccaneer's Girl (1950) - Man in Pub (uncredited)
- Cargo to Capetown (1950) - Engine Room Oiler (uncredited)
- Fortunes of Captain Blood (1950) - Will Ward
- Rogues of Sherwood Forest (1950) - Officer Posting Decree (uncredited)
- Convicted (1950) - Convict in Prison Yard (uncredited)
- Indian Territory (1950) - Soldier (uncredited)
- Copper Canyon (1950) - Miner (uncredited)
- Last of the Buccaneers (1950) - Sailor Cragg Brown
- Al Jennings of Oklahoma (1951) - Mike Bridges
- Up Front (1951) - Minor Role
- Santa Fe (1951) - Moose Legrande
- Sirocco (1951) - Master Sergeant (uncredited)
- Mask of the Avenger (1951) - Zio d'Orsini
- Iron Man (1951) - Miner (uncredited)
- The Strange Door (1951) - Guard (uncredited)
- The Big Trees (1952) - Cleve Gregg
- Night Stage to Galveston (1952) - Ted Driscoll
- The San Francisco Story (1952) - Card Player (uncredited)
- Brave Warrior (1952) - Shayne MacGregor
- Cripple Creek (1952) - Miner Hibbs (uncredited)
- Ma and Pa Kettle at the Fair (1952) - Ed (uncredited)
- Captain Pirate (1952) - Col. Ramsey's Overseer (uncredited)
- Plymouth Adventure (1952) - Aide to Head Constable (uncredited)
- Road to Bali (1952) - Verna's Father (uncredited)
- Against All Flags (1952) - Gow
- Androcles and the Lion (1952) - Soldier (uncredited)
- Treasure of the Golden Condor (1953) - Breton (uncredited)
- Rogue's March (1953) - Fish Cleaner (uncredited)
- Titanic (1953) - Boiler Room Engineer (uncredited)
- Ambush at Tomahawk Gap (1953) - Stableman (uncredited)
- Law and Order (1953) - Townsman (uncredited)
- Abbott and Costello Meet Dr. Jekyll and Mr. Hyde (1953) - Rough Character in Park (uncredited)
- Here Come the Girls (1953) - Laundry Facility Engineer (uncredited)
- Man in the Attic (1953) - Detective Sgt. Bates
- Demetrius and the Gladiators (1954) - Guard-Escort of Prisoners (uncredited)
- King Richard and the Crusaders (1954) - Castelaine Spokesman (uncredited)
- Killer Leopard (1954) - Supt. Saunders (uncredited)
- The Black Shield of Falworth (1954) - Captain of King's Guards (uncredited)
- Down Three Dark Streets (1954) - Man Getting Rubdown (uncredited)
- Jungle Gents (1954) - Dan Shanks
- East of Eden (1955) - Bouncer (uncredited) (final film role)
