= Andy Clyde =

Scottish and American actor (1892–1967)

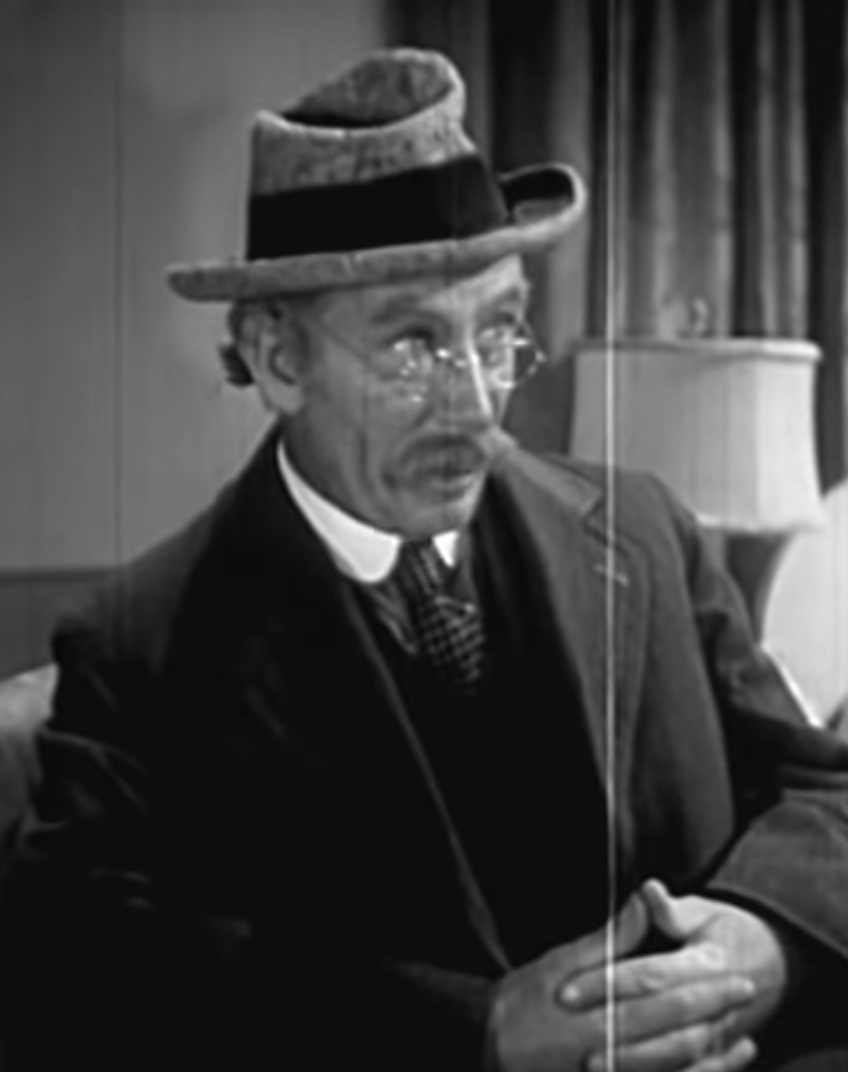
- Clyde in Red Lights Ahead (1936)
- Born: Andrew Allan Clyde; March 25, 1892; Blairgowrie, Perthshire, Scotland
- Died: May 18, 1967 (aged 75); Los Angeles, California, U.S.
- Resting place: Forest Lawn Memorial Park, Glendale, California
- Occupation: Actor
- Years active: 1921–1966
- Spouse: Elsie Maud Tarron (m. 1932)
- Children: 1

Andrew Allan Clyde (March 25, 1892 – May 18, 1967) was a Scottish and American film and television actor whose career spanned some 45 years. In 1921 he broke into silent films as a Mack Sennett comic, debuting in On a Summer Day. He was the fifth of six children of theatrical actor, producer and manager John Clyde. Clyde's brother David and his sister Jean also became screen actors.

Clyde worked as California Carlson in the Hopalong Cassidy movie series and starred in 79 comedy shorts for Columbia Pictures from 1934-1956. He also had recurring roles in two television series: the farmer Cully Wilson in CBS's Lassie and as the neighbor George MacMichael on ABC's The Real McCoys.

== Acting career ==
=== Theatre and film ===
At age 19 Clyde toured Scotland with Durward Lely & Company, playing Connor Martin in the romantic Irish musical costume drama The Wearin’ o’ the Green. In 1912, Clyde first came to the United States on tour in the Graham Moffat Players, playing the part of Bob Dewar in a vaudeville comedy sketch depicting tenement life in Glasgow called The Concealed Bed. Years later, at the invitation of his close friend James Finlayson, he returned to the United States in 1920 to join producer Mack Sennett's roster of comedians.

Clyde's mastery of makeup allowed him tremendous versatility; he could play everything from grubby young guttersnipes to old crackpot scientists. He hit upon an "old man" characterization in his short comedies, and it was immediately successful. Adopting a gray wig and mustache, he used this makeup for the rest of his short-subject career, and the character was so durable that he literally grew into it. He starred in short comedies longer than any other actor (32 years, 1924–56).

He made a successful transition to sound films while working for Sennett. In 1932, when the Sennett studio was facing financial problems, Sennett cut Clyde's salary. Clyde objected and left the studio. Sennett then put the "old man" costume on character actor Irving Bacon. Audiences saw through the masquerade, and Sennett abandoned the character. Educational Pictures, Sennett's distributor, took over the Andy Clyde series, which continued for two more years.

Columbia Pictures launched its short subject department in 1934 and Clyde was one of the first comedy stars signed by producer Jules White. Unlike many of the Columbia short-subject comedians who indulged in broad facial and physical gestures, Clyde was subtler and more economical: his comic timing was so good that he could merely lift an eyebrow, shudder slightly, or mutter "My, my, my" for humorous effect.

Clyde also kept busy as a character actor in feature films. He almost always appeared as a supporting actor: for example, he played a sad provincial constable in the Katharine Hepburn film The Little Minister and Charles Coburn's drinking buddy in The Green Years. He did play a couple of leads for low-budget, independent producers: the comedy Red Lights Ahead (1935) and the western Sundown Riders (1944).

By the 1940s, Clyde had been gravitating toward outdoor and Western adventures. Clyde is well remembered for his roles as a comic sidekick. He was most often associated with William Boyd in the Hopalong Cassidy series, as "California Carlson" (a role he also played in the Hopalong Cassidy radio series). He stayed with the Cassidy feature films until the series lapsed in 1948. Clyde also worked on the Hopalong Cassidy "record readers" issued by Capitol Records in the 1950s. Clyde's home studio, Columbia, cast Clyde prominently in feature-length musical westerns of the mid-1940s.

In 1949 Clyde became the comic sidekick to Monogram Pictures' newest cowboy star Whip Wilson. They worked together through 1951. In 1955 Clyde signed with Republic Pictures for two features, a Judy Canova comedy and a John Payne western.

Through the years Clyde was still starring in his two-reel comedies for Columbia, where he had been making six shorts annually. This was modified in 1942 to four per year, then in 1945 to three per year, and finally in 1947 to two per year, which became Clyde's standard schedule for the next nine years. These reductions were not due to any loss in Clyde's popularity; gradual budget cuts forced the studio to make fewer short subjects. From the mid-1940s, the studio was able to produce lower-budgeted remakes, editing older scenes into the new ones. You Were Never Uglier (1944), for example, was remade in 1952 as Hooked and Rooked, with Clyde and Emmett Lynn repeating their roles in the new sequences, but with new female co-stars replacing the vintage-1944 players. Clyde was such an audience favorite that he continued to star in Columbia shorts through 1956, when his last theatrical film was released (the short subject Pardon My Nightshirt). With his history of 79 Columbia shorts, he outlasted every comedian on the Columbia payroll except The Three Stooges.

=== Television career ===
Clyde began working in the new TV industry in 1952, making guest appearances in established series. He appeared in Rod Cameron's syndicated series City Detective. On The Pepsi-Cola Playhouse and Studio 57 in 1954 and 1955, respectively, he portrayed Tom Harper in the episode "Santa's Old Suit," with co-star Jane Darwell. Clyde guested in several other early series as well, including The People's Choice, Soldiers of Fortune, My Little Margie, The Bob Cummings Show, and (as a crafty rural detective) Lock-Up.

He appeared in two children's programs: as Colonel Jack in four episodes of Circus Boy and as Homer Tubbs in four segments of ABC's western series The Adventures of Rin-Tin-Tin.

In 1959, Clyde portrayed millionaire "Andrew C. Cooley" in the CBS fantasy drama The Millionaire. In 1961, on CBS's The Andy Griffith Show, Clyde played Frank Myers, an eccentric old man whom the town tries to evict in the episode "Mayberry Goes Bankrupt". In 1964, Clyde reunited with Walter Brennan for one episode of the new ABC series, The Tycoon.

In 1962–1963, Clyde portrayed Dr. Parkinson in three episodes of the NBC medical drama Dr. Kildare, starring Richard Chamberlain.

Clyde often worked in TV westerns. In Rory Calhoun's CBS western series The Texan, he played Wild Jack Hastings in "The Troubled Town" and in additional segments as the character Andy Miles. Clyde further guest-starred in such westerns as Wagon Train, Tales of the Texas Rangers, The Restless Gun, Jefferson Drum, Buckskin, Fury, Shotgun Slade, and The Life and Legend of Wyatt Earp (as Billy Buckett). In 1959, Clyde played Captain Gibbs in two segments of the ABC/Warner Brothers western series Colt .45. As "Scatterbrain Gibbs", he appeared with Tol Avery as Barnes in "Queen of Dixie"; in the story line, series character Christopher Colt (Wayde Preston) is aboard a Mississippi River gambling boat and encounters a ring of counterfeiters. Clyde subsequently played "Captain Gibbs" in the episode "Yellow Terror", with Brad Dexter in the role of John Barker. Clyde and Denver Pyle were cast in the 1960 episode "The Man Who Wanted Everything" of the ABC western drama The Man from Blackhawk, starring Robert Rockwell as a roving insurance investigator. On CBS's long-running western series Gunsmoke, Clyde portrayed Poney Thompson in "Snakebite" in 1958 and Henry Squires in "Durham Bull" in 1962.

=== As series regular or semi-regular ===
Andy Clyde worked steadily in four TV series. It is for these series that he is best known among TV fans. In 1957 he became a recurring cast member of The Real McCoys as George MacMichael, the friendly neighbor of "Grandpa Amos McCoy" (Walter Brennan). Clyde worked well opposite Brennan, with the devious Amos usually entangling George in his latest ideas between games of checkers.

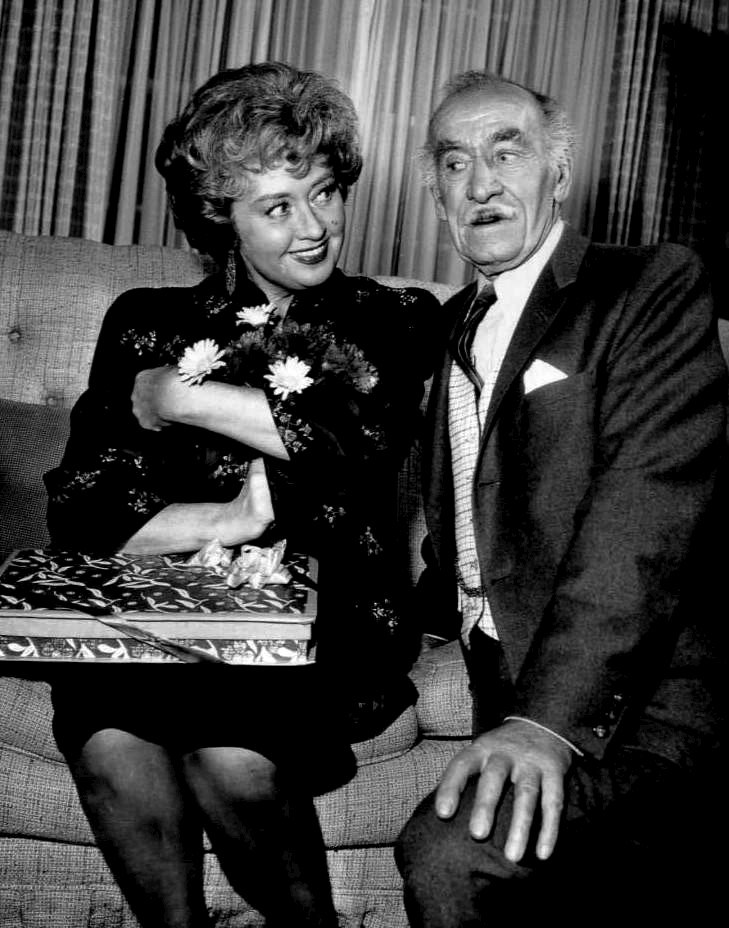
Clyde as George MacMichael, charmed by Joan Blondell as the McCoys' Aunt Win

In 1959, concurrently with the McCoys series, Clyde joined the Lassie series as the eccentric farmer and nature lover Cully Wilson, the friend to Timmy Martin, portrayed by child actor Jon Provost. After the Martin family was written out of the series, Cully became the dog's temporary guardian in several episodes before the series shifted to a forest-ranger format.

From 1960 to 1962, Clyde was cast as the farmer Pa McBeam in five episodes of the NBC western series The Tall Man, starring Barry Sullivan and Clu Gulager. Judy Nugent plays McBean's daughter, June. In three episodes, Olive Sturgess played daughter May McBeam. In "The Reluctant Bridegroom" (February 18, 1961), Ellen Corby is featured as Hannah Blossom, a potential mail order bride, for Pa McBeam. Through a fraudulent letter written by the McBeam daughters, Hannah is lured to Lincoln, New Mexico, the setting of the series, to seek out the potential husband. In "Substitute Sheriff" (January 6, 1962), the McBeam daughters enlist their father as an acting sheriff in a scheme to thwart the seizure of their property for right-of-way by the railroad. Bob Hastings appears in this episode as J. S. Chase.

In 1964-65 Clyde appeared as Grandpa Jim Anderson in five episodes of the ABC military comedy No Time for Sergeants, starring Sammy Jackson. The series was inspired by an earlier Andy Griffith film of the same name.

== Personal life and death ==
On September 23, 1932, Clyde married Elsie Maud Tarron, a former member of the Sennett Bathing Beauties, in Ontario, California. The director Jules White recalled that Clyde became a father in middle age, and was devastated when his son, John Allan Clyde, died of meningitis at age nine.

Clyde was close friends with Ben Turpin, serving as the witness at Turpin's second marriage and a pallbearer at his funeral.

He became a naturalized United States citizen on September 24, 1943.

Clyde continued to perform on television until his death of natural causes on May 18, 1967. His remains are interred at Forest Lawn Memorial Park in Glendale, California.

== Legacy ==
On February 8, 1960, Clyde received a star on the Hollywood Walk of Fame at 6758 Hollywood Boulevard, for his contribution to the motion pictures industry.

== Selected filmography ==
- A Small Town Idol (1921) as Minor role (uncredited)
- Bow-Wow (1922) as The City Slicker
- Picking Peaches as Near-sighted Customer
- The Hollywood Kid (1924) - Studio Spy
- The Girl from Everywhere (1927) as Publicity Man
- The Branded Man (1928) as Jenkins
- The Good-Bye Kiss (1928) as The Grandfather
- Should a Girl Marry? (1928) as Harry
- Ships of the Night (1928) as Alec
- Blindfold (1928) as Funeral
- Midnight Daddies (1930) as Wilbur Louder
- Million Dollar Legs (1932) as Major-Domo
- The Little Minister (1934) as Wearyworld the policeman
- Romance in Manhattan (1935) as Liquor Store Owner (uncredited)
- Annie Oakley (1935) as James MacIvor
- McFadden's Flats (1935) as Jock McTavish
- Village Tale (1935) as Storekeeper
- The Bishop Misbehaves (1935) (scenes deleted)
- Yellow Dust (1936) as Silas 'Solitaire' Carter
- Straight from the Shoulder (1936) as J. M. Pyne
- Two in a Crowd (1936) as Jonesy
- Red Lights Ahead (1936) as Grandpa Hawkins
- The Barrier (1937) 'No-Creek' Lee
- It's a Wonderful World (1939) as 'Gimpy' Wilson
- Bad Lands (1939) as Cluff
- Abe Lincoln in Illinois (1940) as Stage Driver
- Cherokee Strip (1940) as Tex Crawford
- Three Men from Texas (1940) as California Carlson
- Doomed Caravan (1941) as California Jack
- In Old Colorado (1941) as California Carlson
- Border Vigilantes (1941) as California Carlson
- Pirates on Horseback (1941) as California Carlson
- Wide Open Town (1941) as California Carlson
- Stick to Your Guns (1941) as California Carlson
- Riders of the Timberline (1941) as California Carlson
- Twilight on the Trail (1941) as California Carlson
- Outlaws of the Desert (1941) as California Carlson
- Secret of the Wastelands (1941) as California Carlson
- This Above All (1942) as Fireman (uncredited)
- Undercover Man (1942) as California Carlson
- Lost Canyon (1942) as California Carlson
- Hoppy Serves a Writ (1943) as California Carlson
- Border Patrol (1943) as California Carlson
- The Leather Burners (1943) as California Carlson
- Colt Comrades (1943) as California Carlson
- Bar 20 (1943) as California Carlson
- False Colors (1943) as California Carlson
- Riders of the Deadline (1943) as California Carlson
- Texas Masquerade (1944) as California Carlson
- Lumberjack (1944) as California Carlson
- Mystery Man (1944) as California Carlson
- Forty Thieves (1944) as Deputy California Carlson
- Sundown Riders (1944) as Andy
- Roughly Speaking (1945) as Matt (uncredited)
- Song of the Prairie (1945) as Uncle And Tyler
- Throw a Saddle on a Star (1946) as Pop Walker
- The Green Years (1946) as Saddler Boag
- That Texas Jamboree (1946) as Andy Warren
- Plainsman and the Lady (1946) as Durango
- The Devil's Playground as California Carlson
- Unexpected Guest (1947) as California Carlson
- Dangerous Venture (1947) as California Carlson
- The Marauders (1947) as California Carlson
- Hoppy's Holiday (1947) as California Carlson
- Fool's Gold (1947) as California Carlson
- Silent Conflict (1948) as California Carlson
- The Dead Don't Dream (1948) as California Carlson
- Sinister Journey (1948) as California Carlson
- Borrowed Trouble (1948) as California Carlson
- False Paradise (1948) as California Carlson
- Strange Gamble (1948) as California Carlson
- Crashing Thru (1949) as Winks Winkle
- Shadows of the West (1949) as Winks Grayson
- Big Jack (1949) as Putt Cleghorn (uncredited)
- Haunted Trails (1949) as Trigger Winks
- Riders of the Dusk (1949) as Winks Holliday
- Range Land (1949) as Winks
- Fence Riders (1950) as Winks McGee
- Gunslingers (1950) as Winks McGee
- Arizona Territory (1950) as Marshal Luke Watson
- Silver Raiders (1950) as Sheriff J. Quincy Jones
- Cherokee Uprising (1950) as Deputy Marshal Jake Jones
- Outlaws of Texas (1950) as U.S. Marshal Hungry Rogers
- Abilene Trail (1951) as Sagebrush Charlie
- Carolina Cannonball (1955) as Grandpa Rutherford
- The Road to Denver (1955) as Whipsaw Ellis
