= The Wyoming Bandit =

1949 film by Philip Ford

- Theatrical release poster
- Directed by: Philip Ford
- Screenplay by: M. Coates Webster
- Produced by: Gordon Kay
- Starring: Allan Lane; Eddy Waller; Trevor Bardette; Victor Kilian; Rand Brooks; William Haade
- Cinematography: John MacBurnie
- Edited by: Harold Minter
- Music by: Stanley Wilson
- Production company: Republic Pictures
- Distributed by: Republic Pictures
- Release date: July 15, 1949
- Running time: 60 minutes
- Country: United States
- Language: English

The Wyoming Bandit is a 1949 American Western film directed by Philip Ford and written by M. Coates Webster. The film stars Allan Lane, Eddy Waller, Trevor Bardette, Victor Kilian, Rand Brooks and William Haade. The film was released on July 15, 1949, by Republic Pictures.

== Cast ==
- Allan Lane as Rocky Lane
- Black Jack as Black Jack
- Eddy Waller as Nugget Clark
- Trevor Bardette as Wyoming Dan
- Victor Kilian as Ross Tyler
- Rand Brooks as Jimmy Howard
- William Haade as Henchman Lonnigan
- Harold Goodwin as Sheriff
- Lane Bradford as Henchman Buck
- Robert J. Wilke as Henchman Sam
- John Hamilton as Marshal
- Edmund Cobb as Deputy Marshal
