= William Boyd (actor) =

American actor (1895–1972)

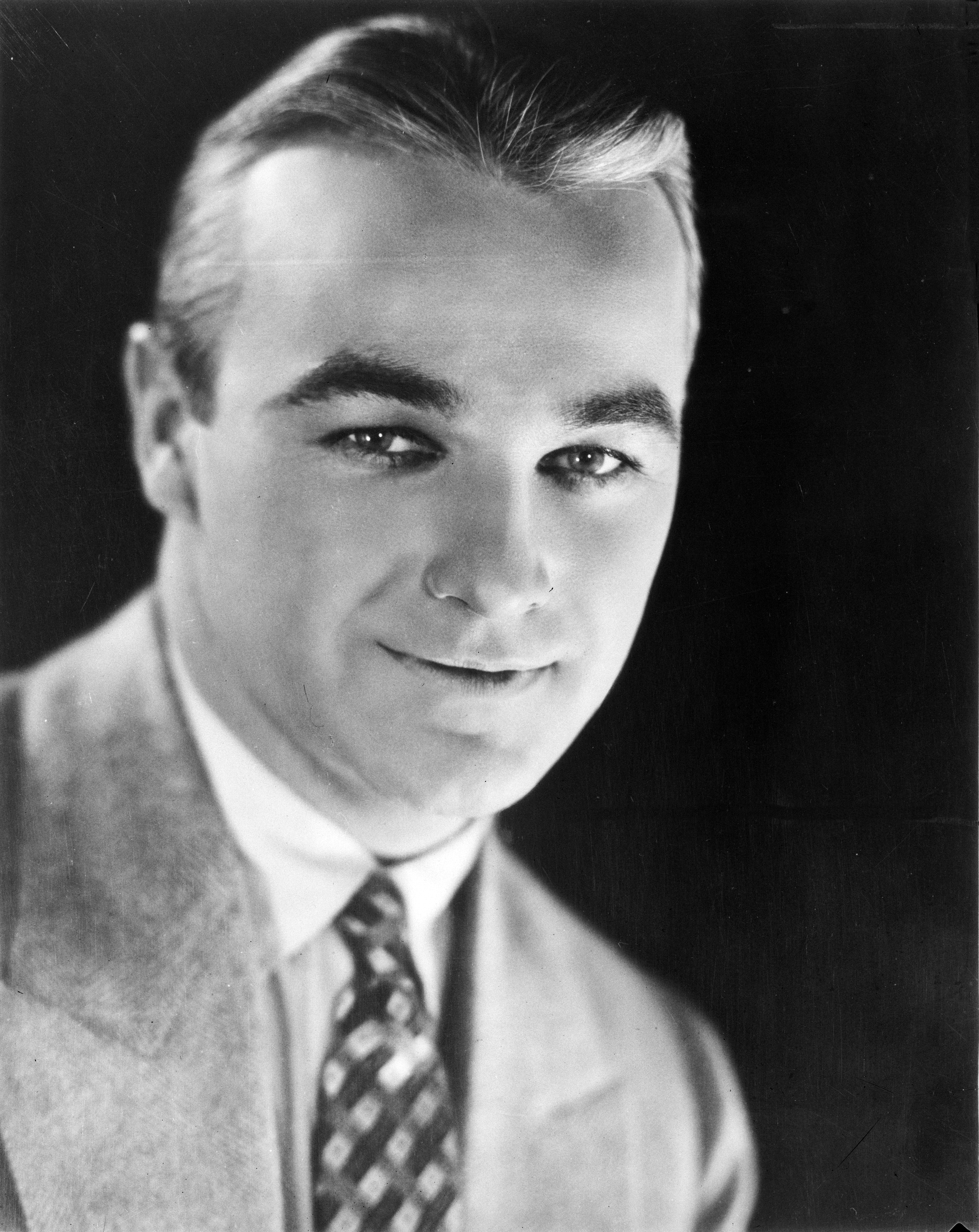
- Boyd c. 1925
- Born: June 5, 1895; Hendrysburg, Ohio, U.S.
- Died: September 12, 1972 (aged 77); Laguna Beach, California, U.S.
- Resting place: Forest Lawn Memorial Park Cemetery, Glendale, California, U.S.
- Other names: Hoppy, Hopalong Cassidy
- Occupations: Actor; film producer
- Years active: 1918–1954
- Height: 6 ft (183 cm)
- Spouses: Laura Maynard (m. 1917; div. 1921) Ruth Miller (m. 1921; div. 1924) Elinor Fair (m. 1926; div. 1929) Dorothy Sebastian (m. 1930; div. 1936) Grace Bradley (m. 1937–1972)
- Children: 1

William Lawrence Boyd (June 5, 1895 – September 12, 1972) was an American actor and film producer, known for portraying the cowboy hero Hopalong Cassidy in dozens of Western films released during the 1930s and '40s.

== Early life ==
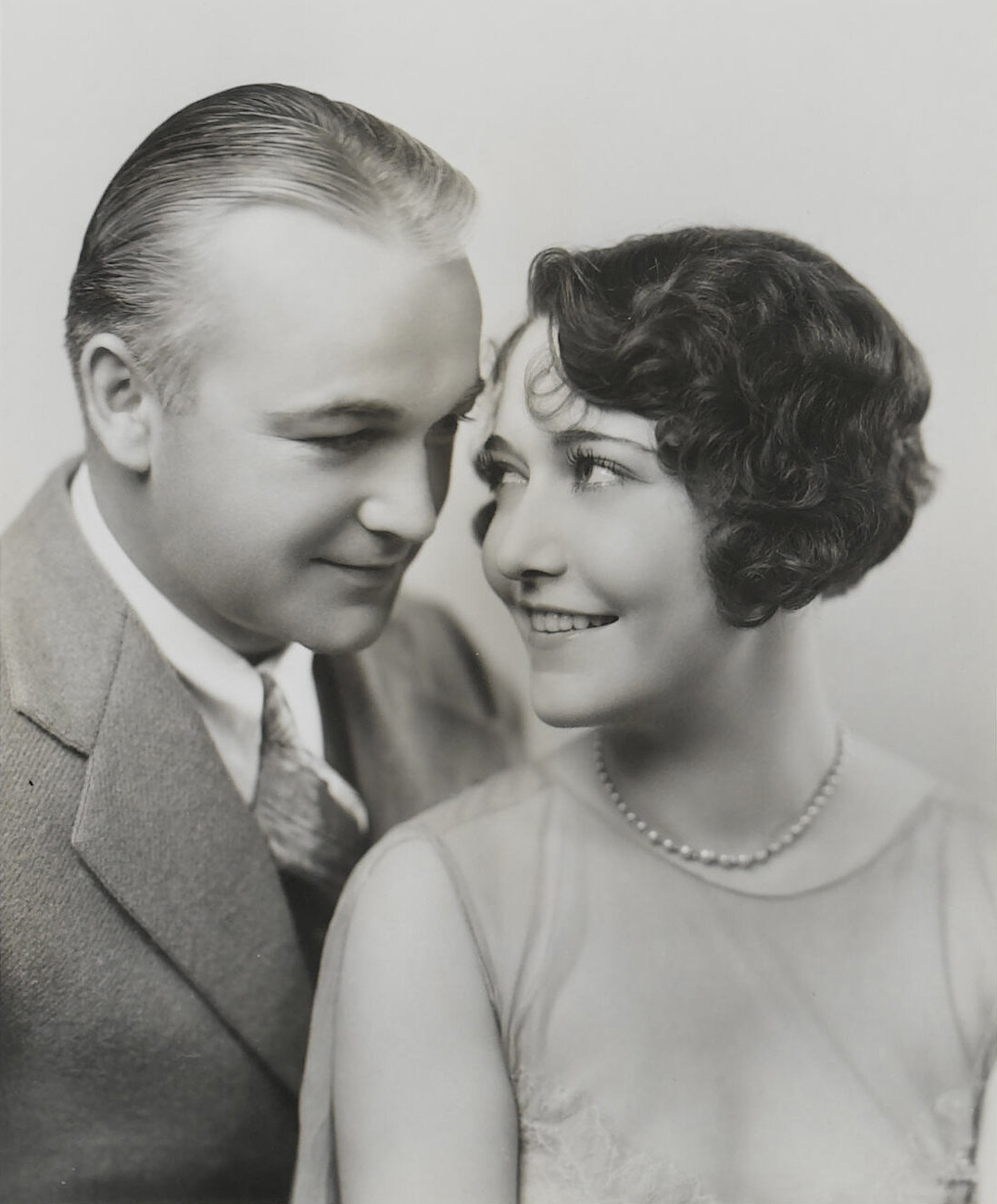
Boyd and Dorothy Sebastian in the film His First Command (1929)

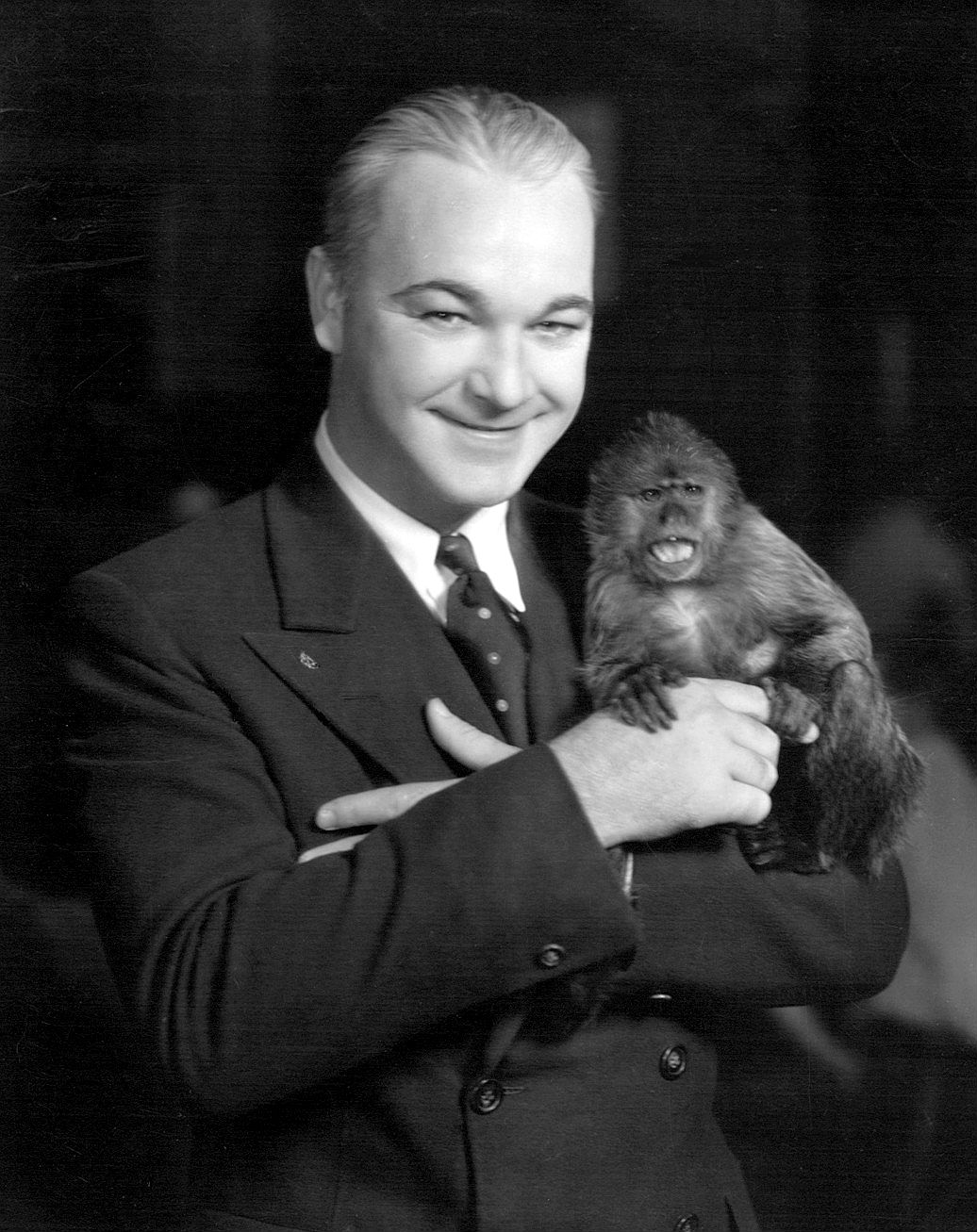
Boyd and "Miss Josephine" in 1931

Boyd in Chicago promoting a TV show (1950)

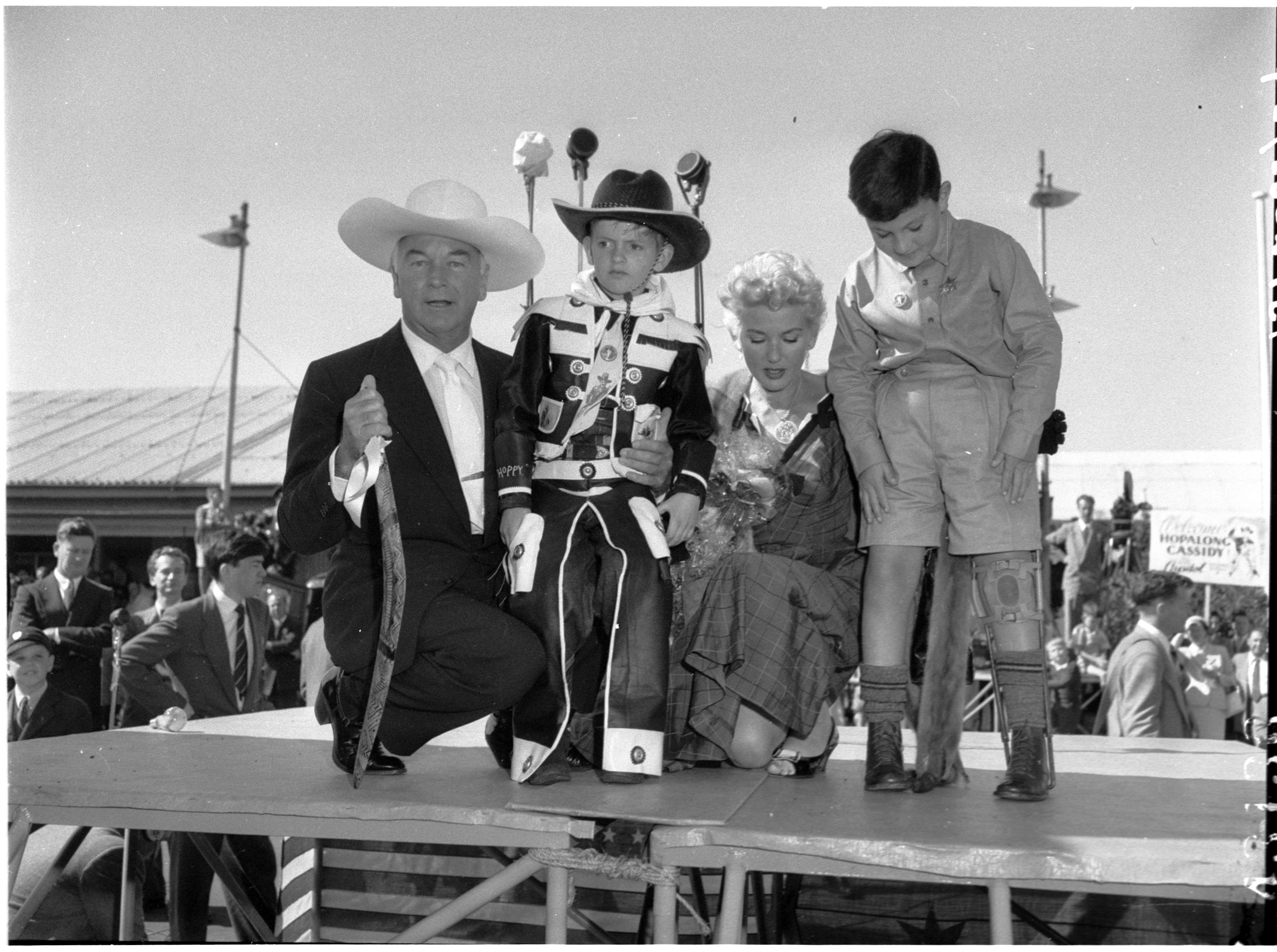
William Boyd and his wife Grace, Mascot, Sydney, 26 November 1954

Boyd was born in Hendrysburg, Ohio and reared in Cambridge, Ohio and Tulsa, Oklahoma, where he lived from 1909 to 1913. He was the son of day laborer Charles William Boyd and his wife Lida (née Wilkens). Following his father's death, Boyd moved to California and worked as an orange picker, surveyor, tool dresser and auto salesman.

== Career ==
=== Silent era and matinee idol ===
In Hollywood, Boyd found work as an extra in Why Change Your Wife? and other films. During World War I, he enlisted in the army but was exempt from military service because of a heart condition. More prominent film roles followed, including his breakout role as Jack Moreland in Cecil B. DeMille's The Road to Yesterday (1925), which earned critical praise. DeMille soon cast him as the leading man in the highly acclaimed silent drama film The Volga Boatman. another critical success, and with Boyd now firmly established as a matinee idol and romantic leading man, he began earning an annual salary of $100,000. He acted in DeMille's The King of Kings (1927) and Skyscraper (1928), as well as D.W. Griffith's Lady of the Pavements (1929).

RKO Pictures ended Boyd's contract in 1931 when his photo was mistakenly run in a newspaper story about the arrest of another actor, William "Stage" Boyd, on gambling and liquor charges. Although the newspaper apologized, explaining the mistake in the following day's newspaper, Boyd said, "The damage was already done." Boyd was virtually destitute and without a job, and for several years, he was credited in films as Bill Boyd to prevent being mistaken for the other William Boyd.

=== Hopalong Cassidy ===
In 1935, Boyd was offered the supporting role of Red Connors in the movie Hop-Along Cassidy, but he asked to be considered for the title role and won it. The original character of Hopalong Cassidy, written by Clarence E. Mulford for pulp magazines, was changed from a hard-drinking, rough-living, redheaded wrangler to a cowboy hero who did not smoke, swear or drink alcohol (he drank sarsaparilla) and who would allow the villain to start fights. Although Boyd "never branded a cow or mended a fence, cannot bulldog a steer" and disliked Western music, he became indelibly associated with the Hopalong character and, as with the cowboy stars Roy Rogers and Gene Autry, gained lasting fame in the Western film genre.

The films were typically more polished and impressive than were the usual low-budget programmed Westerns, with superior outdoor photography and recognizable supporting players familiar from major Hollywood films. Big-city theaters, many of which usually would not normally rent Westerns, noticed the high quality of the productions and permitted the series more exposure than they did for other Westerns. Paramount Pictures released the films through 1941 and United Artists produced them from 1943.

Producer Harry "Pop" Sherman wanted to create more ambitious epics and abandoned the Hopalong Cassidy franchise. Boyd, determined to keep the series alive, produced the last 12 Cassidy features himself on noticeably lower budgets. By this time, interest in the character had waned, and with far fewer theaters still showing the films, the series ended in 1948.

Boyd insisted on purchasing the rights to all of the Hopalong Cassidy films. Sherman no longer cared about the property, as he believed that Boyd's appeal, as well as that of his films, had waned. Boyd sold or mortgaged almost all of his possessions to meet Sherman's price of $350,000 for the rights and the film catalog.

=== Hoppy rides again ===
In 1948 Boyd, then regarded as a cowboy star of the past with his fortunes at their lowest, brought a print of one of his older films to the local NBC television station and offered it at a nominal rental, hoping for new exposure. The film was received so well that NBC asked for more, and within months Boyd released the entire library. The films became very popular and began the long-running genre of Westerns on television. Boyd's desperate gamble made him one of the first national television stars and restored his fortune. As did Rogers and Autry, Boyd licensed merchandise, including products such as Hopalong Cassidy watches, trash cans, cups, dishes, Topps trading cards, a comic strip, comic books, cowboy outfits, home-movie digests of his Paramount releases via Castle Films and a new Hopalong Cassidy radio show that ran from 1948 to 1952.

Boyd identified with his character, often dressing as a cowboy in public. He was concerned about children and refused to license his name for products that he considered unsuitable or dangerous, and he declined personal appearances at which children would be charged admission.

Boyd appeared as Hopalong Cassidy on the cover of numerous national magazines, including Look (August 29, 1950) and Time (November 27, 1950). For Thanksgiving in 1950, he led the Carolinas' Carrousel Parade in Charlotte, North Carolina, which attracted an estimated crowd of 500,000, the largest in the parade's history.

Boyd had a cameo role as himself in Cecil B. DeMille's 1952 circus epic The Greatest Show on Earth. DeMille reportedly asked Boyd to take the role of Moses in his remake of The Ten Commandments, but Boyd felt that his identification with the Cassidy character would make it impossible for audiences to accept him as Moses.

== Personal life ==
Boyd was married five times, first to wealthy Massachusetts heiress Laura Maynes, then to the actresses Ruth Miller, Elinor Fair, Dorothy Sebastian and Grace Bradley. His only son, William Wallace Boyd, whose mother was Miller, died of pertussis (whooping cough) at the age of nine months. After his retirement from the screen, Boyd invested time and money in real estate and moved to Palm Desert, California. He refused interviews and photographs in later years in order to not taint his memory as a screen idol.

For his contributions to the film industry, Boyd has a motion-picture star on the Hollywood Walk of Fame at 1734 Vine Street. In 1995, he was inducted into the Western Performers Hall of Fame at the National Cowboy & Western Heritage Museum in Oklahoma City.

=== Death ===
In 1972, Boyd died from complications related to Parkinson's disease and congestive heart failure. He was survived by his fifth wife, Grace Bradley Boyd, who died in 2010. He is buried at the Sanctuary of Guiding Love alcove in the Great Mausoleum at Forest Lawn Memorial Park (Glendale).

== Selected filmography ==
- Old Wives for New (1918) – Minor Role (uncredited)
- Was He Guilty? (1919) – (uncredited)
- The Six Best Cellars (1920) – Holsappel (uncredited)
- Why Change Your Wife? (1920) – Naval Officer at Hotel (uncredited)
- The City of Masks (1920) – Carpenter
- Something to Think About (1920) – (uncredited)
- A City Sparrow (1920) – Hughie Ray
- The Life of the Party (1920) – One of Leary's Office Staff (uncredited)
- The Jucklins (1921) – Dan Stuart
- Paying the Piper (1921) – (uncredited)
- Forbidden Fruit (1921) – Billiards Player (uncredited)
- Brewster's Millions (1921) – Harrison
- A Wise Fool (1921) – Gerard Fynes
- Moonlight and Honeysuckle (1921) – Robert V. Courtney
- The Affairs of Anatol (1921) – Guest (uncredited)
- After the Show (1921) – (uncredited)
- Exit the Vamp (1921) – Robert Pitts
- Fool's Paradise (1921) – (uncredited)
- Saturday Night (1922) – Party Guest (uncredited)
- Moran of the Lady Letty (1922) – Ramon's Friend at Homecoming (uncredited)
- Bobbed Hair (1922) – Dick Barton
- Nice People (1922) – Oliver Comstock
- On the High Seas (1922) – Dick Deveraux
- Manslaughter (1922) – (uncredited)
- The Young Rajah (1922) – Stephen Van Kovert
- Michael O'Halloran (1923) – Douglas Bruce
- Hollywood (1923) – Himself
- Adam's Rib (1923) – Party Guest (uncredited)
- The Temple of Venus (1923) – Stanley Dale
- Enemies of Children (1923)
- Triumph (1924) – Minor Role (uncredited)
- Changing Husbands (1924) – Conrad Bradshaw
- Tarnish (1924) – Bill
- Feet of Clay (1924) – Young Society Man (uncredited)
- Forty Winks (1925) – Lt. Gerald Hugh Butterworth
- The Midshipman (1925) – Spud
- The Road to Yesterday (1925) – Jack Moreland
- Steel Preferred (1925) – Wally Gay
- The Volga Boatman (1926) – Feodor
- Eve's Leaves (1926) – Bill Stanley
- The Last Frontier (1926) – Tom Kirby
- Her Man o' War (1926) – Jim Sanderson
- Jim, the Conqueror (1926) – Jim Burgess
- Wolves of the Air (1927) – Jerry Tanner
- The Yankee Clipper (1927) – Captain Hal Winslow
- The King of Kings (1927) – Simon of Cyrene
- Two Arabian Knights (1927) – W. Daingerfield Phelps III
- Dress Parade (1927) – Vic Donovan
- The Night Flyer (1928) – Jim Bradley
- Skyscraper (1928) – Blondy
- The Cop (1928) – Pete Smith
- Power (1928) – Husky
- Lady of the Pavements (1929) – Count Karl Von Arnim
- The Leatherneck (1929) – William Calhoun
- The Flying Fool (1929) – Bill Taylor
- High Voltage (1929) – Bill
- His First Command (1929) – Terry Culver
- Officer O'Brien (1930) – Bill O'Brien
- The Painted Desert (1931) – Bill Holbrook
- Beyond Victory (1931) – Sergeant Bill Thatcher
- The Big Gamble (1931) – Alan Beckwith
- Suicide Fleet (1932) – Baltimore Clark
- Carnival Boat (1932) – Buck Gannon
- Men of America (1932) – Jim Parker
- Flaming Gold (1933) – Dan Manton
- Lucky Devils (1933) – Skipper Clark
- Emergency Call (1933) – Joe Bradley
- Cheaters (1934) – Steve Morris
- Port of Lost Dreams (1934) – Lars Christensen
- Hop–Along Cassidy (1935) – Bill Hopalong Cassidy
- The Eagle's Brood (1935) – Bill Hopalong Cassidy
- Racing Luck (1935) – Dan Morgan
- Bar 20 Rides Again (1935) – Hopalong Cassidy
- Heart of the West (1936) – Hopalong Cassidy
- Call of the Prairie (1936) – Hopalong Cassidy
- Three on the Trail (1936) – Hopalong Cassidy
- Federal Agent (1936) – Bob Woods
- Burning Gold (1936) – Jim Thornton
- Go–Get–'Em–Haines (1936) – Steve Haines
- Hopalong Cassidy Returns (1936) – Hopalong Cassidy
- Trail Dust (1936) – Hopalong Cassidy
- Borderland (1937) – Hopalong Cassidy
- Hills of Old Wyoming (1937) – Hopalong Cassidy
- North of the Rio Grande (1937) – Hopalong Cassidy
- Rustlers' Valley (1937) – Hopalong Cassidy
- Hopalong Rides Again (1937) – Hopalong Cassidy
- Texas Trail (1937) – Hopalong Cassidy
- Partners of the Plains (1938) – Hopalong Cassidy
- Cassidy of Bar 20 (1938) – Hopalong Cassidy
- Heart of Arizona (1938) – Hopalong Cassidy
- Bar 20 Justice (1938) – Hopalong Cassidy
- Pride of the West (1938) – Hopalong Cassidy
- Sunset Trail (1938) – Hopalong Cassidy
- In Old Mexico (1938) – Hopalong Cassidy
- The Frontiersmen (1938) – Hopalong Cassidy
- Silver on the Sage (1939) – Hopalong Cassidy
- Renegade Trail (1939) – Hopalong Cassidy
- Range War (1939) – Hopalong Cassidy
- Law of the Pampas (1939) – Hopalong Cassidy
- Santa Fe Marshal (1940) – Hopalong Cassidy
- The Showdown (1940) – Hopalong Cassidy
- Hidden Gold (1940) – Hopalong Cassidy
- Stagecoach War (1940) – Hopalong Cassidy
- Three Men from Texas (1940) – Hopalong Cassidy
- Doomed Caravan (1941) – Hopalong Cassidy
- In Old Colorado (1941) – Hopalong Cassidy
- Border Vigilantes (1941) – Hopalong Cassidy
- Pirates on Horseback (1941) – Hopalong Cassidy
- Wide Open Town (1941) – Hopalong Cassidy
- Stick to Your Guns (1941) – Hopalong Cassidy
- Riders of the Timberline (1941) – Hopalong Cassidy
- Twilight on the Trail (1941) – Hopalong Cassidy
- Outlaws of the Desert (1941) – Hopalong Cassidy
- Secrets of the Wasteland (1941) – Hopalong Cassidy
- Undercover Man (1942) – Hopalong Cassidy
- Lost Canyon (1942) – Hopalong Cassidy
- Hoppy Serves a Writ (1943) – Hopalong Cassidy
- Border Patrol (1943) – Hopalong Cassidy
- Leather Burners (1943) – Hopalong Cassidy
- Colt Comrades (1943) – Hopalong Cassidy
- Bar 20 (1943) – Hopalong Cassidy
- False Colors (1943) – Hopalong Cassidy
- Riders of the Deadline (1943) – Hopalong Cassidy
- Lumberjack (1944) – Hopalong Cassidy
- Mystery Man (1944) – Hopalong Cassidy
- Texas Masquerade (1944) - Hopalong Cassidy
- Forty Thieves (1944) – Hopalong Cassidy
- The Devil's Playground (1946) – Hopalong Cassidy
- Fool's Gold (1946) – Hopalong Cassidy
- Unexpected Guest (1947) – Hopalong Cassidy
- Dangerous Venture (1947) – Hopalong Cassidy
- The Marauders (1947) – Hopalong Cassidy
- Hoppy's Holiday (1947) – Hopalong Cassidy
- Silent Conflict (1948) – Hopalong Cassidy
- The Dead Don't Dream (1948) – Hopalong Cassidy
- Sinister Journey (1948) – Hopalong Cassidy
- Borrowed Trouble (1948) – Hopalong Cassidy
- False Paradise (1948) – Hopalong Cassidy
- Strange Gamble (1948) – Hopalong Cassidy
- The Greatest Show on Earth (1952) – Hopalong Cassidy (uncredited)
- Little Smokey: The True Story of America's Forest Fire Preventin' Bear (1953, Short) – Hopalong Cassidy (narrator)
- Hopalong Cassidy (1949–1952, TV Series) – Hopalong Cassidy
