= Lewis J. Rachmil =

American film producer

- Born: July 3, 1908; New York City
- Died: February 19, 1984 (aged 75); Beverly Hills, California
- Occupations: Film producer, art director
- Years active: 1933–1984

Lewis J. Rachmil (July 3, 1908 – February 19, 1984) was an American film producer and art director. He was nominated for an Academy Award in the category of Best Art Direction for the film Our Town. In the mid and late 1940s, he produced several of William Boyd's popular Hopalong Cassidy B-Westerns. In 1959, he was producer of Men into Space, a one-season CBS TV series that tried to give a serious science fiction preview of where the then-new American space program seemed to be heading. During the 1960s he produced several films in England for Mirisch Films.

He was born in New York City and died in Beverly Hills, California.

== Selected filmography ==
- Carnival Lady (1933)
- Our Town (1940)
- Hunt the Man Down (1950)
- Gun Fury (1953)
- The Violent Men (1955)
- Over-Exposed (1956)
- Reprisal! (1956)
- Gidget (1959)
- Kings of the Sun (1963)
- 633 Squadron (1964)
- Inspector Clouseau (1968)
- Footloose (1984)
