= Fred W. Berger =

American film editor

- Born: July 9, 1908; New York, U.S.
- Died: May 23, 2003 (aged 94); Westwood, California, U.S.
- Education: University of Michigan
- Occupation: Film editor
- Spouse: Frances Berger
- Children: 2; including Peter E. Berger

Fred W. Berger (July 9, 1908 – May 23, 2003) was an American film editor. He was nominated for an Academy Award in the category Best Film Editing for the film The Hot Rock. He also won a Primetime Emmy Award and was nominated for seven more in the category Outstanding Picture Editing for his work on the television programs M*A*S*H and Dallas.

Berger died on May 23, 2003 of natural causes at his home in Westwood, California, at the age of 94.

== Selected filmography ==
- The Hot Rock (1972; co-nominated with Frank P. Keller)
