= Hopalong Cassidy =

Fictional cowboy hero

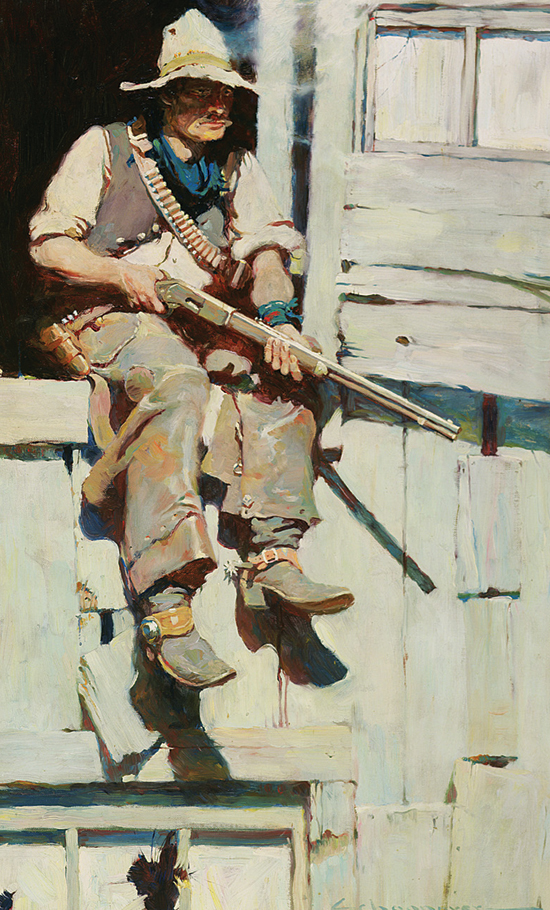
- Hopalong Takes Command, illustration by Frank Schoonover for the 1905 story "The Fight at Buckskin"
- First appearance: Bar-20
- Last appearance: Hopalong Cassidy Serves a Writ
- Created by: Clarence E. Mulford
- Portrayed by: William Boyd

In-universe information
- Gender: Male
- Occupation: Cowboy
- Nationality: American

Hopalong Cassidy is a fictional cowboy hero created in 1904 by the author Clarence E. Mulford, who wrote a series of short stories and novels based on the character. Mulford portrayed the character as rude, dangerous, and rough-talking. Shot in the leg during a gun fight, he walked with a limp that gave him his nickname.

From the 1930s to the 1950s, the character became indelibly associated with actor William Boyd, who portrayed Cassidy first in a series of sixty-six films from 1935 to 1948, then in children-oriented radio and TV series, both of which lasted until 1952. Boyd's portrayal of Cassidy had little in common with the literary character, being instead a clean-cut, sarsaparilla-drinking hero who never shot first. The plots of the film, radio and TV series were generally not taken from Mulford's writings.

At the peak of the character's popularity in the early 1950s, he spawned enormous amounts of merchandise, as well as a comic strip, additional novels by Louis L'Amour (writing as Tex Burns), and even a short-lived amusement park, "Hoppyland", in Venice, Los Angeles.

== In literature ==
Clarence E. Mulford wrote the first Hopalong Cassidy short story in 1904 while living in Fryeburg, Maine. He wrote the first novel, Bar-20 (named after Cassidy's ranch) in 1906. He wrote 28 Hopalong Cassidy novels in all, with the last one, Hopalong Cassidy Serves a Writ, being published in 1941. Not all of these novels focused on the Cassidy character; some focused on other characters in and around Bar-20.

In 1950, while the character was undergoing a surge in popularity, then-aspiring author Louis L'Amour was commissioned to write four additional Hopalong Cassidy novels, this time with a characterization matching William Boyd's portrayal, rather than Mulford's writings. L'Amour wrote the novels under the pseudonym Tex Burns. Although they were his first published novels, he was unhappy with the assignment, since he preferred the original character, and publicly denied authorship of the novels for the rest of his life.

In 2005, author Susie Coffman published Follow Your Stars, new stories starring the character. In three of these stories, Coffman wrote the wife of actor William Boyd into the stories.

== Film history ==
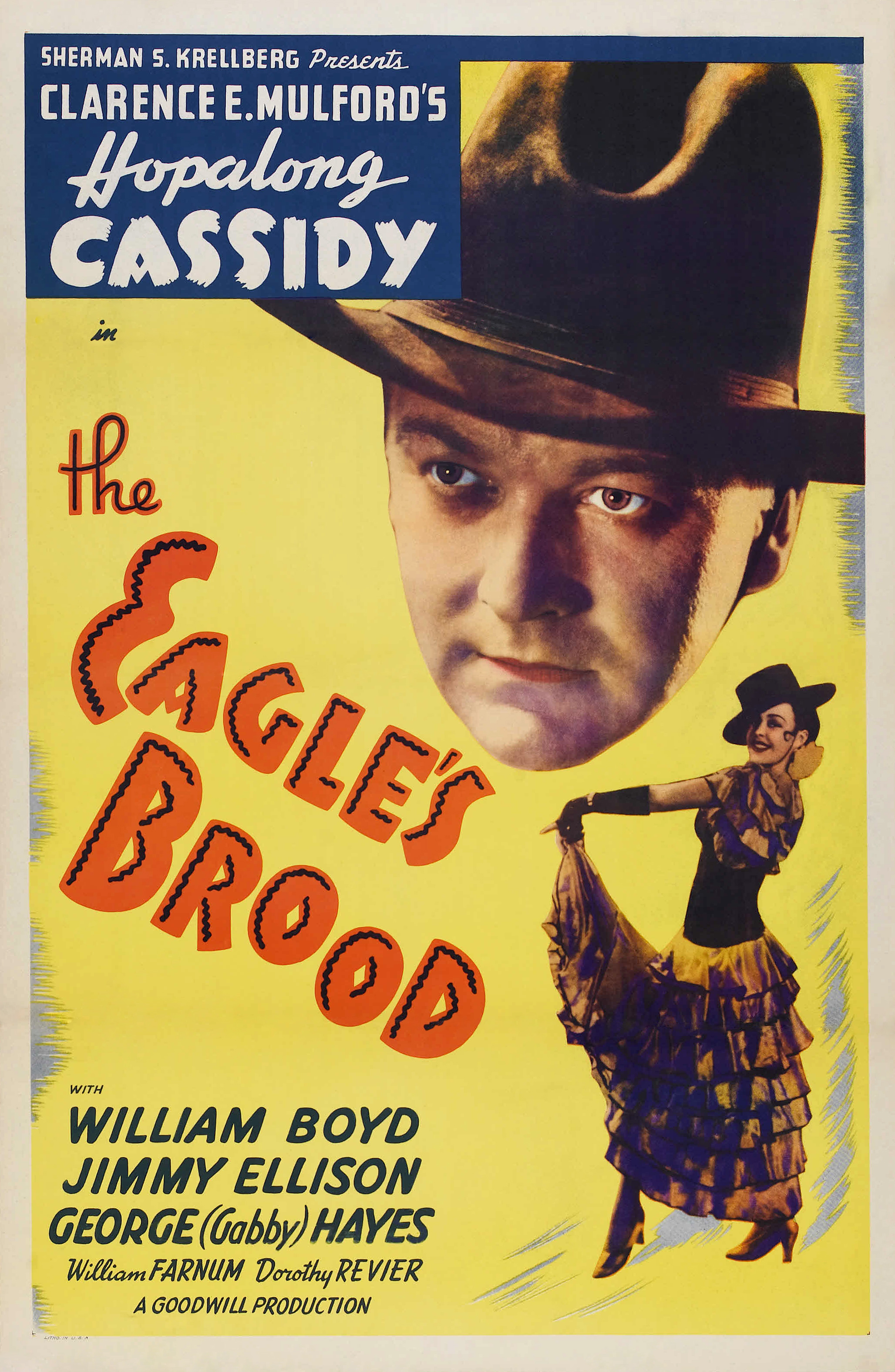
Reissue poster for the 1935 Hopalong Cassidy film The Eagle's Brood

In the first film, Hopalong Cassidy (then spelled "Hop-along") got his name after being shot in the leg. Hopalong's "drink of choice" was the nonalcoholic sarsaparilla. As portrayed on the screen, white-haired Bill "Hopalong" Cassidy was usually clad strikingly in black (including his hat, an exception to the Western film stereotype that only villains wore black hats). He was reserved and well spoken, with a sense of fair play. He was often called upon to intercede when dishonest characters took advantage of honest citizens. "Hoppy" and his white horse, Topper, usually traveled through the West with two companions: one young and trouble-prone with a weakness for damsels in distress, the other older, comically awkward and outspoken.

The juvenile lead was successively played by James Ellison, Russell Hayden, George Reeves, Rand Brooks, and Jimmy Rogers. George Hayes (later to become known as "Gabby" Hayes) originally played Cassidy's grizzled sidekick, Windy Halliday. After Hayes left the series because of a salary dispute with producer Harry Sherman (and personal differences with Boyd, according to Russell Hayden) he was replaced by the comedian Britt Wood as Speedy McGinnis and finally by the veteran movie comedian Andy Clyde as California Carlson. Clyde, the most durable of the sidekicks, remained with the series until it ended. A few actors of future prominence appeared in Cassidy films, notably Robert Mitchum, who appeared in seven films at the beginning of his career.

Fifty-four Hopalong Cassidy pictures were produced independently by Harry Sherman. He released them through Paramount Pictures through 1941, and then United Artists. The films were noted for fast action and superior outdoor photography (usually by Russell Harlan). Sherman wanted to make more ambitious films and tried to cancel the Cassidy series, but popular demand forced Sherman back into production. Sherman gave up the series in 1944 but Boyd revived it, producing 12 more films himself.

== Television ==
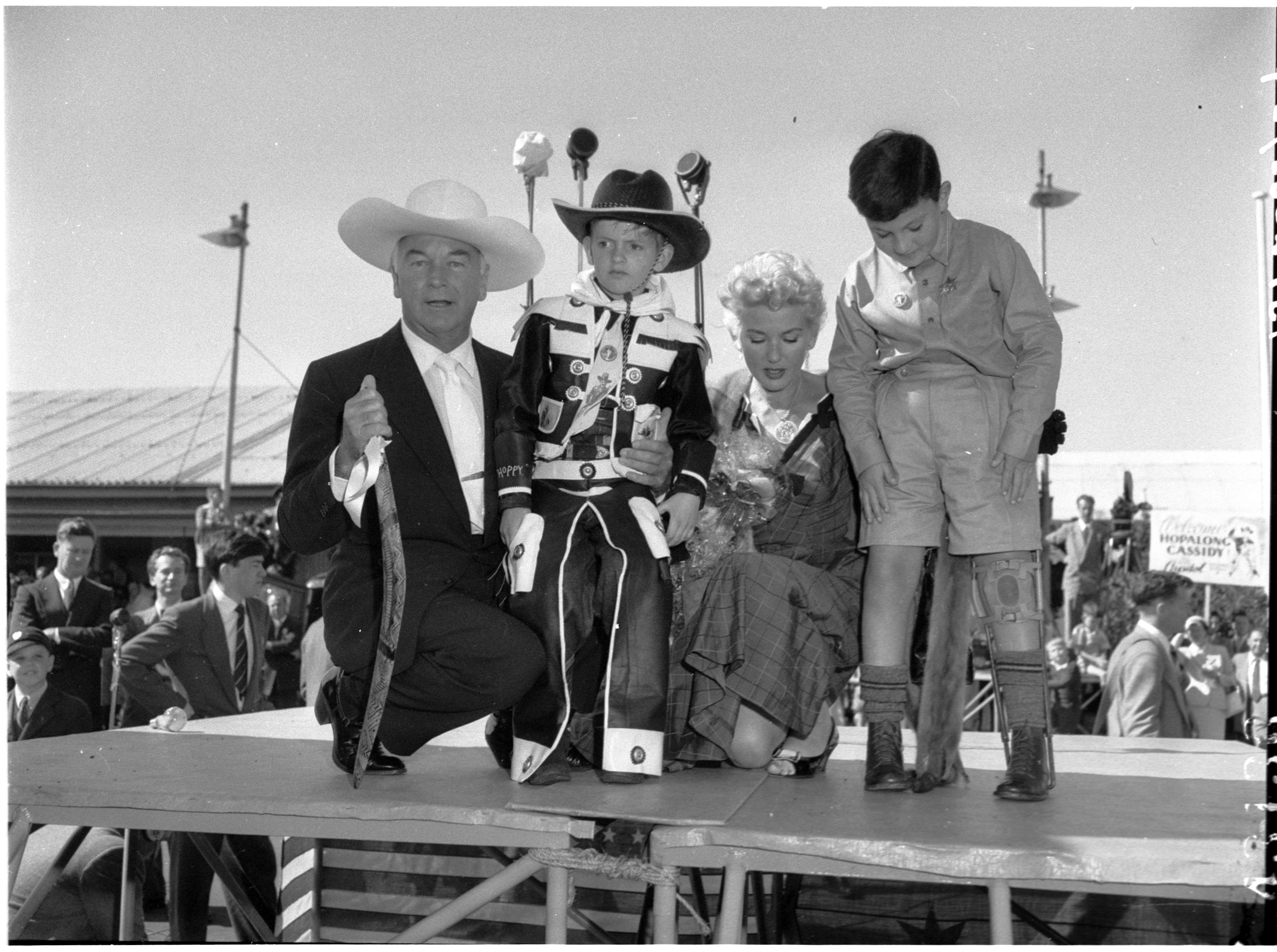
Actor William Boyd and his wife Grace, in Australia promoting Hopalong Cassidy, 1954

By the late 1940s, the Hopalong Cassidy movie series was on its last legs. Harry Sherman had already withdrawn from the franchise, and only Boyd was interested in keeping it going. Boyd thought Hopalong Cassidy might have a future in television, but author Mulford had already reserved the television rights in 1935, as part of his deal with Paramount. Boyd sold or mortgaged most of what he owned to buy the TV rights from Mulford and the backlog of movies from Sherman, spending $350,000 to control the films exclusively. As historian James Horwitz wryly observed, "Sherman and Paramount didn't seem to care if they never saw another reel of Hopalong Cassidy film. And as far as the world cared, [Boyd] was welcome to them. The folks in Hollywood who thought they were so smart thought Boyd was a bit tetched in the head, certainly in the grip of an unhealthy obsession, as he went about gathering up all the rights and all the negatives of every Hopalong Cassidy film ever made. Was he planning to spend the rest of his days projecting his old films for himself? Or was he on to something?"

In November 1948, Boyd persuaded the Los Angeles NBC television station to air one Hopalong Cassidy film for a $200 rental fee. This was when almost all TV programs ran only five, 15, or 30 minutes each, like radio shows, so a feature film on TV was a special event. The broadcast was so successful that NBC rented the entire library from Boyd and broadcast the films on its national network. NBC could not wait for a television series to be produced, and edited the feature films to broadcast length. The Cassidy films commanded a premium price; Variety noted in 1950 that the cost of a single showing of a western in Los Angeles "ranges from $80 to $250. Hopalong Cassidy films are the exception, bringing $1,000 per showing" [about $13,400 in 2025]. Boyd incorporated his own firm, U. S. Television Office, to administer the licensing of the films and their related business deals.

While the feature films were airing on NBC, Boyd wasted no time in assembling a cast and crew to produce new half-hour films for television, again for NBC. On June 24, 1949, Hopalong Cassidy became the first network Western television series, beating The Lone Ranger to the home screen by a few months. The production schedule was so rushed that co-star Andy Clyde couldn't rearrange his schedule of movie commitments (Clyde did remain with Boyd on radio and for children's records). Edgar Buchanan was the new TV sidekick, Red Connors (a character from the original stories and a few of the early films). The theme music for the television show was written by Nacio Herb Brown (music) and L. Wolfe Gilbert (lyrics). The show ranked number 7 in the 1949 Nielsen ratings, number 9 in the 1950–1951 season and number 28 in 1951–1952. The success of the show and tie-ins inspired juvenile television westerns such as The Range Rider, Tales of the Texas Rangers, Annie Oakley, The Gene Autry Show, and The Roy Rogers Show.

== Merchandising success ==
William Boyd as Cassidy was featured on the cover of national magazines such as Look, Life, and Time. Boyd profited extensively from his work as Hopalong, earning $800,000 in 1950 alone, mostly from merchandise licensing and endorsement deals. In 1950, Hopalong Cassidy was featured on the first lunchbox to bear an image, causing sales of Aladdin lunch boxes to rise from 50,000 units to 600,000 units per year. In 1950, more than 100 companies manufactured $70 million of Hopalong Cassidy products, including children's dinnerware, pillows, roller skates, soap, Timex wristwatches, and jackknives.

There was a new demand for Hopalong Cassidy features in movie theaters, and Boyd licensed reissue distributor Film Classics to make new film prints and advertising accessories. Another 1950 enterprise saw the home-movie company Castle Films manufacturing condensed versions of the Paramount films for 16mm and 8mm film projectors; they were sold through 1966.

== Radio ==
At a time when radio shows were being converted to new television series, the Hopalong Cassidy TV showings inspired a new radio series. The Mutual Broadcasting System began broadcasting a radio version, with Andy Clyde as the sidekick (except for episodes 28 to 53 of the 105-episode series, when, for reasons unknown, he was replaced by several different radio actors). The show was syndicated from 1948 to 1950, then began broadcast on Mutual on January 1, 1950. At the end of September, the show moved to CBS Radio, where it ran until 1952.

== In other media ==
=== Comic books/comic strips ===
Fawcett Comics published a Hopalong Cassidy comic book one-shot in 1943, followed by an ongoing series from 1946 to 1953 (numbered #1 through 85), when the company ceased publishing. DC Comics took over the title in 1954 with issue #86, publishing it until issue #135, in 1959.

Mirror Enterprises Syndicate distributed a Hopalong Cassidy comic strip starting in 1949; it was bought out by King Features in 1951, running until 1955. The strip was drawn by Dan Spiegle, with scripts by Royal King Cole.

=== Record readers ===
Beginning in 1950, Capitol Records released a series of Hopalong Cassidy "record readers" featuring William Boyd and Andy Clyde. These were produced by Alan W. Livingston, with music by Billy May.

== Hoppyland ==
On May 26, 1951, an amusement park named Hoppyland opened in the Venice section of Los Angeles. This was an expansion and retheming of Venice Lake Park (opened the previous year) as Boyd became an investor. Standing on 80 acres (320,000 m^{2}) it included a roller coaster, miniature railroads, pony rides, boat ride, Ferris wheel, carousel, and other thrill rides along with picnic grounds and recreational facilities. Despite Boyd's regular appearances as Hoppy at the park, it was not a success and shut down in 1954.

== Museums ==
There have been museum displays of Hopalong Cassidy. The major display is at the Autry National Center at Griffith Park in Los Angeles, California. Fifteen miles east of Wichita, Kansas, at the Prairie Rose Chuckwagon Supper was the Hopalong Cassidy Museum. The museum and its contents were auctioned on August 24, 2007, owing to the failure of its parent company, Wild West World.

A "Hoppy Museum" consisting of a collection of products endorsed by William Boyd is located at Scott's 10th Street Antique Mall in Cambridge, Ohio.

Topper's saddle is on display at Twin Cities South Trailers, a horse trailer dealership in Pilot Point Texas.

William Boyd's collection, including Hopalong's TV production materials, is archived at the American Heritage Center at the University of Wyoming.

== Cultural references ==
In the closing chapter of F. Scott Fitzgerald's 1925 novel The Great Gatsby, the title character's father, Henry C. Gatz, explaining his son's early character, is described "...pull[ing] from his pocket a ragged old copy of a book called Hopalong Cassidy. 'Look here, this is a book he had when he was a boy. It just shows you.'"

The 1951 song "It's Beginning to Look a Lot Like Christmas" includes a reference to "Hopalong boots" as a holiday gift desired by children.

The Hopalong Cassidy craze inspired at least four theatrical films, all produced in 1951: the comedy Callaway Went Thataway; the burlesque Skipalong Rosenbloom with Maxie Rosenbloom as the unlikely hero; the Joe McDoakes short So You Want to Be a Cowboy; and the Warner Bros. cartoon Gift Wrapped (filmed in 1951; released in March 1952).

In the 1951 film An American in Paris, during the singing of "I Got Rhythm," a French boy shouts out the name "Hopalong Cassidy" after Gene Kelly pretends to be a cowboy.

Heisman Trophy winner and NFL halfback Howard Cassady was known as Hopalong Cassady since 1952, his freshman year at Ohio State University.

Hopalong Cassidy is also referenced in Buddy Alan and Don Rich's 1970 top-twenty hit, "Cowboy Convention". In 1973, fellow film cowboy Roy Rogers released a nostalgic ballad called "Hoppy, Gene and Me".

In the 1985 film Fletch, the eponymous character, played by Chevy Chase, jokes that he was close to buying a house until he learned that Hopalong Cassidy had killed himself there.

In the 1988 film Colors, a street gang member, when asked by protagonist officer Bob Hodges (Robert Duvall) what rag he is wearing from his trousers, answers “Oh, this here is my Hopalong Cassidy rag”.

In 2009, the United States Postal Service featured Cassidy as part of a series of stamps depicting early TV characters.
