= Robert Mitchum filmography =

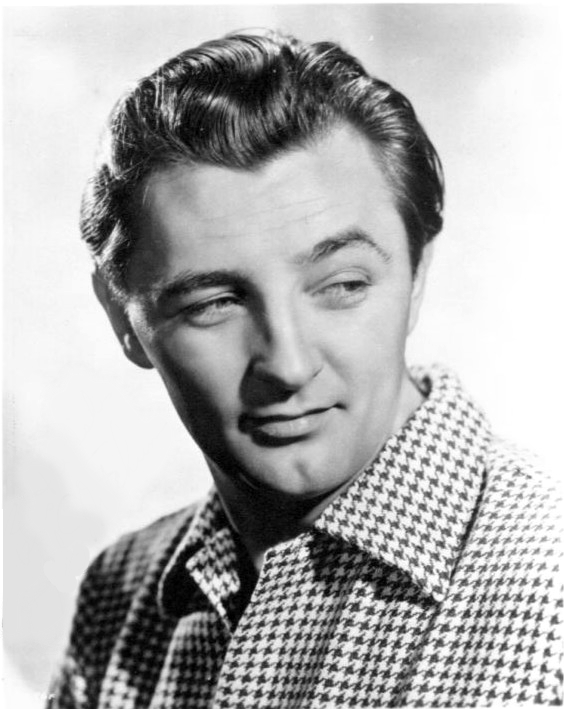
In July 1949

Robert Mitchum (1917–1997) was an American actor who appeared in over 110 films and television series over the course of his career. He is ranked 23rd on the American Film Institute's list of the 50 greatest American screen legends of all time. His first credited named role was as Quinn in the 1943 western Border Patrol. That same year he appeared in the films Follow the Band, Beyond the Last Frontier, Cry 'Havoc' and Gung Ho! as well as several Hopalong Cassidy films including Colt Comrades, Bar 20, False Colors, and Riders of the Deadline. In 1944, he starred in the western Nevada as Jim "Nevada" Lacy, and a year later in the film West of the Pecos as Pecos Smith. During the 1940s, he was also cast in the film noirs Undercurrent (1946), Crossfire (1947), Out of the Past (1947) and The Big Steal (1949). Mitchum was nominated for the Academy Award for Best Supporting Actor for his role as a world-weary soldier in the 1945 film The Story of G.I. Joe, which received critical acclaim and was a commercial success.

He co-starred in films with several Golden Age actresses such as Jane Russell in His Kind of Woman (1951), Marilyn Monroe in River of No Return (1954), and Rita Hayworth in Fire Down Below (1957). He also played numerous military roles such as playing Corporal Allison, USMC in Heaven Knows, Mr. Allison (1957), Brigadier General Norman Cota in The Longest Day (1962), Lieutenant Colonel Barney Adams in Man in the Middle (1963), and Admiral William F. Halsey in Midway (1976). Mitchum portrayed serial killer Reverend Harry Powell in The Night of the Hunter (1955), and convicted rapist Max Cady in the neo-noir psychological thriller Cape Fear (1962). Both roles are listed in the AFI's 50 Greatest Screen Villains.

Mitchum departed from his typical screen persona with his critically acclaimed performance as a mild-mannered schoolmaster in David Lean's epic drama, Ryan's Daughter (1970). While the film won two Academy Awards, Mitchum, who was thought to be a contender for a Best Actor nomination, was not nominated. After the success of Ryan's Daughter, Mitchum appeared in crime dramas including The Friends of Eddie Coyle (1973), and Farewell, My Lovely (1975). His later film roles between 1980 and 1997 included Nightkill (1980), That Championship Season (1982), Mr. North (1988), Scrooged (1988), and Waiting for Sunset (1995). He was also the narrator for the 1993 western Tombstone.

His television work included playing Victor "Pug" Henry in the mini-series The Winds of War (1983) and again in War and Remembrance (1988). When The Winds of War aired, it was the most watched miniseries at its time. He was also in the 1985 miniseries North and South with Patrick Swayze and the 1989 miniseries Brotherhood of the Rose with Connie Sellecca. He had a recurring role in the TV series A Family for Joe (1990) and African Skies (1992).

== Film ==
=== 1940s ===
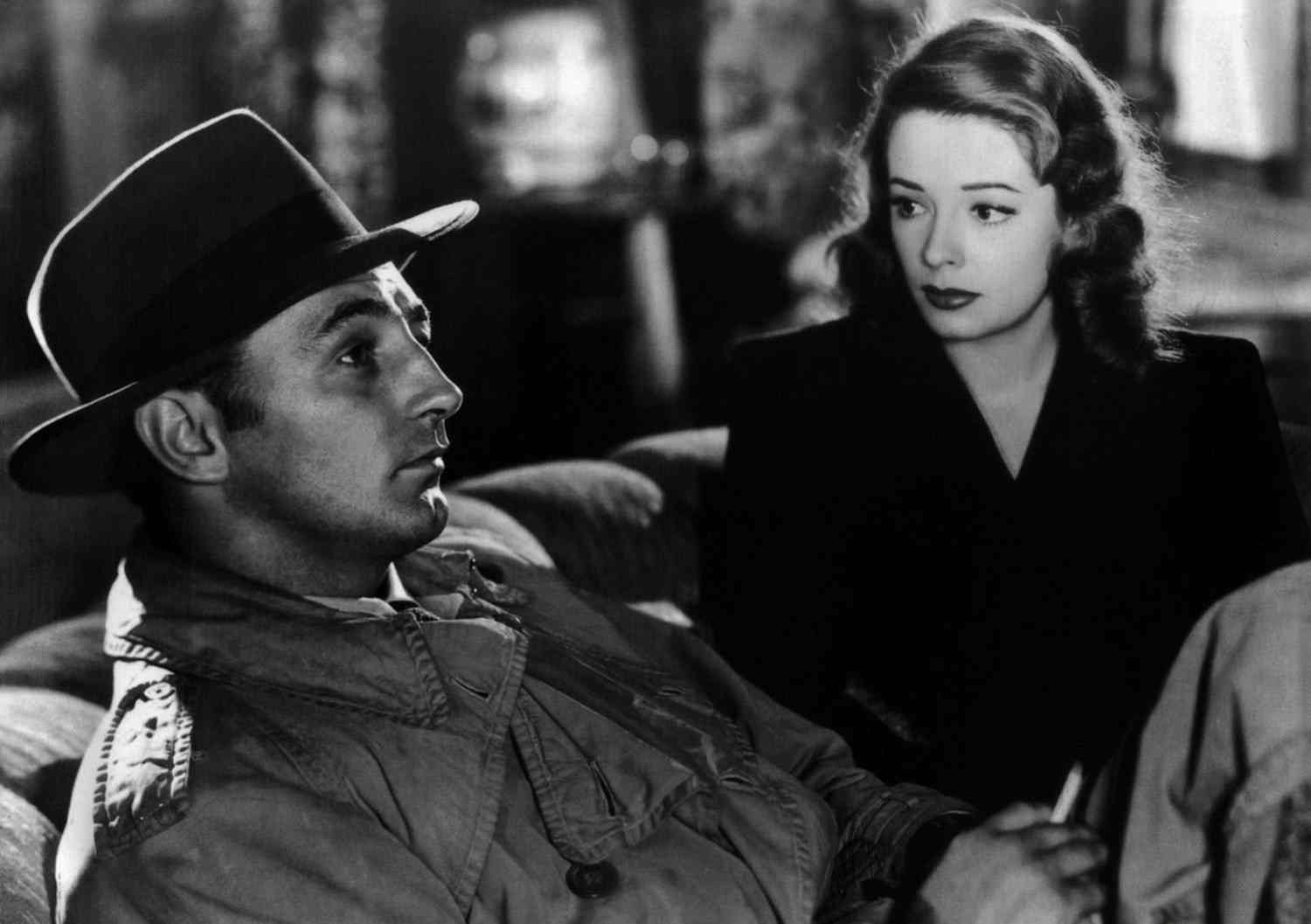
With Jane Greer in Out of the Past (1947)

| Year | Title | Role | Notes | Ref. |
|---|---|---|---|---|
| 1942 | The Magic of Make-up | Model | Short film | |
| 1943 | The Human Comedy | Quentin "Horse" Gilford | Uncredited | |
| 1943 | Hoppy Serves a Writ | Rigney | Credited as Bob Mitchum | |
| 1943 | Aerial Gunner | Sgt. Benson | Uncredited | |
| 1943 | Border Patrol | Quinn | Credited as Bob Mitchum | |
| 1943 | Follow the Band | Tate Winters | Credited as Bob Mitchum | |
| 1943 | The Leather Burners | Henchman Randall | Uncredited | |
| 1943 | Colt Comrades | Dirk Mason | Credited as Bob Mitchum | |
| 1943 | We've Never Been Licked | Panhandle Mitchell | Credited as Bob Mitchum | |
| 1943 | The Lone Star Trail | Ben Slocum | Credited as Bob Mitchum | |
| 1943 | Beyond the Last Frontier | Trigger Dolan | Credited as Bob Mitchum | |
| 1943 | Corvette K-225 | Sheppard | Uncredited | |
| 1943 | Bar 20 | Richard Adams | Credited as Bob Mitchum | |
| 1943 | Doughboys in Ireland | Ernie Jones | Credited as Bob Mitchum | |
| 1943 | False Colors | Rip Austin | Credited as Bob Mitchum | |
| 1943 | Minesweeper | Seaman Chuck Ryan | Uncredited | |
| 1943 | The Dancing Masters | Mickey Halligan | Uncredited | |
| 1943 | Cry 'Havoc' | Dying Soldier – 'I'm All Right' | Uncredited | |
| 1943 | Riders of the Deadline | Nick Drago | | |
| 1943 | Gung Ho! | "Pig-Iron" Matthews | | |
| 1944 | Johnny Doesn't Live Here Anymore | CPO Jeff Daniels | | |
| 1944 | Mr. Winkle Goes to War | Corporal | Uncredited | |
| 1944 | When Strangers Marry | Fred Graham | Credited as Bob Mitchum | |
| 1944 | Girl Rush | Jimmy Smith | Credited as Bob Mitchum | |
| 1944 | Thirty Seconds Over Tokyo | Bob Gray | | |
| 1944 | Nevada | Jim "Nevada" Lacy | Credited as Bob Mitchum; First leading role | |
| 1945 | The Story of G.I. Joe | Lt. Walker | | |
| 1945 | West of the Pecos | Pecos Smith | | |
| 1946 | Till the End of Time | William Tabeshaw | | |
| 1946 | Undercurrent | Michael Garroway | | |
| 1946 | The Locket | Norman Clyde | | |
| 1947 | Pursued | Jeb Rand | | |
| 1947 | Crossfire | Keeley | | |
| 1947 | Desire Me | Paul Aubert | | |
| 1947 | Out of the Past | Jeff | a.k.a. Build My Gallows High | |
| 1948 | Rachel and the Stranger | Jim Fairways | | |
| 1948 | Blood on the Moon | Jim Garry | | |
| 1949 | The Red Pony | Billy Buck | | |
| 1949 | The Big Steal | Lt. Duke Halliday | | |
| 1949 | Holiday Affair | Steve | | |

=== 1950s ===
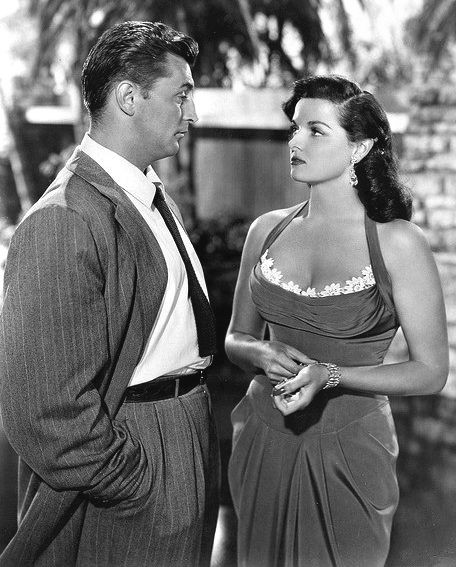
With Jane Russell in His Kind of Woman (1951)

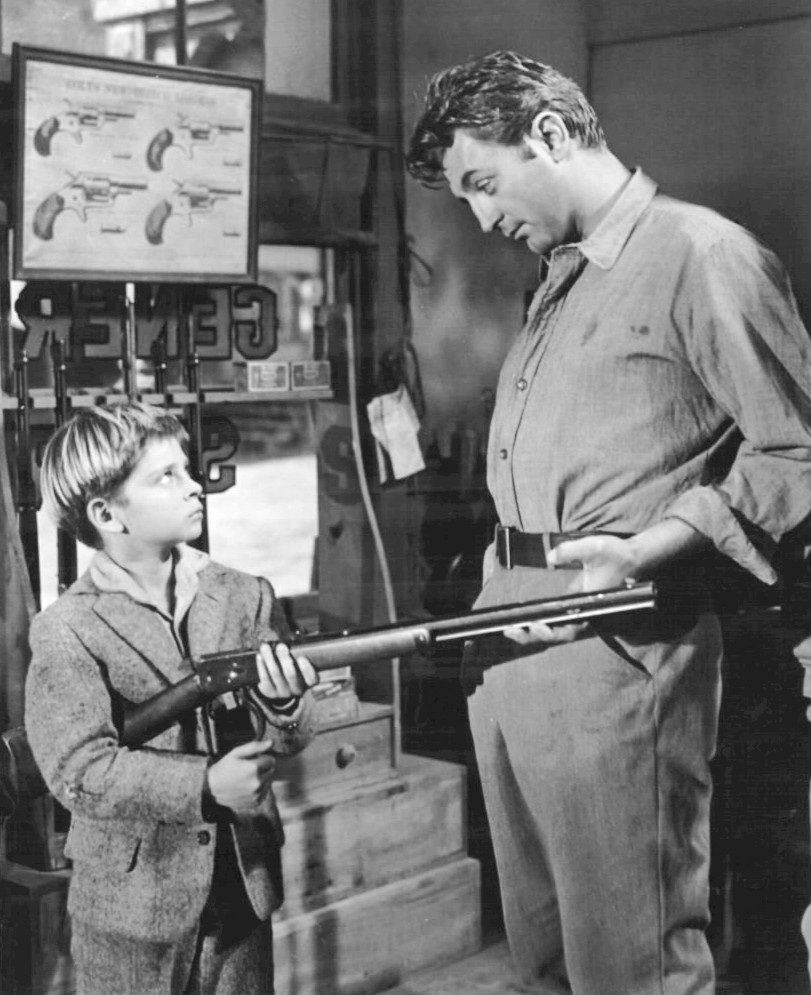
With Tommy Rettig in River of No Return (1954)

| Year | Title | Role | Notes | Ref. |
|---|---|---|---|---|
| 1950 | Where Danger Lives | Dr. Jeff Cameron | | |
| 1951 | My Forbidden Past | Dr. Mark Lucas | | |
| 1951 | His Kind of Woman | Dan Milner | | |
| 1951 | The Racket | Captain Thomas McQuigg | | |
| 1952 | Macao | Nick Cochran | | |
| 1952 | One Minute to Zero | Col. Steve Janowski | | |
| 1952 | The Lusty Men | Jeff McCloud | | |
| 1952 | Angel Face | Frank Jessup | | |
| 1953 | White Witch Doctor | John 'Lonni' Douglas | | |
| 1953 | Second Chance | Russ Lambert | | |
| 1954 | She Couldn't Say No | Dr. Robert Sellers | | |
| 1954 | River of No Return | Matt Calder | | |
| 1954 | Track of the Cat | Curt Bridges | | |
| 1955 | Not as a Stranger | Lucas Marsh | | |
| 1955 | The Night of the Hunter | Harry Powell | | |
| 1955 | Man with the Gun | Clint Tollinger | | |
| 1956 | Foreign Intrigue | Dave Bishop | | |
| 1956 | Bandido | Wilson | | |
| 1957 | Heaven Knows, Mr. Allison | Cpl. Allison, USMC | | |
| 1957 | Fire Down Below | Felix Bowers | | |
| 1957 | The Enemy Below | Capt. Murrell | | |
| 1958 | Thunder Road | Lucas Doolin | | |
| 1958 | The Hunters | Major Cleve Saville | | |
| 1959 | The Angry Hills | Mike Morrison | | |
| 1959 | The Wonderful Country | Martin Brady | | |

=== 1960–1970s ===
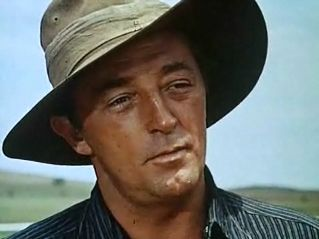
In The Sundowners (1960)

| Year | Title | Role | Notes | Ref. |
|---|---|---|---|---|
| 1960 | Home from the Hill | Captain Wade Hunnicutt | | |
| 1960 | A Terrible Beauty | Dermot O'Neill | a.k.a. The Night Fighters | |
| 1960 | The Sundowners | Paddy Carmody | | |
| 1960 | The Grass Is Greener | Charles Delacro | | |
| 1961 | The Last Time I Saw Archie | Archie Hall | | |
| 1962 | Cape Fear | Max Cady | | |
| 1962 | The Longest Day | Brig. Gen. Norman Cota | | |
| 1962 | Two for the Seesaw | Jerry Ryan | | |
| 1963 | The List of Adrian Messenger | Slattery | Cameo | |
| 1963 | Rampage | Harry Stanton | | |
| 1963 | Man in the Middle | Lieutenant Colonel Barney Adams | a.k.a. The Winston Affair | |
| 1964 | What a Way to Go! | Rod Anderson, Jr. | | |
| 1965 | Mister Moses | Joe Moses | | |
| 1967 | The Way West | Dick Summers | | |
| 1967 | El Dorado | El Dorado Sheriff J.P. Harrah | | |
| 1968 | Villa Rides | Lee Arnold | | |
| 1968 | 5 Card Stud | The Rev. Jonathan Rudd | | |
| 1968 | Anzio | Dick Ennis | a.k.a. The Battle for Anzio | |
| 1968 | Secret Ceremony | Albert | | |
| 1969 | Young Billy Young | Deputy Ben Kane | | |
| 1969 | The Good Guys and the Bad Guys | Jim Flagg | | |
| 1970 | Ryan's Daughter | Charles | | |
| 1970 | A Movable Scene | Narrator | Short film, first in The Distant Drummer documentary series | |
| 1970 | A Movable Feast | Narrator | Short film; second in The Distant Drummer documentary series | |
| 1971 | Going Home | Harry K. Graham | | |
| 1972 | The Wrath of God | Father Oliver Van Horne | | |
| 1973 | The Friends of Eddie Coyle | Eddie "Fingers" Coyle | | |
| 1974 | The Yakuza | Harry Kilmer | | |
| 1975 | Farewell, My Lovely | Marlowe | | |
| 1976 | Midway | Admiral William F. Halsey | | |
| 1976 | The Last Tycoon | Pat Brady | | |
| 1977 | The Amsterdam Kill | Larry Quinlan | | |
| 1978 | The Big Sleep | Philip Marlowe | | |
| 1978 | Matilda | Duke Parkhurst | | |
| 1979 | Breakthrough | Col. Rogers | | |

=== 1980s–1990s ===
| Year | Title | Role(s) | Notes | Ref. |
|---|---|---|---|---|
| 1980 | Agency | Ted Quinn | a.k.a. Mind Games | |
| 1980 | Nightkill | Donner / Rodriguez | | |
| 1982 | That Championship Season | Coach Delaney | | |
| 1984 | The Ambassador | Peter Hacker | | |
| 1984 | Maria's Lovers | Mr. Bibic | | |
| 1988 | Mr. North | Mr. Bosworth | | |
| 1988 | Scrooged | Preston Rhinelander | | |
| 1990 | Présumé dangereux | Prof. Forrester | a.k.a. Believed Violent | |
| 1990 | Midnight Ride | Dr. Hardy | | |
| 1991 | Cape Fear | Lieutenant Elgart | | |
| 1992 | Les sept péchés capitaux | Dieu | | |
| 1993 | Tombstone | Narrator | Voice | |
| 1994 | Woman of Desire | Walter J. Hill | | |
| 1995 | Backfire! | Marshal Marc Marshall | | |
| 1995 | Dead Man | John Dickinson | | |
| 1995 | Pakten | Ernest Bogan | a.k.a. Waiting for Sunset | |
| 1997 | James Dean: Live Fast, Die Young | George Stevens | | |

== Television ==
| Year | Title | Role | Notes | Ref(s) |
|---|---|---|---|---|
| 1982 | One Shoe Makes It Murder | Harold Shillman | TV film | |
| 1983 | A Killer in the Family | Gary Tison | TV film | |
| 1983 | The Winds of War | Victor "Pug" Henry | Mini-series | |
| 1985 | North and South | Patrick Flynn | Mini-series | |
| 1985 | Promises to Keep | Jack Palmer | TV film | |
| 1985 | Reunion at Fairborough | Carl Hostrup | TV film | |
| 1986 | Thompson's Last Run | – | TV film; a.k.a. The Last Run | |
| 1987 | The Equalizer | Richard Dyson | Episode: "Mission: McCall: Part 1 & 2" | |
| 1988 | War and Remembrance | Victor 'Pug' Henry | Mini-series | |
| 1989 | Brotherhood of the Rose | John Eliot | Mini-series | |
| 1989 | Jake Spanner, Private Eye | Jake Spanner | TV film | |
| 1990 | A Family for Joe | Joe Whitaker | 9 episodes | |
| 1990 | Waiting for the Wind | – | Short film | |
| 1992 | African Skies | Sam Dutton | 17 episodes | |
| 1995 | The Marshal | Frank MacBride | Episode: "The New Marshal" | |

== Bibliography ==
- Agnew, Jeremy (October 25, 2012). The Old West in Fact and Film: History Versus Hollywood. McFarland. ISBN 978-0-7864-6888-1.
- Armstrong, Stephen B. (September 7, 2011). Andrew V. McLaglen: The Life and Hollywood Career. McFarland. ISBN 978-0-7864-8670-0.
- Connelly, Mark (January 10, 2014). The IRA on Film and Television: A History. McFarland. ISBN 978-0-7864-8961-9.
- Freese, Gene (2019). The Western Films of Robert Mitchum Hollywood's Cowboy Rebel. McFarland & Company, Inc. ISBN 9781476678498.
- House Committee on Education and Labor, United States Congress (1967). Hearings, Reports, Public Laws. U.S. Government Printing Office.
- Lentz, Robert J. (September 15, 2015). Lee Marvin: His Films and Career. McFarland. ISBN 978-1-4766-0405-3.
- Lentz, Robert J. (May 1, 2016). Korean War Filmography: 91 English Language Features through 2000. McFarland. ISBN 978-1-4766-2154-8.
- Margraff, Guy (2000). Les rôles muets ont la parole: les coulisses de la figuration en Belgique (in French). Editions Dricot. ISBN 978-2-87095-232-0.
- Marill, Alvin H. (June 1, 2011). Television Westerns: Six Decades of Sagebrush Sheriffs, Scalawags, and Sidewinders. Scarecrow Press. ISBN 978-0-8108-8133-4.
- Mayer, Geoff; McDonnell, Brian (2007). Encyclopedia of Film Noir (1. publ. ed.). Westport, Conn. [u.a.]: Greenwood Press. ISBN 978-0313333064.
- Milberg, Doris (March 10, 2010). World War II on the Big Screen: 450+ Films, 1938–2008. McFarland. ISBN 978-0-7864-5574-4.
- Roberts, Jerry (2000). Mitchum: In His Own Words. New York: Proscenium Publishers, Inc. ISBN 0879102926.
- Schickel, Richard (November 29, 2009). Cary Grant: A Celebration. Little, Brown. ISBN 978-0-316-09032-2.
- Server, Lee (2001). Robert Mitchum: Baby I Don't Care (1st St. Martin's Griffin ed.). New York: St. Martins Griffin. ISBN 0312285434.
