= Undercover Man (1942 film) =

1942 film by Lesley Selander

- Directed by: Lesley Selander
- Written by: Clarence E. Mulford (characters); J. Benton Cheney (screenplay)
- Produced by: Harry Sherman
- Starring: William Boyd
- Cinematography: Russell Harlan
- Music by: Paul Sawtell
- Distributed by: United Artists
- Release date: October 23, 1942
- Running time: 68 minutes
- Country: United States
- Language: English

Undercover Man is a 1942 American Western film directed by Lesley Selander and starring William Boyd. The film is a serial Western and part of the Hopalong Cassidy series. It is the 44th entry in a series of 66 films.

== Cast ==
- William Boyd as Hopalong Cassidy
- Andy Clyde as California Carlson
- Jay Kirby as Breezy Travers
- Antonio Moreno as Don Thomas Gonzales
- Nora Lane as Doña Louise Saunders
- Chris-Pin Martin as Miguel
- Esther Estrella as Dolores Gonzales
- John Vosper as Deputy Ed Carson
- Eva Puig as Rosita Lopez
- Alan Baldwin as Bob Saunders
- Jack Rockwell as Capt. John Hawkins
- Pierce Lyden as Henchman Bart
- Rony Roux as Chavez
