= George Reeves =

American actor (1914–1959)

- Reeves in 1948
- Born: George Keefer Brewer; January 5, 1914; Woolstock, Iowa, U.S.
- Died: June 16, 1959 (aged 45); Los Angeles, California, U.S.
- Cause of death: Suicide by gunshot
- Resting place: Mountain View Cemetery and Mausoleum, Altadena, California, U.S. 34.1840°N 118.1497°W
- Other name: George Bessolo
- Education: Pasadena Junior College
- Occupation: Actor
- Years active: 1939–1959
- Spouse: Ellanora Needles (m. 1940; div. 1950)

George Reeves (born George Keefer Brewer; January 5, 1914 – June 16, 1959) was an American actor. He was best known for portraying Clark Kent/Superman in the television series Adventures of Superman (1952–1958).

His death by gunshot at age 45 remains controversial. The official finding was suicide, but some believe that he was murdered or the victim of an accidental shooting.

== Early life ==
Reeves was born in Woolstock, Iowa, the son of Donald Carl Brewer and Helen Lescher. Reeves was born five months into their marriage. When the couple separated, soon after Reeves's birth, Reeves and his mother moved from Iowa to Ashland, Kentucky, to stay with relatives for a time and then to her home in Galesburg, Illinois.

Later, Reeves's mother, who was of German descent, moved to California to stay with her sister. There, by 1920, she had met and married Frank Joseph Bessolo (according to that year's federal census). Reeves's father married Helen Schultz in 1925. Reeves reportedly never saw his father again. Helen later told George that his father had committed suicide. In 1927, when Reeves was 13, Frank Bessolo adopted him, and the boy took his stepfather's last name, becoming George Bessolo. The Bessolos’ marriage lasted 15 years, ending in divorce.

Reeves began acting and singing in high school and continued performing on stage as a student at Pasadena Junior College.

== Acting career ==
While studying acting at the Pasadena Playhouse, Reeves met his future wife, Ellanora Needles, great-great-granddaughter of John Robinson, who had been a circus magnate and founder of the John Robinson Circus. They married on September 22, 1940, in San Gabriel, California, at the Church of Our Savior. They had no children and divorced 10 years later.

Reeves's film career began in 1939 when he was cast as Stuart Tarleton (incorrectly listed in the film's credits as Brent Tarleton), one of Scarlett O'Hara's suitors in Gone with the Wind. It was a minor role, but he and Fred Crane were in the film's opening scene. (Reeves and Crane both dyed their hair red to portray the Tarleton twins.) After Gone with the Wind was filmed, Reeves returned to the Pasadena Playhouse and was given the lead role in the play Pancho. This part directly led to his being contracted to Warner Brothers. Warner had him change his professional name to George Reeves. His Gone with the Wind screen credit reflects the change. Between the start of production on Gone With the Wind and its release 12 months later, several films on his Warner contract were made and released, making Gone With the Wind his first film role, but his fifth film release.

He starred in a number of two-reel short subjects and appeared in several films, including two with future President of the United States Ronald Reagan and three with James Cagney (Torrid Zone, The Fighting 69th, and The Strawberry Blonde). These roles did little to advance Reeves's career, and his contract with Warners was dissolved by mutual consent.

Released from his Warner contract, he signed a contract with Twentieth Century-Fox but was released after only a handful of films, one of which was the Charlie Chan movie Dead Men Tell. Twentieth Century-Fox loaned him to producer Alexander Korda to co-star with Merle Oberon in Lydia, a box-office failure, after which he freelanced, looking to find work in westerns. His friend Teddi Sherman introduced him to her father, producer Harry Sherman, who asked Reeves to take a screen test with Teddi for the Hopalong Cassidy films. Reeves and Sherman impressed the casting director by performing seven pages of script in a single take without pause. Reeves appeared in five Hopalong Cassidy westerns before being cast as Lieutenant John Summers opposite Claudette Colbert in So Proudly We Hail! (1942), a war drama for Paramount Pictures, which signed Reeves up for two films a year.

However, Reeves was inspired by So Proudly We Hail! to put his budding acting career on hold and enlist in the U.S. Army. He was drafted in early 1943. He was assigned to the U.S. Army Air Forces and performed in the USAAF's Broadway show Winged Victory. The long Broadway run was followed by a national tour and a movie version. Reeves was then transferred to the Army Air Force’s First Motion Picture Unit, where he made training films.

Discharged at the war's end, Reeves returned to Hollywood. Many studios were slowing down their production schedules, however, and some production units had shut down completely. He appeared in a pair of outdoor thrillers with Ralph Byrd. As more and more time passed between acting jobs that paid less and less, Reeves was reduced to appearing in a low-budget serial produced by Sam Katzman, The Adventures of Sir Galahad, and taking a second job digging cesspools. Reeves fit the rugged requirements of the roles, and, with his excellent memory for dialogue, he did well under rushed production conditions. He was able to play against type, starring as a villainous gold hunter in a Johnny Weissmuller Jungle Jim film. After separating from his wife, Reeves moved to New York City in 1949 (their divorce became final in 1950). He performed on live television anthology programs, as well as on radio, and then returned to Hollywood in 1951 for a role in a Fritz Lang film, Rancho Notorious.

In 1953, Reeves played a minor character, Sergeant Maylon Stark, in From Here to Eternity. The film won the Academy Award for Best Picture and gave Reeves the distinction of having appeared in two "Best Picture" films.

=== Superman ===
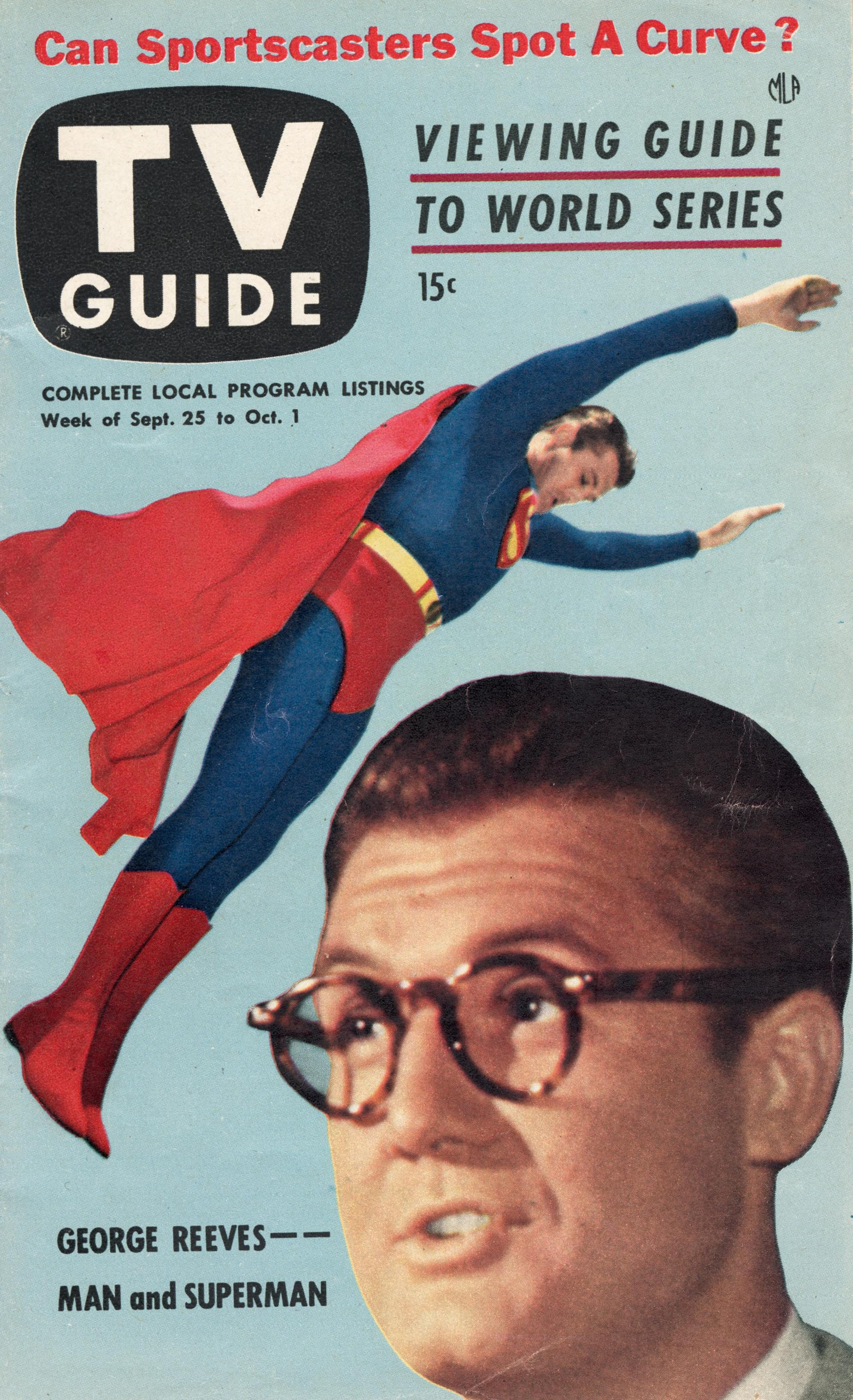
Reeves on the cover of TV Guide, September 25, 1953

In June 1951, Reeves was offered the role of Superman in a new television series titled Adventures of Superman. He was initially reluctant to take the role because, like many actors of his time, he considered television unimportant and believed few would see his work. The half-hour films were shot on tight schedules; at least two shows were made every seven days. According to commentaries on the Adventures of Superman DVD sets, multiple scripts were filmed simultaneously and out of sequence to take advantage of the standing sets; for example, all the "Perry White's office" scenes for three or four episodes would be shot the same day, and the various "apartment" scenes would also be done consecutively.

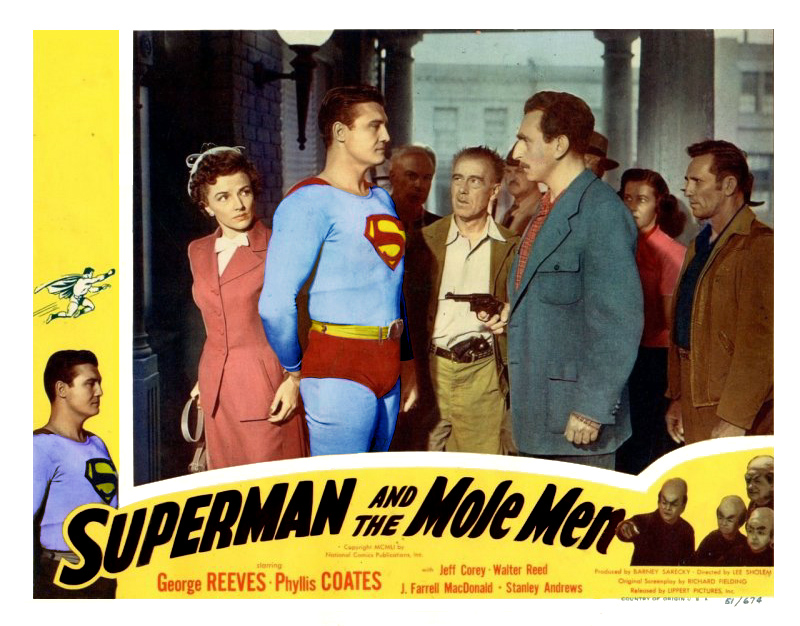
Lobby card for Superman and the Mole Men (1951), starring Reeves as Superman

Reeves's career as Superman had begun with Superman and the Mole Men, a film intended both as a B-picture and as the pilot for the TV series. Immediately after completing it, Reeves and the crew began production of the first season's episodes, all shot over 13 weeks in the summer of 1951. The series went on the air the following year, and Reeves was amazed at becoming a national celebrity. In 1952, the struggling ABC Network purchased the show for national broadcast, which gave him greater visibility.

The Superman cast members had restrictive contracts preventing them from taking other work that might interfere with the series. Except for the second season, the Superman schedule was brief (13 shows shot two per week, a total of seven weeks out of a year), but all had a "30-day clause", which meant that the producers could demand their exclusive services for a new season on four weeks' notice. This prevented long-term work on major films with long schedules, stage plays that might lead to a lengthy run, or any other series work.

Reeves, however, was able to leverage his new role and earn additional income by making numerous personal appearances. He had affection for his young fans and took his role-model status seriously. He avoided smoking cigarettes where children could see him and eventually quit smoking. He kept his private life discreet, including a romantic relationship with Toni Mannix, wife of Metro-Goldwyn-Mayer general manager Eddie Mannix.

In the 2006 documentary Look, Up in the Sky: The Amazing Story of Superman, Jack Larson said that, when he first met Reeves, he told him that he enjoyed his performance in So Proudly We Hail! According to Larson, Reeves said that if Mark Sandrich had not died, he would not be there in "this monkey suit". According to Larson, Reeves also said he would feel better about the role if he knew he had any adult fans; he never learned that Adventures of Superman had adult fans even during its original broadcast run. However, the book Flights of Fancy: The Unauthorized but True Story of Radio & TV's Adventures of Superman by Michael Hayde challenges Larson's claim, asserting that Reeves knew almost from the beginning that adults were enjoying the show and that he generally enjoyed the Superman role.

Between the first and second seasons of Superman, Reeves got sporadic acting assignments in one-shot TV anthology programs and in two feature films, Forever Female (1953) and Fritz Lang's The Blue Gardenia (1953), but by the time the series was airing nationwide, Reeves found himself so closely associated with the characters of Superman and Clark Kent that it was difficult for him to book other roles.

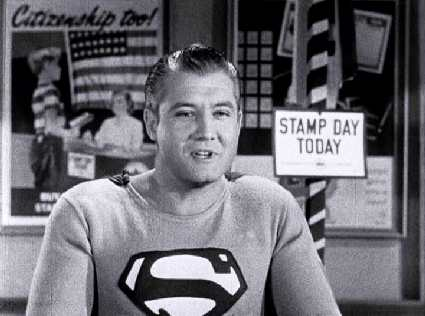
Reeves in Stamp Day for Superman (1954)

During the show's run, Reeves worked tirelessly with Toni Mannix to raise money for fighting myasthenia gravis; his efforts resulted in his being appointed as national chairman for the Myasthenia Gravis Foundation in 1955. During the second season, Reeves returned to working with the government when he appeared in a short film for the Treasury Department entitled Stamp Day for Superman, in which he caught the villains and told children why they should invest in government savings stamps.

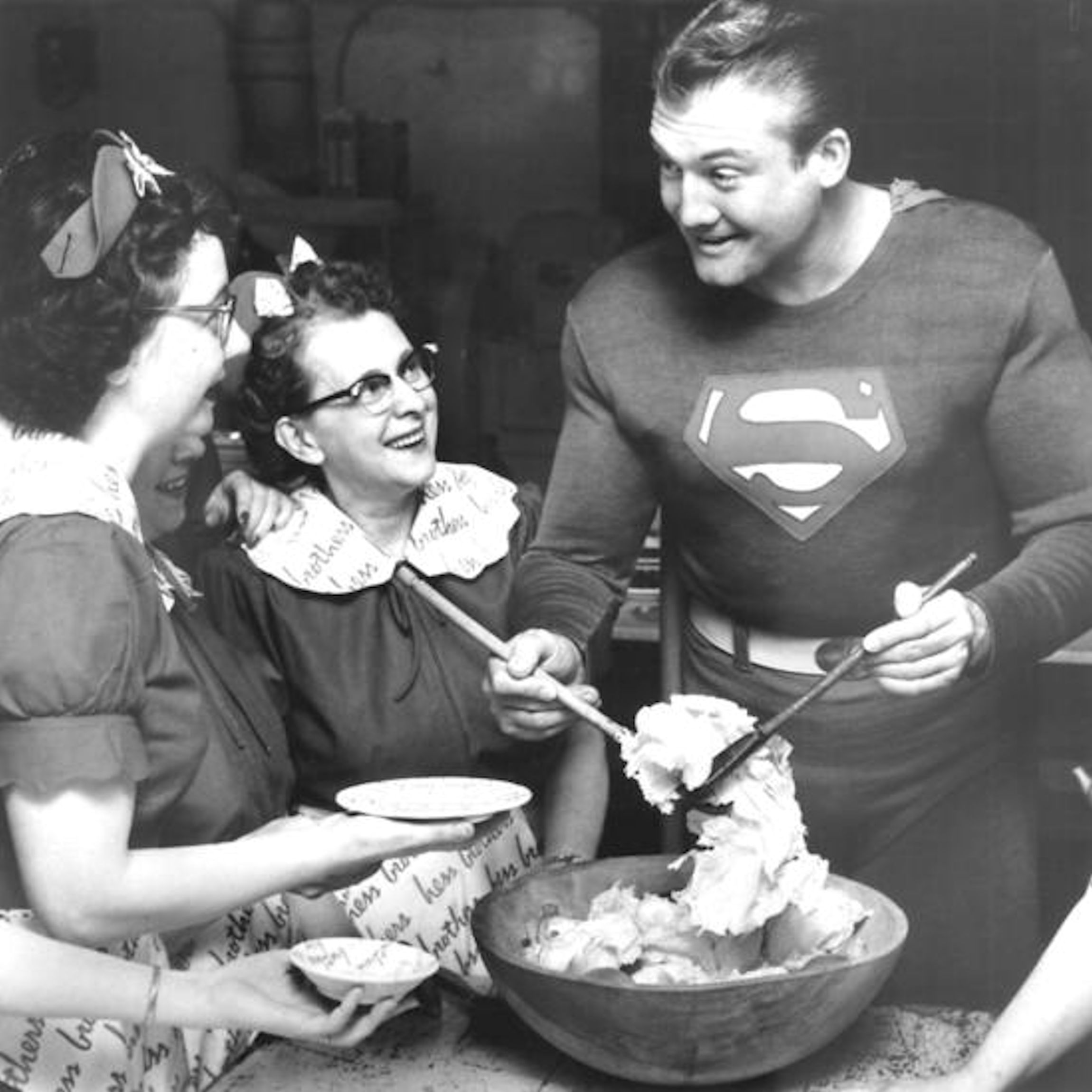
Reeves as Superman at the Patio Restaurant (1958)

After two seasons, Reeves decided not to renew his contract and left the show. He was frustrated with his low salary, the one-dimensional nature of his character, and how associating himself with Superman had ruined his credibility as a dramatic actor. At 40 years old, he also felt uncomfortable playing such an intensely physical role.

Eager to jump-start his failing career, Reeves established his own production company and conceived a TV adventure series called Port of Entry, which was to be shot on location in Hawaii and Mexico. Reeves wrote the pilot script himself. However, the producers of Superman, unable to find a suitable replacement, lured him back to the show with a major salary increase. He was reportedly making $5,000 (about $63,396 in today's dollars) per week, but only while the show was in production (about eight weeks each year). Reeves was never able to gain financing for his Port of Entry project, and the show was never made.

In 1957, the producers considered making a theatrical film: Superman and the Secret Planet. A script was commissioned from David Chantler, who had written many of the TV scripts. In 1959, however, negotiations began for a renewal of the series, with 26 episodes scheduled to go into production. By mid-1959, contracts were signed, costumes refitted, and new teleplay writers assigned. Noel Neill was quoted as saying that the cast of Superman was ready to do a new series of the still-popular show.

His good friend Bill Walsh, a producer at Disney Studios, gave Reeves a prominent role in Westward Ho the Wagons! (1956), in which Reeves wore a beard and mustache; it would be his final film appearance. Attempting to showcase his versatility, Reeves performed a song on the Tony Bennett show in August 1956. He appeared as Superman on I Love Lucy (Episode #166, "Lucy and Superman") in 1957. Character actor Ben Welden had acted with Reeves in the Warner Bros. days and frequently guest-starred on Superman. He said, "After the I Love Lucy show, Superman was no longer a challenge to him... I know he enjoyed the role, but he used to say, 'Here I am, wasting my life.'"

Reeves, Noel Neill, Natividad Vacío, Gene LeBell, and a trio of musicians toured with a public-appearance show from 1957 onward. The first half of the show was a Superman sketch in which Reeves and Neill performed with LeBell as a villain called "Mr. Kryptonite" who captured Lois Lane. Kent then rushed offstage to return as Superman, who came to the rescue and fought with the bad guy. The second half of the show was Reeves out of costume as himself, singing and accompanying himself on the guitar. Vacio and Neill accompanied him in duets.

Reeves and Toni Mannix split in 1958 and Reeves announced his engagement to society playgirl Leonore Lemmon. Reeves was apparently scheduled to marry Lemmon on June 19 and then spend their honeymoon in Tijuana. He complained to friends, columnists, and his mother about his financial problems. The planned revival of Superman was apparently a small lifeline. Reeves had also hoped to direct a low-budget science-fiction film written by a friend from his Pasadena Playhouse days, and he had discussed the project with his first Lois Lane, Phyllis Coates, the previous year. However, Reeves and his partner failed to find financing, and the film was never made. Another Superman stage show was scheduled for July with a planned stage tour of Australia. Reeves had options for making a living, but those options apparently all involved playing Superman again—a role that he was not eager to reprise at age 45.

Jack Larson and Noel Neill both remembered Reeves as a noble Southern gentleman (even though he was from Iowa) with a sign on his dressing room door that said "Honest George, the people's friend". Reeves had been made a "Kentucky Colonel" during a publicity trip in the South, and the sign on his dressing room door was replaced with a new one that read "Honest George, also known as Col. Reeves", created by the show's prop department. A photo of a smiling Reeves and the sign appears in Gary Grossman's book about the show.

== Death ==
Reeves died of a gunshot wound to the head, in the upstairs bedroom of his home at 1579 Benedict Canyon Drive in Benedict Canyon between 1:30 and 2:00 a.m. on June 16, 1959, according to the Los Angeles Police Department (LAPD) report.

Leonore Lemmon and other party guests were in the home at the time. Lemmon told the police that she was in the living room with the guests at the time of the shooting, but hearsay statements from Fred Crane, Reeves's friend and colleague from Gone with the Wind, put Lemmon either inside or in direct proximity to Reeves's bedroom. According to Crane (who was not present), Bill Bliss had told Millicent Trent that after the shot rang out, while Bliss was having a drink, Lemmon came downstairs and said, "Tell them I was down here, tell them I was down here!"

A number of questionable physical findings were reported by investigators and others. No fingerprints were recovered from the gun. No gunpowder residue was found on Reeves's hands. (Some sources contend that it may not have been sought, as gunshot residue testing was not routinely performed at the time.) The bullet that killed Reeves was recovered from the bedroom ceiling, and the spent shell casing was found under his nude body. Two additional bullets were discovered embedded in the bedroom floor. All three bullets had been fired from the weapon found at Reeves's feet, though all witnesses agreed they heard only one gunshot, and there was no sign of forced entry or other physical evidence that a second person was in the room. Despite the unanswered questions, Reeves's death was officially ruled a suicide, based on witness statements, physical evidence at the scene, and the autopsy report.

In contemporaneous news articles, Lemmon attributed Reeves's alleged suicide to depression caused by his "failed career" and inability to find more work. The report made by the LAPD states, "[Reeves was] ... depressed because he couldn't get the sort of parts he wanted." Newspapers and wire-service reports quoted LAPD Sergeant V. A. Peterson as saying: "Miss Lemmon blurted, 'He's probably going to go shoot himself.' A noise was heard upstairs. She continued, 'He's opening a drawer to get the gun.' A shot was heard. 'See there — I told you so!'"

Reeves is interred at Mountain View Cemetery and Mausoleum in Altadena, California. In 1960, Reeves was awarded a star on the Hollywood Walk of Fame on Hollywood Boulevard for his contributions to the television industry. In 1985, he was posthumously named one of the honorees by DC Comics in the company's 50th anniversary publication Fifty Who Made DC Great.

=== Controversy ===
Reeves's mother thought it was premature and peremptory to rule the death a suicide, and retained attorney Jerry Giesler to petition for a reinvestigation of the case as a possible homicide. The findings of a second autopsy, conducted at Giesler's request, were the same as the first, except for a series of bruises of unknown origin about the head and body. A month later, having uncovered no evidence contradicting the official finding, Giesler announced that he was satisfied that the gunshot wound had been self-inflicted and withdrew.

Actors Alan Ladd and Gig Young were reportedly skeptical of the official determination. Reeves's friend Rory Calhoun told a reporter, "No one in Hollywood believed the suicide story." In their book Hollywood Kryptonite, Sam Kashner and Nancy Schoenberger make a case for the involvement of MGM vice president and fixer Eddie Mannix. Reeves had been having an affair with his wife, Toni Mannix. Others suggested that Mannix, rumored to have Mafia ties, ordered Reeves killed. In June 2025, People noted that Reeves had ended his affair with Toni to begin an affair with Leonore Lemmon.

=== In popular culture ===
The 2006 film Hollywoodland starred Ben Affleck as Reeves and Diane Lane as Toni Mannix. Adrien Brody plays Louis Simo, a fictional private investigator with a working class Italian American background and an obsession with chasing fame and fortune. Simo is partially inspired by actual private detective Milo Speriglio, who was hired by Reeves's mother to investigate her son's death. The film's fictionalized investigation suggests four possible explanations:

1. An accidental shooting by an angry and intoxicated Leonore Lemmon during an argument.
2. A contract killing arranged by Eddie Mannix, who is also hinted to have sabotaged Reeves' efforts to found his own production company, in retaliation for breaking Toni's heart.
3. A revenge killing by a jealous and heartbroken Toni Mannix, who allegedly still had the house keys and knew a separate way in and out of the upstairs room; covered up afterwards by Eddie Mannix out of loyalty and genuine love for his wife.
4. A suicide rooted in Reeves' belief that his acting career was over and he was also a failure in his personal life.

While seeking to remain open-ended, the film implies that suicide is the most likely explanation for Reeves's death. This climactic realization devastates Brody's character, but also causes him to reevaluate his own priorities in life, which ultimately causes him to cease chasing celebrity status and focus instead upon his neglected role as a family man.

A computer graphics version of Reeves as Superman appears in the DC Extended Universe film The Flash (2023). The use of the computer graphics rendering was criticized by some fans.

== Filmography ==
=== Film ===
Year	Title	Role	Notes
1939	Espionage Agent	Warrington's secretary (uncredited)	Feature film
1939	On Dress Parade	Southern soldier in trench (uncredited)	Feature film
1939	Four Wives	Laboratory Man (uncredited)	Feature film
1939	Smashing the Money Ring	Trial Spectator (uncredited)	Feature film
1939	The Monroe Doctrine	John Sturgis	Short film
1939	Ride, Cowboy, Ride	Pancho Dominguez	Short film
1939	Gone with the Wind	Stuart Tarleton – one of Scarlett's many suitors (credited erroneously onscreen as playing Brent Tarleton - see above)	Feature film
1940	The Fighting 69th	Jack O'Keefe (uncredited)	Feature film
1940	Calling Philo Vance	Steamship Clerk (uncredited)	Feature film
1940	Father Is a Prince	Gary Lee	Feature film
1940	Virginia City	Major Drewery's telegrapher (uncredited)	Feature film
1940	Tear Gas Squad	Joe McCabe	Feature film
1940	Pony Express Days	William F. "Buffalo Bill" Cody	20 min. short film
1940	Meet the Fleet	Benson	Short film
1940	Calling All Husbands	Dan Williams	Feature film
1940	Always a Bride	Mike Stevens	Feature film
1940	'Til We Meet Again	Jimmy Coburn	Feature film
1940	Ladies Must Live	George Halliday	Feature film
1940	Torrid Zone	Sancho, Rosario's Henchman	Feature film
1940	Gambling on the High Seas	Newspaper Reporter	Feature film
1940	Knute Rockne, All American	Distraught Player (uncredited)	Feature film (aka A Modern Hero)
1940	Argentine Nights	Eduardo 'El Tigre' Estaban	Feature film (sings in this role)
1941	The Strawberry Blonde	Harold	Feature film
1941	Blood and Sand	Captain Pierre Lauren	Feature film
1941	The Lady and the Lug	Doug Abbott	Short film
1941	Throwing a Party	Larry Scoffield	Short film
1941	Lydia	Bob Willard	Feature film (aka Illusions)
1941	Man at Large	Bob Grayson	Feature film
1941	Dead Men Tell	Bill Lydig	Feature film
1942	Border Patrol	Don Enrique Perez	Feature film
1942	Blue, White and Perfect	Juan Arturo O'Hara	Feature film
1942	The Mad Martindales	Julio Rigo	Feature film
1942	Sex Hygiene	Pool player #1	U.S. Army training film
1943	Hoppy Serves a Writ	Steve Jordan	Hopalong Cassidy movie
1943	Buckskin Frontier	Surveyor	Feature film
1943	The Leather Burners	Harrison Brooke	Feature film
1943	Bar 20	Lin Bradley	Feature film
1943	Colt Comrades	Lin Whitlock	Feature film
1943	So Proudly We Hail!	Lt. John Summers	Feature film
1943	The Kansan	Jesse James (uncredited)	Feature film
1944	Winged Victory	Lt. Thompson	Feature film
1945	Airborne Lifeboat	Pilot	TV film
1947	Champagne for Two	Jerry Malone	Feature film (aka Musical Parade: Champagne for Two)
1947	Variety Girl	Himself (uncredited)	Feature film
1948	Jungle Goddess	Mike Patton	Feature film
1948	Thunder in the Pines	Jeff Collins	Feature film (released in sepiatone)
1948	The Sainted Sisters	Sam Stoakes	Feature film
1948	Jungle Jim	Bruce Edwards	Feature film
1949	The Great Lover	Williams	Feature film
1949	Samson and Delilah	Wounded messenger	Feature film
1949	Adventures of Sir Galahad	Sir Galahad	15-chapter film serial
1950	The Good Humor Man	Stuart Nagle	Feature film
1951	Superman and the Mole Men	Superman/Clark Kent	Feature film (aka Superman and the Strange People)
1952	Rancho Notorious	Wilson	Feature film
1953	The Blue Gardenia	Police Capt. Sam Haynes	Feature film
1953	From Here to Eternity	Sgt. Maylon Stark (uncredited)	Feature film
1954	Stamp Day for Superman	Superman/Clark Kent	Educational short film
1956	Westward Ho the Wagons!	James Stephen	Final film role

=== Television ===
Year	Title	Role	Episode(s)
1949	The Clock		2 episodes
1949	Actors Studio		Episode: "The Midway"
1949–1950	The Silver Theatre	Frank Telford	2 episodes
1949–1950	Suspense	Various roles	4 episodes
1949–1952	Kraft Television Theatre	Various roles	7 episodes
1950	Believe It or Not		Episode: "Journey Through the Darkness"
1950	The Trap		Episode: "Sentence of Death"
1950	Starlight Theatre		2 episodes
1950	The Web		2 episodes
1950	Hands of Murder		"Blood Money"
1950	The Adventures of Ellery Queen		Episode: "The Star of India"
1950–1951	Lights Out		2 episodes
1952–1958	Adventures of Superman	Superman/Clark Kent	104 episodes
1952	Fireside Theater	John Carter	Episode: "Hurry Hurry"
1952	Ford Theatre	James Lindsey – Father	Episode: "Heart of Gold"
1955	Funny Boners	Superman	March 15, 1955
1957	I Love Lucy	Superman	Episode: "Lucy and Superman"
