= Lost Canyon =

1942 film by Lesley Selander

- Theatrical release poster
- Directed by: Lesley Selander
- Screenplay by: Harry O. Hoyt
- Produced by: Harry Sherman
- Starring: William Boyd; Andy Clyde; Jay Kirby; Lola Lane; Douglas Fowley; Herbert Rawlinson
- Cinematography: Russell Harlan
- Edited by: Carroll Lewis
- Music by: Paul Sawtell
- Production company: Harry Sherman Productions
- Distributed by: United Artists
- Release date: December 18, 1942
- Running time: 61 minutes
- Country: United States
- Language: English

Lost Canyon is a 1942 American Western film directed by Lesley Selander and written by Harry O. Hoyt. The film stars William Boyd, Andy Clyde, Jay Kirby, Lola Lane, Douglas Fowley and Herbert Rawlinson. The film is a remake of Rustlers' Valley (1937). The film was released on December 18, 1942, by United Artists.

== Cast ==
- William Boyd as Hopalong Cassidy
- Andy Clyde as California Carlson
- Jay Kirby as Johnny Travers
- Lola Lane as Laura Clark
- Douglas Fowley as Jeff Burton
- Herbert Rawlinson as Tom Clark
- Guy Usher as Zack Rogers, Banker
- Karl Hackett as Foreman Haskell
- Hugh Prosser as Sheriff Jim Stanton
- Bob Kortman as Joe, Burton Henchman
- The Sportsmen Quartet as Singing Cowhands
- Bill Days as Singing Ranch Hand
- John Rarig as Singing Ranch Hand
- Thurl Ravenscroft as Tall Bass-Singing Ranch Hand
- Max Smith as Singing Ranch Hand
