= Buckskin Frontier =

1943 film by Lesley Selander

- Theatrical release poster
- Directed by: Lesley Selander
- Screenplay by: Norman Houston; Bernard Schubert
- Story by: Harry Sinclair Drago
- Produced by: Harry Sherman
- Starring: Richard Dix; Jane Wyatt; Albert Dekker; Lee J. Cobb; Victor Jory; Lola Lane; Max Baer; Joe Sawyer
- Cinematography: Russell Harlan
- Edited by: Sherman A. Rose
- Music by: Victor Young
- Production company: Harry Sherman Productions
- Distributed by: United Artists
- Release date: May 14, 1943
- Running time: 77 minutes
- Country: United States
- Language: English

Buckskin Frontier is a 1943 American Western film directed by Lesley Selander and written by Norman Houston and Bernard Schubert. The film stars Richard Dix, Jane Wyatt, Albert Dekker, Lee J. Cobb, Victor Jory, Lola Lane, Max Baer and Joe Sawyer. The film was released on May 14, 1943, by United Artists.

== Plot ==
Kansas settler Jeptha Marr is leery of the railroad intruding on his territory, and opposes railroad representative Stephen Bent, only to be surprised when daughter Vinnie returns to the town of Pawnee after a long absence and is already acquainted with Stephen.

A rival railroad interest spearheaded by Champ Clanton tries to muscle its way in, trying to taint Stephen's reputation by insinuating a relationship with Rita Molyneaux, a woman with a bad reputation. By the end, though, Vinnie is reassured that Rita is actually interested in Gideon Skene, and the railroad is headed Pawnee's way under Stephen's watch.

== Cast ==
- Richard Dix as Stephen Bent
- Jane Wyatt as Vinnie Marr
- Albert Dekker as Gideon Skene
- Lee J. Cobb as Jeptha Marr
- Victor Jory as Champ Clanton
- Lola Lane as Rita Molyneaux
- Max Baer as Tiny
- Joe Sawyer as Brannigan
- Harry Allen as McWhinny
- Francis McDonald as Duval
- George Reeves as Surveyor
- Bill Nestell as Whiskers
