= Four Faces West =

1948 film by Alfred E. Green

- Directed by: Alfred E. Green
- Written by: Eugene Manlove Rhodes (novel); C. Graham Baker; Teddi Sherman; William Brent (adaptation); Milarde Brent (adaptation)
- Produced by: Harry Sherman
- Starring: Joel McCrea; Frances Dee; Charles Bickford
- Cinematography: Russell Harlan
- Edited by: Edward Mann
- Music by: Paul Sawtell
- Production company: United Artists
- Distributed by: United Artists
- Release date: August 3, 1948
- Running time: 89-90 minutes
- Country: United States
- Language: English
- Budget: $1.2 million
- Box office: $1.1 million

Four Faces West is a 1948 American Western film starring Joel McCrea, his real-life wife Frances Dee, and Charles Bickford. It is based on the novel Pasó por aquí by Eugene Manlove Rhodes. Its plot concerns a down-on-his-luck cowboy who robs a bank. For its genre the film is unusual in that not a single shot is ever fired.

== Plot ==
Ross McEwen quietly robs a bank in the New Mexico town of Santa Maria, taking the banker Frenger with him, then letting him go a few miles away, minus boots but with an I.O.U. for the $2000 he has taken.

When he gets back to town, Frenger offers a reward of $3000, dead or alive. Pat Garrett, the new marshal, warns the bounty hunters against unnecessary shooting, particularly in the back. McEwen is bitten by a rattlesnake before he can board a train, where he is helped by a passenger, nurse Fay Hollister.

The posse stop the train and search it, but quick thinking on McEwen's part (masquerading as the sleeping Hollister's husband, complete with fake baby) and a vague description of the robber save the wanted man. However, Monte Marquez, a gambler passenger, observes and overhears enough to figure out what McEwen has done.

The train tracks are washed out near Albuquerque, so the small group goes off alone via a route used to deliver mail. Fay finds out a posse from Santa Maria is after a wanted man and recalls that is where McEwen came on board. But he and she have developed an attraction to each other.

When they reach an Alamogordo saloon that Marquez's cousins run, a cattleman named Burnett is willing to take on McEwen as a hired hand. Garrett and deputy Clint Waters come to town, so McEwen must leave, but offers her an engagement ring. Fay rides along, but ends up separated and captured by Garrett's men.

After crossing the desert with difficulty, McEwen comes across a Mexican rancher named Florencio, whose family is ill. He stays to help and starts a fire to signal the lawmen, needing their assistance. Marquez gets there along with Garrett and Fay, but because Florencio is another relative of his, pretends that McEwen is a total stranger.

Garrett is not fooled, though, and McEwen is convinced to turn himself in, the marshal promising to vouch for his good deed.

== Cast ==
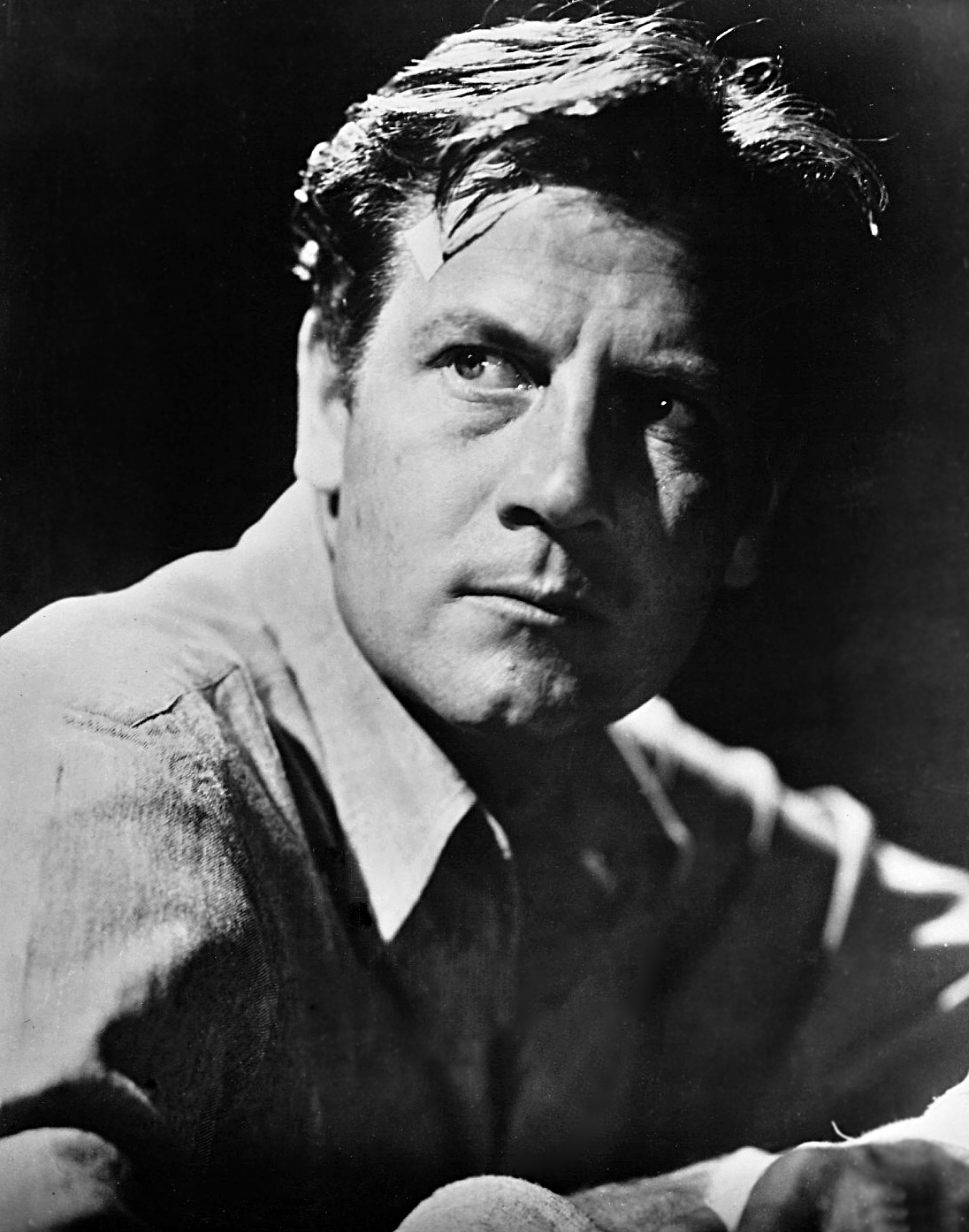
Publicity still of Joel McCrea for film

- Joel McCrea as Ross McEwen
- Frances Dee as Fay Hollister
- Charles Bickford as Pat Garrett
- Joseph Calleia as Monte Marquez
- William Conrad as Sheriff Egan
- Martin Garralaga as Florencio
- Raymond Largay as Dr. Eldredge
- John Parrish as Frenger
- Dan White as Clint Waters
- Davison Clark as Burnett
- Houseley Stevenson as Anderson
- George McDonald as Winston Boy
- Eva Novak as Mrs. Winston
- Ethan Laidlaw as Deputy (uncredited)
