= The Kansan (film) =

1943 film

- Directed by: George Archainbaud
- Written by: Frank Gruber (novel Peace Marshal); Harold Shumate (screenplay)
- Produced by: Lewis J. Rachmil (associate producer); Harry Sherman (producer)
- Starring: Richard Dix; Jane Wyatt; Albert Dekker
- Cinematography: Russell Harlan
- Edited by: Carroll Lewis
- Music by: Gerard Carbonara
- Production company: Harry Sherman Productions
- Distributed by: United Artists
- Release date: September 10, 1943
- Running time: 79 minutes
- Country: United States
- Language: English

The Kansan is a 1943 Western film directed by George Archainbaud. The film is also known as Wagon Wheels in the United Kingdom.

== Plot ==
In the late 1800s, the small town of Broken Lance in Kansas was also connected to the Pacific Railroad. John Bonniwell, a sniper and Civil War veteran en route to a gold mine in Oregon, is in transit when he thwarts a Jesse James gang raid on the local bank. He kills three gang members and drives the others to flight, while himself, wounded by gunfire, ends up in the hospital. There, he is told that bank president Steve Barat had taken over the hospital costs for him. At the same time, he learns that Barat has gotten him elected sheriff of Broken Lance. John, who does not care about such a post, wants to cancel, but Eleanor Sager, who took care of him carefully in the hospital, changes his mind. The young woman is the owner of the only hotel in town. However, he quickly realizes that Steve Barat expects him to always act in his own way and to regard him as a compliant object of his machinations. In Broken Lance, Barat acts like its uncrowned king.

When he messes with Barat and makes it clear to him that he is unwilling to cover his dirty actions as an official, he realizes that this can amount to a life and death fight. The first trouble is already on the horizon when Barat charges an arbitrarily exorbitant fee, which the rancher John Wagoner is supposed to pay for driving his cattle across the banker's land. Although the herd owner has refused to pay, John has no intention of arresting him, as Barat requested.

When the Hatton gang raids town and starts a brawl in the Golden Prairie saloon, John arrests the gang members for causing disturbance. The next morning, however, they are free again, Barat has provided the bail. Shortly thereafter, Tom Wagoner is dead, the banker has hired the gang to murder him. While John is still investigating the circumstances that led to Tom's death, Barat fabricates a robbery on his own bank and persuades his brother Jeff to support him in his plan to discredit John. After John's return from the scene, he is informed of the mysterious bank robbery. At Eleanor's hotel, he meets Jeff with a suitcase and instinctively knows that something is wrong. However, he has no handle since Eleanor gives Jeff an alibi. When Eleanor confesses to Jeff that she loves John, Jeff gives himself a jerk and brings the suitcase with the money to John and admits his brother's plan. He does this because he genuinely loves Eleanor. When Steve finds out, he knows that the sheriff now has a real handle on him. However, he does not yet know that a telegram is on the way to Bonniwell stating that he has been charged with large-scale theft by the authorities in New York and that he has fled his arrest. Again, he turns to Gil Hatton, the head of the Hatton gang, who is supposed to raid the city with his gang and kill John. When Jeff learns of this plan, he issues a warning to John. John knows that the gang is using a certain bridge to get into town and has it undermined. His plan works, a large part of the gang is buried by the bursting bridge parts – Jeff is also killed in this action.

With the rest of the gang, who have entered the city by another route, a fierce battle ensues that ends with the death of their leader and finally breaks the gang's morale. John has yet to recover from his numerous wounds in the hospital while Barat has been extradited and awaits his punishment. When John hears music outside and wants to know from Eleanor what is being celebrated, she replies with a smile, in addition to the peace in Broken Lance, the people also celebrated their engagement.

== Cast ==
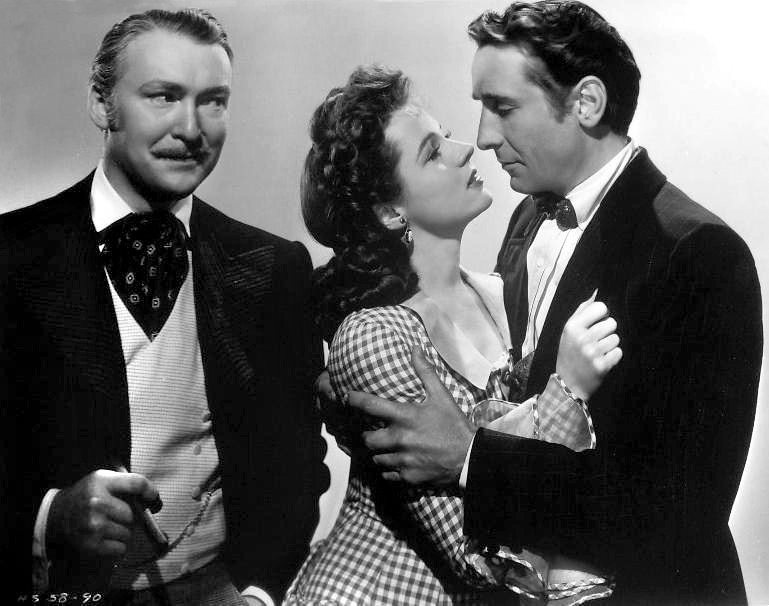
Albert Dekker, Jane Wyatt, and Victor Jory

- Richard Dix as John Bonniwell
- Jane Wyatt as Eleanor Sager
- Albert Dekker as Steve Barat
- Eugene Pallette as Tom Waggoner
- Victor Jory as Jeff Barat
- Robert Armstrong as Malachy
- Beryl Wallace as Soubrette
- Clem Bevans as Clem, the Bridge Tender
- Hobart Cavanaugh as Mayor Josh Hudkins
- Francis McDonald as Gil Hatton
- Willie Best as Bones
- Douglas Fowley as Ben Nash
- Rod Cameron as Kelso, Cowhand
- Eddy Waller as Ed Gilbert, Newspaper Editor
- Ray Bennett as Messenger
- Jason Robards Sr. as Bank Teller (uncredited)
- George Reeves as Jesse James (uncredited)
- Forrest Taylor as Doctor (uncredited)
- Jack Norton as Saloon Drunk (uncredited)

== Soundtrack ==
- The King's Men – "Lullaby of the Herd" (Lyrics by Foster Carling, music by Phil Ohman)

== Other information ==
- A clip of the bank robbery scenes from the beginning of the film is featured in the second episode of the 1966 Doctor Who serial The Tenth Planet.
