= Cherokee Strip (film) =

1940 film by Lesley Selander

- Theatrical release poster
- Directed by: Lesley Selander
- Screenplay by: Bernard McConville; Norman Houston
- Produced by: Harry Sherman
- Starring: Richard Dix; Florence Rice; William "Bill" Henry; Victor Jory; Andy Clyde; George E. Stone
- Cinematography: Russell Harlan
- Edited by: Carroll Lewis; Sherman A. Rose
- Music by: John Leipold; Albert Hay Malotte
- Production company: Harry Sherman Productions
- Distributed by: Paramount Pictures
- Release date: October 11, 1940
- Running time: 86 minutes
- Country: United States
- Language: English

Cherokee Strip, also known as Fighting Marshal or The Indian Nation, is a 1940 American Western film directed by Lesley Selander and written by Bernard McConville and Norman Houston. The film stars Richard Dix, Florence Rice, William "Bill" Henry, Victor Jory, Andy Clyde and George E. Stone. The film was released on October 11, 1940, by Paramount Pictures.

== Cast ==
- Richard Dix as Marshal Dave Lovell
- Florence Rice as Kate Cross
- William "Bill" Henry as Tom Cross
- Victor Jory as Coy Barrett
- Andy Clyde as Tex Crawford
- George E. Stone as Abe Gabbert
- Morris Ankrum as Hawk Barrett
- Douglas Fowley as Alf Barrett
- Addison Richards as Ned Strawn
- Tom Tyler as Frank Lovell
- Charles Trowbridge as Sen. Cross
- William Haade as Grimes
- Ray Teal as Smokey Lovell
- Hal Taliaferro as Ben Blivens
- Jack Rockwell as Ace Eastman
