= Texas Trail (1937 film) =

1937 film by David Selman

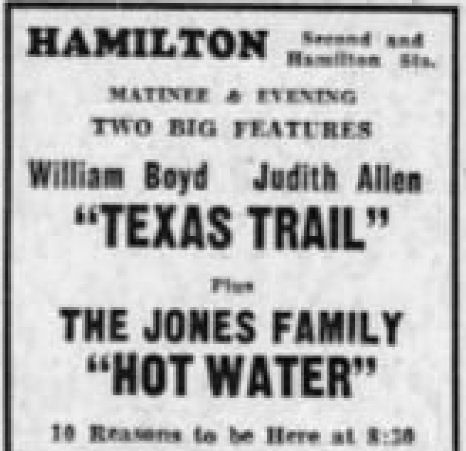
- Newspaper advertisement for the films Texas Trail (1937) and Hot Water (1937)
- Directed by: David Selman
- Screenplay by: Jack O'Donnell; Jack Mersereau
- Based on: Tex; 1922 novel by Clarence E. Mulford
- Produced by: Harry Sherman
- Starring: William Boyd; Russell Hayden; George "Gabby" Hayes
- Cinematography: Russell Harlan
- Edited by: Sherman A. Rose; Robert B. Warwick Jr.
- Music by: Hugo Friedhofer (uncredited)
- Production company: Paramount Pictures
- Distributed by: Paramount Pictures
- Release date: November 26, 1937
- Running time: 58 minutes
- Country: United States
- Language: English

Texas Trail is a 1937 American Western film directed by David Selman and starring William Boyd, Russell Hayden, and George "Gabby" Hayes.

Based on Clarence E. Mulford's 1922 novel, Tex, the film takes place during the Spanish–American War.

== Plot ==
Hopalong Cassidy (William Boyd) is asked by Major McCready (Karl Hackett) to round up 500 horses for government soldiers. Meanwhile, a gang of outlaws plot to steal the horses.

== Cast ==
- William Boyd as Hopalong Cassidy
- Russell Hayden as Lucky Jenkins
- George 'Gabby' Hayes as Windy Halliday
- Judith Allen as Barbara Allen
- Billy King as Boots McCready
- Alexander Cross as Black Jack Carson
- Karl Hackett as Major McCready
- Bob Kortman as Henchman Hawks
- Jack Rockwell as Henchman Shorty
- John Beach as Smokey
- Ray Bennett as Henchman Brad
- Philo McCullough as Jordan
- Ben Corbett as Fort Guard (uncredited)
- Earle Hodgins as Commanding Officer (uncredited)
