= Border Patrol (1943 film) =

1943 film by Lesley Selander

- Theatrical release poster
- Directed by: Lesley Selander
- Written by: Clarence E. Mulford; Michael Wilson
- Produced by: Harry Sherman
- Starring: William Boyd; Andy Clyde; Robert Mitchum; Jay Kirby; George Reeves; Duncan Renaldo
- Cinematography: Russell Harlan
- Edited by: Sherman A. Rose
- Distributed by: United Artists
- Release date: April 2, 1943
- Running time: 65 minutes
- Country: United States
- Language: English

Border Patrol is a 1943 Western film directed by Lesley Selander and written by Clarence E. Mulford and Michael Wilson. The film stars William Boyd, Andy Clyde, Robert Mitchum, Jay Kirby, George Reeves, and Duncan Renaldo. The film was released on April 2, 1943, by United Artists.

== Plot ==
Hopalong and his sidekicks are Texas Rangers who set out to find how 25 Mexicans have disappeared after being hired by the "Silver Bullets" mine. They ride into town and find that the mine owner is a one-man government, played by Russell Simpson as "Orestes Krebes." Hopalong and his friends are arrested on trumped-up charges and are tried before a kangaroo court and sentenced to swing but not until after lunch. With the help of the girl, they escape, free the captive mine workers and together defeat the evil gang.

== Cast ==
- William Boyd as Hopalong Cassidy
- Andy Clyde as California Carlson
- Jay Kirby as Johnny
- Russell Simpson as Orestes Krebs
- Claudia Drake as Inez La Barca
- George Reeves as Don Enrique Perez
- Duncan Renaldo as Commandant
- Pierce Lyden as Loren
- Robert Mitchum as Quinn (feature film debut, though released after other later films)
- Cliff Parkinson as Barton
