= Rustlers' Valley =

1937 film by Nate Watt

- Theatrical release poster
- Directed by: Nate Watt
- Screenplay by: Harry O. Hoyt
- Based on: Rustler's Valley; 1924 novel by Clarence E. Mulford
- Produced by: Harry Sherman
- Starring: William Boyd; George "Gabby" Hayes; Russell Hayden; Morris Ankrum; Muriel Evans; Lee J. Cobb
- Cinematography: Russell Harlan
- Edited by: Sherman A. Rose
- Music by: Lee Zahler
- Production company: Harry Sherman Productions
- Distributed by: Paramount Pictures
- Release date: July 23, 1937
- Running time: 61 minutes
- Country: United States
- Language: English

Rustlers' Valley is a 1937 American Western film directed by Nate Watt and written by Harry O. Hoyt. The film stars William Boyd, George "Gabby" Hayes, Russell Hayden, Morris Ankrum, Muriel Evans and Lee J. Cobb. The film was released on July 23, 1937, by Paramount Pictures.

== Cast ==
- William Boyd as Hopalong Cassidy
- George "Gabby" Hayes as Windy Halliday
- Russell Hayden as Lucky Jenkins
- Morris Ankrum as Glen Randall
- Muriel Evans as Agnes Randall
- Lee J. Cobb as Cal Howard (billed as Lee Colt)
- Ted Adams as Henchman Taggart
- Al Ferguson as Joe, Howard Henchman
- John Beach as Sheriff Boulton
- John St. Polis as Banker Crawford
