= Wide Open Town =

1941 film by Lesley Selander

- Theatrical release poster
- Directed by: Lesley Selander
- Screenplay by: Harrison Jacobs; J. Benton Cheney
- Produced by: Harry Sherman
- Starring: William Boyd; Russell Hayden; Andy Clyde; Evelyn Brent; Victor Jory; Morris Ankrum; Cara Williams
- Cinematography: Russell Harlan
- Edited by: Carroll Lewis
- Music by: John Leipold
- Production company: Harry Sherman Productions
- Distributed by: Paramount Pictures
- Release date: August 8, 1941
- Running time: 79 minutes
- Country: United States
- Language: English

Wide Open Town is a 1941 American Western film directed by Lesley Selander and written by Harrison Jacobs and J. Benton Cheney. The film stars William Boyd, Russell Hayden, Andy Clyde, Evelyn Brent, Victor Jory, Morris Ankrum and Cara Williams. The film was released on August 8, 1941, by Paramount Pictures.

This film marked Bernice Kay's feature film debut. She appeared in later films as Cara Williams.

== Plot ==
Hoppy along with Lucky and California are looking for their stolen cattle and arrive in a town run by outlaws led by Belle Langtry, after stopping the gang's attempt to damage the local printing business, Hoppy is made sheriff. Then Hoppy sets a trap to catch one of the rustlers, but lets him go with hope that he will lead Hoppy to the rest of the gang.

== Cast ==
- William Boyd as Hopalong Cassidy
- Russell Hayden as Lucky Jenkins
- Andy Clyde as California Carlson
- Evelyn Brent as Belle Langtry
- Victor Jory as Steve Fraser
- Morris Ankrum as Jim Stuart
- Cara Williams as Joan Stuart
- Kenneth Harlan as Tom Wilson
- Roy Barcroft as Henchman Red
- Glenn Strange as Henchman Ed Stark
- Ed Cassidy as Brad Jackson
- Jack Rockwell as Rancher

== Bibliography ==
- Fetrow, Alan G. Feature Films, 1940-1949: a United States Filmography. McFarland, 1994.
