= The Leather Burners =

1943 film by Joseph Henabery

- Theatrical release poster
- Directed by: Joseph Henabery
- Screenplay by: Jo Pagano
- Story by: Harry Sinclair Drago; Clarence E. Mulford (characters)
- Based on: The Leather Burners; 1940 book by Bliss Lomax
- Produced by: Harry Sherman
- Starring: William Boyd; Andy Clyde; Jay Kirby; Victor Jory; George Reeves; George Givot; Ellanora Needles (billed as Shelley Spencer)
- Cinematography: Russell Harlan
- Edited by: Carroll Lewis
- Music by: Samuel Kaylin
- Production company: Harry Sherman Productions
- Distributed by: United Artists
- Release date: May 28, 1943
- Running time: 58 minutes
- Country: United States
- Language: English

The Leather Burners is a 1943 American Western film directed by Joseph Henabery and written by Jo Pagano. The film stars William Boyd, Andy Clyde, Jay Kirby, Victor Jory, George Reeves, George Givot and Ellanora Needles (billed as Shelley Spencer). The film was released on May 28, 1943, by United Artists. The on-screen title is simply Leather Burners without the definite article.

== Plot ==
Bar 20 ranch hand Johnny Travers sends for old friends Hopalong Cassidy and California Carlson. Hopalong Cassidy immediately suspects mine company president Dan Slack to be behind the rustlings and decides to go undercover, with the assistance of Sharon Longstreet and her young brother Bobby.

== Cast ==
- William Boyd as Hopalong Cassidy
- Andy Clyde as California Carlson
- Jay Kirby as Johnny Travers
- Victor Jory as Dan Slack
- George Reeves as Harrison Brooke
- George Givot as Sam Bucktoe
- Shelley Spencer as Sharon Longstreet
- Bobby Larson as Bobby Longstreet
- Hal Taliaferro as Telegrapher Lafe
- Forbes Murray as Bart Gailey
- Robert Mitchum as Henchman Randall (Uncredited)
