= Hidden Gold (1940 film) =

1940 film

- Theatrical release poster
- Directed by: Lesley Selander
- Screenplay by: Gerald Geraghty; Jack Merserveau
- Produced by: Harry Sherman
- Starring: William Boyd; Russell Hayden; Minor Watson; Ruth Rogers; Britt Wood; Ethel Wales; Lee Phelps
- Cinematography: Russell Harlan
- Edited by: Carroll Lewis
- Music by: Irvin Talbot
- Production company: Harry Sherman Productions
- Distributed by: Paramount Pictures
- Release date: June 7, 1940
- Running time: 60 minutes
- Country: United States
- Language: English

Hidden Gold is a 1940 American Western film directed by Lesley Selander and written by Gerald Geraghty and Jack Merserveau. The film stars William Boyd, Russell Hayden, Minor Watson, Ruth Rogers, Britt Wood, Ethel Wales and Lee Phelps. The film was released on June 7, 1940, by Paramount Pictures.

== Cast ==
- William Boyd as Hopalong Cassidy
- Russell Hayden as Lucky Jenkins
- Minor Watson as Ed Colby
- Ruth Rogers as Jane Colby
- Britt Wood as Speedy
- Ethel Wales as Matilda Purdy
- Lee Phelps as Sheriff Cameron
- Roy Barcroft as Henchman Hendricks
- George Anderson as Ward Ackerman
- Eddie Dean as Logan
- Ray Bennett as Henchman Fleming
- Jack Rockwell as Stage Driver Pete
