= Harry Sherman =

American film producer (1884–1952)

- Born: November 5, 1884; Boston, Massachusetts, U.S.
- Died: September 25, 1952 (aged 67); Hollywood, California, U.S.
- Occupation: Film producer
- Children: Teddi Sherman

Harry "Pop" Sherman (November 5, 1884 – September 25, 1952) was an American film producer known for his work in the Western genre during the 1930s and 1940s. He introduced the character Hopalong Cassidy to the silver screen, and is the father of screenwriter Teddi Sherman.

== Biography ==
Born in Boston, Massachusetts, Sherman had an early love for film (Westerns in particular), working as a theater owner on the East Coast while starting his family. In 1913, while seeking movies to show at his theater, he traveled to Hollywood and met D.W. Griffith; Sherman ended up giving Griffith a loan for the money needed to complete Birth of a Nation.

Sherman arrived in Hollywood full-time in 1926, and worked at both Pathe and MGM before striking out on his own as an independent producer. He brought the popular Hopalong Cassidy character to the big screen in 1935, and would go on to produce 50+ more films in the series before turning duties over to Hopalong actor William Boyd. Sherman took pride in his clean-cut stories and righteous characters. He died in 1952 after entering the hospital for abdominal surgery.

== Selected filmography ==
- Four Faces West (1948)
- Ramrod (1947)
- Forty Thieves (1944)
- Mystery Man (1944)
- Lumberjack (1944)
- Buffalo Bill (1944)
- Texas Masquerade (1944)
- The Woman of the Town (1943)
- Riders of the Deadline (1943)
- False Colors (1943)
- Bar 20 (1943)
- The Kansan (1943)
- Colt Comrades (1943)
- Leather Burners (1943)
- Buckskin Frontier (1943)
- Border Patrol (1943)
- Hoppy Serves a Writ (1943)
- Lost Canyon (1942)
- American Empire (1943)
- Silver Queen (1942)
- Undercover Man (1942)
- Tombstone, the Town Too Tough to Die (1942)
- Secret of the Wastelands (1941)
- Outlaws of the Desert (1941)
- Twilight on the Trail (1941)
- Riders of the Timberline (1941)
- Stick to Your Guns (1941)
- Wide Open Town (1941)
- The Parson of Panamint (1941)
- Pirates on Horseback (1941)
- Border Vigilantes (1941)
- In Old Colorado (1941)
- The Roundup (1941)
- Doomed Caravan (1941)
- Three Men from Texas (1940)
- Cherokee Strip (1940)
- Stagecoach War (1940)
- Hidden Gold (1940)
- The Light of Western Stars (1940)
- The Showdown (1940)
- Knights of the Range (1940)
- Santa Fe Marshal (1940)
- The Llano Kid (1939)
- Law of the Pampas (1939)
- Range War (1939)
- Renegade Trail (1939)
- Heritage of the Desert (1939)
- Silver on the Sage (1939)
- The Frontiersman (1938)
- The Mysterious Rider (1938)
- In Old Mexico (1938)
- Sunset Trail (1938)
- Bar 20 Justice (1938)
- Heart of Arizona (1938)
- Cassidy of Bar 20 (1938)
- Partners of the Plains (1938)
- Texas Trail (1937)
- Hopalong Rides Again (1937)
- Rustlers' Valley (1937)
- North of the Rio Grande (1937)
- Hills of Old Wyoming (1937)
- The Barrier (1937)
- Borderland (1937)
- Trail Dust (1936)
- Hopalong Cassidy Returns (1936)
- Three on the Trail (1936)
- Call of the Prairie (1936)
- Heart of the West (1936)
- Bar 20 Rides Again (1935)
- The Eagle's Brood (1935)
- Hopalong Cassidy (1935)
