= Conquest of Cheyenne =

1946 film by R. G. Springsteen

- Theatrical release poster
- Directed by: R. G. Springsteen
- Screenplay by: Earle Snell
- Story by: Bert Horswell; Joseph F. Poland
- Produced by: Sidney Picker
- Starring: Wild Bill Elliott; Robert Blake; Alice Fleming; Peggy Stewart; Jay Kirby; Milton Kibbee
- Cinematography: William Bradford
- Edited by: Charles Craft
- Production company: Republic Pictures
- Distributed by: Republic Pictures
- Release date: July 29, 1946
- Running time: 56 minutes
- Country: United States
- Language: English

Conquest of Cheyenne is a 1946 American Western film in the Red Ryder film series directed by R. G. Springsteen and written by Earle Snell. The film stars Wild Bill Elliott, Robert Blake, Alice Fleming, Peggy Stewart, Jay Kirby, and Milton Kibbee. The film was released on July 29, 1946, by Republic Pictures.

== Plot ==
Red Ryder helps to bring in an oil well on a ranch owned by Jackson, after Tom Dean found oil in the ranch. However, Tuttle sets the well on fire in an effort to get the ranch foreclosed.

== Cast ==
- Wild Bill Elliott as Red Ryder
- Robert Blake as Little Beaver
- Alice Fleming as Duchess
- Peggy Stewart as Cheyenne Jackson
- Jay Kirby as Tom Dean
- Milton Kibbee as Banker Tuttle
- Tom London as Sheriff Dan Perkins
- Emmett Lynn as Daffy
- Kenne Duncan as Geologist McBride
- George Sherwood as Murdo
- Frank McCarroll as Henchman Long
- Jack Kirk as Deputy Blake
- Tom Chatterton as Rancher Jones
