= The Frontiersmen =

1938 film by Lesley Selander

- Theatrical release poster
- Directed by: Lesley Selander
- Screenplay by: Norman Houston; Harrison Jacobs
- Story by: Clarence E. Mulford
- Produced by: Harry Sherman
- Starring: William Boyd; George "Gabby" Hayes; Russell Hayden; Evelyn Venable
- Cinematography: Russell Harlan
- Edited by: Sherman A. Rose
- Music by: Gerard Carbonara; John Leipold
- Production company: Harry Sherman Productions
- Distributed by: Paramount Pictures
- Release date: December 16, 1938
- Running time: 74 minutes
- Country: United States
- Language: English

The Frontiersmen (sometimes erroneously labeled as The Frontiersman) is a 1938 American Western film directed by Lesley Selander and written by Norman Houston and Harrison Jacobs. The film stars William Boyd, George "Gabby" Hayes, Russell Hayden, Evelyn Venable, Charles Anthony Hughes, William Duncan, and Clara Kimball Young. The film was released on December 16, 1938, by Paramount Pictures.

== Plot ==
A beautiful new school teacher arrives in town and changes the lives of the residents there, while at the same time Hopalong Cassidy notices a loss of livestock at the Bar 20 ranch.

== Cast ==
- William Boyd as Hopalong Cassidy
- George "Gabby" Hayes as Windy Halliday
- Russell Hayden as Lucky Jenkins
- Evelyn Venable as June Lake
- Charles Anthony Hughes as Mayor Judson Thorpe
- William Duncan as Buck Peters
- Clara Kimball Young as Mrs. Amanda Peters
- Emily Fitzroy as Teacher that Quits
- Dickie Jones as Artie Peters
- John Beach as Henchman Quirt
- Roy Barcroft as Henchman Sutton
- The Robert Mitchell Boy Choir as The Crockett School's Chorus Boys
