= The Light of Western Stars (1940 film) =

1940 film by Lesley Selander

- Directed by: Lesley Selander
- Written by: Zane Grey (novel); Norman Houston (screenplay)
- Produced by: Joseph W. Engel (associate producer); Harry Sherman (producer)
- Starring: Victor Jory; Jo Ann Sayers; Russell Hayden; Morris Ankrum; Noah Beery, Jr.
- Cinematography: Russell Harlan
- Edited by: Sherman A. Rose
- Music by: Victor Young
- Distributed by: Paramount Pictures
- Release date: 1940
- Running time: 64 minutes
- Country: United States
- Language: English
- Budget: $606,810
- Box office: $1,190,622

The Light of Western Stars is a 1940 American Western film directed by Lesley Selander, starring Victor Jory as Gene Stewart, and based upon a 1914 novel by Zane Grey. The film is also known as Border Renegade (American alternative title). The supporting cast features Jo Ann Sayers, Russell Hayden, Morris Ankrum, Noah Beery Jr., Tom Tyler, and Alan Ladd.

That same year, another Zane Grey novel titled Knights of the Range was produced at the same studio with the same screenwriter, director, and much the same cast.

== Plot ==
In an 1848 bordertown saloon, Gene Stewart, an alcoholic ranch foreman, makes a drunken promise to marry the next available girl who comes to town. Then, Gene's friend Poco enters, announcing the arrival of a strange lady at the town's train station. As it happens, she has dozed off while waiting to meet someone. Minutes later, however, she is roused suddenly by the noisy arrival of Poco and Gene, with a minister in tow who speaks only Spanish. Thus, the woman has no idea she's about to be hitched to a rummy cowboy she's never met. Fortunately, Gene realizes just in time that the woman, who calls herself Madeline Hammond, is the sister of his best friend and workmate, Al Hammond. The ceremony is abruptly cancelled.

The next morning, Madeline awakens wearing the night clothes of a strange female, who introduces herself as Flo, her brother Al's fiancée. After raising a ruckus over her lost luggage, Madeline finally settles down when she is introduced to Gene, who by now has sobered up. Madeline finds herself vaguely attracted to the foreman. She also observes how happy her brother Al is whenever he is with Flo. Like Madeline, Al benefits from the enormous Hammond fortune. However, he has dedicated himself to ranching. Before long, Madeline quickly adapts to life in the Old West, a far cry from a life she has spent travelling throughout Europe's most attractive haunts.

These incidents provide the backdrop for this tale, weaving historical events from the nation's war with Mexico (occurring just across the border) along with Gene's abandoning of the ranch, his later drunken adventures south of the border, and Madeline's rescue of Gene from self-destruction. In time, she rehabilitates him, convincing him to return to life on the ranch—a life he has always loved the most.

== Cast ==
- Victor Jory as Gene Stewart
- Jo Ann Sayers as Madeline "Majesty" Hammond
- Russell Hayden as Alfred "Al" Hammond
- Morris Ankrum as Nat Hayworth
- Noah Beery, Jr. as Poco – Stewart's Sidekick
- J. Farrell MacDonald as Bill Stillwell – Rancher
- Ruth Rogers as Florence "Flo" Kingsley – Al's Girl
- Tom Tyler as Sheriff Tom Hawes
- Rad Robinson as Monty – Stilwell Ranch Hand
- Eddie Dean as Nels, Stillwell Hand
- Esther Estrella as Bonita – Adobe Saloon Girl
- Alan Ladd as Danny – Stillwell Ranch Hand
- Georgia Ellis as Helen – Majesty's Boston Pal
- Earl Askam as Sneed – Hawes' Deputy
- Lucio Villegas as Justice of the Peace Don Manuel
