= Dustine Farnum =

American film and radio actress

Dustine Farnum

Estelle "Dustine" Farnum (May 29, 1925 – December 10, 1983) was an American film and radio actor.

Farnum was born in Los Angeles in 1925, the daughter of silent film star Dustin Farnum, "the Clark Gable of the silent screen", and actress Winifred Kingston. Her father died when she was four, and her mother married oil executive Carman Runyon. For a time, Dustine used her step-father's name as Estelle Runyon. She attended Marlborough School for Girls in Los Angeles, and while there acted three nights a week in radio. In 1942 she starred in A Coat Tail by John Ward from Talent Showcase inc.

After graduation she began working in the movies, appearing in the Hopalong Cassidy film Bar 20 with William Boyd. Following this she moved to New York to work as a model with John Powers.

Farnum married schoolteacher Louis Juan Bitterlin on December 26, 1947.
