= 4 for Texas =

1963 film by Robert Aldrich

- Theatrical release poster
- Directed by: Robert Aldrich
- Written by: Teddi Sherman; Robert Aldrich
- Produced by: Robert Aldrich
- Starring: Frank Sinatra; Dean Martin; Anita Ekberg; Ursula Andress; Charles Bronson; Victor Buono; The Three Stooges
- Cinematography: Ernest Laszlo
- Edited by: Michael Luciano
- Music by: Nelson Riddle
- Color process: Technicolor
- Production company: The Sam Company
- Distributed by: Warner Bros. Pictures
- Release date: December 25, 1963
- Running time: 115 minutes
- Country: United States
- Language: English
- Budget: $4,520,000 or $5 million
- Box office: 1,367,490 admissions (France)

4 for Texas is a 1963 American comedy Western film starring Frank Sinatra, Dean Martin, Anita Ekberg and Ursula Andress, Charles Bronson and Mike Mazurki, with a cameo appearance by Arthur Godfrey and the Three Stooges. The film was written by Teddi Sherman and Robert Aldrich, who also directed.

== Plot ==
In 1870, Zack Thomas, Joe Jarrett, and an outlaw band headed by Matson try to claim a shipment of $100,000 from a stagecoach accident. Later, in Galveston, Thomas and Jarrett become rivals in a bid to open a waterfront casino. Each has a new romantic attachment, Thomas with Elya Carlson and Jarrett with Maxine Richter. They eventually must join forces to oppose Matson and corrupt banker Harvey Burden in order to keep their new gambling boat afloat.

== Cast ==
- Frank Sinatra as Zack Thomas
- Dean Martin as Joe Jarrett
- Anita Ekberg as Elya Carlson
- Ursula Andress as Maxine Richter
- Charles Bronson as Matson
- Victor Buono as Harvey Burden (President, Galveston Savings & Trust)
- Edric Connor as Prince George (carriage driver)
- Nick Dennis as Angel
- Richard Jaeckel as Pete Mancini
- Mike Mazurki as Chad (Zack's bodyguard)
- Wesley Addy as Winthrop Trowbridge
- Marjorie Bennett as Miss Emmaline
- Virginia Christine as Elya Carlson's maid
- Ellen Corby as Widow
- Jack Elam as Dobie
- Joe DeRita as Painting Deliveryman (billed as the Three Stooges)
- Larry Fine as Painting Deliveryman (billed as the Three Stooges)
- Moe Howard as Painting Deliveryman (billed as the Three Stooges)
- Jack Lambert as Monk
- Barbara Payton as Town Citizen (uncredited)

== Production ==
=== Development and writing ===
Robert Aldrich announced the film in November 1960 as Two for Texas, based on a script by Teddi Sherman. The proposed stars were Lisa Kirk, Martine Carol and Aldo Ray. Aldrich later said that he wrote the first draft of the script but "you could change that over and over and it was still a disaster." Eventually, Aldrich and Sherman shared the writing credit.

In January 1963, Dean Martin signed to star in the film. Warner Bros., which had just released Whatever Happened to Baby Jane? with Aldrich, agreed to finance. In March, Frank Sinatra agreed to costar. This meant the film would be a coproduction among Warner Bros., the Associates and Aldrich (Aldrich's company), Claude Productions (Martin's company) and Essex Productions (Sinatra's company). The film credited the Sam Company, Sinatra and Martin.

The producers had hoped to cast Gina Lollobrigida in a leading role, but she declined. At one stage, the role of Elya was intended for Sophia Loren, who had already worked with Sinatra in The Pride and the Passion. Although she was offered $1,000,000 for four weeks of work, Loren also declined. In May 1963, Ursula Andress joined the cast, and the film was retitled Four for Texas.

At one stage, Bette Davis was scheduled to make a cameo appearance. A role had also been written for Peter Lawford, but after Sinatra expelled Lawford from the Rat Pack, Lawford's role was excised.

=== Filming ===
Filming began in May 1963 in a 1.85:1 aspect ratio with color processed by Technicolor.

During production, the relationship between Sinatra and Aldrich became strained. Aldrich felt that the film was not a success and cited problems with his own script, as well as Sinatra's lack of enthusiasm for the project. Aldrich calculated that Sinatra worked a total of only 80 hours during 37 days of filming.

Among the film's props is an authentic black hearse that was reputed to have carried many corpses to Boot Hill cemetery in Dodge City, Kansas. According to legend, the hearse was named "Old Black Ben" by Wyatt Earp.

== Release ==
=== Theatrical ===
The film's promotional trailer features Andress in specially shot footage addressing the audience.

The film premiered on Christmas Day of 1963.

=== Home media ===
4 for Texas was first released on DVD on November 20, 2001. It was also included in a Rat Pack DVD collection released on June 13, 2006.

== Reception ==
In a contemporary review for The New York Times, critic Howard Thompson wrote, "Credit Messrs. Sinatra and Martin with knowing how to live it up on the screen, to the last diamond stickpin. The former behaves like a pasha, flanked by adoring handmaidens and servile flunkeys. The gorgeous, purring Miss Andress gravitates toward Mr. Martin, often like glue. In Amazonian contrast to the rather spindly Mr. Sinatra, Miss Ekberg, exquisitely sheathed in gowns of the period, all but spills over."

The film holds an 11% rating on Rotten Tomatoes, based on nine reviews.

=== Accolades ===
4 for Texas was nominated for the Golden Laurel award as Top Action Drama but placed fourth.
