= Colt Comrades =

1943 film by Lesley Selander

- Theatrical release poster
- Directed by: Lesley Selander
- Screenplay by: Michael Wilson
- Story by: Harry Sinclair Drago
- Produced by: Harry Sherman
- Starring: William Boyd; Andy Clyde; Jay Kirby; Teddi Sherman; Victor Jory; George Reeves; Douglas Fowley
- Cinematography: Russell Harlan
- Edited by: Fred W. Berger
- Music by: Paul Sawtell
- Production company: Harry Sherman Productions
- Distributed by: United Artists
- Release date: June 18, 1943
- Running time: 67 minutes
- Country: United States
- Language: English

Colt Comrades is a 1943 American Western film directed by Lesley Selander and written by Michael Wilson. The film stars William Boyd, Andy Clyde, Jay Kirby, Teddi Sherman, Victor Jory, George Reeves and Douglas Fowley. The film was released on June 18, 1943, by United Artists.

== Plot ==
Hoppy, Johnny Travers, and California Carlson purchase a 50% stake in the Whitlock ranch, which is owned by siblings Lin and Lucy Whitlock. The ranch is on the verge of foreclosure due to an unpaid water bill, a result of the exorbitant fees imposed by the local land baron, Jebb Hardin (played by Victor Jory). Hardin controls the valley’s water rights and dominates the cattleman’s association, making it nearly impossible for independent ranchers to survive.

Determined to build a future, Hoppy and his comrades resign from the U.S. Marshal Service and invest in the ranch. However, instead of paying the overdue water bill, California Carlson is persuaded by Wildcat Willy to invest in oil drilling, believing it could be a lucrative opportunity. This decision causes tension among the partners, as both groups fear they will lose the ranch.

As drilling progresses, the situation grows dire, and Hardin tightens his grip on the valley, using his influence to block alternative solutions. Just when hope seems lost, the drilling operation unexpectedly strikes water instead of oil. This discovery not only saves the ranch but also disrupts Hardin’s monopoly, restoring balance to the community.

== Cast ==
- William Boyd as Hopalong Cassidy
- Andy Clyde as California Carlson
- Jay Kirby as Johnny Travers
- Teddi Sherman (billed as Lois Sherman) as Lucy Whitlock
- Victor Jory as Jebb Hardin
- George Reeves as Lin Whitlock
- Douglas Fowley as Henchman Joe Brass
- Herbert Rawlinson as Rancher Varney
- Earle Hodgins as Wildcat Willie
- Robert Mitchum as Dirk Mason
