= Bar 20 =

1943 film

- Theatrical release poster
- Directed by: Lesley Selander
- Screenplay by: Morton Grant; Michael Wilson; Norman Houston
- Produced by: Harry Sherman
- Starring: William Boyd; Andy Clyde; George Reeves; Dustine Farnum; Victor Jory; Douglas Fowley; Betty Blythe; Robert Mitchum; Francis McDonald
- Cinematography: Russell Harlan
- Edited by: Carroll Lewis
- Production company: Harry Sherman Productions
- Distributed by: United Artists
- Release date: October 1, 1943
- Running time: 54 minutes
- Country: United States
- Language: English

Bar 20 is a 1943 American Western film directed by Lesley Selander and written by Morton Grant, Michael Wilson and Norman Houston. The film stars William Boyd, Andy Clyde, George Reeves, Dustine Farnum, Victor Jory, Douglas Fowley, Betty Blythe, Robert Mitchum and Francis McDonald. The film was released on October 1, 1943, by United Artists.

== Plot ==
Hopalong Cassidy and his sidekicks California Carlson and Lin Bradley leave their Bar 20 ranch for a cattle buy from the Stevens spread. Along the way, they encounter Mrs. Stevens, her daughter Marie and ranch hand Mark Jackson, whose stagecoach has been robbed by the Quirt Rankin gang.

Marie's stolen jewels are held for ransom and her sweetheart Richard Adams intends to raise the money. Jackson, secretly the boss of Quirt's gang, tries to swindle Richard out of his land and lends him cash that was Hoppy's cattle money before the robbery. He also kills Quirt.

Hoppy mistakenly believes Richard to be the thief and takes back the money. The honest Richard forms a posse that places Hoppy, California and Lin under arrest. A scheme to trap Jackson pays off, however, and once he is apprehended, all is well.

== Cast ==
- William Boyd as Hopalong Cassidy
- Andy Clyde as California Carlson
- George Reeves as Lin Bradley
- Dustine Farnum as Marie Stevens
- Victor Jory as Mark Jackson
- Douglas Fowley as Henchman Slash
- Betty Blythe as Mrs. Stevens
- Robert Mitchum as Richard Adams
- Francis McDonald as Quirt Rankin
- Earle Hodgins as Tom
