= Riders of the Deadline =

1943 film by Lesley Selander

- Theatrical release poster
- Directed by: Lesley Selander
- Screenplay by: Bennett Cohen
- Produced by: Harry Sherman
- Starring: William Boyd; Andy Clyde; Jimmy Rogers; Frances Woodward; Robert Mitchum; Richard Crane; Anthony Warde; William Halligan
- Cinematography: Russell Harlan
- Edited by: Walter Hannemann; Carroll Lewis
- Music by: Paul Sawtell
- Production company: Harry Sherman Productions
- Distributed by: United Artists
- Release date: December 3, 1943
- Running time: 70 minutes
- Country: United States
- Language: English

Riders of the Deadline is a 1943 American Western film directed by Lesley Selander and written by Bennett Cohen. The film stars William Boyd, Andy Clyde, Jimmy Rogers, Frances Woodward, Robert Mitchum, Richard Crane, Anthony Warde and William Halligan. The film was released on December 3, 1943, by United Artists.

== Plot ==
Texas Ranger Tim Mason (Richard Crane) is killed on the Mexican border for refusing to allow a wagonload of stolen goods to cross his land. Ranger Hopalong Cassidy (William Boyd) is accused of the murder, and goes undercover to help Tim's sister Sue (Frances Woodward), who is unaware that her barn is being used to store stolen goods.

== Cast ==
- William Boyd as Hopalong Cassidy
- Andy Clyde as California Carson
- Jimmy Rogers as Jimmy Rogers
- Frances Woodward as Sue Mason
- Robert Mitchum as Nick Drago
- Richard Crane as Tim Mason
- Anthony Warde as Gunner Madigan
- William Halligan as Banker Simon Crandall
- Hugh Prosser as Sheriff Gilcrest
- Herbert Rawlinson as Ranger Captain Jennings
- Jack Rockwell as Tex
- Earle Hodgins as Sourdough
- Montie Montana as Ranger Private Calhoun
