= Knights of the Range =

1940 film

- Directed by: Lesley Selander
- Screenplay by: Norman Houston
- Story by: Zane Grey
- Produced by: Harry Sherman
- Starring: Russell Hayden; Victor Jory; Jean Parker; Morris Ankrum; Britt Wood; J. Farrell MacDonald
- Cinematography: Russell Harlan
- Edited by: Carroll Lewis
- Music by: John Leipold; Victor Young
- Production company: Paramount Pictures
- Distributed by: Paramount Pictures
- Release date: February 23, 1940
- Running time: 70 minutes
- Country: United States
- Language: English

Knights of the Range is a 1940 American Western film directed by Lesley Selander and written by Norman Houston. The film stars Russell Hayden, Victor Jory, Jean Parker, Morris Ankrum, Britt Wood and J. Farrell MacDonald. The film was released on February 23, 1940, by Paramount Pictures.

== Cast ==
- Russell Hayden as Renn Frayne
- Victor Jory as Malcolm Lascalles
- Jean Parker as Holly Ripple
- Morris Ankrum as Gamecock
- Britt Wood as Laigs
- J. Farrell MacDonald as Cappy
- Ethel Wales as Aunt Myra Ripple
- Rad Robinson as Brazos Keene
- Ray Bennett as Henchman Heaver
- The King's Men as Singing Cowhands

== See also ==
The Light of Western Stars (1940)
