= Victor Jory =

Canadian-American actor (1902–1982)

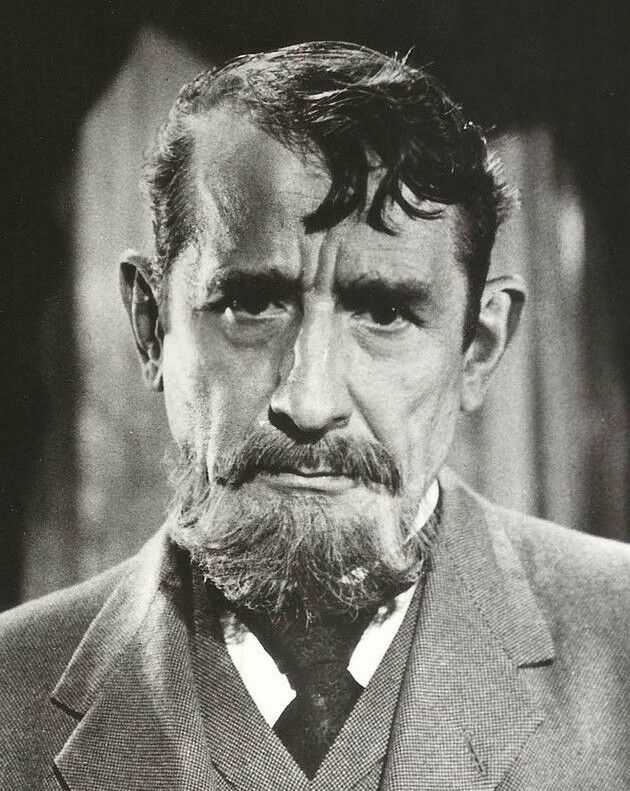
- Jory in The Miracle Worker
- Born: November 23, 1902; Dawson City, Yukon, Canada
- Died: February 12, 1982 (aged 79); Santa Monica, California, U.S.
- Occupation: Actor
- Years active: 1930–1980
- Spouse: Jean Inness (m. 1928; died 1978)
- Children: 2

Victor Jory (November 23, 1902 – February 12, 1982) was a Canadian-American actor of stage, film, and television. He initially played romantic leads, but later was mostly cast in villainous or sinister roles, such as Oberon in A Midsummer Night's Dream (1935) and carpetbagger Jonas Wilkerson in Gone with the Wind (1939). From 1959 to 1961, he had a lead role in the 78-episode television police drama Manhunt. He also recorded numerous stories for Peter Pan Records and was a guest star in dozens of television series as well as a supporting player in dozens of theatrical films, occasionally appearing as the leading man.

== Biography ==
Jory was born in Dawson City, Yukon, to American parents. He was the boxing and wrestling champion of the U.S. Coast Guard during his military service, and he kept his burly physique. He graduated from the Martha Oatman School of the Theater in Los Angeles.

Jory toured with theatre troupes, including a July 1929 appearance at Elitch Theatre in The Racket, by Bartlett Cormack. He appeared as a “guest star” in the role of the Assistant District Attorney. He went on to appear on Broadway, before making his Hollywood debut in 1930. He initially played romantic leads, but later was mostly cast as the villain, probably due to his distinctive, seemingly coal-black eyes that might be perceived as 'threatening'. He made over 150 films and dozens of TV episodes, as well as writing two plays. His long career in radio included starring in the series Dangerously Yours.

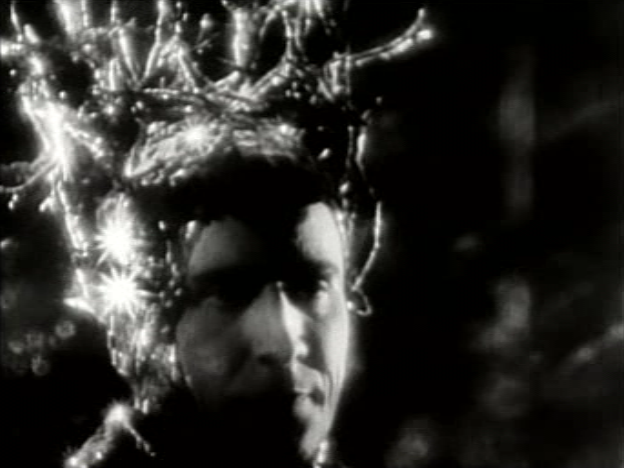
Victor Jory as Oberon in an outtake from the film A Midsummer Night's Dream (1935)

He is remembered for his roles as malevolent Injun Joe in The Adventures of Tom Sawyer (1938), Jonas Wilkerson, the opportunistic overseer of the slaves at Tara in Gone with the Wind, and as Lamont Cranston, or 'The Shadow', in the 1940 serial film The Shadow. He also portrayed Oberon in Max Reinhardt's film adaptation of Shakespeare's play A Midsummer Night's Dream (1935) starring James Cagney, Dick Powell and Olivia de Havilland.

He co-starred in seven Hopalong Cassidy films between 1941 and 1943, usually cast in the role of a villain with the exception of his role as a broad-shouldered lumberjack in the film Riders of the Timberline (1941).

He starred in the radio series Dangerously Yours beginning in mid-1944. The series was retitled Matinee Theater in October 1944 and ran through April 1945. Each episode was a dramatic reworking of famous literary works. The first episode dated July 2, 1944, was "The Highwayman", a dramatic interpretation of the Alfred Noyes poem.

In 1946, he narrated "Tubby the Tuba" for children, which was inducted in 2005 in the National Recording Registry and also introduces the orchestra to young listeners. The disc sold over one million copies. The story tells of a tuba who does not fit in. He also narrated "Bumpo the Ballerina", whose title character is an elephant.

From 1959 to 1961, he appeared with Patrick McVey in the 78-episode syndicated television police drama Manhunt. Jory played the lead role of Detective Lieutenant Howard Finucane. McVey was cast as police reporter Ben Andrews.

In 1957, Jory was cast in the role of the Southern Baptist pastor George Washington Truett of the First Baptist Church of Dallas, in the episode "Lone Star Preacher" of the syndicated religion anthology series Crossroads. In 1960 he portrayed the aging, malevolent husband of Anna Magnani’s character in The Fugitive Kind, adapted from a play by Tennessee Williams.

In 1962, he was cast as Deacon Lee in the two-part episode "Policemen Die Alone" of Leslie Nielsen's ABC crime drama The New Breed. That same year, Jory guest-starred as Mike Dahlback in the episode "Ride to a Fall" in the NBC modern Western series Empire, which featured Richard Egan as rancher Jim Redigo. He also played Helen Keller's father in The Miracle Worker, for which his co-stars Anne Bancroft and Patty Duke won Academy Awards.

In 1964, along with actresses Coleen Gray and Susan Seaforth, Jory testified before the United States Congress as part of "Project Prayer", arguing in favor of an amendment to the United States Constitution to restore school prayer, which the United States Supreme Court struck down in two decisions in 1962 and 1963.

Jory was on the faculty of the University of Utah, teaching acting in the Department of Theater. He endowed a scholarship for junior/senior students in the department known as the Victor Jory Scholarship, which continues to the current day.

The High Chaparral television episode "The Peacemaker" in 1968 featured Jory as a peace envoy attempting to negotiate a treaty with the Apache Native American chief Cochise.

In the private-eye series Mannix, which starred Mike Connors as the title character, Jory played the Armenian-American detective's widowed father, Stefan Mannix—a grape farmer in "Summer Grove", a fictitious town in California's Central Valley near Fresno (which continues to have a large Armenian population). He appeared in two episodes,"Return to Summer Grove" (1969) and "Wine from These Grapes" (1971).

In 1978, near the end of his career, Jory guest starred as an aging Federal Bureau of Investigation agent in James Garner's The Rockford Files episode "The Attractive Nuisance".

Jory died on February 12, 1982, at the age of 79, from a heart attack in Santa Monica, California.

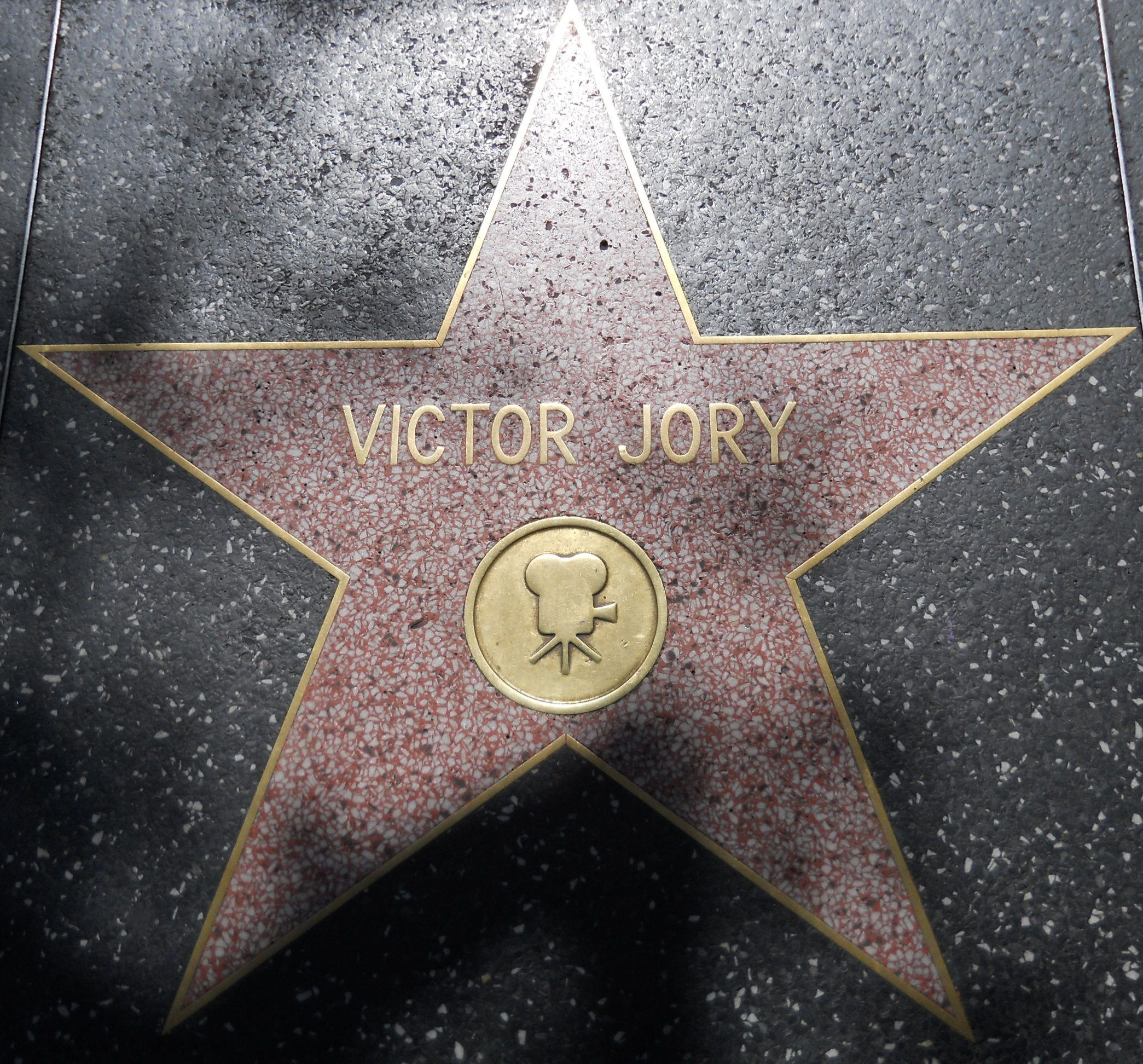
Jory's star on the Hollywood Walk of Fame at 6605 Hollywood Blvd

For his contribution to the motion-picture industry, Victor Jory was honored in 1960 with a star on the Hollywood Walk of Fame. His star is located at 6605 Hollywood Blvd.

== Family ==
Jory married actress Jean Inness in 1928. They had two children, Jon and Jean. Jon Jory headed the Actors Theater of Louisville, Kentucky, for 31 years, which he helped to build into one of America's most respected regional theater companies. He left the job in 2000 to become professor of drama at the University of Washington in Seattle. His daughter Jean Jory Anderson was a public-relations director of the theater department at Utah State University in Logan.

== Filmography ==
=== Film ===
Year	Title	Role	Notes
1930	Renegades	Officer Belonge	Uncredited
1932	The Pride of the Legion	Jerry Brewster	
1932	Handle with Care	1st Public Enemy	
1933	Second Hand Wife	Lotzi Vajda	
1933	State Fair	Hoop Toss Barker	
1933	Sailor's Luck	Baron Portola - aka Darrow	
1933	Infernal Machine	Alfred Doreen	
1933	Trick for Trick	La Tour	
1933	I Loved You Wednesday	Randall Williams	
1933	The Devil's in Love	Dr. Andre Morand / Paul Vernay	
1933	My Woman	John Bradley	
1933	Smoky	Clint Peters	
1934	I Believed in You	Jim Crowl	
1934	Murder in Trinidad	Howard Sutter	
1934	He Was Her Man	Nick Gardella	
1934	Madame Du Barry	Duc Armand d'Aiguillon	
1934	Pursued	Beauregard	
1934	Mills of the Gods	Jim Devlin	
1934	White Lies	Terry Condon	
1935	Party Wire	Matthew Putnam	
1935	Streamline Express	Jimmy Hart	
1935	A Midsummer Night's Dream	Oberon - King of the Fairies	
1935	Escape from Devil's Island	Dario	
1935	Too Tough to Kill	John O'Hara	
1936	Hell-Ship Morgan	Jim Allen	
1936	The King Steps Out	Captain Palfi	
1936	Meet Nero Wolfe	Claude Roberts	
1936	Rangle River	Dick Drake	Filmed in Australia
1937	Bulldog Drummond at Bay	Gregoroff	
1937	Glamorous Night	Baron Lyadeff	
1937	First Lady	Gordon Keane	
1938	The Adventures of Tom Sawyer	Injun Joe	
1939	Blackwell's Island	Commissioner Thomas MacNair	
1939	Wings of the Navy	Lieutenant Parsons	
1939	Dodge City	Yancey	
1939	Women in the Wind	Doc	
1939	Man of Conquest	William B. Travis	
1939	Susannah of the Mounties	Wolf Pelt	
1939	Each Dawn I Die	W. J. Grayce	
1939	I Stole a Million	Patian	
1939	Call a Messenger	Ed Hogan	
1939	Gone with the Wind	Jonas Wilkerson - Field Overseer	
1940	The Shadow	Lamont Cranston / The Shadow	
1940	Knights of the Range	Malcolm Lascalles	
1940	The Light of Western Stars	Gene Stewart	
1940	The Lone Wolf Meets a Lady	Clay Beaudine	
1940	River's End	Norman Talbot	
1940	Girl from Havana	Tex Moore	
1940	Cherokee Strip	Coy Barrett	Alternative title: The Indian Nation
1940	The Green Archer	Spike Holland	
1940	Give Us Wings	Mr. Arnold Carter	
1940	Lady with Red Hair	Mr. Clifton	
1941	Border Vigilantes	Henry Logan	
1941	Hoola Boola	Narrator	Voice, Short
1941	Bad Men of Missouri	William Merrick	
1941	Wide Open Town	Steve Fraser	
1941	Charlie Chan in Rio	Marana / Alfredo Cardozo	
1941	The Gay Knighties	Narrator	Voice, Short
1941	Riders of the Timberline	Baptiste Deschamp	
1941	The Stork Pays Off	Deak Foster	
1941	Secrets of the Lone Wolf	Dapper Dan Streever	
1942	Shut My Big Mouth	Buckskin Bill	
1942	Jasper and the Watermelons		Voice, Short
1942	Tombstone, the Town Too Tough to Die	Ike Clanton	
1942	Tulips Shall Grow	Narrator	Voice, Short
1943	Power of the Press	Oscar Trent	
1943	Hoppy Serves a Writ	Tom Jordan	
1943	Buckskin Frontier	Champ Clanton	
1943	The Leather Burners	Dan Slack	
1943	Colt Comrades	Jeb Hardin	
1943	The Kansan	Jeff Barat	
1943	Bar 20	Mark Jackson	
1943	The Unknown Guest	Charles 'Chuck' Williams	
1944	Jasper's Paradise		Voice, Short
1945	Hot Lips Jasper		Voice, Short
1945	Jasper Tell		Voice, Short
1947	Shoe Shine Jasper		Voice, Short
1947	Tubby the Tuba	Narrator	Short
1948	The Loves of Carmen	García	
1948	The Gallant Blade	Marshal of France Mordore	
1949	A Woman's Secret	Brook Matthews	
1949	South of St. Louis	Luke Cottrell	
1949	Canadian Pacific	Dirk Rourke	
1949	Fighting Man of the Plains	Dave Oldham	
1950	The Capture	Father Gomez	
1950	The Cariboo Trail	Frank Walsh	
1951	The Highwayman	Lord Douglas	
1951	Cave of Outlaws	Ben Cross	
1952	Flaming Feather	Lucky Lee / The Sidewinder	
1952	Son of Ali Baba	Caliph	
1952	Toughest Man in Arizona	Frank Girard	
1953	The Man from the Alamo	Jess Wade	
1953	Cat-Women of the Moon	Kip Reissner	
1954	Valley of the Kings	Tuareg Chief	
1954	Sabaka	Ashok	
1956	Manfish	'Professor' Walter Fenton	
1956	Blackjack Ketchum, Desperado	Jared Tetlow	
1956	Death of a Scoundrel	Leonard Wilson	
1957	The Man Who Turned to Stone	Dr. Murdock	
1957	The Last Stagecoach West	Rand McCord	
1958	Sierra Baron	Closing narrator	Uncredited
1960	The Fugitive Kind	Jabe M. Torrance	
1961	Operation Glen Canyon	Narrator	Documentary
1962	The Miracle Worker	Captain Arthur Keller	
1964	Cheyenne Autumn	Tall Tree	
1968	Jigsaw	Edward Arkroyd	
1969	Mackenna's Gold	The Narrator	
1969	A Time for Dying	Judge Roy Bean	
1970	Trail of the Hunter	Himself	Documentary
1970	Flap	Wounded Bear Mr. Smith (Attorney at Law)	Alternative title: The Last Warrior
1973	Frasier, the Sensuous Lion	Frasier's Voice	Voice
1973	Papillon	Indian Chief	
1975	The Boy Who Talks to Whales		
1977	Mission to Glory: A True Story	Father Zaya	
1980	The Mountain Men	Iron Belly	(final film role)
1987	The Puppetoon Movie		Voice

=== Television ===
Year	Title	Role	Notes
1950	The Chevrolet Tele-Theatre	Publisher	Episode: "Oropalo"
1950	The Philco Television Playhouse		Episode: "The Second Oldest Profession"
1950	Armstrong Circle Theatre		Episode: "The First Formal"
1950	Sure as Fate		Episode: "Child's Play"
1951	The Bigelow Theatre	College Professor	Episode: "The Sum of Seven"
1952	Tales of Tomorrow	Dr. Alden / Dr. Kramer	2 episodes
1952	Studio One	Dr. Kane / Interrogator / Gangster	3 episodes
1952–1953	Broadway Television Theatre	Manningham	2 episodes
1953	Medallion Theatre	Jean Valjean	Episode: "The Bishop's Candlesticks"
1953–1956	Schlitz Playhouse of Stars	Ferdie Shiff / Andrew Duquette	3 episodes
1954	Moby Dick	Captain Ahab	Television film
1954	General Electric Theater	Andrew Perry	Episode: "Exit for Margo"
1954	Pond's Theater	Merlin	Episode: "A Connecticut Yankee in King Arthur's Court"
1955	Producers' Showcase	Aristides Argamonte	Episode: "Yellow Jack"
1955	Warner Bros. Presents	Dr. Tower	Episode: "King's Row"
1955–1956	Kings Row	Dr. Tower	
1955–1957	Climax!	John Coulter / Sam Bellows / Robert	3 episodes
1956	TV Reader's Digest	Antonio Rosas / Movie Producer Stanley	2 episodes
1956	Science Fiction Theatre	Detective Lieutenant William Kiel	Episode: "The Flicker"
1956	Telephone Time	Stypulkowski	Episode: "I Am Not Alone"
1956	The Alcoa Hour	D'Alcala	Episode: "Key Largo"
1956–1957	Omnibus	Captain Kidd	2 episodes
1956–1957	Kraft Television Theatre	Joe Carpenter / Frankie Sorrano / Rancher / Everett	6 episodes
1956–1957	Matinee Theatre	Edward Hicks / Molara	4 episodes
1956–1959	Playhouse 90	George Bavister / Himself - Host / Captain Hume / Reverend Mr. Powell / Rear Admiral Batt	5 episodes
1957	Crossroads	Reverend George Truett	Episode: "Lone Star Preacher"
1957	The 20th Century Fox Hour	Major Kenniston	Episode: "The Still Trumpet"
1957	Ford Television Theatre	Harry Bond	Episode: "Moment of Decision"
1958	Studio 57	Jeweler	Episode: "The Queen's Bracelet"
1958	Johnny Belinda	Black McDonald	TV movie
1958	Target		Episode: "Counterfeit Coin"
1958	Pursuit	Cop	Episode: "The Silent Night"
1959	Wanted Dead or Alive	Sam McGarrett	Episode: "The Legend"
1959	The United States Steel Hour	Fernand	Episode: "Night of Betrayal"
1959–1961	Manhunt	Police Lieutenant Howard Finucane / Detective Lieutenant Howard Finucane	78 episodes
1959–1962	Rawhide	Hosea Brewer / Jess Hode	2 episodes
1962	Dr. Kildare	Dr. Oscar Whalen	Episode: "Oh, My Daughter"
1962	The New Breed	Deacon Lee	2 episodes
1962	Insight		Episode: "IOU, My Brother"
1962	The Untouchables	Arnold Stegler	Episode: "Element of Danger"
1962	87th Precinct	Mike Power	Episode: "The Last Stop"
1962	Empire	Mike Dahlback	Episode: "Ride to a Fall"
1963	Wide Country	Johnny Prewitt	Episode: "Step Over the Sky"
1963	The Alfred Hitchcock Hour	Detective Paul Reardon	Season 1 Episode 32: "Death of a Cop"
1963	Temple Houston	Claude Boley	Episode: "The Twisted Rope"
1964	The Great Adventure	Andrew Jackson	Episode: "The Testing of Sam Houston"
1964	Suspense	Sheriff	Episode: "I, Bradford Charles"
1964	Burke's Law	Jim Clover	Episode: "Who Killed Lenore Wingfield?"
1964	Profiles in Courage	Charles Carlin	Episode: "Oscar W. Underwood"
1964	The Farmer's Daughter	Sultan	Episode: "Big Sultan, Little Sultan"
1964–1969	The Virginian	Luke Nichols / Jim Kohler / Tom Brant / Carl Hendricks	5 episodes
1965	Gunsmoke	Chief Joseph	Episode: "Chief Joseph"
1965	Kraft Suspense Theatre	Conrad Easter	Episode: "That Time in Havana"
1965	Who Has Seen the Wind?	Peraltor	TV movie
1966	The Virginian	Tom Brant	Season 4, Episode 25: "Return of Golden Tom"
1966	Bonanza	Charles Ludlow	Episode: "Ride the Wind: Part 1"
1966	Hazel	Mr. Woods	Episode: "How to Find Work Without Really Trying"
1966	I Spy	Rafael Ortiz	Episode: "Return to Glory"
1966	The Loner	Old Man Ridley	Episode: "The Burden of the Badge"
1966	The Legend of Jesse James	Judge Parker	Episode: "Things Don't Just Happen"
1966	F Troop	Chief Mean Buffalo	Episode: "Indian Fever"
1966	The Green Hornet	Charles Delaclaire	Episode: "The Frog Is a Deadly Weapon"
1966	Iron Horse	Captain Anderson	Episode: "The Pride of the Bottom of the Barrel"
1967	The Road West	Collier	Episode: "Beyond the Hill"
1967	The Time Tunnel	Captain Beal	Episode: "Pirates of Deadman's Island"
1967	Voyage to the Bottom of the Sea	Dr. Turner	Episode: "Fires of Death"
1967	Ironside	Wally Stowe	Episode: "The Past Is Prologue"
1968	The High Chaparral	Mr. Kelly	Episode: "The Peacemaker"
1968	The Name of the Game	Victor Foss	Episode: "Witness"
1969–1971	Mannix	Stefan Mannix	2 episodes
1971	Longstreet	Fred Hornbeck	Episode: "So, Who's Fred Hornbeck?"
1972	Banacek	Paul Andros	Episode: "No Sign of the Cross"
1973	Circle of Fear	Old Man	Episode: "The Phantom of Herald Square"
1974	Nakia	Ben Redearth	3 episodes
1974	Kung Fu	Fred	Episode: "Cry of the Night Beast"
1974	McCloud	Joseph Rhigas	Episode: "The Concrete Jungle Caper"
1974	Kolchak: The Night Stalker	Charles Rolling Thunder	Episode: "Bad Medicine"
1975	Perilous Voyage	Dr. Henry Merrill	TV movie
1977	Quinn Martin's Tales of the Unexpected	Leon Davidian	Episode: "The Mask of Adonis"
1977	Alice	Billy 'The Scam' Williams	Episode: "The Indian Taker"
1978	The Rockford Files	Eddie LaSalle	Episode: "The Attractive Nuisance"
1978	Devil Dog: The Hound of Hell	Shaman	TV movie
1978–1979	Greatest Heroes of the Bible	Narrator / Horaz	15 episodes
1979	Grandpa Goes to Washington	Meyer Brockman	Episode: "The Union Boys"
1980	Young Maverick	Pony That Waits	Episode: "Makin' Tracks"
1980	Power	Hillman	TV movie

== Radio appearances ==
Year	Program	Episode/source
1953	Grand Central Station	Lost Year (with daughter Jean)
1957	Suspense	An Occurrence at Owl Creek Bridge
1959	Suspense	Death Notice
