= Stamp Day for Superman =

1954 film

- The full film
- Directed by: Thomas Carr
- Written by: David T. Chantler; Whitney Ellsworth; Jackson Gillis
- Based on: Characters by Jerry Siegel; Joe Shuster
- Produced by: Whitney Ellsworth
- Starring: George Reeves; Noel Neill
- Cinematography: Harold E. Stine
- Edited by: Harry W. Gerstad
- Production company: Superman Inc.
- Distributed by: U.S. Department of the Treasury
- Release date: 1954
- Running time: 18 minutes
- Country: United States
- Language: English

Stamp Day for Superman is a 1954 black-and-white short film in the superhero film genre. Starring George Reeves as Superman and Noel Neill as Lois Lane, it was produced by Superman Inc. for the United States Department of the Treasury to promote the purchase of U.S. Savings Bonds. Never shown theatrically, it was distributed to schools as a means of educating children about the program.

Warner Bros. also released the film as part of the Adventures of Superman Season 2 DVD set. It was a featured short and riffed on by the former cast members of Mystery Science Theater 3000 during the RiffTrax Live MST3K Reunion Show on June 28, 2016.

== Plot ==
When Lois and Clark come upon a robbery while shopping, Superman apprehends the burglar, who claims to have to steal because he never bothered to save his money.

== Cast ==
- George Reeves as Clark Kent / Superman
- Noel Neill as Lois Lane
- Jack Larson as Jimmy Olsen
- John Hamilton as Perry White
- Tris Coffin as Principal Garwood
- Billy Nelson as Blinky

== See also ==
- List of films in the public domain in the United States
