= Partners of the Sunset =

Film directed by Lambert Hillyer

- Theatrical release poster
- Directed by: Lambert Hillyer
- Screenplay by: J. Benton Cheney
- Produced by: Louis Gray
- Starring: Jimmy Wakely; Dub Taylor; Christine Larson; Steve Darrell; Marshall Reed; Jay Kirby
- Cinematography: Harry Neumann
- Edited by: John C. Fuller
- Production company: Monogram Pictures
- Distributed by: Monogram Pictures
- Release date: May 6, 1948
- Running time: 53 minutes
- Country: United States
- Language: English

Partners of the Sunset is a 1948 American Western film directed by Lambert Hillyer and written by J. Benton Cheney. The film stars Jimmy Wakely, Dub Taylor, Christine Larson, Steve Darrell, Marshall Reed, and Jay Kirby. The film was released on May 6, 1948, by Monogram Pictures.

== Cast ==
- Jimmy Wakely as Jimmy Wakely
- Dub Taylor as Cannonball
- Christine Larson as Janice Thompson
- Steve Darrell as Bill Thompson
- Marshall Reed as Kirk Danvers
- Jay Kirby as Dan Thompson
- Leonard Penn as Les
- J.C. Lytton as Town Marshal
- Bob Woodward as Deputy Bob
- Carl Mathews as Spike
- Carl Sepulveda as Hashknife
