= Hoppy Serves a Writ =

1943 film by George Archainbaud

- Theatrical release poster
- Directed by: George Archainbaud
- Screenplay by: Gerald Geraghty
- Produced by: Harry Sherman
- Starring: William Boyd; Andy Clyde; Jay Kirby; Victor Jory; George Reeves; Jan Christy
- Cinematography: Russell Harlan
- Edited by: Sherman A. Rose
- Production company: Harry Sherman Productions
- Distributed by: United Artists
- Release date: March 12, 1943
- Running time: 67 minutes
- Country: United States
- Language: English

Hoppy Serves a Writ is a 1943 Western film directed by George Archainbaud and starring William Boyd as Hopalong Cassidy, the 43rd of 66 Cassidy features. The supporting cast features his regular sidekicks Andy Clyde and Jay Kirby, as well as Victor Jory and George Reeves. The film remains noteworthy today as one of the earliest screen performances (his 3rd) of unshaven newcomer Robert Mitchum, who made an impression upon the studio by generating a surprising fan mail response exactly as Clark Gable had after playing an extremely similar unshaven role in The Painted Desert, a Western starring William Boyd produced a dozen years earlier.

== Plot ==
Cattle rustler and stagecoach hold-up man Tom Jordan and his gang have been terrorizing the ranchers and other citizens of Mason City. Sheriff Hoppy is implored to bring them to justice, but their hideout is across the border in Oklahoma, outside his jurisdiction. With somewhat questionable help from sidekicks California and Johnny, he has to figure out a way to capture and arrest Jordan and his henchmen while they're committing crimes in Texas.

It was adapted from "Hopalong Cassidy Serves a Writ" (1941), the final Cassidy novel written by creator Clarence E. Mulford.

== Cast ==
- William Boyd as Hopalong Cassidy
- Andy Clyde as California Carlson
- Jay Kirby as Johnny Travers
- Victor Jory as Tom Jordan
- George Reeves as Steve Jordan
- Jan Christy as Jean Hollister
- Hal Taliaferro as Henchman Greg Jordan
- Forbes Murray as Ben Hollister
- Robert Mitchum as Henchman
- Byron Foulger as Danvers
- Earle Hodgins as Bartender, Desk Clerk
- Roy Barcroft as Rancher Tod Colby
