= Jay Kirby =

American Actor

Jay Kirby (born William Bennett George, January 28, 1920 – July 30, 1964) was an American actor in films and television. He was best known for playing Johnny Travers, the youthful sidekick of Hopalong Cassidy in six films in the 1940s.

In 1948, he and his wife Carmelle George were divorced and the custody of their one-year-old son was given to his wife.

== Career ==
Kirby was born in Kansas City, Missouri. He began acting in films in 1942, when he was cast to replace Russell Hayden as the boyish partner to cowboy hero Hopalong Cassidy. He was an aviation cadet in the U.S. Army Air Forces during World War II but does not appear to have served long, as his screen appearances are continuous throughout the war and afterward for several years. In 1949 he reverted to his real name, Bill George, for his last feature film and his subsequent television roles. He died at 44 and was buried in the Los Angeles National Cemetery.

== Filmography ==
Year	Title	Role	Notes
1942	Undercover Man	Breezy Travers	
1942	Lost Canyon	Johnny Travers	
1943	Hoppy Serves a Writ	Johnny Travers	
1943	Border Patrol	Texas Ranger Johnny	
1943	The Leather Burners	Johnny Travers	
1943	Colt Comrades	Johnny Travers	
1944	Marshal of Reno	Danny Boyd	
1944	Zorro's Black Whip	Randolph Meredith	Serial, [Ch.1]
1944	Sheriff of Las Vegas	Tom Blackwell	
1944	Sundown Riders	Jay Kirby	
1945	Rockin' in the Rockies	Rusty Williams	
1945	Wagon Wheels Westward	Bob Adams	
1946	Days of Buffalo Bill	Jim Owens	
1946	King of the Forest Rangers	Hale - Forest Ranger at Assayer's Office	Serial, [Ch. 11], Uncredited
1946	Conquest of Cheyenne	Tom Dean	
1947	Bells of San Angelo	Rider	Uncredited
1948	Oklahoma Badlands	Ken Rawlins	
1948	Partners of the Sunset	Dan Thompson	
1948	Son of God's Country	Frank Thornton	
1949	Masked Raiders	Luke Trevitt	

He starred in an episode of The Cisco Kid.
