= False Colors (1943 film) =

1943 film by George Archainbaud

- Theatrical release poster
- Directed by: George Archainbaud
- Screenplay by: Bennett Cohen
- Produced by: Harry Sherman
- Starring: William Boyd; Andy Clyde; Jimmy Rogers; Douglass Dumbrille; Tom Seidel; Claudia Drake; Robert Mitchum
- Cinematography: Russell Harlan
- Edited by: Fred W. Berger
- Music by: Paul Sawtell
- Production company: Harry Sherman Productions
- Distributed by: United Artists
- Release date: November 5, 1943
- Running time: 65 minutes
- Country: United States
- Language: English

False Colors is a 1943 American Western film directed by George Archainbaud and written by Morton Grant, Michael Wilson and Norman Houston. The film stars William Boyd, Andy Clyde, Jimmy Rogers, Douglass Dumbrille, Tom Seidel, Claudia Drake and Robert Mitchum. The film was released on November 5, 1943, by United Artists.

== Plot ==
A Bar 20 cowboy is killed soon after inheriting a ranch. Hopalong Cassidy goes to look over the land and help the murdered man's sister. Hoppy discovers that a crooked banker is out to steal the ranch.

== Cast ==
- William Boyd as Hopalong Cassidy
- Andy Clyde as California Carlson
- Jimmy Rogers as Jimmy Rogers
- Douglass Dumbrille as Mark Foster
- Tom Seidel as Bud Lawton / Kit Moyer
- Claudia Drake as Faith Lawton
- Robert Mitchum as Henchman Rip Austin
- Glenn Strange as Henchman Sonora
- Pierce Lyden as Henchman Lefty
- Roy Barcroft as Sheriff Clem Martin
