= Teddi Sherman =

American actress and writer (1921–2019)

- Born: Theodora Lois Sherman; April 1, 1921; Minneapolis, Minnesota, US
- Died: January 16, 2019 (aged 97); Los Angeles, California, US
- Other names: Lois Sherman; Gayle Lord
- Occupation(s): Actress, screenwriter, TV writer
- Spouse: Allan Baylin (div.)
- Children: 1
- Father: Harry Sherman

Theodora Lois Sherman (sometimes credited as Lois Sherman; stage name, Gayle Lord; April 1, 1921 – January 16, 2019) was an American actress, TV writer, and screenwriter known for her work in the Western genre.

== Biography ==
Theodora Lois Sherman was born in Minneapolis, Minnesota, to Harry Sherman and Lillian Mazur. She spent her childhood traveling the country, and eventually went to a finishing school on the East Coast. Afterward, she studied acting at the Pasadena Playhouse for four years.

In the early 1940s, she arrived in Hollywood. Her father had become a successful producer, known for Hopalong Cassidy films. Not wanting to capitalize off his name, she used the stage name of Gayle Lord.

While her father was out of town, she auditioned for a role on a Hopalong Cassidy. When she got the part, her father insisted she use her real name.

She appeared in a few films her father produced and was popular as an actress, but found she enjoyed writing. In 1946, she was named assistant story editor at her father's independent production studio, Enterprise Pictures, where she wrote half a dozen Westerns (including the Gary Cooper film) as well as dozens of television episodes. She collaborated on several scripts with writer Graham Baker.

She was reportedly engaged to actor Rod Cameron at one point in the early '40s, but that never led to marriage. She was also engaged to her father's assistant, Vernon Clark, in the late '40s, but that was called off. In 1957, she married Allan Baylin. The pair had a daughter together.

Sherman died on January 16, 2019, at the age of 97 due to natural causes.

== Selected filmography ==
Film:

- Rage (1966)
- 4 for Texas (1963)
- 10 Seconds to Hell (1959)
- Tennessee's Partner (1955)
- The Man from Bitter Ridge (1955)
- Four Faces West (1948)
- The Woman of the Town (1943)
- Colt Comrades (1943)

TV:

- Then Came Bronson (1 episode; 1970)
- Mannix (1 episode; 1968)
- The Rounders (1 episode; 1966)
- The One Who Never Was (2 episodes; 1966)
- Ben Casey (3 episodes; 1962–1966)
- Wagon Train (1 episode; 1964)
- Ripcord (3 episodes; 1962–1963)
- The Virginian (3 episodes; 1961–1962)
- Everglades (3 episodes; 1961–1962)
- The Roaring 20's (1 episode; 1961)
- Bat Masterson (1 episode; 1960)
- Lock-Up (1 episode; 1960)
- Sea Hunt (4 episodes; 1960)
- The Rifleman (2 episodes; 1959–1960)
- Tombstone Territory (2 episodes; 1960)
- Johnny Ringo (1 episode; 1960)
- Law of the Plainsman (1 episode; 1960)
- The Rough Riders (3 episodes; 1958–1959)
- The Millionaire (1 episode; 1958)
- Cheyenne (1 episode; 1958)
- Highway Patrol (2 episodes; 1957
