= Clarence E. Mulford =

American writer (1883–1956)

- Born: Clarence Edward Mulford; 3 February 1883; Streator, Illinois, United States
- Died: 10 May 1956 (aged 73); Portland, Maine, United States
- Occupation: Writer
- Known for: Hopalong Cassidy

Clarence Edward Mulford (3 February 1883 – 10 May 1956) was an American writer, best known as the creator of the character Hopalong Cassidy.

== Biography ==
Mulford was born in Streator, Illinois. He created Hopalong Cassidy in 1904 while living in Fryeburg, Maine, and the many short stories and 28 novels were adapted to radio, feature film, television, and comic books, often deviating significantly from the original stories, especially in the character's traits. While many of his stories depicted Cassidy and other men of the Bar-20 ranch, he also wrote novels (and short stories) of other Westerners.

More than just writing a very popular series of Westerns, Mulford recreated an entire detailed and authentic world filled with characters drawn from his extensive library research. His biographer, Francis Nevins, characterized Mulford's writing as "rooted in Victorian convention." Nevins also states that he originated the Western series that has continuous characters, and that, unlike the characters of most later Western series writers, his characters aged.

He died of complications from surgery in Portland, Maine. He set aside much of his money from his books for local charities.

== Works ==
=== Hopalong Cassidy novels ===
- Bar-20 (1906)
- The Orphan (1908)
- Hopalong Cassidy (1910)
- Bar-20 Days (1911)
- Buck Peters, Ranchman (1912)
- The Coming of Cassidy (1913)
- The Man from Bar-20 (1918)
- Johnny Nelson (1920)
- The Bar-20 Three (1921)
- Tex (1922)
- Bring Me His Ears (1922)
- H. C. Returns (1923)
- Black Buttes (1923)
- Rustler's Valley (1924)
- Cottonwood Gulch (1925)
- Hopalong Cassidy's Protege (1926)
- The Bar-20 Rides Again (1926)
- Corson of the J.C. (1928)
- Mesquite Jenkins (1928)
- Me an' Shorty (1929)
- The Deputy Sheriff (1930)
- Hopalong Cassidy and the Eagles Brood (1931)
- Mesquite Jenkins, Tumbleweed (1932)
- The Round-Up (1933)
- Trail Dust (1934)
- On the Trail of the Tumbling T (1935)
- Hopalong Cassidy Takes Cards (1937)
- Hopalong Cassidy Serves a Writ (1941)
