= Russell Harlan =

American cinematographer

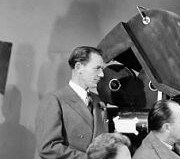
Harlan on the set of American Empire (1942)

Russell B. Harlan, A.S.C. (September 16, 1903 – February 28, 1974) was an American cinematographer.

== Biography ==
Born in Los Angeles, California, Russell Harlan witnessed the city's development from the construction of its first film studio to being the center for motion picture production in the United States. Harlan embarked on a career in film as an actor and stuntman but by the early 1930s was pursuing his interest behind the camera as an assistant. He performed as the cinematographer for the first time in 1937 on a Hopalong Cassidy western film that led to a career spanning more than thirty years. He received six nominations for the Academy Award for Best Cinematography, including two in 1962 alone when he worked on Hatari! and To Kill a Mockingbird.

Russell Harlan died in 1974 in Newport Beach, California and was interred in Forest Lawn Memorial Park Cemetery in Glendale, California.

== Selected filmography ==
- North of the Rio Grande (1937)
- Texas Trail (1937)
- The Frontiersmen (1938)
- Heritage of the Desert (1939)
- The Light of Western Stars (1940)
- Doomed Caravan (1941)
- In Old Colorado (1941)
- American Empire (1942)
- Hoppy Serves a Writ (1943)
- False Colors (1943)
- Mystery Man (1944)
- A Walk in the Sun (1945)
- Ramrod (1947)
- Red River (1948)
- Gun Crazy (1949)
- Guilty Bystander (1950)
- The Thing from Another World (1951)
- The Big Sky (1952)
- Riot in Cell Block 11 (1954)
- Blackboard Jungle (1955)
- The Last Hunt (1956)
- Lust for Life (1956)
- Witness for the Prosecution (1957)
- Run Silent, Run Deep (1958)
- King Creole (1958)
- Rio Bravo (1959)
- Operation Petticoat (1959)
- Sunrise at Campobello (1960)
- Pollyanna (1960)
- To Kill a Mockingbird (1962)
- Hatari! (1962)
- A Gathering of Eagles (1963)
- Dear Heart (1964)
- The Great Race (1965)
- Hawaii (1966)
- Tobruk (1967)
- Darling Lili (1970)
