= Bigot (surname) =

Bigot (English: /biːˈɡoʊ/, French: [biɡo]) is a French surname. Notable people with the name include:

- Alexandre Bigot (1862–1927), French ceramicist
- Antoine Bigot (1825–1897), French writer, poet, and translator in Occitan
- Bernard Bigot (1950–2022), French physicist and chemist
- Christophe Bigot (born 1965), French diplomat
- Claude Bigot de Sainte-Croix (1744–1803), French Foreign Minister
- Eugène Bigot (1888–1965), French composer and conductor
- François Bigot (1703–1778), French government official
- François Bigot (royal notary) (1643–1708), notary royal of New France
- Fred Bigot, French musician better known as Electronicat
- Georges Ferdinand Bigot (1860–1927), French cartoonist, illustrator and artist
- Guillaume Bigot (1502– c. 1550), French writer, doctor, and poet
- Jacques Bigot (Jesuit) (1651–1711), French Jesuit priest and missionary in Canada
- Jacques Bigot (politician) (born 1952), French politician
- Jacques Marie François Bigot (1818–1893), French naturalist and entomologist
- Joseph Bigot (1807–1894), French architect
- Jules Bigot (1915–2007), French footballer
- Manon Bigot (born 1990), French rugby union player
- Marie Bigot (1786–1820), French musician and composer
- Marthe Bigot (1878–1962), French schoolteacher, feminist, pacifist, and communist
- Paul Bigot (1870–1942), French architect
- Pierre-Marie Bigot (1909–2008), French Air Force general
- Quentin Bigot (born 1992), French athlete
- Sébastien-François Bigot (1706–1781), French soldier, sailor and naval tactician
- Trophime Bigot (1579–1650), French Baroque painter
- Vincent Bigot (1649–1720), French Jesuit priest and missionary in Canada

== See also ==
- Félix-Julien-Jean Bigot de Préameneu (1747–1825), French jurist
- BIGOT list, a list of personnel possessing appropriate security clearance
