= Elyesa Bazna =

Secret agent for Nazi Germany during World War II, operating under the code name Cicero

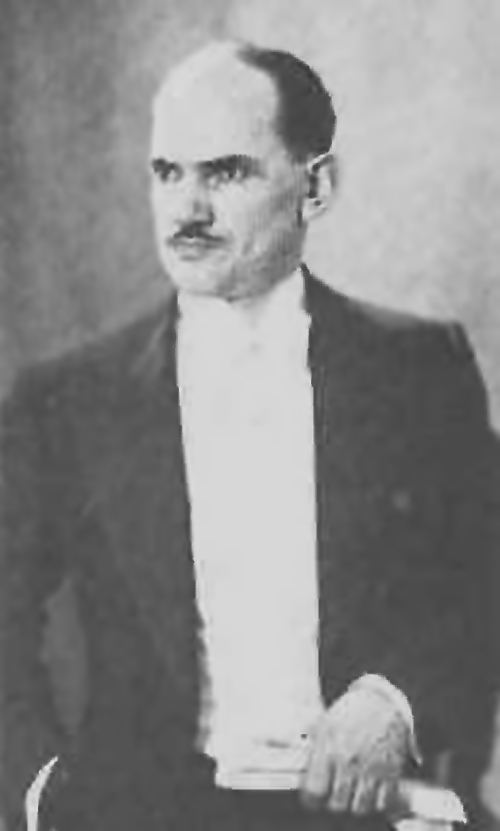
- Born: 28 July 1904; Pristina, Kosovo Vilayet, Ottoman Empire (now Kosovo)
- Died: 21 December 1970 (aged 66); Munich, West Germany
- Resting place: Friedhof am Perlacher Forst, Munich, Germany
- Other name: Cicero
- Known for: Espionage for Nazi Germany
- Father: Hafiz Yazan Bazna
- Relatives: Major General Kemal (uncle)

Elyesa Bazna (Turkish: [ˈeljesa ˈbazna]), sometimes known as Iljas, Ilyaz and Iliaz Bazna (Albanian: [iljas bazna]; 28 July 1904 – 21 December 1970), was a secret agent for Nazi Germany during World War II, operating under the code name Cicero.

In 1943, Bazna was hired as a valet by Hughe Knatchbull-Hugessen, the British ambassador in Ankara, Turkey. He photographed British documents in Knatchbull-Hugessen's possession, and sold them to the Germans through their attaché Ludwig Carl Moyzisch in what became known as the Cicero affair.

As Cicero, Bazna passed on important information about many of the Allied leaders' conferences, including the Moscow, Tehran and Cairo Conferences.

Bazna had also conveyed a document that carried the highest security restriction (BIGOT list) about Operation Overlord (the code name for the Invasion of Normandy in June 1944). It included intelligence that the British ambassador was to request the use of Turkish air bases "to maintain a threat to the Germans from the eastern Mediterranean until Overlord is launched." The information about the Normandy Invasion was not known by the Germans until after the war. Had it been provided in time, Operation Overlord (the preparations for D-Day) would have been compromised. He also provided intelligence that might have made the Germans believe that there was no danger of attack in the Balkans.

The information that he leaked is believed to have been among the more damaging disclosures made by an agent during WWII. The German Foreign Office questioned the reliability of the intelligence provided by Cicero due to the large quantity of transmitted documents, which meant that apparently little, if any, of it was acted upon. It seems likely that he had received some intelligence training from the Italian secret intelligence service, SIM. This would explain much, for as Wilfred Dunderdale later stated, "We always thought Cicero was an Italian agent because of his modus operandi - they gave their agents special training in locksmithery and in infiltrating diplomatic households."

After the war, Bazna lived in Ankara with his family for many years and obtained work doing odd jobs. Much of the money the Germans had paid him was revealed to be counterfeit. He moved to Munich in 1960 and worked as a night watchman before dying in 1970 of kidney disease. In 1962, Bazna published a memoir about the Cicero affair.

== Early life and family ==
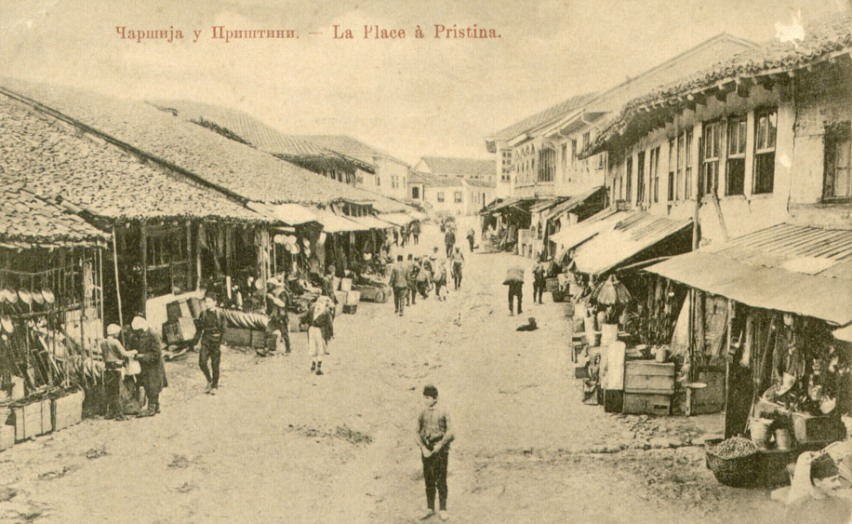
Pristina around the turn of the century

Bazna was born in 1904 in Pristina, Kosovo Vilayet, Ottoman Empire (now Kosovo). His parents were of Albanian heritage. His father was a teacher of Islamic doctrine and a landowner. He later stated that his father was a Muslim mullah named Hafiz Yazan Bazna, one of his uncles was Major General Kemal. His grandfather was Tahir Pasha the Brave. Both his grandfather and uncle were Young Turks who served under Mustafa Kemal Atatürk.

When he was 14, Serb forces captured Bazna's birthplace and his family relocated during the defeat and dissolution of the Ottoman Empire to Istanbul, which was then occupied by British, French, Italian and American Allied forces of World War I. The Turkish nationalists opposed the occupying forces.

According to Bazna, he attended a military academy in Fatih, Turkey, before 1919. At age 16 he joined a French military unit in Istanbul. He claimed to have stolen British weapons and cars for the Turkish National Movement, which was led by Atatürk.

Richard Wires, author of Cicero, stated that Bazna was not motivated to steal for political or patriotic reasons. When he was caught stealing he was sent to a penal labor camp in Marseille, France, for three years. He reportedly worked at the Berliet motor company after he left the labor camp. While there, he learned locksmithing skills.

In 1925, Bazna moved to Istanbul, where he worked for the Istanbul Corp. in the transportation department. He then worked as a fire brigade chief in Yozgat before returning to Istanbul to drive taxis.

Bazna spoke Albanian, Turkish, Serbo-Croatian, and French, the latter of which was the standard language of diplomacy at that time. He knew a little German from singing Lieder and said that he could read basic English but had difficulty speaking it. He was trained as an opera singer.

Bazna married twice; with his first wife, whom he later divorced, he had four children. He had several live-in mistresses, one of whom, Mara, was a nursemaid to the children of Douglas Busk, a British ambassador. Mara lived with him in the Kavaklıdere hills in a small house that he called "Cicero Villa". Their relationship was tumultuous and Bazna ended the affair due to their fighting and her jealousy. However, she was loyal to him and passed important information to him twice, once about the upcoming arrival of British security men at the embassy and the second time when she said that she had heard rumors that the Germans had a good source of intelligence. Once he began seeing a new mistress, Esra, his relationship with Mara ended permanently.

After Esra, he took a woman named Aika as his mistress and set her up in an apartment. She left after his pound notes were determined to be counterfeit. (Note: Bazna claimed that he provided for the women and children in his life financially, including a dowry for Mara and a university education for Esra.) He married for a second time to a woman named Duriet and had four more children.

== Espionage career ==
=== Background: Turkey during World War II ===
Turkey was neutral during much of World War II, although in October 1939 Britain signed a treaty to protect Turkey should Germany attack it. Turkey maintained its neutrality by preventing German troops from crossing its borders into Syria or the USSR. During this time Turkey had lucrative trade relationships with Germany and the UK.

Germany had significant business interests in Turkey, including banks, and beginning in 1941 it was reliant on chromite, chromium ore, from Turkey for its armament production. In 1943 all of the chromite Germany imported for its weaponry came from Turkey.

Throughout the war Turkey's economy was reliant on and prospered by virtue of its affiliation with both the Allies and the Axis powers. As a result, the country's gold reserve had risen to 216 tons by the end of 1945, from 27 tons at the beginning of the war.

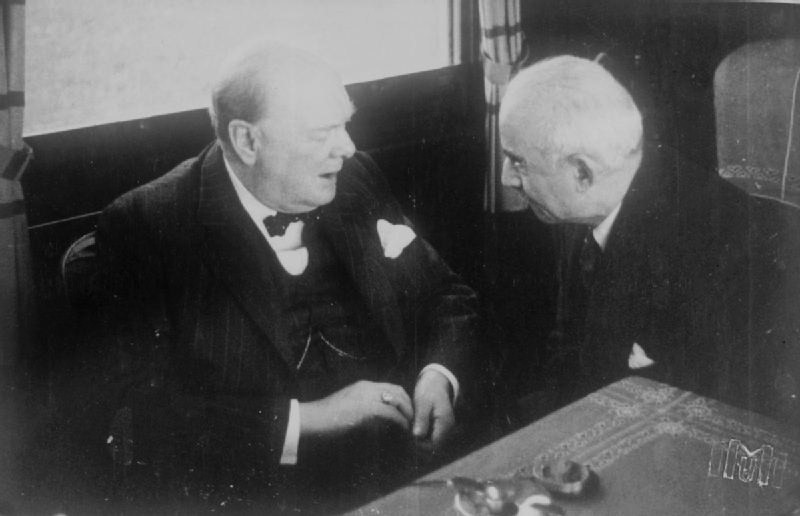
British Prime Minister Winston Churchill and Turkish President İsmet İnönü in conversation during a two-day conference in a train at Adana, circa 30 January 1943.

Starting in 1942 the Allies provided military aid, and then began imposing economic sanctions in 1943 to force Turkey to enter the war. (Note: Turkish leaders conferred with Roosevelt and Churchill at the Cairo Conference in November 1943, and promised to enter the war. By April 1944 Nazi forces in the Crimea were in full retreat. The Turkish government worried that the advancing Red Army might drive through Bulgaria and seize the Turkish Straits, which the Russians coveted. Turkish policy had been to stay neutral during the war. Now that they saw the need to reach some accommodation with the Allies, the Turks replaced their army chief Fevzi Çakmak with Kâzım Orbay, who was "more sympathetic to the Allies".) The Allied powers wanted Turkey to become engaged in a fight against Germany's eastern flank; however, Turkey was afraid of being overrun by the Russian and German armies, both of which were led by dictators.

The Allied and Axis powers became increasingly involved in espionage in Turkey to protect their own strategic interests beginning in 1943. There were two Allied factions, the western Allies and the Soviet Union. Germany was the third entity engaged in intelligence gathering. The Germans were able to fund their espionage, propaganda and diplomacy efforts from the profits of its banks in Turkey and through counterfeiting.

By August 1944 Turkey broke off relations with Germany, as its defeat began to seem inevitable. In February 1945 it declared war on Germany and Japan, a symbolic move that allowed Turkey to join the emerging United Nations.

=== Employment by diplomats ===
Bazna worked for foreign diplomats and consulates as a doorman, driver and guard upon his return to Turkey. Aided by his ability to speak French, he served as a kavass or valet, first to the Yugoslav ambassador to Turkey. In 1942, he worked as a valet for Albert Jenke, a German businessman and later embassy staff member, who came to fire Bazna for reading his mail.

Before he worked for Sir Hughe Knatchbull-Hugessen in 1943, (Note: The date Bazna began working for the embassy varies depending upon the source. He has said he started in mid-July, September, or October 1943.) Bazna was hired to do some household and vehicle repairs for Douglas Busk, the First Secretary of the British Embassy. Due to Bazna's poor English, he answered all interview questions in French. Although he supplied some written biographical information, excluding having been employed and fired by Jenke, none of the biographical information was checked. The Turkish secret service apparently warned the embassy at some point about Bazna. Over the few months that he worked for Busk, Bazna secretly photographed a few documents and, with the help of Mrs. Busk's nursemaid Mara, he tried to gain access to more valuable forms of intelligence.

Busk agreed to recommend Bazna for the open position of valet to Sir Hughe Knatchbull-Hugessen, the British ambassador to Turkey, who hired him in 1943 assuming that a background check had been performed. Knatchbull-Hugessen had been the British ambassador in Riga, Latvia, until 1935.

Anthony Cave Brown, author of Bodyguard of Lies, wrote, "Soon, Bazna had ingratiated himself to the extent that Sir Hughe elevated him from purely household duties to a position of some power within the residency and embassy. He dressed him in an imposing blue uniform, gave him a peaked cap, and used him as a guard to the door of his study; Bazna excluded visitors when Sir Hughe was thinking or napping. For ceremonial occasions, Sir Hughe dressed him in richly embroidered brocade, shoes with turned up toes, a fez with a tassel, gave him an immense scimitar, and placed him on the main door. Sir Hughe also paid him more than the 100 Turkish lira that was standard for a valet, and quietly turned a blind eye to the fact that Bazna was having an affair with Lady Knatchbull-Hugessen's nursemaid in the servants' quarters." Bazna often sang German Lieder after lunch while Knatchbull-Hugessen played the piano, much to the ambassador's enjoyment.

=== Beginning of espionage career ===
While at Riga, Knatchbull-Hugessen had developed a habit of taking secret papers to his home from the British embassy, and continued that practice in Ankara. (Note: There was a leak noted before Bazna began work as spy for the Germans. In October 1941 a de-crypt from ISOS stated that there was a leak at the embassy.) Bazna gained access to documents in the ambassador's document box and safe using his locksmithing skills, including making impressions and then copies of the key for the document box. He began photographing secret documents about war strategy, troop movements and negotiations with Turkey to enter the war. He took the photographs while the ambassador slept, took a bath or played the piano.

Bazna approached the German Embassy in Ankara on 26 October 1943, indicating that he wanted £20,000 for two rolls of film of the ambassador's documents. He became a spy through the connection with his former employer, Albert Jenke. Jenke was the brother-in-law of Joachim von Ribbentrop, the German Foreign Minister. Although Bazna was fired by Jenke, his wife contacted German intelligence officer Ludwig Carl Moyzisch, serving as the Sicherheitsdienst (SD) officer attached to the German embassy in Ankara, and told him of the photographs that Bazna had taken of classified information at the British Embassy. (Note: The Alliance of Enemies: The Untold Story of the Secret American and German Collaboration to End World War II states that Jenke was the son-in-law of Joachim von Ribbentrop. But other sources states that Jenke was Ribbentrop's brother-in-law.) He became a paid German agent under Moyzisch and was given the SD code name "Cicero" by German Ambassador Franz von Papen due to Bazna's "astonishing eloquence". His Nazi paymasters made about one-half of his payments in counterfeit bank notes under Operation Bernhard.

According to Muammer Kaylan, author of The Kemalists: Islamic Revival and the Fate of Secular Turkey, Bazna said he had begun spying for the Germans because he needed the money and, although he was not a Nazi, he liked Germans and disliked the British. He also alluded to involvement with the Milli Emniyet Hizmeti, which became the Turkish National Security Service in 1965. (Note: Bazna told Moyzisch a misleading and melodramatic story explaining his hatred of the British, saying that his father had been killed by a Briton, which initially moved but ultimately left Moyzisch skeptical. As it turned out the story was untrue – his father died peacefully in his bed.)

British historian Richard Wires wrote that Bazna was motivated entirely by greed, as he had dreams of becoming rich by selling secrets to the Germans. Wires described Bazna as a typical petty criminal from the Balkans, a man of low intelligence with no values except greed who was apolitical and opportunistic, taking advantages of whatever chances he found to try to get rich but who was easily duped by the Germans.

Wilfred Dunderdale stated his opinion about whether Bazna received training from the Italian secret intelligence service, SIM, "We always thought Cicero was an Italian agent because of his modus operandi - they gave their agents special training in locksmithery and in infiltrating diplomatic households."

=== Intelligence ===
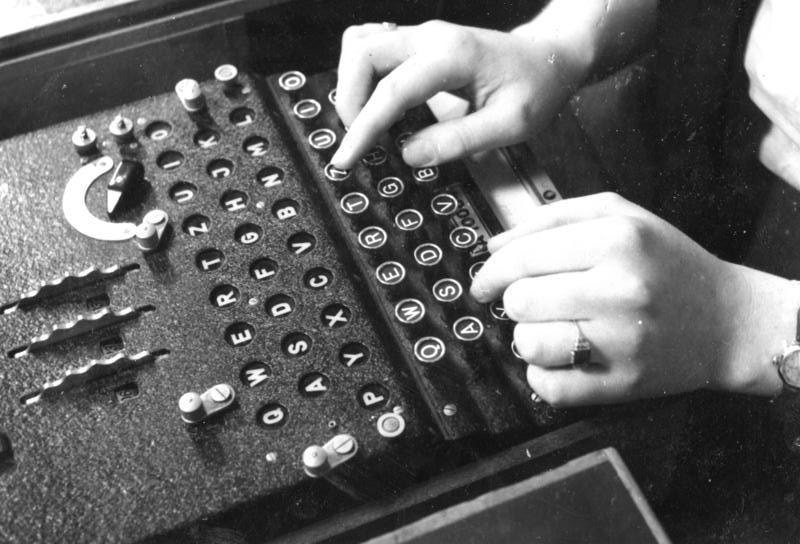
Enigma cipher machine.

During the first three months of 1944, Cicero supplied the Germans with copies of documents taken from his employer's dispatch box or safe. Photographs of top-secret documents were generally handed over in Moyzisch's car, which was parked inconspicuously on an Ankara street. On one occasion this led to a high-speed chase around Ankara, as someone had taken an interest in the hand-over. Bazna, who had perhaps been tailed, escaped.

Ultra, the British codebreaking system based at Bletchley Park, routinely read German messages, coded by the Enigma machine. From that information the codebreakers knew that there was an intelligence breach, but did not know that the source was the British Embassy in Turkey.

Guy Liddell, who worked for MI5, recorded that there was a breach in security at the embassy on 17 October 1943, which was later reported by ISOS, Intelligence Service Oliver Strachey. The leak involved an embassy diplomat bag and two agents. On 3 November Liddell talked to Stewart Menzies, head of the British Secret Intelligence Service. From the discussion Liddell learned that the leak of the diplomatic bag occurred during or after the air attaché brought it back from Cairo, which put not-yet-deployed re-ciphering tables at risk and required the abandonment of the tables. There were also missing blueprints for a gun at the office of a military attaché. Menzies stated that there was an investigation underway at the embassy, but nothing more was said about the leak for a few months.

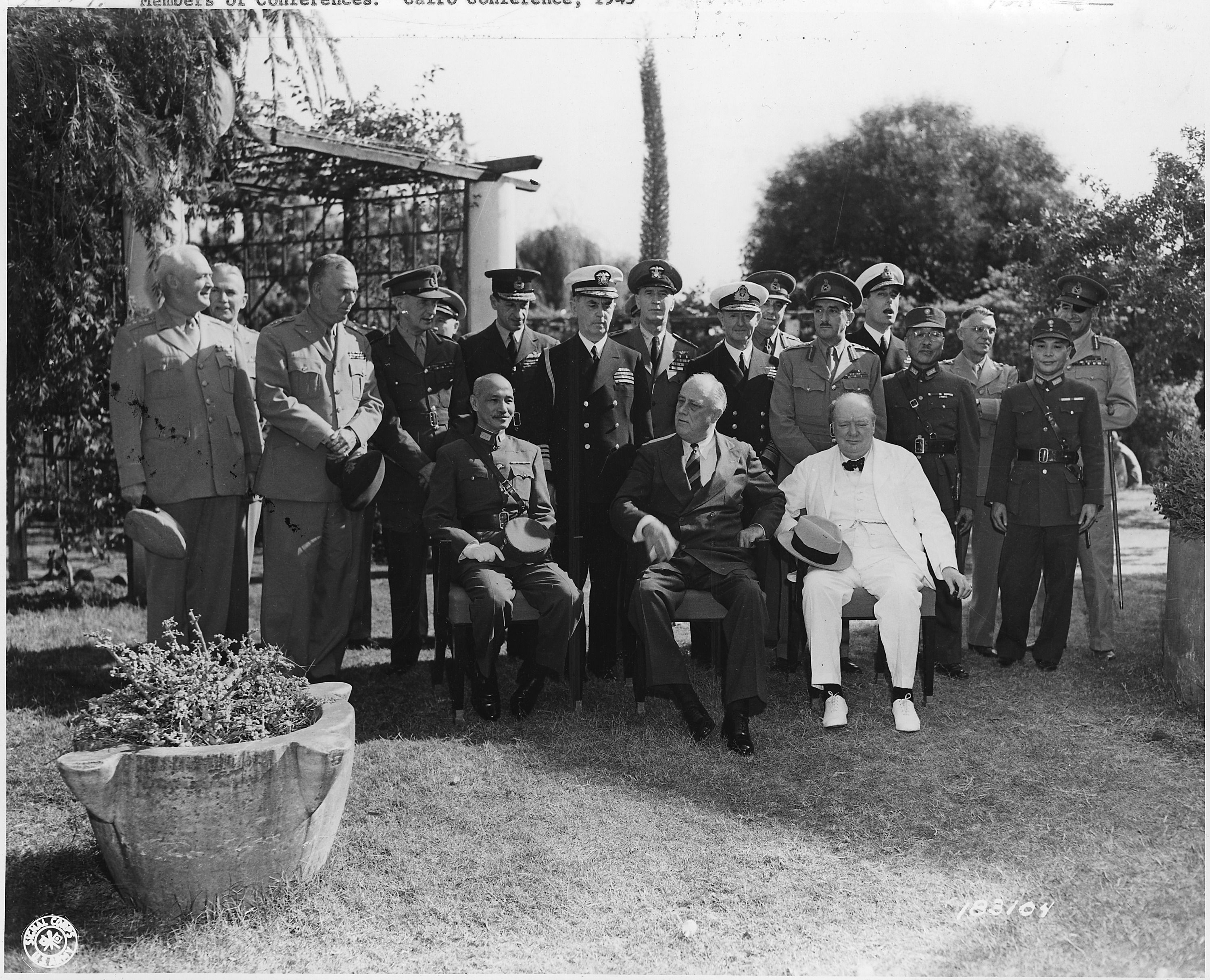
Allied leaders at the Cairo Conference held in Cairo, Egypt, in November 1943. Seated are Gen. Chiang Kai-shek, Franklin D. Roosevelt and Winston Churchill.

As Cicero, Bazna passed on important information about many of the Allied leaders' conferences, including the Moscow, Tehran and Cairo Conferences. Fortunately for the British, Knatchbull-Hugessen only had possession of one document of notes from the conferences.

The intelligence provided by Cicero included a document instructing Knatchbull-Hugessen to request the use of Turkish air bases "to maintain a threat to the Germans from the eastern Mediterranean until Overlord is launched." The document carried the highest security restriction (BIGOT list). Cicero conveyed limited information about Operation Overlord (the code name for the Invasion of Normandy in June 1944), which was not correlated by the Germans until after the war when films about Cicero were released.

According to the British Foreign Office's postwar review of Cicero's potential impacts, "It [Bazna's intelligence] provided the Germans with streams of information from the desk of the ambassador about British and Allied intentions in the Near and Middle East and for the conduct of the war generally, and might easily have compromised Operation Overlord (the preparations for D-Day)."

When the Cicero documents predicted Allied bombing missions in the Balkans, which took place on the predicted date, the authenticity of the information was supported and his reputation enhanced. Moyzisch told Cicero that at the end of the war Hitler intended to give him a villa.

=== Appraisal by the Germans ===
Copies of the developed film or summaries prepared by Moyzisch were promptly passed on to senior German leaders. Ribbentrop showed the initial set of photographs to Hitler immediately upon receipt. Hitler entered a conference with some Cicero materials in December 1943 and declared that the invasion in the west would come in spring 1944. He concluded, though, that there would also be attacks in other locations, such as Norway or the Balkans.

According to Moyzisch, the German Foreign Office did not make much use of the documents, because officers there were divided about their reliability for several reasons. There was a steady stream of documents, which was highly unusual. Cicero seemed to have used sophisticated photography techniques to create unusually clear images, which raised the question of whether he acted alone. (Note: Moyzisch was convinced that the spy had someone helping him locate and photograph the documents. German photography experts reviewed 112 photographs provided by Cicero and determined that one person could have held the documents and taken the photographs. Based on the subsequent photograph that showed a hurried image with fingers and Bazna's signet ring, a German investigator was brought to Turkey. He determined that the photographer was quite skilled, but appeared to have assistance taking at least one photograph. Doubts persisted, but a second man was never identified.) Antipathy between von Papen and Ribbentrop added to the ineffective analysis of the intelligence. Aware of the Allied forces' attempts to bring Turkey into the war, however, von Papen was able to thwart their efforts for a time by threatening to destroy İzmir and Istanbul if Turkey declared war against Germany. Being able to postpone Turkey's alliance with the Allied forces and the use of their airfields, von Papen told Ribbentrop that the way was now clear to take the Balkans.

=== Double agent hypothesis ===
The Abwehr was right to worry about the presence of British double agents within their secret service. They were at that time already running "Garbo" (Juan Pujol), "Zig-Zag" (Eddie Chapman) and "Tricycle" (Dušan Popov), supposedly German agents to whom they were paying large sums of money but who were in reality working for the British and supplying the Germans with false information.

The head of the British Secret Intelligence Service, Stewart Menzies, stated that Cicero was indeed a double agent and that among the documents submitted to the Germans were documents of misinformation. Author James Srodes states in his biography of Allen Dulles that some British historians believed that Cicero was "'turned' into a double agent to send disinformation via von Papen". Canadian journalist Malcolm Gladwell, author of Pandora's Briefcase, said that an interviewer had questioned Menzies before he died about whether he was telling the truth. Menzies told the interviewer, "Of course, Cicero was under our control," but his truthfulness is questioned. Gladwell stated in an article in The New Yorker, "If you had been the wartime head of M.I.6, giving an interview shortly before your death, you probably would say that Cicero was one of yours." Gladwell also mentions that while Ribbentrop was wary of Bazna, which curtailed the dissemination of some of Bazna's intelligence, most German intelligence officials were not wary of him.

Anthony Cave Brown suggests in his book Bodyguard of Lies that MI6's continental secret service chief, Lt. Col. Montague Reaney Chidson, who was responsible for security of the embassy, would not have overlooked Bazna as a potential threat and may have fed the documents that Bazna found in the ambassador's keeping or directly led Cicero as a double agent. Brown states that "Bazna was indeed under British control within a short time after he started to photograph the documents", and he was a participant in Plan Jael and Operation Bodyguard.

Mummer Kaylan states that through his personal knowledge of Bazna, he thought that Bazna supported Turkish interests and was not guided by British Intelligence. Further, he says that Bazna having passed on "genuine", "important" intelligence and the codeword for Operation Overlord to the Germans supports his theory that Bazna was not a double agent. If he was a double agent, Kaylan believes, he was an agent for the Turkish Security Service, Milli Emniyet Hizmeti. Walter Schellenberg, too, wondered if Bazna passed on intelligence to the Turkish Secret Service.

=== Discovery of intelligence leaks ===
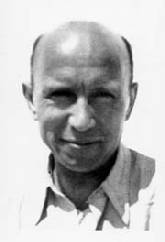
Fritz Kolbe, a German diplomat who became America's most important spy against the Nazis in World War II. Office of Strategic Services' Allen Dulles said of him, "George Wood (our code name for Kolbe) was not only our best source on Germany but undoubtedly one of the best secret agents any intelligence service has ever had." Kolbe identified that there was a spy operating out of a British Embassy in December 1943.

Kolbe, assistant to German diplomat Karl Ritter, screened German cable messages for information to summarize and supply to Allen Dulles, who was the Office of Strategic Services (OSS) chief representative in Bern. In late December 1943 Kolbe reported that there was a spy operating out of a British Embassy with the code name Cicero. Dulles forwarded this information to MI6 agent Frederick Vanden Heuvel on 1 January 1944.

Cave Brown contends that Dulles passed the information to London in December. As Bazna was about to carry out acts of espionage in December, Brown concludes that Bazna was likely a double agent.

American agents in Ankara investigated Cicero's identity based upon Dulles' intelligence. British intelligence, which was asked by Dulles to interrogate Cicero, gave the impression that it believed Bazna could not speak English and, furthermore, was "too stupid" to be a spy. British Foreign Office workers, though, were concerned about Operation Overlord leaks and thought that Bazna might be Cicero. They implemented a sting in January 1944 using a false Cabinet Office document that was drafted by the chair of the Joint Intelligence Committee, Victor Cavendish-Bentinck, and given the forged signature of Foreign Secretary Anthony Eden. The document was planted in the embassy, but the sting was unsuccessful in trapping Bazna.

Around January 1944, Moyzisch hired a new secretary named Cornelia Kapp, also known as Nele Kapp, who had spied for the British and Americans in exchange for permission to emigrate to the US. She had worked at the German embassy in Sofia, Bulgaria, beginning in July 1943 and within a month had become a spy. In January 1944 she moved to Ankara to work at the German embassy under Moyzisch. Kapp was asked by the OSS to learn about the spy that Moyzisch met with. She was adept at gathering intelligence within the office. She flirted with Cicero when he called the office to schedule a meeting with Moyzisch. When she could, she also followed the two men to try to see what the spy looked like, but was unsuccessful at getting a good view of him. Kapp had gathered and shared a lot of information with the OSS over the months that she worked at the embassy, including all she felt she could expect to learn about Cicero. (Note: In March 1944 she opened a courier bag, not identified for Moyzisch's eyes only, with information about Cicero at the British Embassy. She asked Moyzisch about the spy, which was unsettling to him. Kapp became fearful that she would be killed and "had a nervous breakdown". Fearing for her safety, Kapp fled Turkey and was placed in a Cairo internment camp before defecting to the US. Moyzisch, who called his secretary Elisabet in his book Operation Cicero, said that he believed she was responsible for the downfall of the Cicero affair. Kapp was the daughter of a German consul and anti-Nazi and had spent most of her early life in Calcutta (India) and Cleveland (Ohio). Moyzisch did not know that Nele hated the Nazis and had been supplying information to the British and the American OSS. She eventually defected and was helped by an OSS agent to board the Taurus Express from Ankara to Istanbul, but alighting before getting to the city she was taken to an air base the RAF was building in Turkey. From there she was driven to İzmir and then ultimately made her way to Cairo, where she was furious to learn that she was to be interned as a German. She eventually reached the United States, settled in California, married an American and had at least one child.)

Once the embassy had been tipped off that there was a spy operating in the facility in early 1944, Bazna found it increasingly difficult to gather intelligence. The British Field Office had warned the embassy of a security leak. Bazna forwarded the document to the Germans. The warning had come to Churchill from Roosevelt, who obtained the information given by a defector to the US. A new alarm system in the British Embassy now required Bazna to remove a fuse whenever he wanted to look in the ambassador's safe.

Bazna gave notice about the third week of January 1944 that he would be leaving the ambassador's employment. He stopped selling information to the Germans by the end of February 1944 and left the embassy at the end of the month or about 20 April without any trouble. Bazna was identified as Cicero after the war ended.

=== Potential consequences ===
One of the best-known spy stories of our time is that of Operation Cicero, a textbook exercise in spycraft set in neutral Ankara, Turkey, during World War II. It is, perhaps, of little importance that the exercise remained rather academic – that the information pilfered in the best traditions of the cloak-and-dagger business was never fully used by the Nazis; that the British, warned of the Ciceronian activity, took no effective action to stop it and that Cicero himself was never brought to book. As a matter of fact, the academic nature of the exercise makes Operation Cicero a nice, neat package to handle, uncomplicated by consequences and relatively free of loose ends.

— Dorothy J. Heatts, Footnote to Cicero, CIA Historical Review Program

In March 2005 British Foreign and Commonwealth Office historians issued The Cicero Papers, an analysis of the potential consequences of the 'Cicero Affair'. In it they identified four important ways in which Cicero's intelligence could have harmed the Allied forces during World War II.

One of the key potential consequences was the possibility of alerting the German regime to the scope of Project Overlord. Fortunately, the location and date of the planned invasion were not conveyed. Allied forces wanted Turkey to declare war and join them in their efforts against Germany, particularly after they had taken the Dodecanese Islands and had secured Italy as a partner against Germany.

Turkish airfields were important to maintain their strategic advantage in the area, particularly to support Operation Accolade, the British assault on Rhodes and the Dodecanese Islands. With Cicero's intelligence, von Papen was able to delay Turkey's entry into the war.

Bazna passed on the details for the Tehran Conference plans. Once the British became aware of the leak they were concerned Cicero had leaked information that might help crack the British cipher, but that did not occur. Lastly, the intelligence might have made the Germans believe that there was no danger of attack in the Balkans, which may have been the most potentially damaging information gleaned by Cicero for the Germans.

== After the war ==
After the war, the OSS conducted an investigation into Cicero, interviewing important figures in German intelligence, including Moyzisch. It was postulated that of the intelligence conveyed by Cicero to the Germans, the most notable information came from Knatchbull-Hugessen's notes, particularly regarding diplomatic efforts with the Turkish government. Many of the other documents were considered by Ostuf Schuddekoft, head of the British section of Amt VI [one of the 11 departments of Hauptamt Volksdeutsche Mittelstelle], to be too old to be of much value to the Germans.

Moyzisch was aggressively interviewed by the Allies and was a witness at the Nuremberg trials, after which he wrote a book to address rumours and explain his role during the war. He was never charged with war crimes.

Knatchbull-Hugessen's reputation was severely affected by the Cicero Affair, particularly as he had been previously warned about leaving his keys and document boxes unattended. On 28 August 1945, Knatchbull-Hugessen received a formal reprimand.

The Abwehr paid Bazna £300,000, which he kept hidden. After the war he tried to build a hotel with a partner, but when his sterling notes were checked by the Bank of England, they were found to be mostly counterfeit (see Operation Bernhard). The spy remarked that the notes were "not worth even the price of the Turkish linen out of which they had been manufactured." Bazna served some time in prison for using counterfeit money.

Bazna lived in an apartment in the European Aksaray neighbourhood of Istanbul with his family in the 1950s. He gave singing lessons and worked selling used cars and as a night watchman.

Much of the money he earned went to the creditors who had been paid with forged money. He contacted the West German government to be reimbursed for the counterfeit money that he received. Although he tried many times and in many ways to get paid, he never received any money.

In 1960 Bazna moved to Germany and worked in Munich as a night watchman. Bazna and Hans Nogly wrote I Was Cicero, which was published in 1962. It told the story of the Cicero Affair from Bazna's perspective following Moyzisch's book Operation Cicero published in 1950. Bazna died in Munich of kidney disease in December 1970, aged 66.

== In popular culture ==
According to the British Foreign Office: "The tale has become a popular (and frequently mis-told) war story."

Moyzisch published his memoirs, titled Operation Cicero, in 1950. (Note: Both books by Bazna and Moyzisch had "factual errors", according to Jefferson Adams.) Franz von Papen and Allen Dulles suggested that there was more to the story than was published in the book, but neither provided any details. Twelve years later, in 1962, I Was Cicero was published by Cicero himself.

A film based on Moyzisch's book Operation Cicero was released by 20th Century-Fox in 1952. It was titled 5 Fingers and directed by Joseph L. Mankiewicz. Bazna, renamed Ulysses Diello, was played by James Mason.

A 2019 Turkish language film entitled Operation Cicero was released. It was an enjoyable but highly romanticised account based on some of the original events and characters.

Cicero is also mentioned in passing in the James Bond novel 'Moonraker' as an example of a trusted servant operating as a spy.

== Sources ==
- Adams, Jefferson (2009). "Cicero Affair". Historical Dictionary of German Intelligence. Scarecrow Press. ISBN 978-0-8108-6320-0.
- Auer, Peter (1995). Von Dahlem each Hiroshima. Aufbau Verlag GmbH. ISBN 3-351-02429-0.
- Bazna, Elyesa (1962). I was Cicero. London: A. Deutsch. LCCN 62048893.
- BBC Staff (1 April 2005). "Secret plot to catch out Nazi spy". BBC News.
- Brown, Anthony Cave (2007). Bodyguard of Lies. Globe Pequot Press. ISBN 978-1-59921-383-5.
- CIA (18 September 2016). "Footnote to Cicero, CIA Historical Review Program". Central Intelligence Agency. Archived from the original on 9 January 2008.
- Craig, John S. (2005). Peculiar Liaisons: In War, Espionage, and Terrorism in the Twentieth Century. Algora Publishing. ISBN 978-0-87586-331-3.
- Crump, Thomas (2013). Brezhnev and the Decline of the Soviet Union. Routledge. ISBN 978-1-134-66915-8.
- Delattre, Lucas (2007). A Spy at the Heart of the Third Reich: The Extraordinary Story of Fritz Kolbe, America's Most Important Spy in World War II. Grove/Atlantic, Incorporated. ISBN 978-0-8021-9649-1.
- Denniston, Robin (September 2004). "Bazna, Elyesa [alias Cicero] (b. 1903), spy". Oxford Dictionary of National Biography (online ed.). Oxford University Press. doi:10.1093/ref:odnb/60870. (Subscription, Wikipedia Library access or UK public library membership required.)
- Edwards, A. C. (1946). "The Impact of the War on Turkey". International Affairs. 22 (3): 389–400. doi:10.2307/3017044. JSTOR 3017044.
- FCO Historians (March 2005). "The Cicero Papers". Foreign and Commonwealth Office.
- Gladwell, Malcolm (10 May 2010). "Pandora's Briefcase".
- Hanovs, Deniss; Teraudkalns, Valdis (2013). Ultimate Freedom – No Choice: The Culture of Authoritarianism in Latvia, 1934–1940. Brill. ISBN 978-90-04-24464-1.
- Kaylan, Muammer (2005). The Kemalists: Islamic Revival and the Fate of Secular Turkey. Prometheus Books. ISBN 978-1-61592-897-2.
- Keegan, John (2002). "Bazna, Elyesa". Who's Who in World War II. Routledge. ISBN 978-1-134-50964-5.
- Kirkus Reviews (15 October 1999). "The Cicero Spy Affair: German Access to British Secrets in World War II". Kirkus Reviews.
- Luce, Henry Robinson, ed. (1971). "Died. Elyesa Bazna". Time. Time Incorporated. p. xcvi.
- Kurbalija, Jovan; Slavik, Hannah (2001). Language and Diplomacy. Diplo Foundation. ISBN 978-99909-55-15-6.
- Maclean, Fitzroy (1978). Take Nine Spies. Weidenfeld and Nicolson. ISBN 9780297773856.
- Maslin, Janet (8 August 2012). "The Agents Who Fooled the Nazis About D-Day". The New York Times.
- Nash, Jay Robert (1997). Spies: A Narrative Encyclopedia of Dirty Tricks and Double Dealing from Biblical Times to Today. M. Evans. ISBN 978-1-4617-4770-3.
- National Archives (UK) (2005). "Cicero archives at the British Foreign Office". National Archives (UK).
- National Archives and Records Administration (15 August 2016). "Records of the Foreign Service Posts of the Department of State (RG 84): Turkey". State Department and Foreign Affairs Records – via National Archives and Records Administration.
- Osborn, Patrick R. (2000). Operation Pike: Britain Versus the Soviet Union, 1939–1941. Greenwood Publishing Group. ISBN 978-0-313-31368-4.
- Paterson, Tony (25 September 2004). "Germany finally honours the 'traitor' spy". The Independent.
- Polmar, Norman; Allen, Thomas B. (2012). World War II: the Encyclopedia of the War Years, 1941–1945. Courier Corporation. ISBN 978-0-486-47962-0.
- Price, Sean (2014). World War II Spies. Capstone. ISBN 978-1-4765-3592-0.
- Roth, Arthur (1981). Great spy stories. Scholastic Book Services. ISBN 978-0-590-31393-3.
- Shugaar, Antony; Peter Earnest; Steven Guarnaccia (2006). I Lie for a Living: Greatest Spies of All Times. National Geographic. ISBN 978-0-7922-5316-7.
- Simmons, Mark (2014). Agent Cicero: Hitler's Most Successful Spy. History Press. ISBN 978-0-7509-5729-8.
- Srodes, James (2000). Allen Dulles: Master of Spies. Regnery Publishing, Incorporated, An Eagle Publishing Company. ISBN 978-0-89526-223-3.
- Steinberg, Jonathan (1999). The Deutsche Bank and Its Gold Transactions During the Second World War. C.H.Beck. ISBN 978-3-406-44552-1.
- Sweeney, Kevin (1999). James Mason: A Bio-bibliography. Greenwood Publishing Group. pp. 124–125. ISBN 978-0-313-28496-0.
- Trenear-Harvey, Glenmore S. (2014). Historical Dictionary of Intelligence Failures. Rowman & Littlefield Publishers. ISBN 978-1-4422-3274-7.
- Tweedie, Neil; Day, Peter (22 May 2003). "Envoy's singing valet was Nazi spy". Telegraph. Archived from the original on 4 August 2011.
- VanderLippe, John M. (2012). Politics of Turkish Democracy, The: Ismet Inonu and the Formation of the Multi-Party System, 1938–1950. SUNY Press. ISBN 978-0-7914-8337-4.
- von Hassell, Agostino; MacRae, Sigrid (2013). Alliance of Enemies: The Untold Story of the Secret American and German Collaboration to End World War II. St. Martin's Press. ISBN 978-1-4668-5998-2.
- Wires, Richard (1999). The Cicero Spy Affair: German Access to British Secrets in World War II. Greenwood Publishing Group. ISBN 978-0-275-96456-6.
- Yenne, Bill (2015). Operation Long Jump: Stalin, Roosevelt, Churchill, and the Greatest Assassination Plot in History. Regnery Publishing. ISBN 978-1-62157-346-3.
- Zurcher, Erik J. (2004). Turkey: A Modern History (3rd ed.).
