= USS Ancon (AGC-4) =

United States Navy headquarters and communications command ship

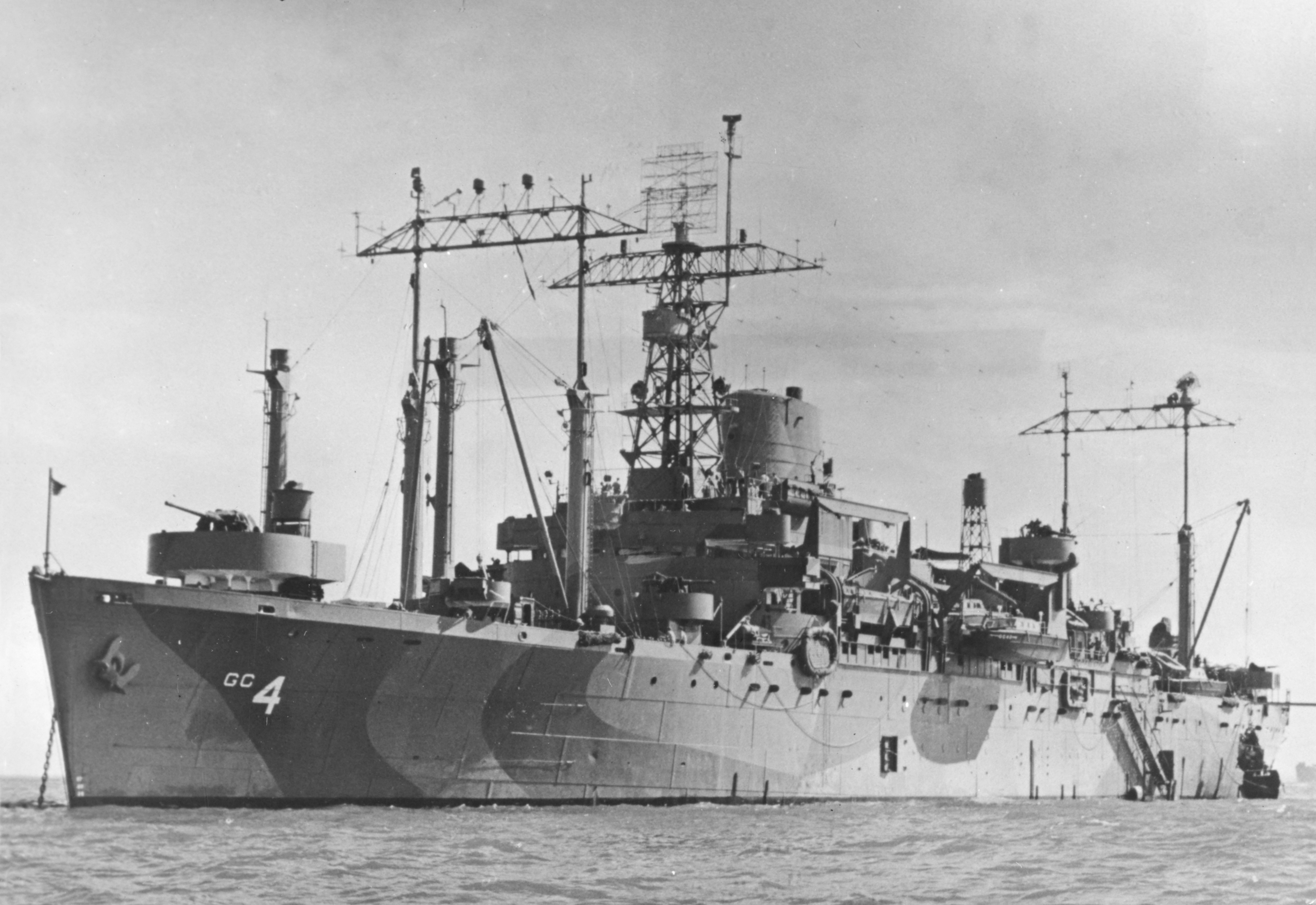
- Ancon in 1945

History

United States
- Name: Ancon (1939–1962); State of Maine (1962–1973)
- Namesake: Ancón, Panama
- Builder: Fore River Shipyard
- Laid down: 23 October 1937
- Launched: 10 December 1938
- Acquired: (by Navy) 7 August 1942
- Commissioned: (by Navy) 12 August 1942
- Decommissioned: (by Navy) 25 February 1946
- In service: 1939–1973
- Stricken: (by Navy) 17 April 1946
- Honours and awards: five battle stars for World War II service
- Fate: Scrapped in 1973

General characteristics
- Displacement: 14,150 tons
- Length: 493 ft (150 m)
- Beam: 64 ft (20 m)
- Draft: 26 ft 3 in (8.00 m)
- Propulsion: two steam turbine engines, 9,166 shp
- Speed: 18 knots (33 km/h)
- Complement: 707
- Armament: two 5 in (130 mm) gun mounts; four twin 40 mm gun mounts; fourteen single 20 mm gun mounts

USS Ancon (AGC-4) was one of three identical ships built for the Panama Railroad Company put into operation in 1938. The ship was converted to a troop ship by the Army in January 1942, making several voyages to Australia with troops as an Army Transport. In August 1942 the ship's operation was transferred to the United States Navy for the duration of World War II and converted to a combined headquarters and communications command ship.

== Early civilian service ==
Ancon was laid down 23 October 1937 as hull number 1468, second of three identical ships ordered by the Panama Railroad Company, launched on 10 December 1938 at Fore River Shipyard (Bethlehem Steel Company), Quincy, Massachusetts. (Note: DANFS gives the launch date for the first of the ships, Panama. The three ships with launch dates are: Panama 24 September 1938, Ancon 10 December 1938 and Cristobal 4 March 1939.) The ship was sponsored by Mrs. Harry Woodring, wife of the Secretary of War. The ship was owned and operated by the Panama Railroad Company, and on 22 June 1939 she began cargo and passenger service between New York City, New York and Cristobal, Panama Canal Zone.

== Army ==
Ancon was delivered by the Panama Railroad Company to begin war operations with the Army Transport Service on 11 January 1942 at Balboa, Canal Zone. (Note: Both the Canal Zone and Panama Railroad were entities under the United States Department of War at that time, thus there was no change in "ownership" involved.) The ship sailed to San Francisco for conversion, including 1,500 bunks, required to transport troops. She made two voyages to Australia carrying Army Air Corps units and elements of the 32nd Infantry Division to bolster that continent's defenses; the first voyage left on 31 January 1942 headed for Brisbane, Australia from San Francisco, the second left San Francisco on 23 April 1942 bound for Adelaide and Sydney. According to the diary of Edgar Roy Cochrun, Chaplain, United States Army, who had boarded the ship on 20 April, the Ancon departed San Francisco on its second voyage to Australia at 5:55 p.m. on Wednesday, 22 April 1942, and not on 23 April. She returned to San Francisco 18 June 1942,

Ancon underwent extensive repairs and alterations in San Francisco during June and July 1942 before sailing for Boston to be turned over to the Navy.

== Navy acquisition ==
Ancon was acquired by the Navy under bareboat charter on 7 August 1942 and placed in commission at the Boston Navy Yard as Ancon (AP-66) on 12 August 1942. Following her commissioning, Ancon underwent a month's work at Boston, being converted for naval service.

On 12 September, she got underway for the Virginia Capes and, on arrival at Norfolk took on cargo and troops to transport to Baltimore, Maryland. She reached Baltimore on 6 October and disembarked her passengers. She then conducted trials and exercises in the Chesapeake Bay. After pausing at Norfolk to take on more troops and equipment, she left the East Coast on 24 October, sailing for North Africa to take part in Operation Torch as the flagship of Transport Division 9, Amphibious Force, Atlantic Fleet.

== Mediterranean service ==
Ancon anchored off Fedhala, French Morocco on 8 November and began lowering her boats at 0533. The first troops were debarked an hour later. During the course of the assault, men on the ship witnessed the sinking of four other transports, and Ancon sent out boats to rescue their survivors. On 12 November the transport headed out and, three days later, put into Casablanca harbor. She got underway on the 15th with a convoy bound for Norfolk.

After a brief pause there, Ancon traveled to Brooklyn, New York for voyage repairs. A brief period of sea trials preceded the ship's loading cargo and troops for transportation to Algeria. She sailed on 14 January 1943 as a member of the Naval Transport Service. The ship reached Oran on the 26th and spent five days discharging her cargo before heading back toward New York City, where she arrived on 13 February. On that day, the vessel was reassigned to the Atlantic Fleet Amphibious Forces. On the 16th, Ancon entered the Norfolk Navy Yard, Portsmouth, Virginia, to undergo conversion to a combined headquarters and communications command ship. She was redesignated AGC-4 on 26 February with the conversion completed on 20 April 1943.

On 21 April, Ancon held trials and exercises in the Chesapeake Bay through May and into early June 1943, when she was designated the flagship of Vice Admiral Henry Kent Hewitt, Commander of the Atlantic Fleet Amphibious Forces. The ship got underway for Oran on 8 June with Task Force (TF) 85. The ship had been selected to participate in the invasion of Sicily, and her preparations continued after her arrival at Oran on 22 June.

Carrying Rear Admiral Alan G. Kirk, Commander, TF 85, and Lieutenant General Omar Bradley on board, Ancon sailed on 5 July for the waters off Sicily. She reached the transport area off Scoglitti on the 10th and lowered her boats early that morning. Despite enemy fire, the ship remained off Scoglitti providing communications services through the 12th and then got underway to return to North Africa. At the end of a fortnight there, she shifted to Mostaganem, Algeria, on 29 July. In mid-August, the vessel moved to Algiers. During her periods in port, she prepared for the upcoming invasion of mainland Italy for which she had been designated flagship for the Commander of the 8th Fleet Amphibious Forces in Northwest African Waters.

On 6 September, Ancon got underway for Salerno, serving as VADM Hewitt's flagship for the overall Task Force 80. During the operation, the ship carried Lieutenant General Mark Wayne Clark, who commanded the 5th Army. At 0330 on 9 September, the first wave of Allied troops hit the beach. Thereafter, she remained in the transport area, undergoing nearly continuous enemy air harassment, until she moved to Palermo, Sicily, to pick up ammunition to replenish her sister ships. She returned to the area off Salerno on the 15th but, the next day, arrived back in Palermo.

== Normandy ==
After two weeks in that Sicilian port, Ancon shaped a course for Algiers. She reached that port on 2 October and spent almost six weeks undergoing repairs and replenishment. In mid-November, she set sail for the United Kingdom and, on 25 November, arrived in Devonport, England, where she was designated the flagship of the 11th Amphibious Force. An extended period of repairs and preparations for the impending invasion of France kept Ancon occupied through the winter and much of the spring participating in numerous training exercises with other Allied warships. On 25 May, King George VI of the United Kingdom and Field Marshal Montgomery visited the ship. U.S. military advisor George Elsey wrote that during the trip a junior officer refused to admit the King into the ship's intelligence centre because, as he explained to a superior officer, "...nobody told me he was a BIGOT." The codeword signified personnel cleared to know the top-secret details of Overlord (known as the BIGOT list; people cleared to be on it were "Bigots").

The preparations culminated on 5 June, when Ancon got underway for Baie de la Seine, France. She served as flagship for the assault forces that landed on Omaha Beach in Normandy. Throughout the invasion, the ship provided instructions for forces both afloat and ashore. She transferred various units of the Army command to headquarters ashore and made her small boats available to other ships to carry personnel and materials to the beachhead. On 27 June, she got underway to return to England and, the next day, arrived at Portland.

George Hicks, a radio journalist, broadcast the invasion live. The New York World-Telegram called his broadcast "The greatest recording yet to come out of the war."

Ancon remained in British waters through late September, when she sailed in a convoy bound for the East Coast of the United States. She reached Charleston, South Carolina on 9 October and was then assigned to the Amphibious Training Command. At the completion of repairs at the Charleston Navy Yard on 21 December, the ship got underway for sea trials. Five days later, she shaped a course for the Pacific. On the last day of 1944, the ship transited the Panama Canal and joined the Pacific Fleet. She continued on to San Diego, California, where she arrived on 9 January 1945.

== Pacific service ==
Upon reaching San Diego, Ancon entered Amphibious Group 5. She then proceeded to Pearl Harbor and, during the first two weeks of February, carried out training exercises in Hawaiian waters. On 15 February 1945, she set out for Eniwetok where she paused to refuel before pushing on to Saipan. Ancon reached Saipan late in February 1945 and began holding rehearsals off that island and Tinian for the upcoming assault on Okinawa. The ship sailed for the Ryūkyūs with Transport Squadron 15 on 27 March.

Ancon arrived with TG 51.2 off the southeast coast of Okinawa on 1 April. Due to heavy enemy air activity, the ship stood out to sea on the 3rd and set out for Saipan on the 11th. She disembarked Marines at Saipan on the 15th. After replenishment, Ancon left Saipan to return to Okinawa. For three weeks, she was anchored off the western beaches of Okinawa and supported forces ashore. During this time, the ship was almost continuously at general quarters due to Japanese air raids.

Ancon left Okinawa on 3 June and proceeded to Subic Bay and Manila, Philippines. There, she served as flagship of Commander, 7th Amphibious Force. For the next two months, the ship was involved in preparations for invasion of the Japanese home islands. However, this operation never materialized because Japan capitulated on 15 August. Shortly thereafter, Ancon got underway for Tokyo Bay with an intermediate stop at Iwo Jima. On 22 August, the ship rendezvoused with units of the 3d Fleet and sailed on toward Japan.

On the morning of the 29th, Ancon sailed into Tokyo Bay and assumed duties as a press release ship in coordination with battleship USS Iowa (BB-61). From the ship's anchorage between USS Missouri (BB-63) and USS South Dakota (BB-57), her crew witnessed the official Japanese surrender on 2 September. Ancon left Japanese waters on 20 September and set a course for Guam. She briefly stopped at Apra Harbor on the 27th, pushing on that same day for Saipan. There, the ship embarked occupation troops and supplies before reversing her course on 29 September and heading back to Japan.

On 2 October, Ancon was assigned to the 5th Fleet as the headquarters ship for a strategic bombing survey. She touched at Yokohama, Japan on 3 October and remained in that area through November. Then, her survey duties being completed, the ship got underway on 1 December to return to the United States. Ancon reached San Francisco Bay on 14 December. She remained at San Francisco in availability until 4 January 1946 when she sailed for the East Coast. The vessel again passed through the Panama Canal on 14 January and rejoined the Atlantic Fleet. She continued on to the New York Naval Shipyard, where she arrived on the 23rd and began deactivation preparations.

== Awards ==
European-African-Middle Eastern Campaign Medal, 8 Nov 41 – 11 Nov 42, Algeria-Morocco Occupation, Operation Torch, the Allied Invasion of French North Africa.

European-African-Middle Eastern Campaign Medal, 9 Jul 43 – 15 Jul 43, Sicily Occupation, Operation Husky, the Allied Invasion of Sicily.

European-African-Middle Eastern Campaign Medal, 9 Sep 43 – 21 Sep 43, Salerno Landings, Operation Avalanche, the Allied Invasion of Italy.

European-African-Middle Eastern Campaign Medal, 6 Jun 44 – 25 Jun 44, Normandy Landings, Operation Overlord, D-Day.

Asiatic-Pacific Campaign Medal, 1 Apr 45 – 3 Jun 45, Ryuku Islands Landings, Operation Iceberg, The Battle of Okinawa.

Philippine Liberation Medal, 5 Jun 45 – 20 August 1945, Subic Bay Philippines, Philippines Campaign of 1944-45.

World War II Victory Medal, 7 Dec 41 – 31 Dec 46

Navy Occupation Service Medal with Pacific Clasp, 2 Sep 45 – 20 Sep 45 or from 2 Oct 45 – 30 Nov 45, Tokyo, and later Yokohama, Occupation of Japan.

== Decommissioning and disposal ==
Ancon was decommissioned on 25 February 1946 and struck from the Navy List on 17 April 1946. The ship was returned to the Panama Canal Company 25 February 1946 with commercial service discontinued 20 April 1961. (Note: Troopships of World War II notes transfer immediate with DANFS supporting that with "decommissioned on 25 February 1946 and was returned to her owner." MARAD status card shows return in 1951, five years later. The ship was not an MC type or build, the War Department apparently held title to the government ship, first through the Panama Railroad and through the war so that MC status may not have been maintained as closely as with MC hulls.) On 29 June 1962 title was transferred to the Maritime Administration at New Orleans and loaned to the Maine Maritime Academy. Ancon was renamed State of Maine on 14 July 1962. The academy operated the ship as a training ship until returning her to the Maritime Administration 25 May 1973 when the ship was delivered to North American Smelting Company for scrapping.
