= Jacques Bigot =

Jacques Bigot may refer to:

- Jacques Bigot (Jesuit) (1651–1711), Jesuit priest
- Jacques Bigot (politician) (born 1952), French politician
- Jacques Marie François Bigot (1818–1893), French entomologist
