= Bigot (disambiguation) =

A bigot is someone intolerant of others' differing ideas, races, genders, religions, politics, etc.

Bigot may also refer to:

- Bigot (surname)
- Bigot (espionage)
