= Five Fingers (American TV series) =

American drama adventure series (1959–60)

- Based on: Operation Cicero by Ludwig Carl Moyzisch
- Written by: Ludwig Carl Moyzisch; William Templeton
- Teleplay by: Richard Berg
- Directed by: Andrew McCullough; Montgomery Pittman; Lamont Johnson
- Starring: David Hedison; Luciana Paluzzi; Paul Burke
- Country of origin: United States
- No. of seasons: 1
- No. of episodes: 16

Production
- Producers: Martin Manulis; Herbert B. Swope, Jr.
- Production location: Europe
- Running time: 60 minutes
- Production companies: 20th Century Fox Television; Martin Manulis Productions

Original release
- Network: NBC
- Release: October 3, 1959 – January 8, 1960

Five Fingers is an NBC adventure/drama series set in Europe during the Cold War. It was based on L. C. Moyzich's story "Operation Cicero". It ran from October 3, 1959, to January 9, 1960.

== Premise ==
David Hedison starred as Victor Sebastian, a counter-intelligence agent for the United States. His mission was to infiltrate a Soviet espionage ring; Five Fingers was his code name. Luciana Paluzzi co-starred as Simone Genet, a fashion model. Paul Burke portrayed Robertson, who was the contact person for Sebastian.

Representing the Wembly and Sebastian Ltd. theatrical agency, Sebastian posed as a booking agent who sought musical talent to place in clubs across continental Europe. Genet hoped to become a singer. As they traveled together, a romantic relationship developed, while she knew nothing about his secret spy activities.

== Episodes and guest stars ==
Episodes and notable guest stars include:

- "Station Break" (Eva Gabor and Tyler McVey) – October 3, 1959
- "Dossier" (Edgar Bergen) – October 10, 1959
- "The Moment of Truth" (Nehemiah Persoff and Jack Warden) – October 17, 1959
- "The Unknown Town" (Michael J. Pollard) – October 24, 1959
- "The Men with Triangle Heads" – (Alfred Ryder) October 31, 1959
- "The Assassin" (John McGiver) – November 7, 1959
- "The Man Who Got Away" (Arlene Francis) – November 14, 1959
- "The Emerald Curtain" – November 21, 1959
- "The Temple of the Swinging Doll" (Viveca Lindfors, Clu Gulager, Rodolfo Hoyos, Jr., and Sterling Holloway) – November 28, 1959
- "The Final Dream" (Cesare Danova and John Banner) – December 5, 1959
- "Thin Ice" (Peter Lorre, Brett Halsey, and Alan Young) – December 19, 1959
- "Operation Ramrod" (Ray Anthony) – December 26, 1959
- "The Judas Goat" (Frank de Kova) – January 2, 1960
- "The Search for Edvard Stoyan" (Martin Balsam) – January 9, 1960

Two additional episodes, "A Shot in the Dark" (Neile Adams and Joanna Cook Moore) and "Counterfeit" (Cesar Romero), were unaired.

== UK theatrical runs ==
In 1960/61 in the UK, 20th Century Fox used nine episodes as supporting films for circuit releases, all but one of their own main features:-

- "Final Dream" (BBFC "U" cert Nov. 21 1960) Supporting Rank's The Bulldog Breed, Rank circuit release Dec. 26th 1960
- "Counterfeit" (BBFC "U" cert Nov. 14 1960) Supporting North to Alaska, National circuit release Jan. 1st 1961.
- "The Moment of Truth" (BBFC "U" cert Feb. 23rd 1961). Supporting Five Golden Hours, National circuit release Mar. 12 1961.
- "The Emerald Curtain" (BBFC "U" cert Mar. 20 1961). Supporting All Hands on Deck, National circuit release May 7, 1961.
- "Shot in the Dark" (BBFC "U" cert May 29, 1961). Supporting Return to Peyton Place, Rank circuit release June 26, 1961.
- "Thin Ice" (BBFC "U" cert Jun. 1 1961). Supporting Wild in the Country, Rank circuit release Jul. 30 1961.
- "Dossier" (BBFC "U" cert Jul. 25 1961). Supporting Voyage to the Bottom of the Sea, National circuit release Aug. 28 1961.
- "The Judas Goat" (BBFC "U" cert Oct. 3 1961). Supporting The Queen's Guards, Rank circuit release Oct. 22 1961.
- "Temple of the Swinging Doll" (BBFC "U" cert Nov. 13 1961), Supporting Francis of Assisi, Rank circuit release Dec. 3 1961.

The Rank release played at the prime Odeon and Gaumont cinemas. The National release played at Rank's secondary outlets, although at this time it still was allocated the odd decent booking.

== Production ==
Herbert Bayard Swope Jr. was the producer of the show, which was based on the film 5 Fingers (1952). Robert Stevens was the director, and Richard Berg was the writer. The program was broadcast on Saturdays from 9:30 to 10:30 p.m. Eastern Time. Its competition included The Lawrence Welk Show and Ozark Jubilee on ABC and Have Gun – Will Travel and Gunsmoke on CBS.
