= Prejudice (disambiguation) =

Prejudice is a deprecating regard for the value or worth of a person.

Prejudice may also refer to:

- Prejudice (legal term)
- Prejudice (1949 film)
- Prejudice (1988 film)
- Prejudice (2015 film)

== See also ==
- Bigot (disambiguation)
- Discrimination
