= Michael Wilson (writer) =

American screenwriter (1914–1978)

- Born: July 1, 1914; McAlester, Oklahoma, U.S.
- Died: April 9, 1978 (aged 63); Los Angeles County, California, U.S.
- Spouse: Zelma Wilson (m. 1941)
- Children: 2

Michael Wilson (July 1, 1914 – April 9, 1978) was an American screenwriter known for his work on Lawrence of Arabia (1962), Planet of the Apes (1968), Friendly Persuasion (1956), A Place in the Sun (1951), and The Bridge on the River Kwai (1957). The latter two screenplays won him Academy Awards. His career was interrupted by the Hollywood blacklist, during which time he wrote numerous uncredited screenplays.

== Life and career ==
=== Early life ===
Franklin Michael Wilson Jr. was born on 1 July 1914 in McAlester, Oklahoma. When he was nine, his family relocated, first to a Los Angeles suburb and then to the San Francisco Bay Area. In 1936, he graduated from UC Berkeley with a BA in Philosophy and a minor in English. He stayed at Berkeley for three years of postgraduate study: one as a teaching assistant in English, one on a Theban Fellowship in Creative Literature, and one on a Gayley Fellowship in American History.

Wilson had been a self-described "dilettante" as an undergraduate; it was only during his first year in graduate school that he became politically active and joined the communist movement. With aspirations to be a novelist, he initially experimented with proletarian short stories. He was soon able to sell five of his stories to Esquire and other magazines.

Wilson met architecture student Zelma Gussin at Berkeley; they married in 1941. Zelma's older sister Sylvia was married to Paul Jarrico, who at the time was a fledgling Hollywood screenwriter, as well as being a leftist like Wilson. Zelma encouraged Michael to talk to Jarrico about pursuing screenwriting. Jarrico later recalled, "I preached [to Wilson] the gospel of film as the art form that combines all the other arts, with the greatest possible potential for political influence." Jarrico also told Wilson that if he found he didn't love screenwriting, he could view it merely as a remunerative craft to support his literary career. Wilson took Jarrico's advice and moved to Hollywood in 1940.

=== Becoming a screenwriter ===
To educate himself about movie scripts, Wilson attended as many movies as he could. He meanwhile continued to write and publish short stories. One of them caught the attention of an agent, who helped Wilson land a job at Columbia Pictures. He was paid $100 a week for five weeks' labor on a troubled script that had already passed through 15 other writers. The movie, The Men in Her Life with Loretta Young, was released in 1941 and Wilson received a co-credit. He then got hired at $200 a week by independent producer Harry Sherman to write Hopalong Cassidy westerns featuring actor William Boyd. Wilson's scripts, completed in the first half of 1942, became the films Border Patrol (1943), Colt Comrades (1943), Bar 20 (1943), and Forty Thieves (1944).

Wilson's burgeoning screenwriting career was interrupted by America's entrance into World War II. In August 1942, he enlisted in the U.S. Marine Corps. He trained as a radio analyst and attained the rank of first lieutenant before leaving the Marines in December 1945.

=== After the war ===
Upon returning to civilian life, Wilson worked as a contract screenwriter with Liberty Films. His first notable effort was on It's a Wonderful Life (1946). He was hired as a "polisher" of the script, which was based on the fantasy short story "The Greatest Gift" by Philip Van Doren Stern. After an arbitration by the Screen Writers Guild, the script was credited to Frances Goodrich, Albert Hackett, and director Frank Capra, with "additional scenes" by Jo Swerling. Although Wilson was uncredited, he was acknowledged in the Academy Bulletin as "contributor to screenplay." His wife Zelma recalled that Wilson thought It's a Wonderful Life was a good film, not great: "[Mike] was a disenchanted Catholic, and he was not wild about pictures with angels. I remember him groaning about having to write dialogue with an angel, but he was a professional writer and he did his job."

As his next assignment from Capra, Wilson was tasked with adapting Jessamyn West's The Friendly Persuasion, a short story collection about an Indiana Quaker family forced to examine its pacifist convictions during the American Civil War. While praising Wilson for doing "a swell job" adapting West's book, Capra decided that given the Cold War atmosphere in the late 1940s, "it would be a bad time to produce a picture that might be construed as being antiwar. But we let Wilson work on until he had finished with it." In his subsequent testimony to the House Un-American Activities Committee (HUAC), Wilson would accuse the committee of "beating the drums of war" before adding bitterly, "I feel that this committee might take the credit, or part of it at least, for the fact that The Friendly Persuasion was not produced, in view of the fact that it dealt warmly, in my opinion, with a peace-loving people."

Following his work on Friendly Persuasion, Wilson wrote a screenplay adaptation of Thomas Wolfe's novel Look Homeward, Angel, but it was never produced. He then began an adaptation of Theodore Dreiser's lengthy novel An American Tragedy. The resulting film was titled A Place in the Sun (1951).

=== Blacklisted ===
The year that A Place in the Sun was released was both a high and low point in Wilson's career. Two months after the film was nominated for the Grand Prix du Festival at Cannes in April 1951, Wilson was subpoenaed by the HUAC as a suspected Communist. Upon receiving the subpoena, he notified his employer Twentieth Century-Fox that he would not be cooperating with the committee. He was promptly fired by production chief Darryl Zanuck. In early September, Wilson wrote a friend:

I have been "laid off," which is the studios' temporary euphemism for blacklisting me. There was a time when studios waited until a man was in contempt of Congress before blacklisting him; but today the mere announcement that I have a subpoena and that I oppose this committee's aims costs me my job... [F]reedom of speech is costly these days.

On 20 September 1951, Wilson appeared before the HUAC. Because he took the Fifth Amendment and refused to answer about his alleged Communist Party membership, or name the names of colleagues, he was classified as an "unfriendly witness". Here is an excerpt from his questioning by HUAC Chief Counsel Frank Tavenner and by Congressman Clyde Doyle:

Mr. Tavenner. What knowledge have you of the activities of the Communist Party in the moving-picture industry?
Mr. Wilson. Since that is a question designed to link me with an organization that this committee has called subversive, I shall invoke my privilege and my right under the fifth article of the Bill of Rights and decline to answer that question, and in so doing I wish also to protect the rights of every American citizen to the privacy of belief and association... I think subversion is being committed against the Bill of Rights here today. That is my opinion, sir.
Mr. Doyle. In what way?
Mr. Wilson. I think you are invading the right of American citizens.
Mr. Doyle. We are asking you merely were you ever a member of the Communist Party. Were you ever a member of the Communist Party? I will ask you that. Why don't you tell us honestly? Is there anything subversive about the Communist Party that would involve you in possible criminal prosecution if you ever were a member?
Mr. Wilson. I decline to answer the question, sir, on the same grounds.

Despite being officially blacklisted after his September 1951 testimony, Wilson did not immediately become persona non grata. He was able to accept, along with co-writer Harry Brown, the Academy Award for Best Adapted Screenplay for A Place in the Sun in March 1952. He also won an Edgar Allan Poe Award for Best Motion Picture Screenplay and garnered another Oscar nomination for a script he had written for 5 Fingers (1952). But by that time, the motion picture industry had placed him on the blacklist, where he would remain for 13 years.

=== Salt of the Earth ===
In 1953, Wilson wrote the screenplay for Salt of the Earth (1954), a fictionalized account of a recent strike by zinc miners in Grant County, New Mexico. The movie was made outside the Hollywood studio system by other blacklisted artists, including director Herbert Biberman, producer Paul Jarrico, and actor Will Geer. The screenplay was the product of an unusual working relationship between the screenwriter and the men and women being depicted. Wilson met regularly with the local mining community at public gatherings, sometimes as many as 400 people in attendance. He would read his latest screenplay draft, solicit feedback, incorporate the miners' suggestions, and then repeat the process until all approved of the script.

Because of the film's pro-labor story and its blacklisted cast and crew, it was subject to harassment throughout production and post-production. It was banned from being shown in the U.S. until 1965. Decades later in 1992, after enjoying an underground "cult" status, Salt of the Earth was deemed culturally significant by the United States Library of Congress and selected for preservation in the National Film Registry. When asked in a 1970s interview, which of his screenplays gave him the most satisfaction, Wilson replied:

Probably Salt of the Earth, because I was in control all the way. That is to say, of the script. No one could alter it without my permission; therefore I was more easily persuaded to change it when reason, not power, was brought to bear.

Wilson's comment reflected his long frustration with the studio approach to filmmaking, in which screenwriters didn't have control of the integrity of their work. In the same interview, he said: "Anyone permitted to tamper with a script will certainly do so, including the gaffer and the producer's wife. Most tampering by actors occurs when the producer and/or director are weak and insecure. I have a strange feeling about actors—such respect for the best of them that I expect they'll write better dialogue than my own. They never do." As Paul Jarrico once said about Wilson, "I'm convinced he would have had a happier life as a novelist."

=== Life in exile ===
Following completion of Salt of the Earth, Wilson and his family moved to France to escape the blacklist and McCarthyism. Shortly after they departed, their passports were revoked by the U.S. government so that they could not return to their country. While living abroad, Wilson worked on scripts for the European film industry. He also wrote or collaborated on multiple American film scripts, but under a pseudonym or without credit, and for much less money than he previously earned. Zelma later noted how the family had to live "very modestly" while in exile. Among Wilson's uncredited works that made it to the screen were Carnival Story (1954) for King Brothers Productions (who often used blacklisted writers like Dalton Trumbo); They Were So Young (1954); The Court-Martial of Billy Mitchell (1955) for Otto Preminger; Friendly Persuasion (1956) for William Wyler; The Bridge on the River Kwai (1957) for Sam Spiegel and David Lean; The Two-Headed Spy (1958); La Tempesta (1958) and Five Branded Women (1960) for Dino De Laurentiis; and Lawrence of Arabia (1962) for Spiegel and Lean again. His contributions to Lawrence of Arabia earned him, along with Robert Bolt, the Best British Dramatic Screenplay award from the Writers' Guild of Great Britain.

While the Wilsons were in France, director William Wyler purchased the rights to Friendly Persuasion from Paramount. Wyler liked Wilson's original script from 1947, but he wanted some changes. He employed multiple people – including author Jessamyn West, his brother Robert Wyler, and Harry Kleiner – to make revisions. In the end, the final screenplay was still mostly Wilson's. In accord with blacklist restrictions, Wyler planned to deny Wilson screen credit and only assign it to West and his brother Robert. Wilson was not pleased when he learned about this, and he asked the Writers Guild to arbitrate. According to historian Larry Ceplair:

The arbitration committee awarded Wilson sole credit, but when the movie opened, studio executives took advantage of a clause in the collective bargaining agreement with the Guild, allowing them to refuse credit to a blacklisted writer. ...the only writing credit to appear on the screen read: 'From the book by Jessamyn West.'

As Wilson later observed, "for the first and perhaps only time a Hollywood picture was released that wasn't written by anyone."

Another complication arose when Friendly Persuasion was nominated for a Best Adapted Screenplay Oscar: "In anticipation of the nomination, the Academy of Motion Picture Arts and Sciences adopted a special bylaw barring an award to anyone who had failed to clear himself of charges of past or present membership in the Communist Party. The rule, which did not name Mr. Wilson but was aimed specifically at him, was removed two years later." At the 1957 Academy Awards, Wilson's name was not on the ballot. Instead, Friendly Persuasion was listed last in the Adapted Screenplay category with the wording, "Achievement nominated, but writer ineligible for Award under Academy By-Laws." The award was given that year to Around the World in 80 Days.

Wilson and Carl Foreman worked separately on adapting Pierre Boulle's 1952 French novel The Bridge over the River Kwai, but as Wilson and Foreman were both blacklisted, The Bridge on the River Kwai screenplay credit went to Boulle, who admitted he could not speak or write English.

Wilson remained in France with his family until 1964. At that point, their U.S. passports were restored and they returned to live in Ojai, California.

=== Return to Hollywood ===
After the blacklist was lifted, Wilson continued to write screenplays, including for The Sandpiper (1965), Planet of the Apes (1968), and Che! (1969). Rod Serling did the initial screenplay adaptation of Planet of the Apes, which was based on Pierre Boulle's 1963 science fiction novel. Producer Arthur Jacobs and director Franklin Schaffner were not fully satisfied with Serling's script, believing it needed more political satire. They hired Wilson, who completely rewrote the dialogue and inserted his perspective as a blacklistee. For instance, he converted a scientific hearing into a trial about political heresy, where the apes' chief prosecutor declares: "There is a conspiracy afoot to undermine the very cornerstone of our faith." Serling later acknowledged, "it's really Mike Wilson's screenplay, much more than mine", and Wilson said in a 1972 interview, "[Serling] wrote the first draft screenplay. I wrote the second, third, and final drafts." However, since the surprise ending from Serling's script was retained, Wilson did not contest the decision to grant him a screenwriting co-credit.

Wilson suffered a stroke in 1970 that paralyzed his right hand and arm. He still managed during the next few years to finish several more screenplays—unproduced as of his death—including The Raid On Harper's Ferry, adapted from Truman J. Nelson's book The Old Man: John Brown at Harper's Ferry (1973); The Wobblies about the Industrial Workers of the World; and Outer Darkness about CIA infiltration of the Black Liberation Movement.

In 1976, upon the recommendation of his friend Dalton Trumbo, Wilson received the Writers Guild of America's Laurel Award for lifetime achievement. In his acceptance speech, Wilson spoke about moral choices the audience members might have to face:

I don't want to dwell on the past, but for a few moments to speak of the future. And I address my remarks particularly to you younger men and women who had perhaps not established yourself in this industry at the time of the great witch hunt. I feel that unless you remember this dark epoch and understand it, you may be doomed to replay it. Not with the same cast of characters, of course, or on the same issues. But I see a day perhaps coming in your lifetime, if not in mine, when a new crisis of belief will grip this republic; when diversity of opinion will be labeled disloyalty; and when extraordinary pressures will be put on writers in the mass media to conform to administration policy on the key issues of the time, whatever they may be. If this gloomy scenario should come to pass, I trust that you younger men and women will shelter the mavericks and dissenters in your ranks, and protect their right to work. The Guild will have the use and need of rebels if it is to survive as a union of free writers. This nation will have need of them if it is to survive as an open society.

== Death and legacy ==
Michael Wilson died of a heart attack in 1978 in Los Angeles County, California. He was 63. He was survived by his wife Zelma and their two daughters, Rebecca and Rosanna.

After his death, Wilson began to be recognized for his uncredited work. In December 1984, the Academy of Motion Picture Arts and Sciences unanimously resolved "that the names of Michael Wilson and Carl Foreman be added to that of Pierre Boulle on the credit for best screenplay based on material from another medium for the film Bridge on the River Kwai." In a public ceremony held the following March, Zelma Wilson and Carl Foreman's widow accepted the Oscars on their husbands' behalf. In 1995, Wilson was credited with an Academy Award nomination as co-writer of Lawrence of Arabia. In 1996, the Writers Guild of America West reinstated his credit for Friendly Persuasion.

When a restored version of Lawrence of Arabia was released theatrically in 1989, Wilson was still denied a screen co-credit due to lingering opposition from director David Lean. It required a 1995 decision by the Writers Guild to give Wilson his due. In the DVD editions, and in the 40th anniversary re-release in 2002, Lawrence of Arabia finally says, "Screenplay by Robert Bolt and Michael Wilson".

== Filmography ==
- The Men in Her Life (1941)
- Border Patrol (1943)
- Colt Comrades (1943)
- Bar 20 (1943)
- Forty Thieves (1944)
- It's a Wonderful Life (1946) (uncredited)
- A Place in the Sun (1951)
- 5 Fingers (1952)
- Salt of the Earth (1954)
- Carnival Story (1954) (uncredited)
- They Were So Young (1954) (uncredited)
- The Court-Martial of Billy Mitchell (1955) (uncredited)
- Friendly Persuasion (1956) (originally uncredited)
- The Bridge on the River Kwai (1957) (originally uncredited)
- The Two-Headed Spy (1958) (originally under the pseudonym James O'Donnell)
- La Tempesta (1958) (uncredited)
- Five Branded Women (1960) (originally uncredited)
- Lawrence of Arabia (1962) (originally uncredited)
- The Sandpiper (1965)
- Planet of the Apes (1968)
- Che! (1969)

== Bibliography ==
- Merck, Mandy (2007). Hollywood’s American Tragedies: Dreiser, Eisenstein, Sternberg, Stevens. Oxford: Berg Publishers. ISBN 978-1845206642.
