= Kavass =

Turkish term for an armed guard

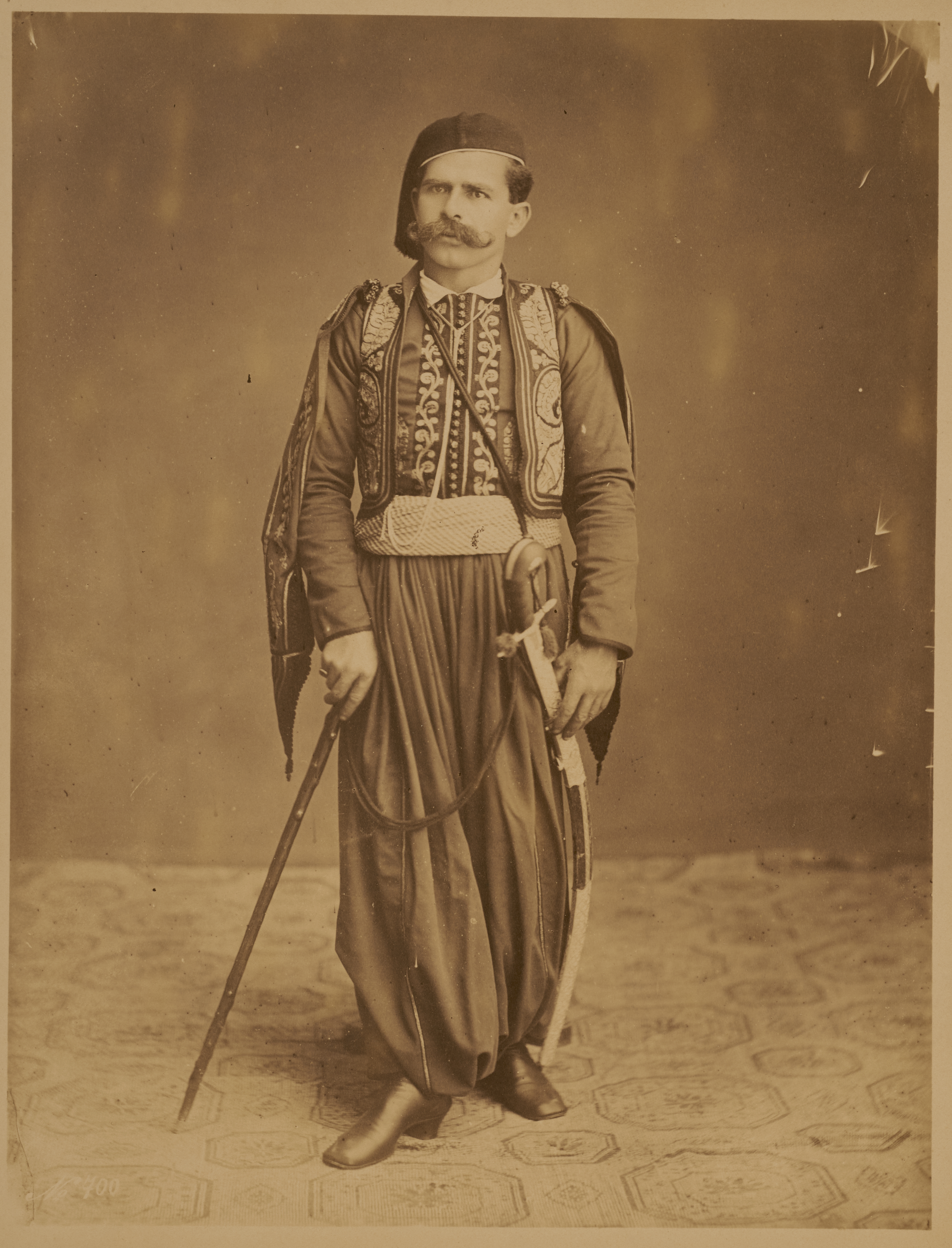
Consular kawass

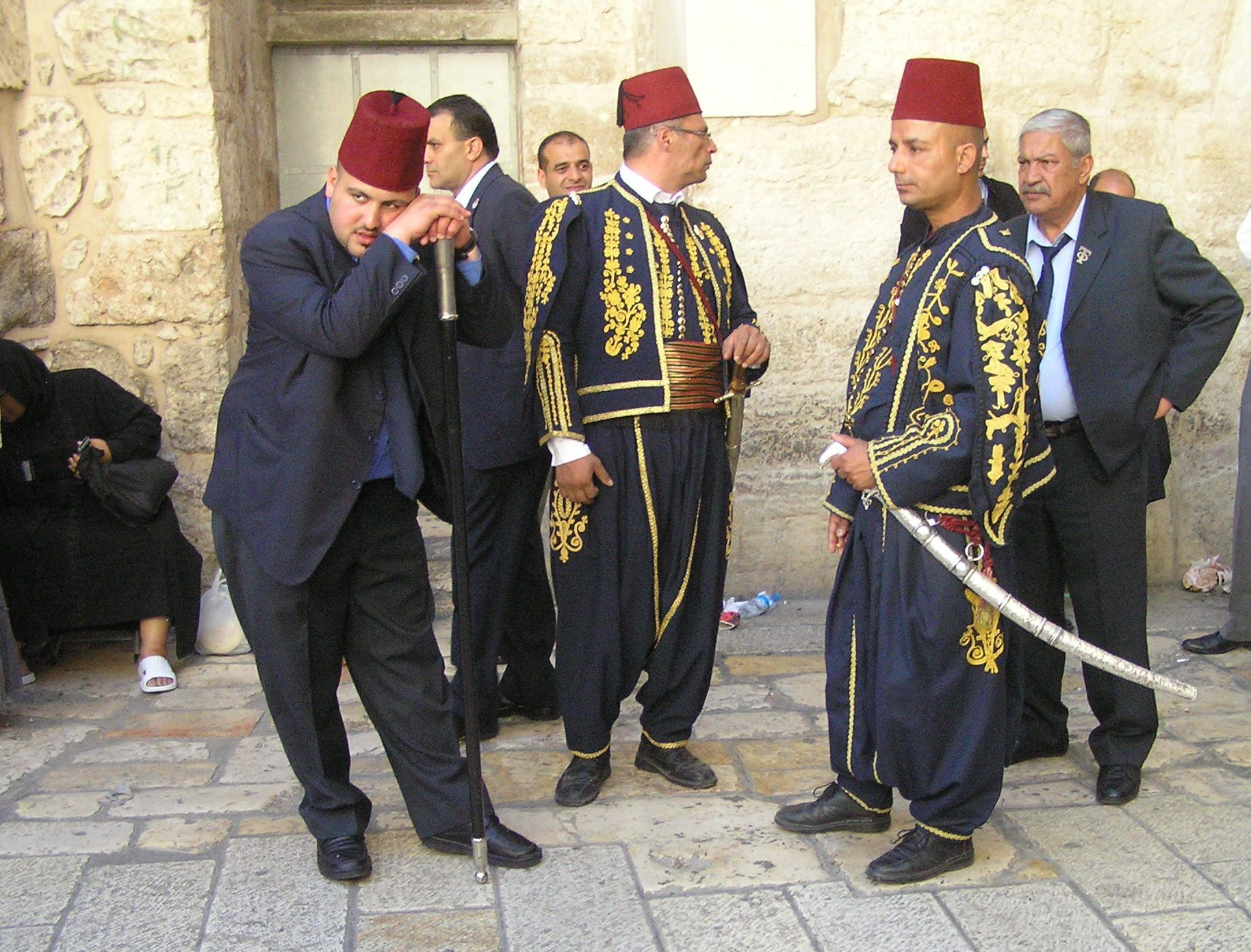
Kawasses at the Church of the Holy Sepulchre in Jerusalem

A kavass or cavass is an Ottoman Turkish term for an armed guard fulfilling various roles, often in the service of local notables and European foreigners of high status or means.

== Etymology ==
The Turkish word is derived from the Arabic qawwās, 'archer', qaws meaning 'bow'.

Kavass is often spelled in English as kawas or kawass, especially in geographical contexts where Arabic exerts an influence on the author.

== Role of the kavass and use of the term ==
The kavass was mainly known as a type of 19th-century Ottoman guard and escort, serving local and foreign dignitaries such as ambassadors and consuls. In Ottoman Palestine, for instance, the right to employ kavasses was a prerogative of the Christian patriarchs (Note: See: Latin Patriarchate of Jerusalem, Greek Orthodox Patriarchate of Jerusalem, and Armenian Patriarchate of Jerusalem) and was only extended to the chief rabbi of the Palestinian Jews in 1842, along with his recognition as the official representative of the community (see millet system). This was quite significant, as a kavass was entitled to strike a misbehaving citizen even if he were a Muslim.

Kavasses preserved public order at the important worship spots of the Holy Land, which was part of the Ottoman Empire from 1516 until 1918, such as the Church of the Holy Sepulchre in Jerusalem and the Church of the Nativity in Bethlehem. They are still employed there but have a primarily ceremonial role, as normal state authorities provide law enforcement.

The 1911 entry in the Encyclopædia Britannica defines the kavass as "an armed police-officer; also for a courier such as it is usual to engage when travelling in Turkey." At the time, "Turkey" would still usually mean the entire declining Ottoman Empire.

More generally, in the words of the famous Nazi spy 'Cicero', by his real name Elyesa Bazna (1904–1970), "in Turkey anyone who serves a foreigner is known as a kavass, a term used especially for servants at foreign embassies."
