= Forty Thieves (film) =

1944 film by Lesley Selander

- Directed by: Lesley Selander
- Written by: Screenplay: Michael Wilson; Bernie Kamins characters created by Clarence E. Mulford
- Produced by: Harry Sherman
- Starring: William Boyd; Andy Clyde; Louise Currie
- Cinematography: Russell Harlan
- Edited by: Carroll Lewis
- Music by: Mort Glickman
- Production company: Harry Sherman Productions
- Distributed by: United Artists
- Release date: June 23, 1944
- Running time: 60 minutes
- Country: United States
- Language: English

Forty Thieves is a 1944 American Western film starring William Boyd in the lead role of Hopalong Cassidy. It was directed by Lesley Selander, produced by Harry Sherman and released by United Artists. This was the last Hopalong Cassidy film that producer Harry Sherman produced for United Artists.

== Plot ==
Hoppy runs for sheriff, but loses to Jerry Doyle when every crook in town votes for Doyle. When Hoppy tries to remove him from office Tad Hammond hires 40 gunslingers to stop him.

Once the outlaws have been stopped Deputy California Carson runs for sheriff.

== Cast ==
- William Boyd as Hopalong Cassidy
- Andy Clyde as Deputy California Carson
- Jimmy Rogers as Deputy Jimmy Rogers
- Douglas Dumbrille as Tad Hammond
- Louise Currie as Katherine Reynolds
- Kirk Alyn as Jerry Doyle
- Herbert Rawlinson as Buck Peters
- Robert Frazer as Judge Reynolds
- Glenn Strange as Ike Simmons
- Hal Taliaferro as Jess Clanton
- Jack Rockwell as Sam Garms
- Bob Kortman as Joe Garms

== See also ==
- List of American films of 1944
