= 5 Fingers =

1952 film by Joseph L. Mankiewicz

- Theatrical release poster
- Directed by: Joseph L. Mankiewicz
- Screenplay by: Michael Wilson; Joseph L. Mankiewicz (uncredited)
- Based on: Der fall Cicero, 1949 novel by Ludwig Carl Moyzisch
- Produced by: Otto Lang
- Starring: James Mason; Danielle Darrieux; Michael Rennie; Walter Hampden; Oskar Karlweis; Herbert Berghof; John Wengraf
- Cinematography: Norbert Brodine
- Edited by: James B. Clark
- Music by: Bernard Herrmann
- Production company: Twentieth Century-Fox
- Distributed by: Twentieth Century-Fox
- Release date: February 22, 1952 (New York)
- Running time: 108 minutes
- Country: United States
- Language: English
- Box office: $1.3 million (U.S./Canadian rentals)

5 Fingers, known also as Five Fingers, is a 1952 American spy film noir directed by Joseph L. Mankiewicz and produced by Otto Lang. The screenplay was written by Michael Wilson based on the 1950 book Operation Cicero (original German: Der Fall Cicero) by Ludwig Carl Moyzisch, Nazi commercial attaché at the German embassy in Ankara, Turkey (1943–44).

The film is based on the true story of Albanian-born Elyesa Bazna, a spy with the code name of Cicero who worked for the Nazis in 1943–44 while he was employed as valet to the British ambassador to Turkey, Sir Hughe Montgomery Knatchbull-Hugessen. Bazna would photograph top-secret documents and deliver the pictures to Franz von Papen, the German ambassador in Turkey and a former German chancellor, using Moyzisch as the intermediary.

James Mason plays Ulysses Diello (Cicero), the character based on Bazna. The film also stars Danielle Darrieux, Michael Rennie, Herbert Berghof and Walter Hampden.

== Plot ==
In neutral Turkey in 1944, German ambassador Franz von Papen converses at a soiree with Countess Anna Staviska, a Frenchwoman and the widow of a pro-German Polish count. Now destitute, the countess volunteers to become a spy for a fee, but her offer is declined.

Ulysses Diello approaches German embassy attaché Moyzisch, offering to provide von Papen with top-secret British documents for £20,000. The Germans do not know that Diello is the valet to British ambassador Sir Frederic Taylor as well as the former valet of the late Polish Count Staviski. The photographed documents taken from Sir Frederic's safe prove to be genuine. Diello is given the code name "Cicero" and asked to continue his subterfuge.

Diello approaches Anna, who has a reputation as a society hostess, to propose that she entertain German diplomats at her villa, where Diello can discreetly conduct his transactions. When the valet confides in Anna his dream of living in South America with her, she slaps his face, making it clear that she still views him as subservient. Nevertheless, Anna agrees to facilitate Diello's activities for financial compensation. He gives his money to Anna for safekeeping, with her to retain a portion of it.

Suspicious of Cicero's true intent, Moyzisch is summoned to Berlin by SS General Kaltenbrunner. Allied bombing of a Romanian oil refinery is executed exactly as Cicero's photographed documents had outlined. Colonel von Richter is sent to Ankara to take command of the negotiations with Cicero, while the British send counterintelligence man Colin Travers to identify the spy.

Anna's newly found wealth and previous willingness to become a spy arouse the suspicion of Travers, who rigs the ambassador's safe with a burglar alarm. When von Richter requests a document detailing an Allied operation called "Overlord", the D-Day invasion plan, Cicero demands £40,000 for it.

At the embassy, Diello overhears Travers and the ambassador discussing that Anna has suddenly departed for Switzerland with £300,000, Diello realizes that Anna has stolen all his money and fled. Anna sends a perfumed letter to Sir Frederic identifying his valet as the spy being paid by the Germans. Diello sees Anna's letter in the ambassador's mail, in the presence of Travers and the Ambassador, and stores it in the safe. Later, Diello removes the fuse for the safe's alarm, opens the safe, photographs the D-Day plans and intercepts the letter. In the interim, a cleaning woman replaces the fuse. When Diello returns the plans to the safe, he triggers the alarm and must flee. Diello realizes that he could soon be killed by one side or captured by the other.

Diello now knows for certain how Anna feels about him. Broke and on the run, Diello demands and receives a £100,000 payment from the Germans for the photographs of the D-Day plans. A second, malicious letter from Anna to the Germans misinforms them that the valet is a British spy, causing them to disregard the D-Day information as unreliable.

Escaping alone to Rio, Diello enjoys a new life of prosperity and freedom until Brazilian authorities arrest him for passing counterfeit currency created during Operation Bernhard. Realizing that Anna's money in Switzerland is also counterfeit she offers him some consolation.

== Cast ==
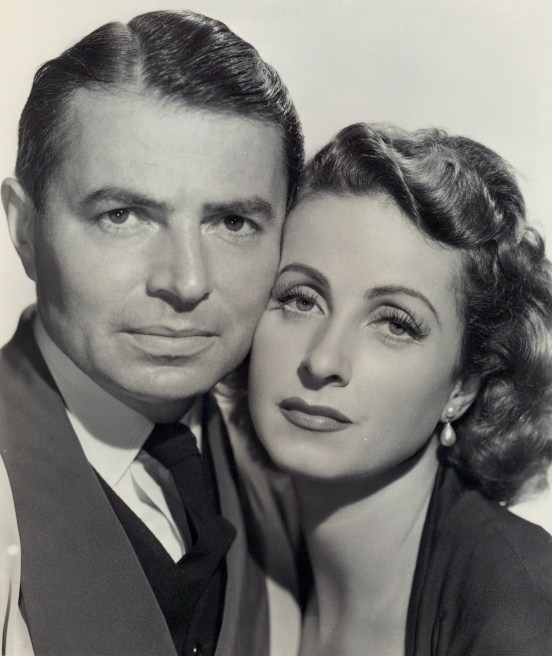
Publicity shot for 5 Fingers with James Mason and Danielle Darrieux

- James Mason as Ulysses Diello
- Danielle Darrieux as Countess Anna Staviska
- Michael Rennie as Colin Travers
- Walter Hampden as Sir Frederic Taylor
- Oskar Karlweis as L. C. Moyzisch
- Herbert Berghof as Colonel von Richter
- John Wengraf as Count Franz von Papen
- Ben Astar as Siebert (as A. Ben Astar)
- Roger Plowden as Keith McFadden

== Production ==
Location filming in Turkey had been planned but was canceled, as studios were becoming hesitant to shoot films abroad because of the high expense. However, director Joseph L. Mankiewicz traveled to Turkey with a film crew for exterior and background filming in Ankara, including Franz von Papen's original Mercedes-Benz limousine, which Mankiewicz located in Istanbul. While in Turkey, Mankiewicz spoke with Ludwig Carl Moyzisch by phone, and Moyzisch emerged from hiding to secretly observe Mankiewicz's filming. However, when authorities learned that Mankiewicz had been in contact with Moyzisch, they tried to prevent Mankiewicz from leaving the country with the film. The ordeal required the intercession of the highest levels of the Turkish government to permit Mankiewicz to depart Turkey with the film.

The studio recruited a technical advisor to teach James Mason a bit of the Turkish language, but Mason had learned enough conversational Turkish while spending five months in Turkey making Secret of Stamboul (1936) that the advisor's services were not necessary.

== Release ==
The film opened at the Roxy Theatre in New York on February 22, 1952 and set an opening-day house record as part of a $90,000 opening weekend.

== Reception ==
Bosley Crowther of The New York Times wrote: "Those who may fear that the old days of silken spy films are as dead as the gone days of diamond tiaras and princely diplomacy can now settle back in the comfort and the tingling satisfaction to be had from Twentieth Century Fox 'Five Fingers' ... For here, in this literate entertainment Joseph L. Mankiewicz has made with a cast that might well have been recruited at an embassy function in pre-war Berlin, is as dandy an espionage thriller as ever went through the polished hands of a Grahame Greene or an Alfred Hitchcock—or for that matter, an E. P. Oppenheim." In December 1952, Crowther listed 5 Fingers as one of the year's top ten films.

William Brogdon of Variety criticized the film's length, but called the picture "a good if somewhat overlong cloak-and-dagger thriller".

Harrison's Reports called 5 Fingers a "good espionage melodrama, superbly directed and acted" but concluded: "The first two-thirds of the picture is slowed down by excessive dialogue; it is only in the last third that the spectator's attention is held tense. The photography is clear, but in a somewhat low key."

Time magazine characterized Mankiewicz's direction as "too heavy-handed for this light-fingered subject", believing that the film adaptation "stresses screenplay rather than gunplay".

== Awards ==
Award	Category	Nominee(s)	Result	Ref.
Academy Awards	Best Director	Joseph L. Mankiewicz	Nominated	
Academy Awards	Best Screenplay	Michael Wilson	Nominated	
Directors Guild of America Awards	Outstanding Directorial Achievement in Motion Pictures	Joseph L. Mankiewicz	Nominated	
Edgar Allan Poe Awards	Best Motion Picture	Michael Wilson and Otto Lang	Won	
Golden Globe Awards	Best Screenplay – Motion Picture	Michael Wilson	Won	
National Board of Review Awards	Top Ten Films		Fourth Place	
Writers Guild of America Awards	Best Written American Drama	Michael Wilson	Nominated	

== Adaptation ==
5 Fingers was adapted into a 1959–1960 16-episode television series titled Five Fingers, starring David Hedison and Luciana Paluzzi.
