= Ludwig Carl Moyzisch =

Turkish Nazi Party officer

Ludwig Carl Moyzisch (born 1902 or 1905, d. ?) was an SS-Sturmbannführer and diplomatic attaché of the Nazi German Embassy in Ankara, Turkey in 1940–1944. Under this cover, he led the work of the German secret services in Turkey, which included handling Elyesa Bazna, codename 'Cicero'. Moyzisch wrote the book Operation Cicero in part to explain his role and activities working for the Sicherheitsdienst (SD). The book was subsequently adapted into the film 5 Fingers, starring James Mason as the spy.

== Biography ==
Moyzisch was born in Austria, and raised under the Catholic faith. His maternal grandmother was Jewish, which made him a second degree Mischling [mixed race]. (Note: Ironically, according to Jewish religious law, Moyzisch's mother, and through her himself and his sister, were Jewish by descent from his maternal grandmother.) Moyzisch was a journalist for the "Wiener Neueste Nachrichten" in Vienna, prior to becoming a member of Nazi Germany's intelligence services during World War II.

Although Moyzisch had some Jewish heritage, he was still accepted into the Nazi Sicherheitsdienst (SD). This was accomplished in part by him becoming a member of the Nazi Party in 1932.

Starting from 1938, he was the Press Officer of the Reichsstatthalter (Reich Governor) Office in Vienna.

Between 1940–1944, Moyzisch held the official title of assistant commercial attaché in Ankara, while secretly working there as head of the intelligence office, first as chief of the Sicherheitsdienst (SD) office - Himmler's Reich Security Main Office (RSHA) ran the SD, which had a foreign department - and later for the RSHA's Referat VI C 12, in charge of Turkey, Iran and Afghanistan. He reported to Walter Schellenberg while in Ankara during 1941–1944. Moyzisch lived in Ankara with his wife and son, but he was unable to get his mother and sister out of Germany. Schellenberg and Himmler were quite impressed by the efficient, professional, and friendly manner in which he worked. An SS officer intervened when an anonymous letter was sent to the regime stating that Moyzisch was part Jewish.

== Cicero Affair ==
'Cicero' is the SD code name given by the Germans to Elyesa Bazna, a valet for the British ambassador Sir Hughe Knatchbull-Hugessen in the city of Ankara in Turkey, a neutral country during most part of World War II.

The information that he leaked is believed to have been potentially among the more damaging disclosures made by a Second World War spy but conflicts inside the highest echelons of the German government meant that little if any of it was acted upon.

== After the war ==
In May 1945, after the end of World War II, Moyzisch went into hiding in Austria but two months later he was tracked down by the British services. He was aggressively interviewed by the Allies and gave witness during war trials at Nuremberg, after which he went back to his journalistic activity and wrote a book to address rumors and explain his role during the war. He was never charged with a war crime.

== Operation Cicero ==
Moyzisch published his memoirs in 1950 with a book named Operation Cicero. (Note: Both books by Bazna and Moyzisch had "factual errors", according to Jefferson Adams.) Richard Wires, author of The Cicero Spy Affair stated that he found the book to be a "sensational narrative" with misrepresentations and omissions. Wires speculated that Moyzisch may not have known that Bazna was still alive. Franz von Papen and Allen Dulles, wartime head of the OSS, suggested that there was more to the story than what had emerged in the book. Neither elaborated. Twelve years later, in 1962, I was Cicero was published by 'Cicero' himself.

A film based on the book Operation Cicero by L.C. Moyzisch was released by 20th Century Fox in 1952. It was titled 5 Fingers and directed by Joseph L. Mankiewicz. Bazna, renamed Ulysses Diello, was played by James Mason.

== Later years ==
Moyzisch returned to Austria where he wrote his book and worked as a businessman.

== External sources ==
=== Photos of L. C. Moyzisch ===
- "[Portrait from book about Cicero]". publ.lib.ru. 12 July 2015.
- "[Portrait from Moyzisch's "author page" for Operation Cicero book]". librarything.com. 12 July 2015.
- "[Portrait]". Axis History Forum. 12 July 2015.
- "[Supposed photos of Elyesa Bazna and Ludwig Carl Moyzisch]". superstoria.it. 12 July 2015.
