= Zelma Wilson =

American architect (1918–1996)

- Born: Zelma Gussin; November 23, 1918; New York City, New York, U.S.
- Died: May 10, 1996 (aged 77)
- Occupation: Architect
- Spouse(s): Michael Wilson, m. 1941-1978; his death)
- Children: 2
- Family: Paul Jarrico (brother in-law)

Zelma Wilson, née Gussin (November 23, 1918 – May 10, 1996), was an American architect, practicing mainly in California.

== Early life and education ==
Zelma Gussin was born in New York City, the daughter of Russian Jewish immigrants. She and her older sister were raised in Santa Paula, California, by their mother Rose (a shopkeeper) and their stepfather, Ed Kraus. She graduated from Santa Paula Union High School, where she played on the tennis team. She majored in art at the University of California Berkeley and later studied at the California Institute of Technology. At the USC School of Architecture, she was the only woman in her 1947 graduating class.

== Career ==
In 1948 she worked as a draftsperson at the Los Angeles City Planning Department. She moved to France with her family after her husband was blacklisted in 1952. In Paris, Zelma pursued her interest in sculpture at the École des Beaux-Arts. She earned her architecture license in 1957, and worked with Richard Neutra, Victor Gruen, Rudolph Schindler, and Raphael Soriano. The Wilsons settled in Ojai upon returning to California in 1964.

Zelma Wilson opened her architectural practice in Ojai, Zelma Wilson and Associates, AIA, in 1967. Wilson primarily designed community buildings such as schools, churches, and libraries (see list of works below), but she also designed private residences, banks, and at least one bridge. She served as president of the Ventura County branch of the AIA in 1977. In 1983 she was named a Fellow of the American Institute of Architects.

In addition to her architectural firm, Wilson lectured on architecture at Cal Poly San Luis Obispo. She also served on the California State Governors Emergency Task Force on Earthquake Preparedness, and was active in Ojai organizations, including the "Ojai Beautiful" conference, Ojai Downtown Redevelopment, the Ojai Historical Preservation Commission, and the Ojai Valley Performing Arts Theater. In 1994, she received the City of Ojai's "Lifetime Achievement in the Arts Award." In 1978 she traveled to China with a group of California architects and engineers at the invitation of the Architectural Society of China, to work on structural issues in earthquake-prone regions.

== Partial list of works ==
The following buildings or structures were among those designed by Zelma Wilson:

- Ojai Branch Bank of America Bank of America; Ojai, CA (1956)
- Peck residence; Ventura, CA (1973-1974)
- Simi Valley Public Library; Simi, Valley CA (1979)
- Ojai City Hall; Ojai, CA (1976)
- Meditation Mount educational center; Ojai, CA (1971)
- Iwata Garden Center; Ojai, CA (1967)
- Oak Grove Elementary School; Ojai, CA
- Villanova Preparatory School Gymnasium; Ojai, CA
- Ojai Valley Athletic Club; Ojai, CA
- The Thacher School/Thacher School; Ojai, CA (1987-1989)
- Stroberg/Patterson residence; Ojai, CA (1989-1991)

== Personal life ==
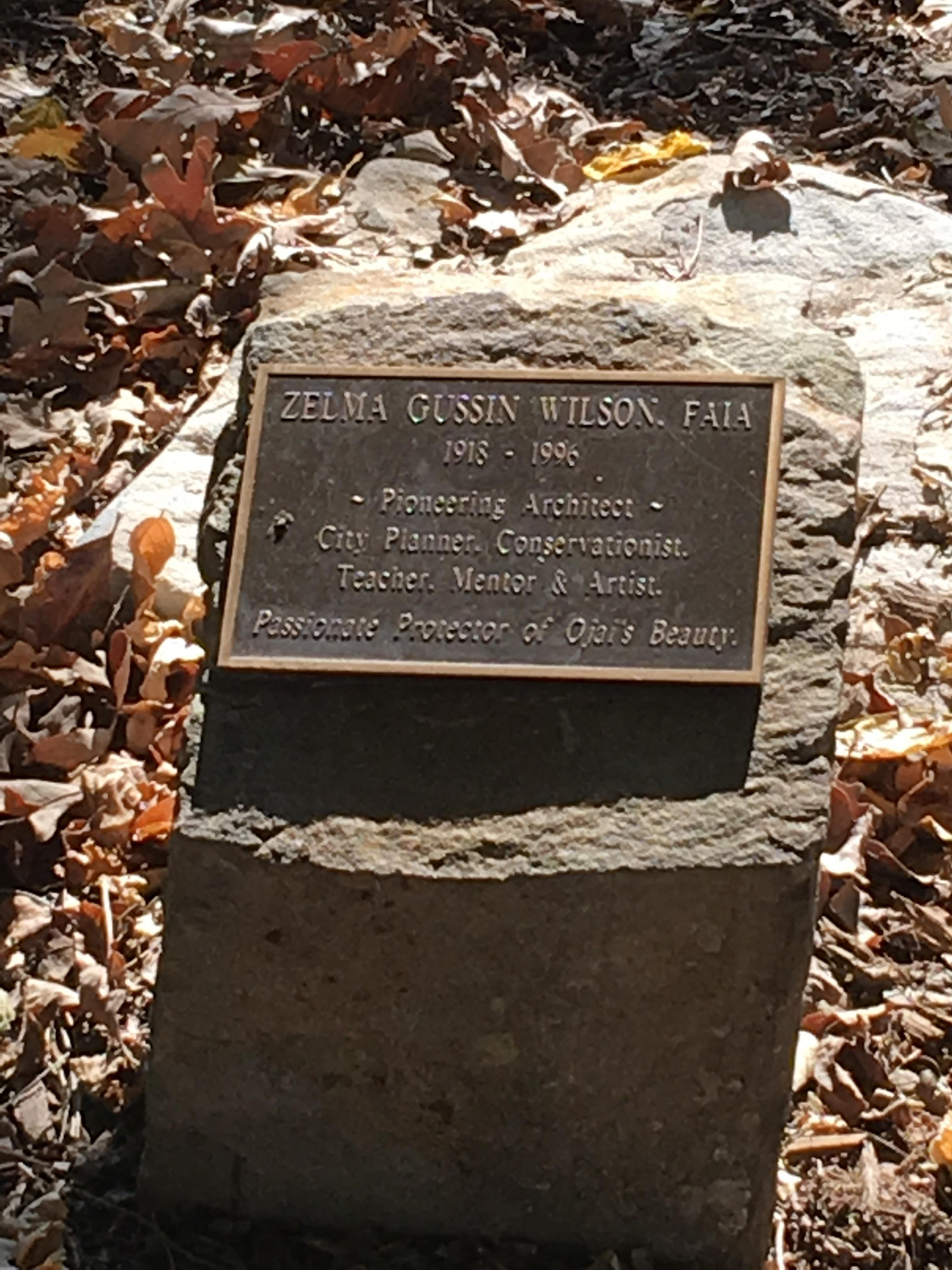
A plaque in Ojai's Libbey Park, dedicating a tree to the memory of Zelma Gussin Wilson.

Zelma Gussin married screenwriter Michael Wilson in 1941; the couple had two daughters together. Her older sister Sylvia was married to Paul Jarrico, another blacklisted screenwriter. Zelma and Michael Wilson were members of the American Communist Party from 1938 until early 1956.

Zelma Wilson was widowed in 1978. As Michael Wilson's widow, she was presented with his posthumous Academy Award in 1985. She died in 1996, days before she was scheduled to be an honored guest of the Ojai Film Society.

== Legacy ==
Zelma Wilson's professional papers are held at Virginia Polytechnic Institute and State University in Blacksburg. She appears in the 1987 television documentary "Legacy of the Hollywood Blacklist," discussing her family's experience of the blacklist.

There is a plaque in Libbey Park in Ojai, dedicating a nearby tree to "Zelma Gussin Wilson, FAIA, 1918–1996, Pioneering Architect, City Planner, Conservationist, Teacher, Mentor, & Artist. Passionate Protector of Ojai's Beauty."
