= François Bigot (royal notary) =

François Bigot (French: [fʁɑ̃swa biɡo]; c. 1643 – 28 October 1708) was a farmer and a seigneurial attorney as well as a royal notary and court officer in New France.

Bigot arrived in Canada with his parents around 1662 where his father was a farmer at Cap-de-la-Madeleine. From this experience he became a farmer in his own right and pursued this vocation during most of his life.

By 1702, he held official positions including being a court officer in Trois-Rivières. In 1704 he was referred to as the seigneurial attorney of the Champlain seigneury. He was a notary from 1702 until his death.
