= Hughe Knatchbull-Hugessen =

British diplomat, civil servant and author (1886–1971)

Sir Hughe Knatchbull-Hugessen KCMG
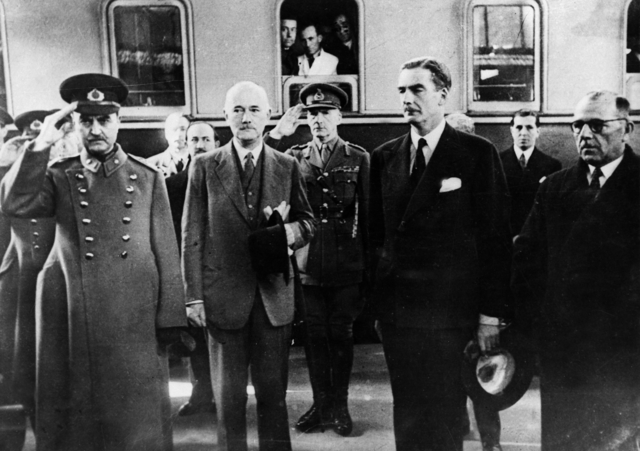
- Sir Hughe Knatchbull-Hugessen (second from left), while British Ambassador to Turkey, next to Anthony Eden, April 1941

Personal details
- Born: 26 March 1886 Chelsea, London, England
- Died: 21 March 1971 (aged 84) Bridge, Kent, England
- Education: Balliol College, Oxford
- Occupation: Diplomat
- Nickname: Snatch

Sir Hughe Montgomery Knatchbull-Hugessen KCMG (26 March 1886 – 21 March 1971) was a British diplomat, civil servant and author. He is best remembered as the diplomat whose secrets were stolen by his valet and passed to Nazi Germany during the Cicero spy affair.

== Background and education ==
He was the second son of Reverend Reginald Bridges Knatchbull-Hugessen, son of Sir Edward Knatchbull, 9th Baronet, and his second wife Rachel Mary, daughter of Admiral Sir Alexander Montgomery, 3rd Baronet. At school, he was known as "Snatch", a nickname that stayed with him for life. He was educated at Eton College and Balliol College, Oxford, where he graduated BA in 1907. In 1908, he joined the Foreign Office.

== Career ==
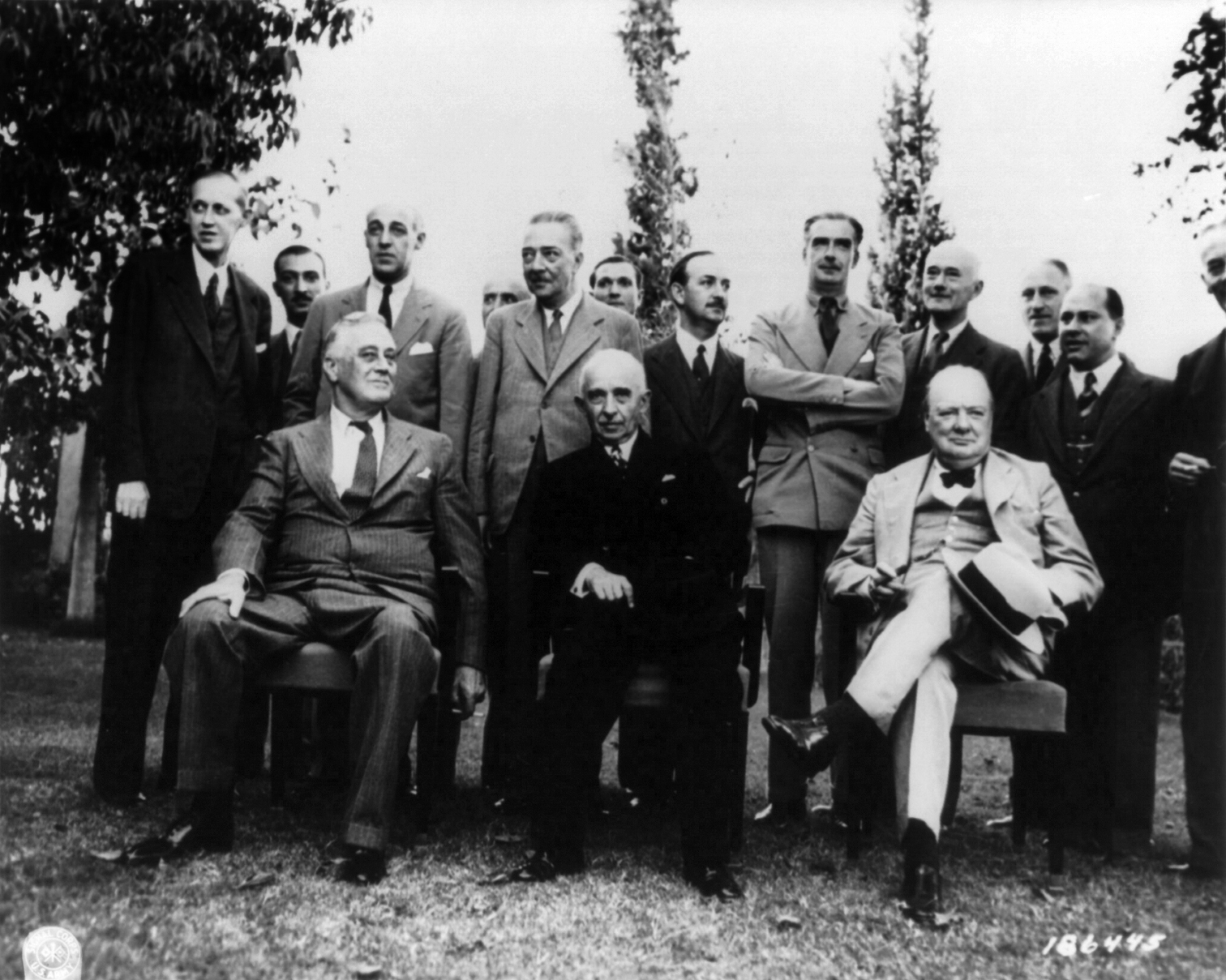
British Ambassador to Turkey Sir Hughe Knatchbull-Hugessen behind Winston Churchill during the Second Cairo Conference.

He was appointed attaché in 1909 and posted to Constantinople. During the First World War, he worked in the contraband department. Following the 1918 merger of the Foreign and Diplomatic Services, he became eligible for broader postings. Promoted to first secretary, he joined the British delegation at the Versailles Conference in January 1919, and was appointed Companion of the Order of St Michael and St George (CMG) in the 1920 New Year Honours.

After postings in The Hague and Paris, he served as counsellor in Brussels from 1926 to 1930. In 1931, he became Envoy Extraordinary and Minister Plenipotentiary to the Republics of Estonia, Latvia, and Lithuania, stationed at Riga. He was later posted to Tehran as envoy to Persia. In 1936, he was appointed Knight Commander of the Order of St Michael and St George (KCMG), and later that year became Ambassador to China.

In 1937, while travelling between Nanking and Shanghai, he was seriously wounded when his car was strafed by a Japanese fighter aircraft. He was the only passenger hit and narrowly avoided paralysis. The attack caused an international diplomatic incident.

After recovering, he was appointed Ambassador to Turkey in 1939. There, he competed for diplomatic influence with the German ambassador, Franz von Papen. In 1943, he took part in secret negotiations with Hungary. On 9 September 1943, aboard a yacht in the Sea of Marmara, he concluded a preliminary armistice with Hungarian diplomat László Veress. The agreement became void when Soviet troops reached Hungary first.

Between November 1943 and March 1944, his Kosovar Albanian valet, Elyesa Bazna (codenamed "Cicero"), photographed top-secret British documents and sold them to Nazi Germany. Sir John Dashwood later revealed that Bazna accessed documents during the ambassador's daily piano practice or while he was in the bathroom. Despite the resulting scandal, Knatchbull-Hugessen's career continued and he was appointed Ambassador to Belgium and Minister to Luxembourg in 1944, retiring in 1947.

== Family ==
On 16 July 1912, he married Mary Gordon-Gilmour (1890–1978), daughter of Brigadier-General Sir Robert Gilmour, 1st Baronet. They had three children, their daughter Elisabeth Knatchbull-Hugessen (1915–1957), married Sir George Young, her father's private secretary, who had saved her life during the 1937 attack in China. Their son is the Conservative politician Sir George Young.

== Works ==
- Diplomat in Peace and War (1949)
- Kentish Family (1960)

== Popular culture ==
- 5 Fingers (1952), a film based on the Cicero affair. Knatchbull-Hugessen is fictionalised as Sir Frederic Taylor, played by Walter Hampden.
- Operation Cicero (2019), a Turkish historical film. Tamer Levent plays Knatchbull-Hugessen.

== Footnotes ==
Diplomatic posts
Preceded by Joseph Addison	Envoy Extraordinary and Minister Plenipotentiary to the Republics of Estonia, Latvia and Lithuania; 1930–1934	Succeeded by Edmund Monson
Preceded by Sir Reginald Hoare	Envoy Extraordinary and Minister Plenipotentiary to Persia; 1934–1936	Succeeded by Sir Horace Seymour
Preceded by Sir Alexander Cadogan	Ambassador Extraordinary and Plenipotentiary to China; 1936–1937	Succeeded by Archibald Clark Kerr
Preceded by Sir Percy Loraine, 12th Bt	Ambassador Extraordinary and Plenipotentiary to the Turkish Republic; 1939–1944	Succeeded by Sir Maurice Peterson
Preceded by None due to World War II	Ambassador Extraordinary and Plenipotentiary to Belgium; 1944–1947	Succeeded by Sir George Rendel
Preceded by None due to World War II	Envoy Extraordinary and Minister Plenipotentiary to Luxembourg; 1944–1947	Succeeded by Sir George Rendel
