= Vincent Bigot =

French priest

Vincent Bigot (French: [vɛ̃sɑ̃ biɡo]; 15 May 1649, in Bourges – 7 September 1720, in Paris) was a French Jesuit priest and a missionary in Canada.

== Life history ==
Vincent Bigot, like his brother Jacques, was sent to the Algonkin mission at Sillery upon his arrival in Canada in 1680.

Bigot was important to the Jesuit mission in Canada. By 1704 he was superior general of their missions in that jurisdiction. In 1713 he returned to France to become the procurator of Canadian missions. He held this position until his death.
