= George Elsey =

American presidential advisor

George McKee Elsey (February 5, 1918 – December 30, 2015) was an American naval commander who was an advisor to Presidents Franklin D. Roosevelt and Harry S. Truman. He also served as a speechwriter and political strategist for Truman during the 1948 election.

== Life ==
Elsey was born in Palo Alto, California and was raised in Oakmont, Pennsylvania. He studied history at Princeton University and Harvard University.

A commander in the U.S. Naval Reserve, he was a duty officer in the White House Map Room, 1941–46, accompanying Truman to the Potsdam Conference; Assistant to Clark Clifford, the Special Counsel to the President, 1947–49; Administrative Assistant to the President, 1949–51; and Assistant to the Director, Mutual Security Agency, 1951-53. Having served as Vice-President of the organization between 1958 and 1961, Elsey became President of the American Red Cross in 1970, serving in that post until 1982. He died in Tustin, California on December 30, 2015. He provided an oral history to the Truman Presidential Library in July 1969.

His participation in Truman's 1948 campaign was documented in Race for the White House, which included interviews with Elsey. The episode aired a few months after Elsey died.

George Elsey's papers are curated by the Franklin D. Roosevelt Presidential Library and Museum, Hyde Park, New York.

== Works ==
- George M. Elsey (2005). An Unplanned Life: A Memoir. University of Missouri Press. pp. 144–. ISBN 978-0-8262-6488-6.
