= BIGOT list =

List of personnel possessing appropriate security clearance

A BIGOT list (or bigot list) is a list of personnel possessing appropriate security clearance and who are cleared to know details of a particular operation, or other sensitive information.

== Etymology ==
There are two slightly differing, but related, etymologies for the origin of the term:

One common etymology is that BIGOT is a reversal of the codewords "TO GIB", meaning "To Gibraltar". The context of this etymology is the Allied invasion of North Africa in November 1942: "TO GIB" was stamped on the orders of military and intelligence staff travelling from Britain to North Africa to prepare for the operation. The majority of personnel made a dangerous journey by sea, through areas patrolled by German U-boats, however certain individuals whose contribution to the campaign or whose mission was vital were classified "BIGOT", and were flown to Africa on a safer route via Gibraltar.

Several sources state that BIGOT was a codeword for Operation Overlord, the Western Allies' plan to invade German-occupied western Europe during World War II, and that the term was an acronym for "British Invasion of German Occupied Territory". However, the term "BIGOT", used to designate the highest level of military secrecy, appeared on amphibious operations planning documents prior to Operation Overlord. See, for example, the BIGOT map created for use in Operation Husky, the invasion of Sicily, which took place in 1943, preceding Operation Overlord, which occurred in 1944. This map is referenced on the British Imperial War Museum site. It is possible that the term itself, supposedly suggested by Winston Churchill, was a "backronym"—a phrase created to fit an acronym such as the existing "To Gibraltar" code.

The list of personnel cleared to know details of Overlord was known as the BIGOT list, and the people on it were known as "Bigots". The details of the invasion plan were so secret, adherence to the list was rigidly enforced. U.S. military advisor George Elsey tells a story in his memoirs about how a junior officer turned away King George VI from the intelligence centre on the USS Ancon, because, as he explained to a superior officer "...nobody told me he was a Bigot."

Although both derivations are of British origin, the term is widely used in the United States intelligence agencies.

== See also ==
- Sensitive Compartmented Information
