= Jacques Bigot (Jesuit) =

Jacques Bigot (French: [ʒak biɡo]; 26 July 1651 – April 1711) was a Jesuit priest who arrived in Canada in 1679 as a missionary to the Abenakis.

Bigot's first mission posting was at Sillery, Quebec, where the Abenakis had fled from the English. By 1683 he had relocated them to a site on the Chaudière River which had been granted to him by the Governor General of New France, Antoine Lefèbvre de La Barre.

His brother, Vincent Bigot was active in the missions at the same time and rose to the position of superior general and, subsequently, the procurator of Canadian missions.
