= Suicide of Eden Knight =

Suicide of a trans woman

Eden Knight
- Knight in January 2023
- Born: March 8, 2000; Saudi Arabia
- Died: March 12, 2023 (aged 23); Saudi Arabia
- Cause of death: Suicide

Eden Knight (March 8, 2000 – March 12, 2023) was a Saudi Arabian trans woman living in the United States who died by suicide on or around March 12, 2023. According to her suicide note, which she posted on Twitter, Knight had been coerced into returning to her family in Saudi Arabia, who forced her to detransition.

== Background ==
Eden Knight was born in Saudi Arabia. Her father, Fahad Al-Shathri, is a Saudi financier who worked at the International Monetary Fund for five years and has been Deputy Governor for Supervision at Saudi Central Bank since June 2018.

Knight attended high school in the Washington metropolitan area as well as an international school in Riyadh, and subsequently enrolled at George Mason University to study computer science. After moving to the United States for university, and during the COVID-19 pandemic, Knight came out as transgender and became involved online with members of the trans community. She was described by friends as intelligent, well-read, and hoping to become an advocate for trans people, particularly in Saudi Arabia, whose government does not recognize LGBTQ rights. She was a fan of the Swedish rapper Bladee.

In February 2022, Knight lost her student housing at George Mason University. Her international scholarship reportedly ran out before she could graduate, resulting in the expiration of her visa; she intended to claim political asylum in the United States. Knight went to stay in Georgia with an American couple who hoped that she would be able to live with them after being granted asylum. She grew close to them and got along well with their son; the family got her a bracelet with the word "aunt" on it as a gift. The same year, Knight began feminizing hormone therapy.

== Forced detransition and return to Saudi Arabia ==
In August 2022, Knight was contacted by two American fixers hired by her parents. These individuals, identified as Michael Pocalyko and Ellen Cole, (Note: The CEO and managing director of the D.C.-area private intelligence agency Special Investigations.) promised that they would be able to help her fix her relationship with her parents and also assist with her immigration status. Some of Knight's friends grew suspicious when Pocalyko, in a phone call that they overheard, complimented risqué photographs of her that he had found online. Pocalyko also reportedly prevented Knight's friends from being involved in their plans, demanding to only communicate with Knight herself.

In October 2022, the fixers persuaded Knight to travel to Washington, D.C., where she hoped to get her asylum granted. She was met at the train station by Pocalyko, Cole, and a Saudi attorney named Bader, (Note: Subsequently identified as Bader Alomair, an employee of the Saudi embassy.) who took her to a hotel. Once there, Bader was initially hospitable but over the course of days became more coercive, showing her pictures of "feminine men" and attempting to intimidate her into detransitioning. Knight feared if she did not comply, her undocumented immigration status would be used against her. Bader also incorrectly informed her that she would not be able to apply for asylum in the United States and would need to return to Saudi Arabia. After being forced to adopt a more masculine appearance and being confronted with her parents, she was flown back to Saudi Arabia in December.

While in Saudi Arabia, Knight's family confiscated her passport and money to keep her from fleeing. She attempted to secretly continue hormone therapy but her parents routinely searched her belongings and found her hormones multiple times. After one such confrontation, her parents admitted to hiring Pocalyko, Cole, and Bader to get her back to Saudi Arabia from the United States.

== Death ==
On March 12, 2023, Knight posted a suicide note to Twitter describing her parents' actions over the previous year. Her tweet had received 31 million views as of March 17. Knight's death was confirmed the following day in tweets from her family stating "Go to the mercy of God Almighty, young man" and repeatedly deadnaming her.

== Reactions ==
Members of the trans community online and personal friends of Knight compiled a Google Doc commemorating her life and outlining the allegations against those involved in her death. The Twitter account affiliated with her family went private after a flood of replies noting, "Her name was Eden." The hashtag #JusticeForEden was used on Twitter to pay tribute to her and call for action in the aftermath of her suicide.

Trans writer Jaclyn Moore linked Knight's death to recent incidents of violence against transgender people, specifically the killings of Cashay Henderson and Brianna Ghey. Eli Erlick publicly criticized Michael Pocalyko's involvement in the case. U.S. Representative Cori Bush quoted Knight's message and noted "may she rest in power" in a post on Twitter. Wajeeh Lion, a queer Saudi activist who was granted asylum in the United States in 2018, stated that Knight's death was part of a larger trend in Saudi repression of the LGBTQ+ community and noted that Wajeeh's own parents had attempted similar tactics as Knight's parents had allegedly done. L'Orient-Le Jour compared Knight's situation with that of Sarah Hegazi, an LGBTQ+ activist from Egypt who died by suicide in Canada.

On March 23, 2023, protesters gathered outside the Saudi Embassy in Dublin to demand justice for Knight. The next day, activists protested outside the Embassy of Saudi Arabia, London in memory of Knight and to draw attention to Saudi Arabia's persecution of LGBTQ+ individuals.

Vice News quoted a spokesman from the U.S. State Department as saying, "We have seen these reports and are studying these allegations," in reference to the incident. An investigation from the BBC World Service connected the Saudi attorney Bader Alomair to previous cases in which the Saudi government allegedly made use of his services to covertly extract Saudi nationals facing judicial proceedings in the United States.

== See also ==
- Legal status of transgender people
- LGBTQ rights by country or territory
- LGBTQ rights in Saudi Arabia
- LGBTQ rights in the United States
- List of LGBT-related suicides
- Mental health of LGBTQ people
- Suicide among LGBTQ people
- Suicide in Saudi Arabia
- Suicide in the United States
- Transgender rights in the United States
