= Indecent exposure =

Public indecency involving nudity

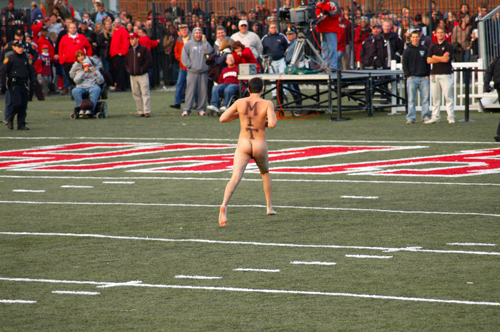
Streaking is a type of indecent exposure.

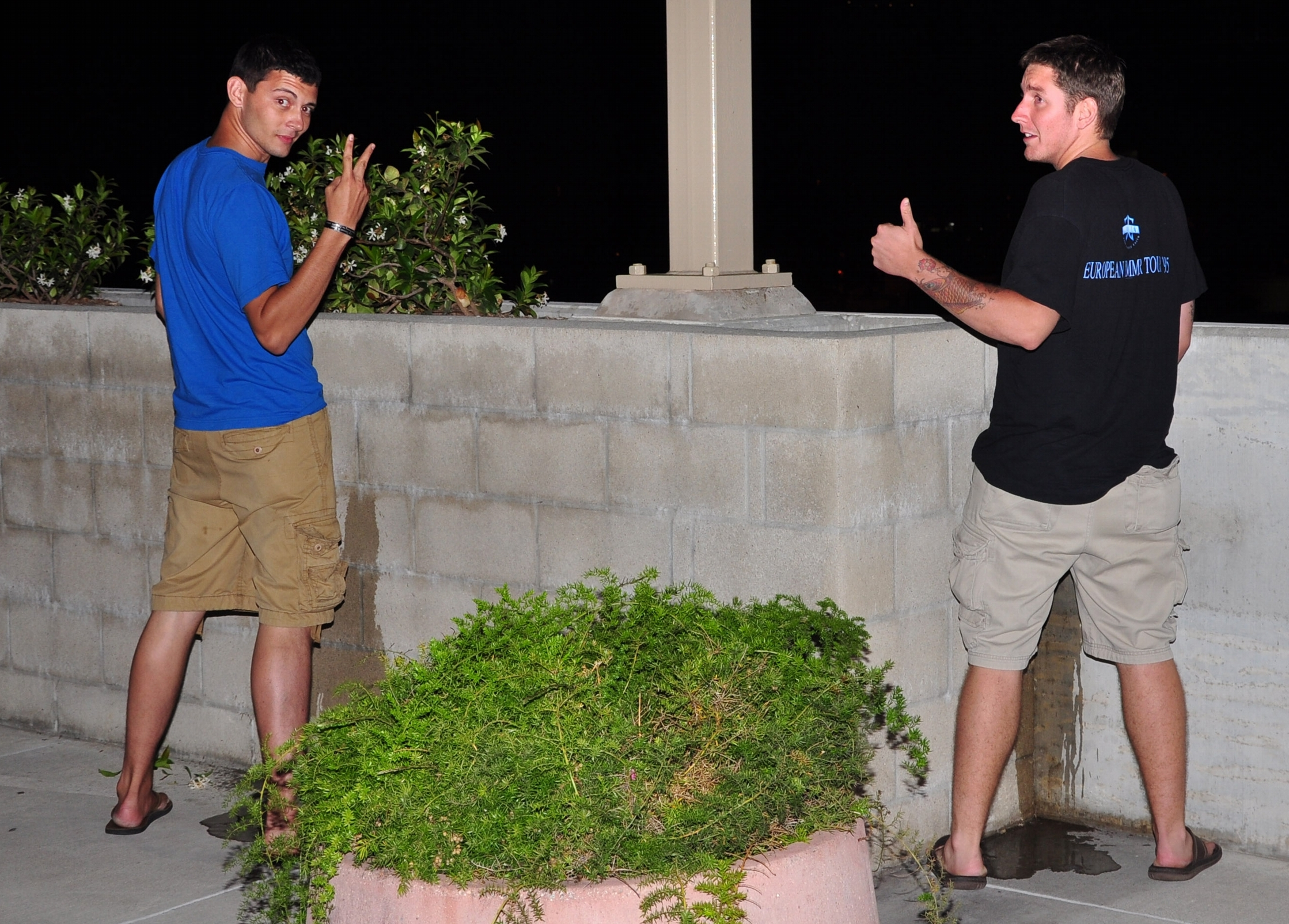
Two men urinating in public, which is often perceived to be indecent exposure

Indecent exposure is the deliberate public exposure by a person of a portion of their body in a manner contrary to local standards of appropriate behavior. Laws and social attitudes regarding indecent exposure vary significantly in different countries. It ranges from outright prohibition of the exposure of any body parts other than the hands or face to prohibition of exposure of certain body parts, such as the genital area, buttocks or breasts.

Decency is generally judged by the standards of the local community, which are seldom codified in specifics in law. Such standards may be based on religion, morality or tradition, or justified on the basis of "necessary to public order". Non-sexual exhibitionism or public nudity is sometimes considered indecent exposure. If sexual acts are performed, with or without an element of nudity, this can be considered gross indecency in some jurisdictions, which is usually a more serious criminal offence. (Note: Historically, gross indecency statutes often did not specifically define the crime itself, leaving this up to the determination of courts. In practice, gross indecency was used primarily to criminalize sexual activity between men that fell short of sodomy laws, though present-day statutes vary.) In some countries, exposure of the body in breach of community standards of modesty is also considered to be public indecency.

The legal and community standards of what states of undress constitute indecent exposure vary considerably and depend on the context in which the exposure takes place. These standards have also varied over time, making the definition of indecent exposure a complex topic.

== History ==
What is an inappropriate state of dress in a particular context depends on the standards of decency of the community where an exposure takes place. These standards have varied throughout history and can vary from the very strict standards of modesty in places such as Afghanistan and Saudi Arabia, which require most of the body to be covered, to tribal societies such as the Pirahã or Mursi where full nakedness is the norm. There is generally no implication that the state of dress objected to is of a sexual nature; and if such an allegation were to be made, the act would generally be described as "gross indecency".

The standards of decency have varied over time. During the Victorian era, for example, exposure of a woman's legs, and to some extent the arms, was considered indecent in much of the Western world. Hair was sometimes required to be covered in formal occasions as in the form of a hat or bonnet. As late as the 1930s – and to some extent, the 1950s – both women and men were expected to bathe or swim in public places wearing bathing suits that covered above the waist. An adult woman exposing her navel was also considered indecent in parts of the West into the 1960s and 1970s, and even as late as the 1980s. Moral values changed drastically during the 1990s and 2000s, which in turn changed the criteria for indecent exposure. Public exposure of the navel has been accepted during the 1990s, while in the 2000s, exposure of the buttocks while wearing a thong at a beach became acceptable. Female toplessness, however, still remains a debated topic, with female toplessness proponents arguing that laws against toplessness that apply to females specifically represent a gender inequality and that the breasts shouldn't be inherently sexualized. Anti-toplessness arguments commonly center around contemporary societal standards, contending that males and females differ in what should be considered nudity, and that anti-nudity laws "merely [reflect] current community standards as to what constitutes nudity." Female toplessness legislation continues to differ widely across the various countries of the world.

== Breastfeeding ==
Breastfeeding in public does not constitute indecent exposure under the laws of the United States, Canada, Australia, or Great Britain. In the United States, the federal government and all 50 states have enacted laws specifically protecting nursing mothers from harassment by others. Legislation ranges from simply exempting breastfeeding from laws regarding indecent exposure, to outright full protection of the right to nurse.

In some jurisdictions, such as Northern Ireland, other laws not specific to breastfeeding are used to protect those who breastfeed.

== Public clothing ==
Public clothing varies by country and may be regulated by law. What parts of the body must be covered varies by region. Although genitals are usually expected to be covered in public in almost all societies, when it comes to other parts of the body such as female breasts, midriff, legs or shoulders, norms vary. For example, in some African cultures, it is the thighs, not the breasts, that must be covered. In some societies, the head hair, especially female, must be covered, usually with a scarf. The vast majority of cultures accept that the face can and must be seen, but some cultures (especially in the Middle East) require that a woman's face be covered under a burqa. In conservative societies, appearing in a public place in clothing that is deemed 'indecent' is illegal. In many countries there are exceptions to the general rules (social or legal) regarding clothing. For instance, a country that generally prohibits full nudity may allow it in designated places, such as nude beaches, or during various social events such as festivals or nude protests.

In some cultural contexts, clothing conventions differ not only by gender but also by societal perception of modesty and exposure. For instance, boys wearing skirts—although not traditional in many regions—have been increasingly accepted as part of modern, gender-fluid fashion trends. However, incidents of indecent exposure involving boys in skirts have sometimes elicited different public reactions compared to similar incidents involving women.

== Outraging public decency ==
Outraging public decency is a common law offence in England and Wales. It is a broader offence than indecent exposure, but can only be committed in a public place where at least two people are present, who need not actually witness it.

== Africa ==
=== Namibia ===
Namibian authorities announced that foreign tourists who were nude while visiting the Namib-Naukluft National Park would be banned from all national parks.

== Asia ==
=== Saudi Arabia ===
Women in Saudi Arabia were required to wear robes and a headscarf when in public, although Crown Prince Mohammed bin Salman has said that it is not required. In September 2019, Saudi Arabia issued the public decency law identifying the rules related to the public decency that citizens and tourists should follow in compliance with Saudi law.

== Europe ==
Attitudes towards nudity vary by country and are generally most relaxed in Scandinavia, where genitals and breasts are not normally considered indecent or obscene. Hence, laws and societal views on public nudity are generally relaxed. In Finland, it is very typical for patrons to bathe nude in the intense heat of saunas.

In the Netherlands, public nudity is allowed at sites that have been assigned by the local authorities and "other suitable places". On nudist beaches, in unisex saunas and in swimming pool changing rooms, remaining partially clothed is frowned upon and the social norm is to undress.

In Barcelona, public nudity was a recognised right. However, on 30 April 2011, the Barcelona City Council voted a by-law forbidding walking "naked or nearly naked in public spaces" and limiting the wearing of bathing costumes to pools, beaches, adjacent streets and sea-side walks.

Other countries, such as the UK, Ireland or Poland, are more conservative.

=== United Kingdom ===
The law concerning public nudity varies among the countries of the United Kingdom. In England and Wales, public nudity is not generally illegal, unless intended to cause alarm or distress members of the public. In some places, such as Henley-on-Thames, local by-laws criminalise naked bathing in the river or sea, with a fine which has remained unchanged since the nineteenth century and is now trivial. Such bylaws are actually rendered unenforceable as they cannot override national legislation. Concerns that the police do not take "Exposure" sufficiently seriously are matched by other opinions that public nudity is natural and proper. The College of Policing and the Crown Prosecution Service have issued very clear guidance that simple passive naturism will not amount to any offence and do not require a police attendance. Cases occasionally come before magistrates' courts, with varying outcomes.

==== England and Wales ====
During the 19th and 20th centuries, indecent exposure was prosecuted under section 28 of the Town Police Clauses Act 1847 or section 4 of the Vagrancy Act 1824. The latter contained a provision for the prosecution of:

every person wilfully openly, lewdly, and obscenely exposing his person in any street, road, or public highway, or in the view thereof, or in any place of public resort, with intent to insult any female ...

This provision, and the nudity provision of the 1824 Vagrancy Act, were repealed by Schedule 7, s.140 of the Sexual Offences Act 2003. They were replaced by an offence that is both gender neutral, and more specific and explicit, 66 Exposure. It is defined as

A person commits an offence if—

1. he intentionally exposes his genitals, and
2. he intends that someone will see them and be caused alarm or distress.

The maximum penalty is two years' imprisonment, very rare as most cases are dealt with by a fine or through community service. If sentenced to a term of imprisonment or a community order in excess of 12 months – or if the person they exposed themselves to was aged under 18 years old – they must appear on and sign the Violent and Sex Offender Register.

In the past public nudity in England and Wales could also be punished as "disorderly behaviour" under the Public Order Act 1986, sections 4A and 5. However, the law was clarified in the spring of 2018 and those sections are no longer considered to apply to simple public nudity. Guidance from the Crown Prosecution Service and the College of Policing does not recommend prosecution for public nudity if there is no implied intent to cause alarm (or distress). Intention can be inferred by circumstantial evidence; see Intention in English law.

Occasional "streaking" by naked exhibitionists running across public sports fields is often enthusiastically applauded by the spectators, so negating any intention to cause alarm or distress. A common defence on arrest for indecent exposure is the innocent intent to urinate, but that may be prosecuted as a public nuisance. (At Holborn Viaduct in London an old painted notice warns "Commit No Nuisance").

==== Scotland ====
Under Scots law, "indecent conduct" in a public place, such as exposing the genitals or engaging in sexual activity, can constitute the common law offence of public indecency. Stephen Gough, a man known as the "Naked Rambler" who hiked across Britain wearing only shoes, was arrested numerous times in Scotland. He was convicted of the common law offence of breach of the peace and spent time in prison for contempt of court for refusing to wear clothes whilst in court.

==== Northern Ireland ====
The Sexual Offences (Northern Ireland) Order 2008 brought the legislation regarding indecent exposure in Northern Ireland into line with that in England and Wales.

=== Germany ===
In Germany and Switzerland there is a culture of Freikörperkultur which means that there are many public spaces where people are welcome to be naked.

== North America ==
=== Canada ===
In Canada, s.173 of the Criminal Code prohibits "indecent acts". There is no statutory definition in the Code of what constitutes an indecent act, other than the exposure of the genitals and/or female nipples for a sexual purpose to anyone under 16 years of age. Thus, the decision of what states of undress are "indecent", and thereby unlawful, is left to judges. Judges have held, for example, that nude sunbathing is not indecent. Also, streaking is similarly not regarded as indecent. Section 174 prohibits nudity if it offends "against public decency or order" and in view of the public. The courts have found that nude swimming is not offensive under this definition.

Toplessness is also not an indecent act under s.173. In 1991, Gwen Jacob was arrested for walking in a street in Guelph, Ontario, while topless. She was acquitted in 1996 by the Ontario Court of Appeal on the basis that the act of being topless is not in itself a sexual act or indecent. The case has been referred to in subsequent cases for the proposition that the mere act of public nudity is not sexual or indecent or an offense. Since then, it is legal for a female to walk topless in public anywhere in Ontario, Canada.

=== United States ===
The laws governing indecent exposure in the United States vary according to location. In most states, public nudity is illegal. However, in some states, it is only illegal if it is accompanied by an intent to shock, arouse, or offend other persons. Some states permit local governments to set local standards. Most states exempt breastfeeding mothers from prosecution.

The phenomenon widely known as flashing, involving a woman exposing bare nipples by suddenly pulling up her shirt and bra, is public exposure and is therefore defined by statute in many states of the United States as prohibited criminal behavior.

== Oceania ==
=== Australia ===
In Australia, it is a summary or criminal offence in some States and Territories to expose one's genitals (also referred to as "his or her person") in a public place or in view of a public place. In some jurisdictions, exposure of the genitals alone does not constitute an offence unless accompanied by an indecent act, indecent behaviour, grossly indecent behaviour, obscenity, intention to cause offence, or deliberate intention. The applicable law is different in each jurisdiction and in several jurisdictions the offence of indecent exposure does not apply.

Penalties vary between jurisdictions and are summarised below. Specific state Acts, are as follows:

- Australian Capital Territory – Crimes Act 1900, section 393 – 'indecent exposure' – penalty 12 months. Under the Nudity Act 1976, the responsible minister may declare a public area where public nudity is permitted.
- New South Wales – Summary Offences Act 1988, section 5 – 'wilful and obscene exposure' – penalty six months.
- Northern Territory – Summary Offences Act, section 50 – 'indecent exposure' – penalty 6 months.
- South Australia – Summary Offences Act 1953, section 23 – 'Indecent behaviour and gross indecency' – penalty three months and six months respectively.
- Queensland – Summary Offences Act 2005 No. 4, section 9 – 'wilful exposure' – penalty 12 months.
- Tasmania – Police Offences Act 1935, section 21 – 'Prohibited behaviour' – penalty 12 months. Police Offences Act 1935, section 14 – 'Public decency' – one penalty unit.
- Victoria – Summary Offences Act 1966, section 19 – 'wilful and obscene exposure' – penalty two years. Under the Nudity (Prescribed Areas) Act 1983 the responsible minister may declare a public area where public nudity is permitted.
- Western Australia – Criminal Code, section 203 – 'Indecent acts in public' – criminal penalty two years. Summary conviction penalty: 9 months and fine of $9,000.

==== Definition of person ====
The laws of New South Wales, the Australian Capital Territory and the Northern Territory use the term "person", while in the other States the exposure refers to the genital area. It has been noted that a term such as "exposing one's person" relates back to the United Kingdom Vagrancy Act 1824 and Evans v Ewels (1972) where it was said that the word "person" was a genteel synonym for "penis" or "vulva". However, it has been suggested that the word "person" in s5 of the (NSW) Summary Offences Act is not limited to "penis" or "vulva". For example, in R v Eyles (1997) the offender was seen masturbating in his front garden and charged with obscene exposure under the NSW Act. The judge noted, obiter dicta, that

In the case of both males and females, the parts of the body which are capable of being employed for the purpose of obscene exposure are limited. The concepts of obscenity and exposure in a practical sense restrict the potential operation of the provision. There is a question as to whether there is any further restriction to be found in the word "person". The Crown Advocate has submitted that there may be circumstances in which the exposure of the breasts of a woman is capable of being regarded as obscene, and that it is not difficult to imagine circumstances in which the exposure of a person's buttocks could be obscene.

=== Fiji ===
Public nudity is illegal in Fiji.

=== New Zealand ===
In New Zealand, indecent exposure is considered to be where a person "intentionally and obscenely exposes any part of his or her genitals". Otherwise there is no specific law prohibiting nudity in public places, although lesser charges may apply depending on the behaviour of the individual in question.

The High Court of New Zealand has upheld a conviction of disorderly conduct for nudity in the street, because it was not a place where nudity was known to occur or commonplace. Being nude in the street is likely to incur a small fine if a complaint is made against the person, or if the person ignores a police request to cover themselves. Being prosecuted for nudity on a public beach, or any place where nudity might be expected, is very unlikely.

== See also ==
- Anasyrma – Culturally framed gesture of lifting the skirt or kilt
- Clothing laws by country
- Erotic humiliation – Consensual use of humiliation in a sexual context
- Exhibitionism – Public exposure of intimate body parts
- Islam and clothing – Customs of clothing associated with Islam
  - Hijab – Islamic head covering for women
- Obscenity – Act or statement that offends the morality of the period
- Public display of affection – Acts of physical intimacy in the view of others
- Public sex – Sexual activity that takes place in a public context
- Public urination – Act of urinating in a public space
- Open defecation – Humans defecating outside rather than into a toilet
- Naturism – Practice and advocacy of social nudity
- Sexual revolution – 20th-century Western social movement
- Strip games – Game involving clothing removal
- Underwear as outerwear – Fashion trend
- Vulgarity – Quality of being common, coarse, or unrefined
- Wardrobe malfunction – Accidental exposure of nudity in public
- Whale tail – Rear portion of a thong or G-string
