= Fixer (person) =

Person who solves problems for others

A fixer is someone who is assigned or contracted to solve problems for others. The meaning of the term varies by context. In British or Commonwealth countries it refers to a person such as a special adviser who "gets things done". In American English it implies that the methods used are of questionable morality or legality: in organized crime, fixers (or "cleaners") dispose of incriminating physical evidence such as bodies or witnesses; in sports a fixer is someone who pre-arranges the outcome of a contest; in journalism a fixer is a local person who expedites the work of a (foreign) correspondent. The term may also refer to an unscrupulous or criminally-acting attorney.

== Facilitator ==
Fixers may primarily use legal means, such as lawsuits and payoffs, to accomplish their ends, or they may carry out unlawful activities. The White House Plumbers have been described as fixers for Richard Nixon; their methods included break-ins and burglary. Fixers who specialize in disposing of evidence or bodies are called "cleaners", like the character of Victor "The Cleaner" in the film La Femme Nikita, or the fictional Jonathan Quinn, subject of the Brett Battles novel The Cleaner.

In Britain, a fixer is a commercial consultant for business improvement, whereas in an American context a fixer is often an associate of a powerful person who carries out difficult, undercover, or stealth actions, or extricates a client out of personal or legal trouble. A fixer may freelance, like Judy Smith, a well-known American public relations "crisis consultant" whose career provided inspiration for the popular 2012 television series Scandal. More commonly a fixer works for a single employer, under a title such as "attorney" or "bodyguard", which does not typically describe the kinds of services that they provide.

In Filipino English, fixer has a deeply negative meaning where it refers to individuals who help give government clients preferential priority or speedy processing in an agency for a price. Some also practise illegal activities such as swindling and selling fake IDs unbeknownst to the client. Because of their work, fixers have connections with government employees in the office they loiter around and give cuts to their partners inside. Fixers are typically found outside buildings of government agencies, particularly around many Land Transportation Office field branches. Due to bribery and scamming, fixers are illegal under Philippine law and those caught are imprisoned for 6 years and fined up to 200,000 pesos.

== Sports match fixer ==
In sport, when a match fixer arranges a preordained outcome of a sporting or athletic contest, the motivation is often gambling, and the fixer is often employed by organized crime. In the Black Sox Scandal, for instance, Major League Baseball players became involved with a gambling syndicate and agreed to lose the 1919 World Series in exchange for payoffs. In another example, in 1975, Boston mobster Anthony "Fat Tony" Ciulla of the Winter Hill Gang was identified as the fixer who routinely bribed jockeys to throw horse races. Other insiders may also be fixers, as in the case of veterinarian Mark Gerard, who, in September 1978, was convicted of fraud for "masterminding a horse-racing scandal that involved switching two thoroughbreds" so that he could cash in on a long-shot bet.

== Journalism ==
In journalism, a fixer is someone, often a local journalist, hired by a correspondent or a media company to help arrange a story. Fixers will often act as translators and guides, and help to arrange local interviews that the correspondent would otherwise not be able to access. They help collect information for the story and sometimes play a crucial role in the outcome. Fixers are rarely credited, and often put themselves in danger, especially in regimes where they might face consequences from an oppressive government for exposing iniquities the state may want to censor.

These aides are often the prime risk mitigators within a journalist's team, making crucial decisions for the reporter. According to journalist Laurie Few, "You don't have time not to listen (to the fixer)", and anybody who disregards a fixer's advice "is going to step on a landmine, figurative or actual". Fixers have ranged from civilians to local journalists within regions of conflict. They are rarely credited and paid menially, which has begun a conversation for the compensation rights of these individuals. According to statistics gathered from the Global Investigative Journalism Network, the base pay for a fixer's time ranged from US$50–400 per day.

A map based on publicly accessible research data shows a visual representation of data collected from various studies conducted on both fixers and their journalist counterparts from over 70 countries. Gathered from the Global Reporting Centre, the survey demographic map had 132 respondents from North America, 101 from Europe, 23 from South America, Africa and Eurasia, 63 from Asia and 9 from Australia.

== In popular culture ==
Numerous films and several songs have been named The Fixer. As a genre, they illustrate the different meanings of the term. Most commonly, they refer to the kind of person who carries out illicit activities on behalf of someone else. For example, the 2008 British television series The Fixer is about "a renegade group acting outside the law to bring order to the spiraling criminal activity in the country".

- The 1986 film Wise Guys features Captain Lou Albano as Frankie "The Fixer" Acavano, an overweight, violent yet gluttonous psychopath who is tasked with tracking and killing the protagonists after ripping off their boss, Lou Castello, of a quarter of a million dollars in a fixed horse race.
- The 1990 film La Femme Nikita features Jean Reno as a cleaner who is called in to kill everyone and destroy the bodies after a mission goes awry.
- The 1994 film Pulp Fiction features Harvey Keitel as Winston Wolf, a notorious fixer and cleaner, who helps the protagonists dispose of a corpse.
- The main antagonist of the 2000 novel Void Moon is a near-psychotic fixer who cleans and investigates a murder in his employer's casino.
- A BBC Two documentary Alex Polizzi: The Fixer features a fixer in the benign British sense – a consultant who helps to turn around failing businesses.
- The 2000 bro-Western thriller The Way of the Gun has James Caan as a fixer known as Joe Sarno, a "Bagman".
- The 2007 film Michael Clayton stars George Clooney as a fixer who works for a prestigious law firm and uses his connections and knowledge of legal loopholes to help his clients.
- In the ABC drama Scandal, the main character Olivia Pope (portrayed by Kerry Washington) was a fixer and head of Pope and Associates, a crisis management organization that fixed political scandals and cleaned up crimes. Kerry Washington's character, Olivia Pope, is partially based on former George H. W. Bush administration press aide Judy Smith, who serves as a co-executive producer.
- In the FX series Sons of Anarchy, author Stephen King portrays a cleaner by the name of "Bachman", a nod to King's pen name Richard Bachman, who is hired by Gemma Teller Morrow to dispose of her father's caretaker's body after her accidental death.
- The Netflix series House of Cards featured Michael Kelly as Doug Stamper, a fixer for politician Frank Underwood.
- In the AMC TV series Breaking Bad, the character Mike Ehrmantraut played by Jonathan Banks was the cleaner for Gustavo Fring's operations, later reprising the role in the series' prequel spinoff, Better Call Saul.
- The TV series Suits features Harvey Specter (played by Gabriel Macht) as a New York firm's top lawyer for fixing clients' problems. It also features Steven Huntley as the fixer for Edward Darby in Season 3. Many other fixers are also prevalent across its nine seasons.
- The TV series Ray Donovan follows the eponymous character, played by Liev Schreiber, a LA-based fixer for celebrities. The character was inspired by a variety of Hollywood fixers such as Eddie Mannix and Fred Otash.
- The 2016 Coen brothers' film Hail, Caesar!, satirizes the American film industry of the 1950s, and is very loosely inspired by Eddie Mannix's career as a Hollywood studio executive and fixer. In the film, actor Josh Brolin portrayed Mannix, who is shown scrambling to quietly resolve the kidnapping of an A-list leading man, while battling to keep multiple thinly fictionalized send-ups of real Hollywood scandals of the era out of the tabloids. Behind it all, however, Mannix is depicted as a devout, if not sinful and unconventional, Roman Catholic family man with two children and a doting homemaker wife named Connie Mannix (Alison Pill).
- The 2016 Romanian drama The Fixer and the 2009 documentary Fixer: The Taking of Ajmal Naqshbandi are each about journalistic fixers.
- The 2024 movie Wolfs is inspired from real life Hollywood fixer Paul Barresi. The film stars George Clooney, Brad Pitt, Amy Ryan, Austin Abrams, and Poorna Jagannathan.
- The 2025 British crime drama MobLand features Harry Da Souza, played by Tom Hardy, as the street-smart and formidable fixer for the London-based Harrigan crime family. The series stars Pierce Brosnan and Helen Mirren as Conrad and Maeve Harrigan, respectively. MobLand is loosely based on the Showtime series Ray Donovan.

== Notable fixers ==
=== Business ===
- Alex Polizzi

=== Entertainment ===
- Eddie Mannix
- Fred Otash
- Anthony Pellicano
- Howard Strickling

=== Journalism ===
- Acquitté Kisembe – Agence France-Presse in the Democratic Republic of Congo (missing since 2003)
- Almigdad Mojalli – Independent freelance fixer/journalist in Yemen (killed in action, 2016)
- Bakhtiyar Haddad – Iraqi fixer for French reporter Stephan Villeneuve (Both killed in action in Mosul, 2014)
- Zabihullah Tamanna – Translator for US National Public Radio in Afghanistan (killed in action, 2016)
- Ajmal Naqshbandi – Journalist/Fixer in Afghanistan. Killed by Taliban. (Killed in action, 2011)
- Sayed Agha – Driver/fixer in Afghanistan. Killed by Taliban. (Killed in action, 2011)

=== Organized crime ===
- Magaly Chaves "La Faraona" Ante (Sinaloa Cartel)
- Gabriel Zendejas Chavez (Mexican Mafia)
- Manoel Alves "Sasquati" da Silva (Primeiro Comando da Capital)
- Sidney Rogério "Lacraia" de Moraes (Primeiro Comando da Capital)
- Sidney Korshak (Chicago Outfit)
- Arnold Rothstein (Jewish Mafia)
- Yoshio Kodama (Yakuza)
- Hisayuki Machii (Yakuza – Tosei-kai)
- Željko Raznatović Arkan (Serbian mafia)
- Milorad Ulemek (Serbian mafia – Zemun clan)
- John Francis "Johnny Cash" Morrissey (Irish Mafia – Kinahan crime family)
- Dámaso López "El Licenciado" Núñez (Sinaloa Cartel)
- Miguel "Z-40" Treviño Morales (Los Zetas Cartel)

=== Politics ===
- Bader Alomair
- Lucius Cornelius Balbus
- Michael Cohen (lawyer)
- Roy Cohn
- David Hart
- Konstantin Kilimnik
- Michael Pocalyko
- Keith Schiller

=== Public relations ===
- Mike Sitrick
- Judy Smith

=== Religion ===
- Mike Rinder (Scientology Church)

== See also ==
- Cleaner role in arts and entertainment
- Henchman
- Contract killing
