= Bader Alomair =

Saudi attorney

Bader Alomair is a Saudi Arabian attorney and fixer employed by the Saudi embassy in Washington, D.C. He is known for his participation in the extradition of Saudi citizens from the United States.

== Background ==
In 2017, Alomair was quoted in Arab News as an embassy spokesman in response to an assault on a Saudi student in the United States.

A 2021 investigation by The Washington Post described Alomair as the "working-level point man" for Saudis with legal issues in the United States. Alomair, who was reportedly "not a senior official" but a "mid-level bureaucrat who answers to higher authorities," coordinated legal representation for Saudi citizens but, beyond the legally accepted boundaries of consular assistance, also helped Saudi citizens engage in bail jumping and arranged transport for Saudi fugitives from justice.

In March 2023, Alomair was identified by multiple news outlets as the Saudi attorney who had taken custody of Eden Knight, a transgender woman who was lured back to Saudi Arabia by her family and subsequently died by suicide. Alomair, who had been hired by Eden's parents alongside the American private investigator Michael Pocalyko, falsely told Eden that she needed to return to Saudi Arabia in order to apply for asylum in the United States, and per Eden's suicide note coerced her into detransitioning.

A 2025 investigation by the BBC World Service noted that Alomair was Harvard-educated, registered with the District of Columbia Bar, drove a vehicle with Saudi diplomatic license plates, owned real estate in the DC area, and as of August 2024 was the named partner in a Virginia law firm.
