= Harry Brand =

American press agent (1895–1989)

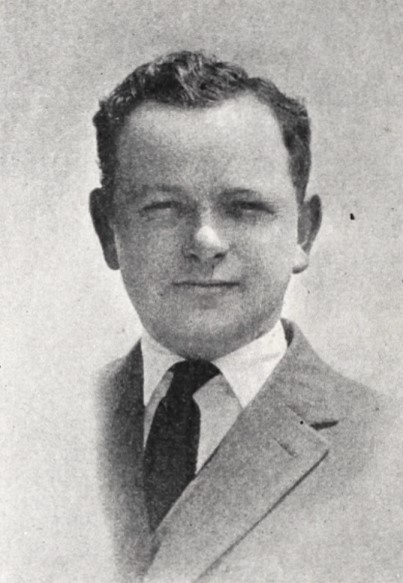
- From a 1925 magazine
- Born: Harry Robert Brand; October 20, 1895; New York, New York, US
- Died: February 22, 1989 (aged 93); Beverly Hills, California, US
- Occupation: Press agent
- Years active: 1925–1984
- Employer: 20th Century Fox
- Spouse: Sybil Brand (married 1933)

Harry Brand (October 20, 1895 – February 22, 1989) was an American press agent. Described as "the mastermind who made Shirley Temple the most famous child star in history, Betty Grable a GI Joe pinup girl and Marilyn Monroe a sex goddess," Brand was the head of publicity at 20th Century Fox from 1935 until 1962.

Known as the "Herald of Hyperbole" for his exuberant press releases, Brand was an accomplished fixer. Married to Sybil Brand, a prominent philanthropist and political fundraiser, and the brother of a Los Angeles Superior Court Judge, he utilized his family connections as well as his relationships with powerful columnists such as Louella Parsons and Walter Winchell to keep scandals and indiscretions that involved his clients out of the headlines.

== Early life and education ==
Brand was born in New York to Austrian immigrants Louis Brand, a tailor, and Celia Berry Brand. He moved with his family to Los Angeles in 1900, and in 1902 broke his leg. Set improperly, he walked with a limp and was in pain for the rest of his life.

Brand went to Los Angeles High School, where he edited the school paper and served as the treasurer for the debate team. He briefly attended the University of Southern California.

== Career ==
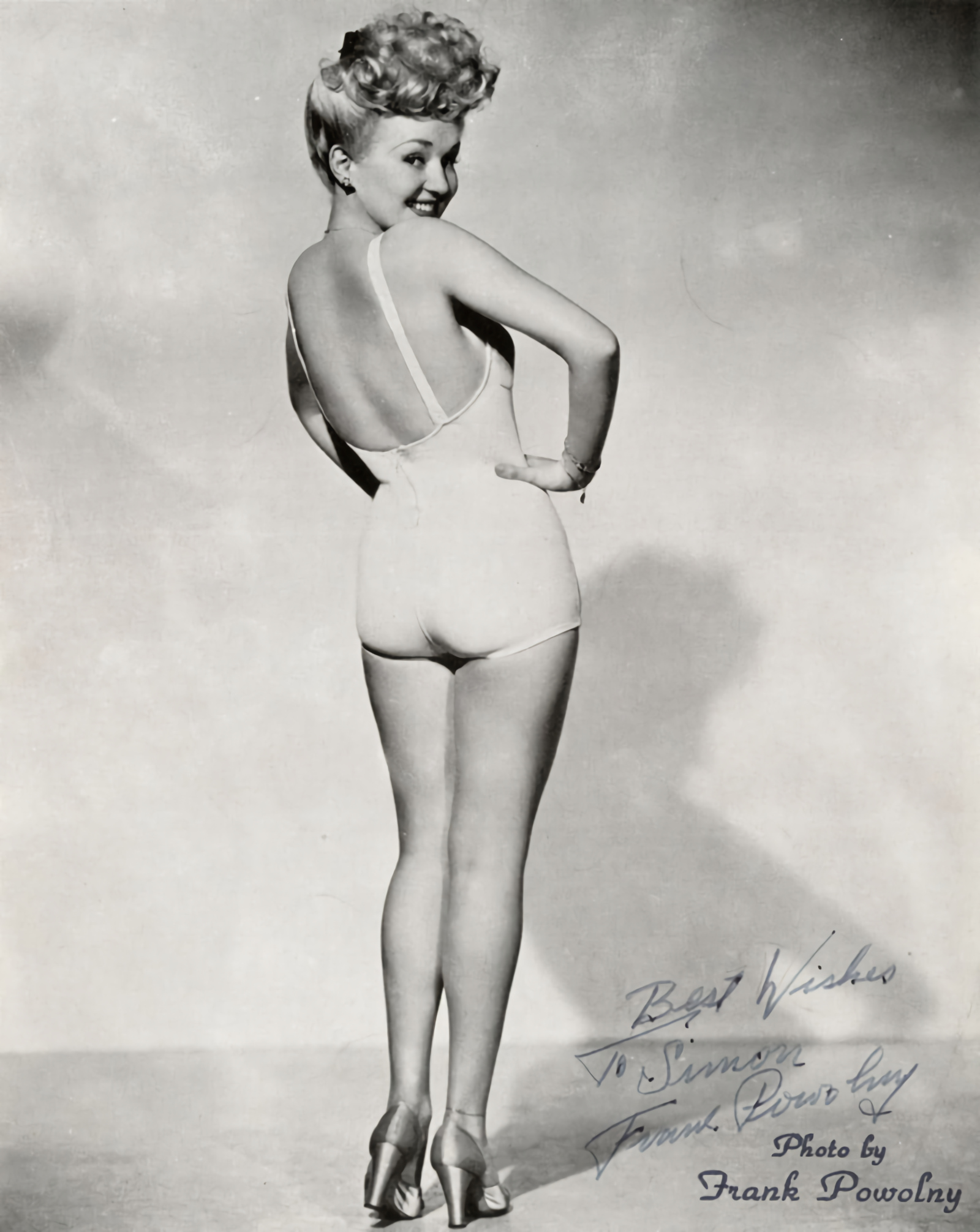
Pin-up of Betty Grable

Brand began his career as a sports writer and editor at the Los Angeles Express. Interested in politics, he left the paper to become the secretary to Los Angeles Mayor Arthur "Pinky" Snyder, where he saw to it that the sometimes drunk mayor did not make an "official fool of himself" and had "all the reporters and correspondants keep his greatness in the public eye." Brand was then hired by Warner Bros. Pictures, where he served as the press agent for Fatty Arbuckle and Buster Keaton, among others. (Keaton "had a curious relationship with Brand" and considered him a nemesis; he described Brand as a failed newspaper man "who was addicted to showing (his) boss clippings that appeared in metropolitan newspapers with (a) circulation of 150.")

Brand was president of the Western Association of Motion Picture Advertisers, which selected WAMPAS Baby Stars each year, in 1925. He worked on several films with producer Joseph M. Schenck, and in 1935, when Schenk founded 20th Century Pictures with Darryl F. Zanuck, he hired Brand as the studio's publicity head. He played an essential role in the career of the famously abrasive Zanuck; he advised him on "all problems related to his personal contact" with the public and often played 'good cop' to Zanuck's 'bad cop' to resolve disputes with 20th Century Fox stars.

As was common at the time, Brand invented backstories and added fictional embellishments in his efforts to promote actors and films. For example, to enhance Tyrone Power's masculinity, Brand said that the 5'8" actor was six feet tall, and linked him romantically with actresses Loretta Young, Janet Gaynor, and Sonja Henie. To promote Peter Lorre as Mr. Moto, a Japanese secret agent, a press release stated that Lorre was a "stickler for realism" and, as such, had immersed himself in Japanese culture. According to Brand, Lorre had interviewed Japanese laborers in the field, read Japanese fiction and poetry, and studied Buddhism and Shintoism to prepare for the role. It was a practice which was looked upon with affection rather than derision; columnists wrote anecdotes about Brand's tactics, and the Los Angeles Times praised him as "tirelessly inventive."

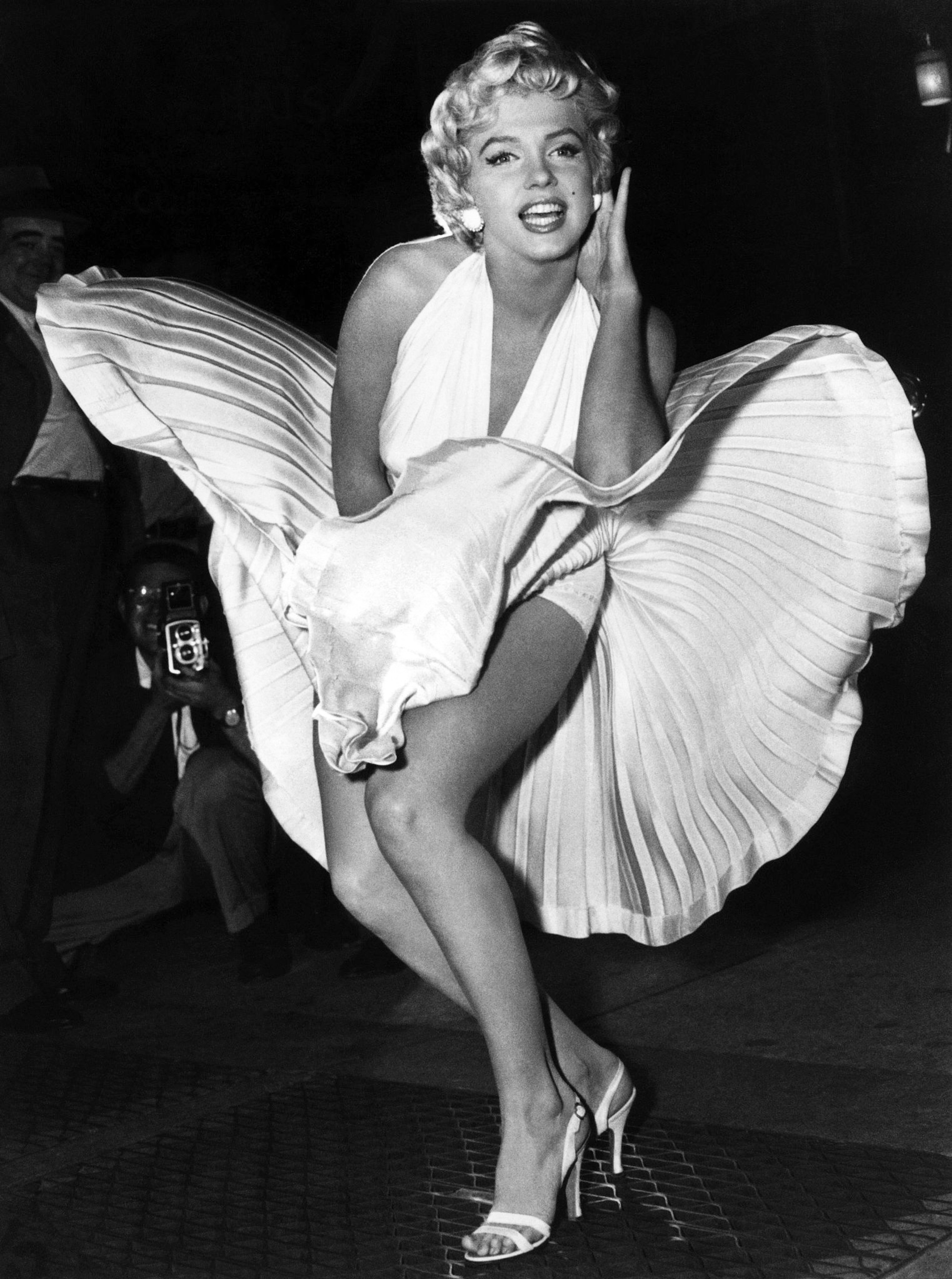
Marilyn Monroe

Brand has been described as a "master of the game" of publicity stunts. He had Fox insure actress Betty Grable's legs for $1,000,000. The massive press coverage related to 'Betty Grable's million-dollar legs' helped Grable to become the top female star of the 1940s. The 1943 publicity still of Grable in a swimsuit was the #1 pin-up for American GIs during World War II; it was later included in Life Magazine's list of 100 Photographs that Changed the World.

In 1949, when it became known that Marilyn Monroe had done a nude shoot for a calendar, Brand said that she would "look good in a potato sack" and provided photos of her posing suggestively in one.

Brand was the first to know about Marilyn Monroe's 1954 wedding to Joe DiMaggio.

In 1955, he created a frenzy on the streets of New York City when he invited photographers to shoot Monroe as her skirt was raised by the wind of the subway during the filming of The Seven Year Itch. (The pandemonium which ensued required that the actual scene used in the film be reshot in the studio.)

Brand formally retired as the head of publicity for Fox in 1962. Given an office on the studio lot, he continued to work for Fox as a consultant until his health failed in 1982.

== Personal life ==
Brand and Sybil Morris were married in 1933. She was a successful activist for the rights of women in American jails; the Sybil Brand Institute was named after her. Sybil died at the age of 104 in 2004. Brand's stepson, George, was a composer who worked on films including The Godfather Part II and Dune.

Brand was diagnosed with chronic obstructive pulmonary disease in 1959, and died of a heart attack following a bout of pneumonia in 1989. At his request, there was no funeral or memorial service.

== See also ==
- Eddie Mannix
- Howard Strickling
