= LGBTQ rights in Saudi Arabia =

- Saudi Arabia
- Legal status: Illegal
- Penalty: Capital punishment, prison terms (indeterminate length), flogging, fines, deportation
- Gender identity: No
- Military: No
- Discrimination protections: No protections

Family rights
- Recognition of relationships: No recognition of same-sex relationships
- Adoption: No

Lesbian, gay, bisexual, transgender and queer (LGBTQ) people in Saudi Arabia face repression and discrimination. Both male and female same-sex behavior is punishable by death within the country. Therefore, there are no protections for LGBTQ people in Saudi Arabia.

The law of Saudi Arabia is uncodified; a Wahhabist interpretation of sharia, derived from the Quran and the Sunnah, is the basis of the law and justice system. In particular, the Quranic account of the prophet Lut and certain teachings of Muhammad in the Sunnah, inform the legal treatment of same-sex sexual activity and nonconforming-gender presentation. Homosexuality and transgender status or gender non-conformity are widely seen as immoral and indecent, and the law allows penalties for acts of homosexuality of capital punishment, prison sentences of indeterminate length (Note: The length of any prison sentence imposed is discretionary, not codified, nor dependent on precedent. Maximum terms of imprisonment are not ascertainable, but life terms may be possible.) (the maximum term is unknown), fines, flogging, and deportation for foreigners. During investigations and detentions, mistreatment of suspects and detainees, including beatings and torture, have occurred. Community violence against LGBTQ persons occurs.

In May 2023, the Saudi Tourism Authority website updated its FAQ page stating that all visitors, including LGBTQ visitors, were welcome to visit the country. Though homosexuality remains illegal, enforcement of the laws is not universal. The move follows a series of social and economic changes, including the abandonment of the enforcement of wearing the hijab in public, and the opening of the first public beach in Saudi Arabia where women can wear bikinis. The decision to host the 2034 FIFA World Cup within Saudi Arabia received strong criticism from the LGBTQ community.

== Legality ==
=== Criminal laws ===
Saudi Arabia has no criminal code. The primary source of law in Saudi Arabia is the Sharia (Islamic law), which is derived from the Quran. Specifically, prohibition of same-sex sexual acts is based on the Quranic story of the prophet Lut and traditions of the teachings of Muhammad contained in the Sunnah. Ijma, or scholarly consensus on the meaning of the Quran and the Sunnah, developed after Muhammad's death. Qiyas, or analogical reasoning applied to the principles of the Quran, Sunnah and ijma is used: Judges apply their personal interpretation of sharia to any particular case (ijtihad) and are not bound by any previous decisions, sometimes resulting in divergent judgements even in apparently identical cases. In addition, royal decrees and government regulations have been issued. Reformers have often called for codified laws to be instituted, and there appears to be a trend in the country to codify, publish and even translate some Saudi criminal and civil laws. However, the traditional interpretation of Sharia is that it prohibits homosexual acts (as zina or unlawful sexual intercourse) and, specifically, liwat or sodomy, though there is a difference of opinion on the punishment ranging from none at all (Hanafi) to the death penalty.

In 1928, the Saudi judicial board advised Islamic judges to look for guidance in two books by the Hanbalite jurist Marʿī ibn Yūsuf al-Karmī al-Maqdisī (died 1033/1624). Liwat (sodomy) is to be:

...treated like fornication, and must be punished in the same manner. If muḥṣan [commonly translated as "adulterer" but technically meaning someone who has had legal intercourse, but who may or may not currently be married] and free [not a slave], one must be stoned to death, while a free bachelor must be punished with 100 lashes and banished for a year.

Sodomy is proven either by the perpetrator confessing four times or by the testimony of four trustworthy Muslim men, who were eyewitnesses to the act. If there are fewer than four witnesses, or if one is not upstanding, then they are all to be chastised with 80 lashes for slander. These safeguards contained in Sharia for capital crimes are not complied with, according to the ILGA. It considers that Saudi Arabia has

... failed to incorporate the procedural protections and safeguards that Sharia law has traditionally associated with the death penalty. ... factors such as the religion, citizenship, and social status of the accused can be a strong determinant of the conviction and severity of punishments, with working-class migrant workers usually being judged and treated more harshly than upper-class Saudi citizens.

— ILGA (2020). "Death Penalty: Saudi Arabia – Enforcement". State-sponsored Homophobia report.

In the 1980s, Saudi King Khaled issued numerous royal decrees designed to secure support among religious fundamentalists in the aftermath of an uprising of religious extremists in 1979, known as the Grand Mosque seizure.

The "Rules of Apprehension, Temporary Custody & Precautionary Detention Regulation" codified the criminal code on homosexuality by listing it among the crimes that warranted arrest and detention. In addition to law enforcement, a second royal decree formally established the Committee for the Promotion of Virtue and the Prevention of Vice (CPVPV) and gave this committee the power to arrest and detain people who violate the traditional teachings of Islam, including acts of homosexuality and cross-dressing.

Combating homosexuality remains one of the major goals of the CPVPV, along with its campaign against the consumption of alcohol and the practice of magic.

In September 2013, it was announced that all Gulf Cooperative Countries had agreed to discuss a proposal to establish some form of, yet unknown, testing in order to ban gay foreigners from entering any of the countries. However, it has been suggested that concern regarding the hosting of the 2022 FIFA World Cup by Qatar, and fears for the inevitable worldwide controversy if it is decided that football fans will have to be screened for homosexuality, made officials backtrack the plans and insist that it was a mere proposal.

According to a transcript published by Saudi state media in March 2022, Crown Prince Mohammed bin Salman, the de facto ruler of Saudi Arabia, stated in an interview with The Atlantic magazine that the death penalty has been abolished in the country, except for instances of murder or when an individual poses a threat to many people.

In 2019, to coincide with the introduction of tourist visas to the country, the Saudi government decreed a code to regulate the behavior of Saudi citizens and foreigners in public places. The new Public Decency Law contains nineteen regulations, violations of which are subject to fines. Proscribed practices include public displays of affection, wearing immodest clothing, using profanity, and displaying immoral advertising. Some behaviors unrelated to sexual or gender expression are also covered; for example, littering, taking photographs and videos of people without permission, and queue jumping. The authority of the religious police to intervene in such matters has been reduced, with the general police force being the "sole authority responsible for monitoring offenses and imposing fines".

=== Enforcement cases ===
In 2000, the Saudi Government reported that it had sentenced nine Saudi men to extensive prison terms with lashing for engaging in cross-dressing and homosexual relations.

In 2001, Saudi teacher and playwright Muhammad Al-Suhaimi was charged with promoting homosexuality and after a trial was sentenced to prison. In 2006, he was given a pardon and allowed to resume teaching.

In May 2005, the government arrested 92 men for homosexuality, who were given sentences ranging from fines to prison sentences of several months and lashings. Likewise, on 7 November 2005 Riyadh police raided what the Saudi press called a "beauty contest for gay men" at Al-Qatif. What became of the five men arrested for organizing the event is not known.

Persons caught living in the kingdom illegally are often accused of other crimes, involving illegal drugs, pornography, prostitution and homosexuality. Several such police crackdowns were reported in 2004–2005. A similar raid in 2008 netted Filipino workers arrested on charges of alcohol and gay prostitution. The Arab News newspaper article on the arrests stated, "Gay rights are not recognized in the Middle East countries and the publication of any material promoting them is banned".

International protests from human rights organizations prompted some Saudi officials within the Saudi Arabian embassy in Washington, D.C., to imply that their kingdom will only use the death penalty when someone has been convicted of child molestation, rape, sexual assault, murder or engaging in anything deemed to be a form of political advocacy.

In 2010, Prince Saud bin Abdulaziz bin Nasir al Saud was found guilty at the Old Bailey in London of murdering his servant Bandar Abdulaziz in their suite at the Landmark Hotel in London. During the trial, it was alleged that the prince had received a "sexual massage" before the murder, and that he and Abdulaziz had been in a sexual relationship. According to the prosecutor, the Prince sexually and physically abused his servant as well as paid other men for sexual services. He was sentenced to life imprisonment. In March 2013, he was allowed to return to Saudi Arabia to serve the remainder of his term in a Saudi prison. According to the agreement between the United Kingdom and Saudi Arabia, he must serve at least 20 years before he can be released.

In 2011–2012, the Saudi newspaper Okaz announced that the government had arrested over 260 people for the crime of homosexuality over a one-year period. According to the official report, the men were caught cross-dressing, wearing ladies' makeup and trying to pick up other men.

A gay Saudi diplomat named Ali Ahmad Asseri applied for asylum in the United States after he claimed the Saudi government discovered his sexuality and also because of dissent.

In 2014, a 24-year-old Saudi Arabian man was sentenced to three years' detention and 450 lashes after a Medina court found him guilty of "promoting the vice and practice of homosexuality", after he was caught using Twitter to arrange dates with other men.

In February 2017, 35 Pakistani transgender women were arrested at a party in Riyadh. Two were allegedly forced into sacks and beaten to death with sticks by Saudi authorities. State media reported that 35 men who were dressed as women and wearing make-up were arrested, but did not report that anyone from the event was executed, nor that any of the attendees were transgender. Reports of the deaths had circulated in Pakistani media by March, but the Saudi Interior Ministry denied that anyone was executed and claimed that the reports were false. The ministry later said that a 61-year-old Pakistani from the event died while in custody after suffering from a heart attack.

In April 2019, 37 Saudi men were beheaded on after confessing to terrorism and spying on the country for Iran. One of those executed, admitted to having sexual relationships with four of the other accused men and organizing during a trial held in 2016. He also admitted to organizing violent anti-government protests. His motive was that he opposed to the Sunni Sect of Islam due to his hatred of the state and the Saudi people.

On 13 October 2019, Saudi authorities arrested a 23-year-old national, Suhail al-Jameel, for posting a picture of himself wearing short shorts at the beach. He is a gay social media personality in Saudi Arabia, who openly documented his sexuality on Snapchat and Twitter. Al-Jameel wrote on Snapchat that he was arrested on the charges of sharing nudity online. Soon after fans started using a #freesuhail hashtag on Twitter. He was released from prison in October 2022.

In July 2022, Tala Safwan, a female Egyptian influencer living in Riyadh, posted a video chatting with a female Saudi friend. Safwan invited her friend to her house, saying that “everyone will be asleep” and that “no one will hear her scream.” Many in the country interpreted this as sexual innuendo, and Safwan was subsequently arrested.

== Same-sex relationships ==
Saudi Arabia bans same-sex marriage, domestic partnerships, and civil unions. The country neither recognizes nor performs these types of same-sex actions. The maximum punishment for same-sex behavior in Saudi Arabia is death.

== Censorship ==
The Saudi government censors the media. Fines, imprisonment and, for foreigners, deportation are imposed on any person possessing, importing, distributing or producing media without governmental approval. Media content, including advertising, cannot be seen as insulting the royal family or conflicting with Islamic teachings and values. Anything perceived to condone homosexuality or as support for LGBTQ rights can result in prosecution.

Homosexuality and cross-dressing are dealt with in print news through news coverage of criminal matters, the HIV/AIDS pandemic or allusions to perceived Western decadence.

Radio and TV programs are similarly banned from expressing support for LGBTQ rights, but homosexuality and cross-dressing can be discussed as long as the negative attitudes and biases are reinforced. For example, a call-in TV show may feature a discussion about the immorality or "illness" of homosexuality, or, as in the 2011 case of Mirel Radoi, a Romanian-born footballer playing in Saudi, coverage may focus on a celebrity expressing disapproving views. In the Radoi case, the footballer implied, as an insult, that an opponent he was complaining about was gay. (Radoi was fined and suspended from play for two matches by the Saudi football disciplinary committee for these remarks.)

The government has allowed public movie theaters since 2018, but the films are censored, as are the DVDs purchased in many retail stores. LGBTQ themes are generally one of the themes edited out of movies. Customs agents keep a list of films or TV shows that are not allowed to be brought into the kingdom. Foreign films that include small acknowledgments of a character's LGBTQ identity are often banned in the kingdom, even if the content or depiction is not sexually explicit.

Government regulation of the Internet generally falls under the Royal Decrees on Anti-Cyber Crime (2007). Article 6 prohibits creating, distributing or accessing online content or webpages that the government deems to be pornographic or in violation of religious values or public morals or is a threat to public health, safety or order.

The Saudi government has frequently blocked Internet users in the kingdom from accessing web pages or other online content that express support for LGBTQ rights. The restrictions on the Internet extend to blogs, social media and video upload webpages.

In 2010, a 27-year-old Saudi man was charged with homosexuality and impersonating a police officer when he posted a comical video of himself online, where he discusses popular culture, shows off his chest hair and flirts with the camera man. He was sentenced to a year in prison, with 1,000 lashes, and ordered to pay a fine of 5,000 rials (US$1,333).

In a crackdown across stores in the Saudi capital, Riyadh, according to the Saudi state-run TV channel al-Ekhbariya, government officials seized rainbow-colored clothing, products, toys, etc. The officials claimed that the June 2022 move was aimed at curbing the direct and indirect promotion of homosexuality in the country. An unnamed official from the Ministry of Commerce claimed that they were looking out for "slogans that violate the rules of Islam and public morals like promoting homosexuality colors, targeting the young generation." The items seized in the crackdown included hair accessories for children, backpacks, pencil cases, and rainbow stripes featured on crayon packs. When asked for comments from the Saudi authorities, none were received. In December 2022, authorities in neighboring Qatar carried out a similar purge.

== Gender identity ==
According to Human Rights Watch, Saudi Arabia has no laws against transgender people. Arrests and prosecutions of individuals wearing clothing not considered appropriate to their sex (cross-dressing), men wearing makeup, or "feminine" accessories, occur. Penalties include prison sentences and floggings.

Over the past 36 years, more than 2,000 individuals in Saudi Arabia have undergone sex reassignment surgeries (also known as "sex-correction surgeries" in Saudi Arabia) due to gender dysphoria. However, the Ministry of Health does not permit sex change operations, by which a person with a clear gender identity and matching physical features seeks to change sex.

In 2017, two transgender Pakistanis were allegedly "packed in sacks, thrashed with sticks and tortured to death" by Saudi police. A statement from the Saudi Interior Ministry, however, said the reports were "totally wrong and nobody was tortured".

People with a transsexual or transgender identity cards are not allowed to make the pilgrimage to Mecca. However, in February 2018 it was reported that a group of transgender individuals from Pakistan were allowed to be sent to Saudi Arabia for Hajj.

In March 2023, a 23-year old Saudi transgender woman, named Eden Knight, died by suicide after being forced to detransition by her family in Saudi Arabia.

=== Intersex rights ===
There are no bodily protections for intersex individuals in Saudi Arabia. Many intersex infants born with ambiguous genitalia suffer from infanticide. The killing of intersex infants is primarily motivated by fears of the social shame of having an intersex child. Intersex genital surgery on newborns for cosmetic purposes is fully legal and encouraged.

== Living conditions ==
=== Cultural norms ===
Unmarried women and families are generally kept separate from single men as much as possible, and dating is generally seen as being taboo and immoral. Opposite sex couples may be harassed if they demonstrate affection in public; however it is not uncommon to see heterosexual men seemingly expressing affection toward each other in public (e.g., kissing on the cheeks or holding hands.) The practice of men holding hands or kissing on the cheeks in public, is a social custom in parts of the Middle East and Asia; it is a symbol of friendship and not homosexuality. Bars and nightclubs are illegal. While the CPVPV views combating homosexuality as one of its major objectives, the targets of its interventions against improper socialising are more likely to be the mixed-sex, than the single-sex gathering.

=== Discrimination and harassment ===
Saudi Arabia has laws against discrimination on the basis of gender but not sexual orientation. Harassment or violence against LGBTQ people is not addressed in any bias-motivated or hate crime law. Advocacy for LGBTQ rights is illegal within the kingdom. The required exit and entry visa paperwork does not ask people about their sexual orientation, as it does their nationality, sex, religion and marital status. In 2011, Mirel Radoi, a Romanian football player who plays for the Saudi Alhilal Club, was fined 20,000 Saudi Riyals and suspended for two matches after calling a Saudi Arabian football player, Hussein Abdul Ghani, who plays for Nasr Club, gay. The public comment, intended as an insult, was highly controversial and generated quite a bit of coverage in the Saudi press, including the refusal of Hussein Abdul Ghani to shake hands with Mirel Radoi after a later game.

The climate of discrimination and fear among the LGBTQ community in Saudi Arabia means that only Saudis who have sought asylum abroad, such as Abdulrahman Alkhiary (also known as Wajeeh Lion), are able to publicly identify as gay. Alkhairy states that he is the first openly gay Saudi man.

=== Education ===
Public education in Saudi Arabia is required to teach basic Islamic values based on the interpretation of the Quran, which includes a strong condemnation of homosexuality. In addition, Islam condemns cross-dressing. The Ministry of Education approved textbooks that reflect the country's Islamic and cultural view against homosexual acts by stating that "homosexuality is one of the most disgusting sins and greatest crimes", and that the proper punishment for the intentional act of homosexual intercourse in public is capital punishment. However, in 2020 the Ministry of Education was found to have removed the condemnation of homosexuality as something punishable by death from textbooks.

In 2012, the Saudi government asked the CPVPV to assist in the expulsion of students who were judged, by their mannerisms and taste in fashion, to be gay or lesbian.

Private schools exist in Saudi Arabia, mainly to serve the needs of expatriates with children, and they are generally allowed more discretion in setting up their own school curriculum and policies. Unless a majority of the expatriate families are Muslim, the private school is likely to only teach the basic beliefs of Islam, through lessons about the culture, language and history of Saudi Arabia. Textbook content or policies regarding homosexuality or cross-dressing tends to be influenced by the prevailing attitudes of the expatriates and their country of origin.

=== Clubs and associations ===
Appearing to support or endorse homosexuality or LGBTQ rights can result in prosecution. This applies to individuals as well as clubs or associations operating the kingdom.

In MDLBeast Soundstorm, an annual multi-day music festival in Riyadh, observers have reported that it included the public display of LGBTQI+ culture.

The clandestine Green Party of Saudi Arabia, formed in 2001, expressed support for LGBTQ rights as part of its larger human rights platform. It is unclear if the party still exists, as reports are that its members were subjected to a government crackdown. A Facebook group for the party seems to still exist, as of 2024.

== HIV/AIDS ==
Officially, men who have sex with men account for a low number of HIV cases in the Kingdom of Saudi Arabia and little in the way of preventative educational materials exist for men who have sex with men, although a 2024 report from the Saudi AIDS National Program does make some mention of men who have sex with men.

Legally, Saudi citizens who are living with HIV/AIDS are classified as being disabled and thus are entitled to free medical care, which may include access PrEP, protection of their privacy (as to how they became infected), housing, and employment.

The government has produced or allowed NGOs to produce, educational material on how the disease has spread since the 1980s. Abdullah al-Hokail, a Saudi doctor who specializes in the pandemic, has been allowed to air public service announcements on television about the disease and how it is spread. Yet, ignorance, fear and prejudice are often directed at people living with the disease. While the government has designated several hospitals to treat those people infected with AIDS or HIV, other hospitals often refuse to care for such people or fail to treat them in a compassionate and humane manner. Hospitals and schools are often reluctant to distribute government information about the disease because of strong taboos and the stigma attached to how the virus can be spread. For example, condoms are legal, but until recently, they were rarely available anywhere other than certain hospitals or medical supply stores.

=== 1990s ===
In the late 1990s, the Saudi government began to step up a public education campaign about AIDS-HIV slowly. It started to recognize World AIDS Day, and the Arabic and English daily newspapers were permitted to run articles and opinions expressing the need for more education about the disease and more compassion for those infected.

=== 2003 ===
In 2003, the government announced that it knew of 6,787 cases, and in 2004 the official number rose to 7,808. The government statistics claim that most of the registered cases are foreign males who contracted the disease through "forbidden" sexual relations.

=== 2006 ===
In June 2006, the Ministry of Health publicly admitted that more than 10,000 Saudi citizens were either infected with HIV or had AIDS. In December 2006, the Arab News ran an editorial that called for greater public awareness of how the virus is spread and more compassion for those people infected. In the same year, a Saudi citizen named Rami al-Harithi revealed that he had become infected with HIV while having surgery and has become an official proponent of education and showing compassion to those people infected. Saudi Princess Alia bint Abdullah has been involved in the Saudi AIDS Society, which was permitted in December 2006 to hold a public charity art auction followed by a discussion on how the disease was impacting the kingdom; the event included participation by two Saudis living with HIV. It was organized with the help of the director-general of the AIDS Program at the Saudi Ministry of Health, Dr. Sana Filimban.

=== 2007 ===
In January 2007, a Saudi economics professor at King Abdul Aziz University was permitted to conduct of survey of a handful of Saudi University students on their level of education about the pandemic. While much of the work on AIDS-HIV education has been supported by members of the Saudi royal family or medical doctors, there is an attempt to gain permission to create some independent AIDS societies, one of which is called Al-Husna Society, that would work on helping people infected with the disease find employment, education families and work to fight the prejudice that faces people infected. In 2007, a government-funded organization, the National Society for Human Rights, published a document suggesting ways to improve the treatment of people living with the disease. The proposed "Bill of Rights" document was criticized by Human Rights Watch for allegedly undermining human rights and global efforts to fight the pandemic.

=== 2011 ===
According to a Gulf Cooperation Council report on HIV/AIDS, "Stigma and discrimination towards people living with HIV, weak surveillance system, travel restrictions and mandatory HIV testing along with gender inequalities were identified as critical issues that are hindering an effective AIDS response in the region."

=== Foreigners and HIV/AIDS ===
Foreigners who are applying for a work visa are required to demonstrate that they are not infected with the virus before they can enter the country, and are required to get a test upon arrival at a government accredited lab. To be issued their first work permit, they are also required to perform the test again before the renewal of a residency or work permit. Any foreigner that is discovered to be infected will be deported to the country of origin as soon as they are deemed fit to travel.

== Summary table ==
Same-sex sexual activity	No Capital punishment, imprisonment (discretionary: for variable terms, possibly up to life sentences – no set lengths codified), fines, flogging, deportation for foreign nationals upon completion of sentence (or in lieu)
Equal age of consent	No
Anti-discrimination laws in employment	No
Anti-discrimination laws in the provision of goods and services	No
Anti-discrimination laws in all other areas (incl. indirect discrimination, hate speech)	No
Same-sex marriage	No
Recognition of same-sex couples	No
Joint adoption by same-sex couples	No Adoption is not a legal option for anyone within the kingdom, in accordance with traditional Islamic jurisprudence
Stepchild adoption by same-sex couples	No Adoption is not a legal option for anyone within the kingdom
LGBTQ allowed to serve openly in the military	No
Right to change legal gender	No Sharia law, as interpreted in Saudi Arabia, prohibits legal gender change.
Free gender expression	No Sharia, as interpreted in Saudi Arabia, prohibits cross dressing
Access to IVF for lesbians	No Fertility treatments using donor sperm or ova are disallowed for everyone, including married heterosexual couples
Conversion therapy banned	No
Commercial surrogacy for gay male couples	No Gestational surrogacy is not legal for anyone, including married, opposite-sex couples
MSMs allowed to donate blood	No

== See also ==
- Capital punishment for homosexuality
- Criminalization of homosexuality
- Human rights in Saudi Arabia
- LGBTQ in Islam
- LGBTQ rights in the Middle East
