= Howard Strickling =

American film executive (1896–1982)

Howard Strickling (September 25, 1896 – July 16, 1982) served as head of publicity for Metro-Goldwyn-Mayer pictures from the late 1920s into the late 1960s.

== Biography ==
He was born in West Virginia; Strickling was in charge of the publicity surrounding MGM's films, and the studio's stars for what most film buffs consider the heyday of the company. He was also the voice-over announcer on several trailers for famous MGM films including Gone with the Wind, and all three theatrical releases of The Wizard of Oz (1939, 1949, and 1955).

Strickling was also well known in Hollywood as one of MGM's "fixers", along with studio vice-president, Eddie Mannix. Strickling and Mannix are the subject of E. J. Fleming's book The Fixers: Eddie Mannix, Howard Strickling and the MGM Publicity Machine (2004). According to the book, Strickling and Mannix were responsible for covering up or working to tone down several scandals, including pregnancies and abortions, surrounding high-profile MGM talent.

Strickling retired in the 1960s. He was married from 1930 until his wife died, in 1980. He died in Chino, California; on July 16, 1982, aged 85.

He was portrayed by actor Joe Spano in the 2006 film Hollywoodland, a semi-fictional account of the death of Superman star George Reeves. Strickling's friend, and fellow "fixer", Eddie Mannix was portrayed by the British actor Bob Hoskins.

== See also ==
- Harry Brand
- Eddie Mannix
