= The Navigator (Pocalyko novel) =

2013 book by Michael Pocalyko

- First edition cover
- Author: Michael Pocalyko
- Cover artist: Daniel Cullen
- Language: English
- Subject: investment banking information technology international business Washington politics
- Genre: financial thriller political thriller
- Publisher: Forge Books, Macmillan
- Publication date: June 11, 2013 (hardcover); March 25, 2014 (paperback)
- Publication place: United States
- Media type: Hardcover, Paperback, Audiobook and E-book
- Pages: 367 (Hardcover 1st edition)
- ISBN: 978-0-7653-3224-0

The Navigator is a literary financial thriller novel written by Michael Pocalyko and published by Forge Books, an imprint of Macmillan Publishers. It tells the story of "the world's first trillion dollar deal" against a backdrop of Wall Street dealmaking, Washington political intrigue, the relationship of two brothers, and international espionage.

== Plot ==
At the liberation of a German concentration camp in 1945, a B-24 navigator suffers a breakdown. In the present day, Richard Yeager, a less-than-successful financial executive, arrives for his first day at a Washington financial services firm where he is immediately mistakenly arrested in an FBI raid. His brother Warren Hunter is Wall Street's reigning master of the financial universe, running ViroSat, the world's first trillion dollar deal, popularly called "Internet Next." Yeager's ex-wife Julia Toussaint, with whom he begins again to become romantically involved, is a gorgeous African-American legislative aide to a very ambitious woman US Senator who wants the federal government to regulate ViroSat.

An old Jewish woman dies under mysterious circumstances and Yeager, her financial advisor, is stunned to learn that he has been named her sole heir. The eponymous navigator is revealed to be the father of the two brothers. He is dying, suffering from Alzheimer's and PTSD. Hunter, famous for self-control, takes enormous risks and begins to lose his grip, showing symptoms of psychological decomposition like his father. No one knows where Hunter plans to get the cash for the ViroSat deal. Yeager, Hunter, and Toussaint are forced to reconcile and cooperate despite difficult personal history; Hunter was responsible for Yeager and Toussaint divorcing.

Two old Cold War spies, powerful Washington lobbyists, the Mafia in New Jersey, the senator, a northern Virginia technology titan CEO, and an American-Israeli lawyer are all chasing after the money and threatening the brothers.

Misleading and using a quasi-government corporation, Hunter collects the cash for ViroSat. He closes the deal with partners in Dubai tied to a German merchant bank that disappeared during the Nazi era. Hunter reveals the closing at a dramatic US Senate hearing before a last attempt on his life. Yeager, suddenly a billionaire, finally realizes financial success.`

== Publication history ==
Tom Doherty, founder and publisher of Tor Books, purchased The Navigator in late 2011 for his Forge imprint and Michael Pocalyko revised the manuscript through the spring of 2013. Pocalyko's editor at Forge is Robert Gleason, author of the apocalyptic novels Wrath of God and End of Days.

The Navigator was released nationwide in the US by Macmillan on June 11, 2013, at almost exactly the moment that the NSA's mass surveillance of American citizens under the aegis of the Patriot Act was revealed. The book therefore received some media coverage, including the author's appearances on Booktalk Nation and The Authors Studio. Pocalyko was a guest on Lou Dobbs Tonight on publication day, discussing leaker Edward Snowden.

=== Critical reception ===
Publishers Weekly gave the book a starred review. Booklist gave it qualified praise. The NACD Directorship magazine reviewed the work. A local NPR member station book critic also praised the book.
