= Sybil Brand =

American human rights activist (c. 1899–2004)

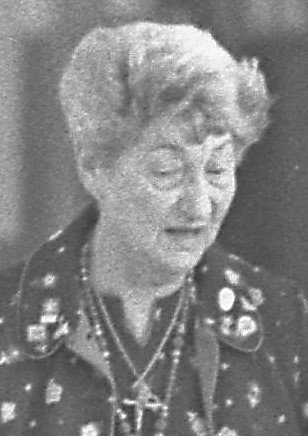
- Brand in 1986
- Born: Sybil Morris; May 8, c. 1899 (Note: Sources conflict on Brand's year of birth. She had variously stated she was born in 1899 or between 1901 and 1903. Brand's date of birth of record was May 8, 1902.); Chicago, Illinois, U.S.
- Died: February 17, 2004 (aged 104) (Note: Based on Brand's recorded 1902 date of birth, she would have been 101 years old when she died.); Beverly Hills, California, U.S.
- Spouse(s): Gabriel B. Leavy (December 6, 1926–19??) Harry Brand (m. 1933; died 1989)
- Children: 1

Sybil Brand (née Morris; May 8, c. 1899 – February 17, 2004) was an American philanthropist and activist, best known locally for her work in improving jail conditions for women in Los Angeles. She was the namesake of the Sybil Brand Institute (SBI), a women's jail in Los Angeles County.

== Early life ==
Sybil Morris was born in Chicago, Illinois to Jewish immigrant parents Abraham "A.W." Morris (c. 1877–1951) and Hattie Morris (c. 1883–1969) sometime between 1899 and 1903, with some of her friends favoring the earliest year.

Her father, a stockbroker, relocated the family to Los Angeles when Sybil was two years old. At age twelve, she began what would become a lifelong pursuit of charity and volunteering when she organized a diaper hemming program with the other girls in her class. Brand would later recall being inspired by meeting a young triple amputee in a hospital at the insistence of her mother.

== Prison reform ==
Already well-known in charity circles, Brand was first named to the Public Welfare Commission in 1945 by Los Angeles County Supervisor Leonard Roach. In the 1950s, Brand was serving on a commission that inspected hospitals and jails in Los Angeles County. As the only commissioner who volunteered to inspect the jails, Brand was appalled by the conditions in which women were jailed. At the time, some 1800 women were being held in facilities designed to hold 1300, on the thirteenth floor of the Los Angeles Hall of Justice.

After that incident, Brand led a drive to build a new county jail for women. On January 29, 1963, Los Angeles County opened the Sybil Brand Institute, which was forced to close after the 1994 Northridge earthquake. Budget shortfalls delayed its remodeling and reopening. Women prisoners most recently have been housed in the Twin Towers Correctional Facility in downtown Los Angeles.

== Personal life ==
Sybil Morris married her first husband, Gabriel "Gabe" Leavy in Los Angeles in 1926; they had one son, George. In 1933, she married her second husband, Harry Brand, who became head of publicity and advertising at 20th Century Fox.
