= Hollywoodland =

2006 American film by Allen Coulter

- Theatrical release poster
- Directed by: Allen Coulter
- Written by: Paul Bernbaum
- Produced by: Glenn Williamson
- Starring: Adrien Brody; Diane Lane; Ben Affleck; Bob Hoskins
- Cinematography: Jonathan Freeman
- Edited by: Michael Berenbaum
- Music by: Marcelo Zarvos
- Production company: Back Lot Pictures
- Distributed by: Focus Features (United States); Miramax Films (International; through Buena Vista International)
- Release dates: August 31, 2006 (Venice); September 8, 2006 (United States)
- Running time: 126 minutes
- Country: United States
- Language: English
- Budget: $14 million
- Box office: $16.8 million

Hollywoodland is a 2006 American mystery drama film directed by Allen Coulter and written by Paul Bernbaum. The story presents a fictionalized account of the circumstances surrounding the death of actor George Reeves (Ben Affleck), the star of the 1950s film Superman and the Mole Men and the television series Adventures of Superman. Adrien Brody stars as a fictional character, Louis Simo, a private detective investigating Toni Mannix (Diane Lane); who was involved in a long romantic relationship with Reeves and was the wife of MGM studio executive Eddie Mannix (Bob Hoskins). Reeves had ended the affair and had become engaged to a younger woman, aspiring actress Leonore Lemmon (Robin Tunney).

Development for Hollywoodland began in 2001 when Focus Features purchased Bernbaum's script, titled Truth, Justice, and the American Way. Michael and Mark Polish were set to direct with Benicio del Toro in the lead role, but Focus Features placed the film in turnaround to Miramax Films the following year. Ultimately, Truth, Justice, and the American Way became a joint production between the two studios, and filming commenced in May 2005, with veteran television director Coulter making his feature film directorial debut. Due to copyright issues with Warner Bros. and DC Comics, the film was retitled Hollywoodland and released to generally positive reviews with high praise for Affleck's performance.

== Plot ==
In June 1959, Louis Simo, a sleazy Los Angeles private investigator, is spying on the wife of a man named Chester Sinclair to learn if she is having an affair. On a visit to his own ex-wife Laurie, Simo learns that his son is upset over the recent death of actor George Reeves; having been found dead inside his Beverly Hills home with a gunshot wound to the head, which the police ruled as a suicide.

Simo learns from a former police colleague that the Reeves suicide has aspects that the police do not want to touch. Sensing the potential for making a name for himself, Simo begins investigating and notes several apparent conflicts with the official version of Reeves's death. He also bickers with Laurie over his failures as a father, particularly now when his son seems so troubled.

Eight years earlier, Reeves, whose acting career has stalled since appearing in Gone with the Wind, catches the eye of a beautiful woman and they end the night in each other's arms. In the morning, a newspaper photo reveals to Reeves that the woman is Toni Mannix, the wife of Eddie Mannix, the general manager of Metro-Goldwyn-Mayer. Frightened that an affair with a studio boss's wife will destroy what is left of his career, Reeves is angry that Toni did not tell him. She claims to have an open relationship with Mannix and tells Reeves not to worry about it. She also buys the impoverished Reeves a new house and a new car, and lavishes him with jewelry and other luxuries.

Reeves lands the starring role in the television series Adventures of Superman, based on the comic book superhero. The role makes Reeves famous and gives him a steady income, but he longs for more "serious" work and is uncomfortable with the public's stereotype of him as Superman. When a sneak preview of the war film From Here to Eternity results in snickers from the audience when Reeves is seen onscreen, film executives attending the preview decide to drastically reduce his formerly prominent role.

As the years pass, Reeves also becomes embittered at being Toni's kept man and blames her for not using Mannix's influence to get him better roles. He barbecues his Superman costume to "celebrate" the program's cancellation in 1958. He also meets a young woman in New York City, actress Leonore Lemmon, and leaves Toni for her. Toni, brokenhearted and furious, seethes at her "mistreatment" by Reeves.

Simo initially suspects that Leonore might have accidentally shot Reeves during an argument and imagines how the scenario might have played out. Simo is beaten in his home by thugs, apparently working for Mannix, who are trying to scare him off the case. This, and other evidence, leads Simo to suspect that Mannix was the one who had Reeves murdered. Simo also has a vision of how that killing would have occurred.

Simo's original client – Sinclair – murders his wife, having grown impatient waiting for Simo's report. A guilt-plagued Simo gets drunk, then visits his son's school, where his inebriation scares the boy. Simo visits Reeves's manager, Arthur Weissman, who has a home movie that Reeves shot in order to promote some wrestling work. Reeves's sadness and disappointment with his life are evident in the footage. Simo's final imagined variation on Reeves's death concludes with the actor committing suicide. This is the most vivid of the three scenarios, and Simo imagines himself in the upstairs bedroom, watching it unfold.

Each of the scenes imagined by Simo begins with Reeves playing a guitar and singing "Green Eyes (Aquellos Ojos Verdes)" in Spanish for his house guests. After each of the three imagined renditions, Reeves says good night to his guests, then retires to his bedroom upstairs, just before the gunshot.

Reeves's quest for success and Simo's realization of parallels to his own existence cause the detective to re-evaluate his life. Simo watches another home movie, this one of himself, Laurie, and their son in happier days. He goes to Laurie's house wearing a suit and tie, greeting his son hopefully.

== Cast ==
- Adrien Brody as Louis Simo
- Diane Lane as Toni Mannix
- Ben Affleck as George Reeves
- Bob Hoskins as Eddie Mannix
- Robin Tunney as Leonore Lemmon
- Kathleen Robertson as Carol Van Ronkel
- Lois Smith as Helen Bessolo
- Larry Cedar as Chester Sinclair
- Caroline Dhavernas as Kit Holliday
- Kevin Hare as Robert Condon
- Molly Parker as Laurie Simo
- Zach Mills as Evan Simo
- Neil Crone as Chuck
- Seamus Dever as Phillip
- Gareth Williams as Del
- Dash Mihok as Sergeant Jack Paterson
- Veronica Watt as Rita Hayworth
- Todd Grinnell as Times Reporter
- Joe Spano as Howard Strickling
- Jeffrey DeMunn as Art Weissman

== Production ==
Focus Features acquired a spec script written by Paul Bernbaum in December 2001 titled Truth, Justice, and the American Way. They courted Michael and Mark Polish to direct, with Diane Lane attached to costar, but Focus placed the film in turnaround in June 2002. Miramax Films picked up the rights and hoped for the Polish brothers to begin filming that year with Benicio del Toro as the potential lead, a role also considered for Joaquin Phoenix. Kyle MacLachlan was in the running to play George Reeves, after an audition and having worked with the Polish brothers on Northfork, while Hugh Jackman, Colin Firth and Mark Ruffalo were reportedly the top contenders. However, the Polish brothers were replaced with television director Allen Coulter over creative differences.

Filming was delayed to April 2004, and Del Toro was still attached to the lead role, pending script revisions. Ben Affleck, Dennis Quaid and Viggo Mortensen were added to the list of actors under consideration for George Reeves, alongside Sharon Stone and Annette Bening for Toni Mannix. The film was finally greenlit when the project moved back to Focus Features in 2005, and Howard Korder was brought on to do an uncredited rewrite of Bernbaum's script.

Adrien Brody was cast as Louis Simo, and Affleck eventually won the supporting role of Reeves. He saw Truth, Justice, and the American Way as an opportunity to disassociate himself from the many big-budget action films he had been starring in. It marked his first leading or supporting role in a film in two years. "I was really unhappy finding myself perpetually in the sights of paparazzi cameras and in the gossip magazines. This character was broken, but he's also the archetype of all those kinds of guys I had played — the actual, real version, which is damaged and somehow unhappy and trying to be something other than what he is. And to me, that made it infinitely more interesting." Affleck watched all 108 episodes of the Adventures of Superman, met with Jack Larson, the actor who portrayed Jimmy Olsen in the TV show, read various books about Reeves' life and death, and gained 20 pounds to closely resemble the actor with contact lenses and subtle use of facial prosthesis. In addition, he listened to hours of Reeves' voice on CD so he could get the same intonations and timbre. Filming began in Toronto, Canada, in May 2005.

=== Copyright ===
Focus Features was forbidden from showing the Superman 'S' in promotional materials.

During its production, Hollywoodland went through many rounds of getting clearance from Warner Bros. Pictures to use different aspects of Reeves' Superman persona to reflect the actual nature of his career. Time Warner is the parent company of both Warner Bros. and DC Comics and has the final say in the depiction of characters relating to their properties.

The film's first title was Truth, Justice, and the American Way, Superman's well-known patriotic catchphrase, but Warner Bros. threatened legal action unless the film's title was changed so as not to associate the classic slogan with Reeves' death—especially since Warner Bros. was banking the film Superman Returns, which was released a few months earlier in June 2006. The filmmakers changed the title to Hollywoodland, not as a reflection of the ailing Hollywood Sign, but in reference to the milieu of "movieland". The filmmakers wished to use the familiar filmed opening of Adventures of Superman in context within Hollywoodland, but Warner Bros. refused to license clips from the show. The film recreated the show's opening and substituted a re-recorded version of the opening theme.

== Historical liberties ==
Hollywoodland takes liberties with events for dramatic purposes. Several events and places are condensed to fit into the film, including:

- The film states that if the first season of Adventures of Superman was successful, they would film the second season in color. The series did not film in color until the third season.
- During a personal appearance at a children's Wild West show, George Reeves meets a boy with a loaded gun, who wishes to shoot him. While remaining in character as Superman, Reeves dissuades the boy by confirming that the bullets will bounce off of him, but would hurt innocent bystanders. Although Reeves often told this story himself, all subsequent researchers have been unable to corroborate his account.
- Reeves' scenes in From Here to Eternity are shown with Superman-related audience heckling during a test screening, followed by director Fred Zinneman turning to the movie editor and making a scissors gesture, effectively issuing an order to reduce Reeves' screen time. This is based on an urban legend that originates with Reeves's co-star Jack Larson's claim that he saw From Here to Eternity on opening day and again 25 years later, and that there were fewer scenes with Reeves on his second viewing. However, every draft of the screenplay contains the same set of scenes for Reeves, which appear in the finished cut of the film. Moreover, screenwriter Daniel Taradash has said he never wrote any scenes for Reeves's character other than those which appear in the finished film, and Zinneman, the film's editor, the film's assistant director, and several cast members have all said that no scenes were ever cut from the film following its first audience screenings. Reeves's name does not appear in the supporting cast credits page, giving rise to the implication that his presence, if not his role, was somewhat diminished. Despite the premise that his performance as United States Army Sergeant Maylon Stark was pared down, no deleted footage of Reeves has ever been proven to exist.
- The film has Reeves promoting some wrestling work. In real life, Reeves never wrestled professionally and did not have any offers to do so at the time of his death.

== Reception ==
=== Critical response ===
On the review aggregator website Rotten Tomatoes, the film holds an approval rating of 68% based on 181 reviews, with an average rating of 6.6/10. The website's critics consensus reads, "More than a movie star murder mystery, Hollywoodland takes it slow to reveal the intriguing details of the rise and fall of superstar fame." According to Metacritic, which assigned a weighted average score of 62 out of 100 based on 33 critics, the film received "generally favorable" reviews.

Ben Affleck earned the Volpi Cup for Best Actor at the Venice Film Festival for his portrayal of George Reeves. He was also nominated for the Golden Globe Award for Best Supporting Actor – Motion Picture, but lost to Eddie Murphy for his performance in Dreamgirls. Hoskins and Lane were also applauded for their performances. Critics at The Wall Street Journal and Vanity Fair called Hollywoodland a possible Academy Award contender, but the film received no Oscar nominations.

=== Box office ===
Hollywoodland grossed $14.4 million in the United States and $2.4 million in other territories, for a worldwide total of $16.8 million.

The film grossed $6 million in its opening weekend, finishing second at the box office.

The film made $9.1 million in DVD rentals and a spot in the top ten DVD sales for its first three weeks of release.

=== Accolades ===
| Award | Category | Recipient(s) | Result |
|---|---|---|---|
| Golden Globe Awards | Best Supporting Actor | Ben Affleck | Nominated |
| Broadcast Film Critics Association Awards | Best Supporting Actor | Ben Affleck | Nominated |
| Chicago Film Critics Association Awards | Best Supporting Actor | Ben Affleck | Nominated |
| Saturn Awards | Best Supporting Actor | Ben Affleck | Won |
| Hollywood Film Awards | Supporting Actor of the Year | Ben Affleck | Won |
| Venice Film Festival | Best Actor | Ben Affleck | Won |
| St. Louis Gateway Film Critics Association | Best Supporting Actor | Ben Affleck | Nominated |
| St. Louis Gateway Film Critics Association | Best Cinematography | Jonathan Freeman | Nominated |
