= Eddie Mannix =

American fixer (1891–1963)

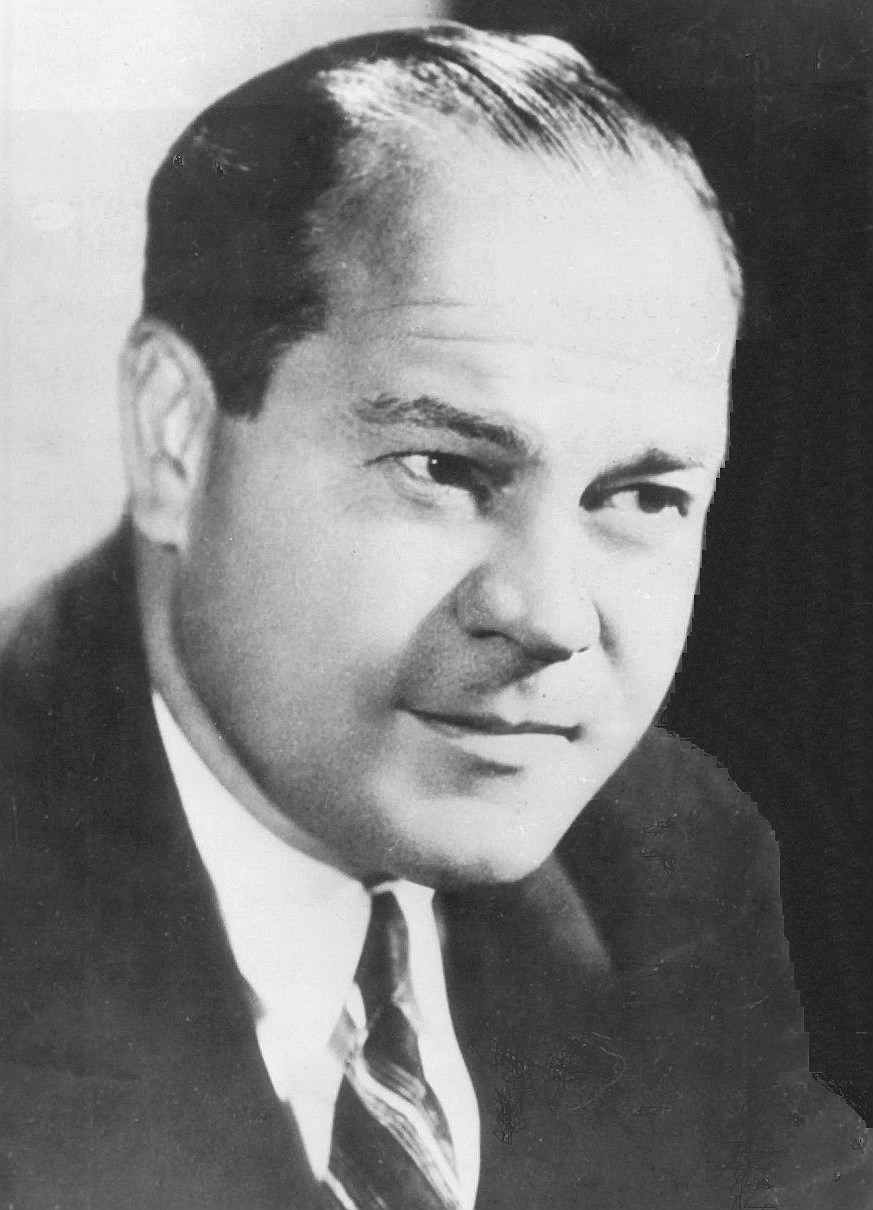
- Mannix in 1935
- Born: Joseph Edgar Allen John Mannix; February 25, 1891; Fort Lee, New Jersey, U.S.
- Died: August 30, 1963 (aged 72); Beverly Hills, California, U.S.
- Resting place: Holy Cross Cemetery, Culver City, California
- Other name: Edgar Joseph Mannix
- Occupations: Film studio executive, producer
- Spouse(s): Bernice Fitzmaurice (m. 1916; died 1937) Toni Mannix (m. 1951)

Joseph Edgar Allen John Mannix (February 25, 1891 – August 30, 1963) was an American film studio executive and producer. He is remembered for his long career at Metro-Goldwyn-Mayer as a "fixer", who was paid to cover up Hollywood stars' often colorful private lives to protect their public image and profitability for the studio.

Among his most lasting contributions to Hollywood was a ledger he maintained that listed the costs and revenues of every film Metro-Goldwyn-Mayer produced from 1924 to 1962, an important reference for film historians.

== Early life ==
Mannix was born in Fort Lee, New Jersey, the son of John and Lizzie (née Striker) Mannix. Christened Joseph Edgar Allen John Mannix, he used Edgar Joseph Mannix as his official name, but was known to most associates as Eddie. He was of Irish Catholic descent.

== Career ==
After working as a bouncer and then treasurer of the Palisades Amusement Park, he became involved in motion picture exhibition, then was sent to Hollywood in 1925. He eventually worked his way up to general manager within Metro-Goldwyn-Mayer in the 1920s.

The Eddie Mannix Ledger is in the Margaret Herrick Library at Fairbanks Center for Motion Picture Study.

Although Mannix largely retired from MGM in August 1958 due to health issues, he maintained an advisory position with the studio, particularly in the area of industrial relations.

== Personal life ==
Mannix was married twice and had no children. He married Bernice Fitzmaurice in 1916. Mannix had numerous affairs during the marriage, but the couple remained married due to their Catholicism. However, in late 1937, Bernice petitioned for divorce, claiming that Mannix physically abused her and citing the affairs. Before the divorce was officially filed, Bernice died in a car accident outside Palm Springs, California on November 18, 1937.

After Bernice's death, Mannix began living with actress and Ziegfeld Follies dancer Toni Lanier, with whom he had been having an affair. They married in May 1951 and remained married until Mannix's death in 1963.

Mannix was suspected of involvement in the death of actor George Reeves, the star of the television series Adventures of Superman. Reeves had begun having an affair with Mannix's wife Toni in 1951. Mannix reportedly approved of the affair, which was an open secret in Hollywood. Eddie Mannix was simultaneously having a long-term affair with a Japanese woman. As Mannix and his wife were Catholics who did not believe in divorce, the arrangement continued for the next several years. Reeves, however, ended the affair in early 1959 and soon became engaged to socialite Leonore Lemmon, which devastated Toni. Reeves died of a gunshot wound to the head at his home on June 16, 1959. His death was ruled a suicide, but controversy has surrounded that ruling ever since. Rumors arose that Mannix, who was rumored to have had connections to organized crime, had arranged for Reeves to be murdered by a hitman. Kashner and Schoenberger's partially fictionalized biography Hollywood Kryptonite alleged, without citing any sources, that Toni Lanier Mannix, using her husband's criminal connections, ordered George Reeves' murder.

== Later years and death ==
Mannix suffered from a heart condition. By 1959, he had survived several heart attacks and used a wheelchair. On August 30, 1963, he died of a heart attack at his Beverly Hills, California home at age 72. He is buried at the Holy Cross Cemetery in Culver City, Los Angeles County.

== In popular culture ==
- Bob Hoskins portrayed Mannix in the 2006 biographical film Hollywoodland, based on the life and death of Adventures of Superman actor George Reeves, who is played in the film by Ben Affleck.
- Eddie Mannix is Louis B. Mayer's right-hand man in When Garbo Talks! a 2010 world premiere musical at Long Beach Performing Arts Center where LB and Eddie trick Swedish director Mauritz Stiller into bringing Greta Garbo to Hollywood as a contract player for MGM.
- Josh Brolin portrayed Mannix in the 2016 Coen brothers film Hail, Caesar!, which satirizes the American film industry of the 1950s, and which was very loosely based on Mannix's career as a fixer. The film shows Mannix scrambling to solve the kidnapping of an A-list movie star, while battling to keep multiple thinly fictionalized send-ups of real Hollywood scandals of the era out of the tabloids. Behind it all, however, Mannix is depicted as a devout, if sinful and unconventional, Roman Catholic family man with two children and a doting homemaker wife.
- Eddie Mannix is a minor character in the Gore Vidal novel Myron.

== See also ==
- Harry Brand
- Howard Strickling
- Mary Nolan
