= Abdulrahman Alkhiary =

Gay Saudi Arabian journalist with political asylum in the U.S.

Wajeeh Gay Lion
- Born: 1992/93; Saudi Arabia
- Other name: Wajeeh Gay Lion
- Occupations: Activist, journalist
- Known for: LGBT+ activism, being the first openly gay Saudi man

Wajeeh Gay Lion (Arabic: وجيه لايون; born 1992/1993), also known as Wajeeh Lion, is a Saudi-American human rights activist, journalist, and self-described first openly gay Saudi man.

== Early life and asylum ==
Lion left Saudi Arabia at age 12, when his parents moved to the United States. He attended Kansas State University, where he studied economics and political science. In his senior year, he accepted that he was gay.

Lion applied for asylum in the United States in 2013, knowing that he would have to go back to Saudi Arabia after his student visa expired.

His family found out he was gay in 2016. Following this, they "immediately tried to send him back to Saudi Arabia and force him into conversion therapy. Wajeeh managed to escape after two years of planning and legal connections".

He was granted asylum in September 2018, with help from Kansas State University. He told an interviewer that he was under 'direct threat of being kidnapped' after his parents found out about his sexuality, and he spent a few months in a safehouse as a result.

== Activism ==
Lion told WIRED that the Saudi government uses bots on Twitter to control the political narrative in the Kingdom and harass activists like himself: “The sole focus is to control Twitter’s trending algorithm in Saudi Arabia and force public opinion using bot accounts”.

Lion has spoken out about the repression of dissidents and gay people in Saudi Arabia, telling Insider that: "Most people I know in Saudi have two phones... One that has the government apps and another that has all of the other apps".

Lion was a member on the board of directors for the Kansas City Anti-Violence Program, a nonprofit dedicated services to LGBTQ youth, and is currently a board member of the Kansas City Health Commission Housing Committee, and a board member for Missourians for Alternatives to the Death Penalty. He has also won an International Leadership Award from the Kansas State Alumni Center.

Lion has written about LGBTQ rights in Saudi Arabia, and has been a media commentator on gay rights in the Gulf.

== Personal life ==
Lion lives in Minneapolis, Minnesota
