= Sybil Brand Institute =

Women's jail in Monterey Park, California, US

Coordinates: 34.056°N 118.168°W

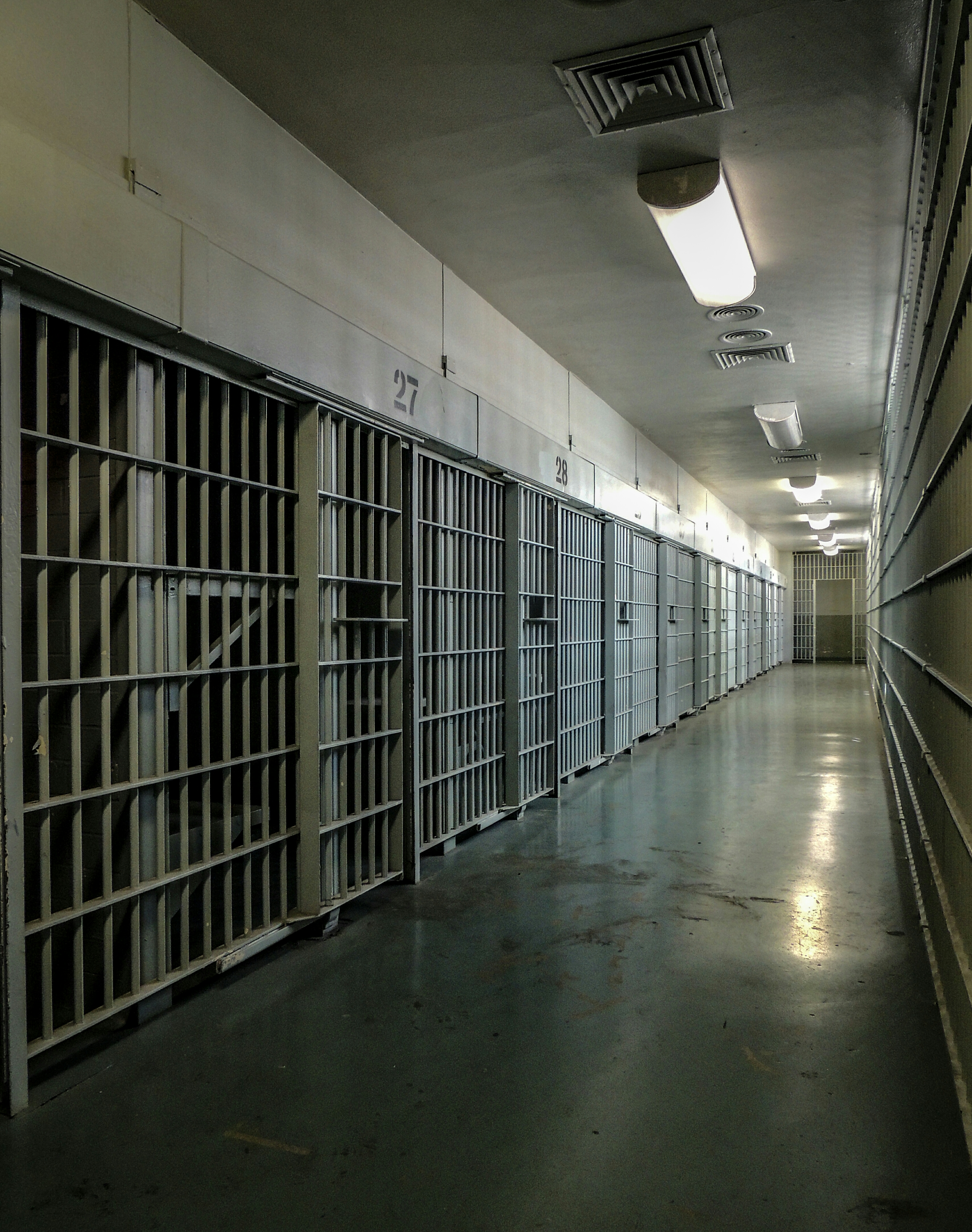
A cell block at Sybil Brand Institute

The Sybil Brand Institute is a disused women's jail in Monterey Park, Los Angeles County, California. It is named for 20th century jail conditions activist Sybil Brand.

The jail was completed in 1963 and at one time had over 2,000 inmates. It was closed in 1997 because of its poor physical condition as a result of damage suffered during the 1994 Northridge earthquake.

The jail was referenced in the legal drama TV series Perry Mason in the 1965 episode "The Case of the Laughing Lady".

Hedy Lamarr was briefly jailed at the Sybil Brand Institute after being arrested for shoplifting in January 1966.

The jail is referenced in Kate Braverman's 1993 fiction novel Wonders of the West starting on the very first page of the text.

Since 1997, the former jail location has been used in movies and television shows such as 24, Reno 911!: Miami, CSI, Legally Blonde, Torchwood: Miracle Day Desperate Housewives, Jackie Brown, and S.W.A.T..
