= Crimes of indecency in Scots law =

Certain laws are in place in Scotland to protect the welfare of children under the age of puberty. In Scotland and in the legal sense, puberty is at the age of 12 for females and 14 for the age of males.

Definition: "A crime at common law for any person to indulge in indecent practises towards children under the age of puberty, whether they are consenting or not". Examples of this could include indecently exposing private parts of a female or male to young children, improper handling of the private parts of children, inducing children to handle the private parts of others and taking indecent photographs of children.

Indecent conduct could be constituted as being criminal in some circumstances, e.g. indecent exposure, sexual intercourse in public view. The public element of the offence is not that it must take place in public but that it is a crime against public morals. The offence could be committed almost anywhere, including the person's own home if it could be seen through an open window by a person outside. Determination of indecency will depend on the time and place. For example, certain sex theatre shows are not illegal as they are advertised as such and should therefore not be offensive to the public if in enclosed viewing. So long as the public as aware of the content of the show, it would not be regarded as public indecency.

Indecent assault an aggravation of the common law offence of assault, aggravated by the indecent manner in which it is committed. An assault may be indecent irrespective of the intention or motive of the accused and it does not need to be shown that the accused committed the assault for sexual gratification.
