= Toni Mannix =

American actress

- Mannix in the 1930s
- Born: Camille Bernice Froomess; February 19, 1906; New York City, U.S.
- Died: September 2, 1983 (aged 77); Beverly Hills, California, U.S.
- Other names: Toni Lanier, Camille Toni Mannix
- Occupations: Actress, dancer
- Spouse: Eddie Mannix (m. 1951; died 1963)

Toni Lanier Mannix (born Camille Bernice Froomess; February 19, 1906 – September 2, 1983) was an American actress and dancer in early motion pictures filmed with soundtracks, known as "talkies". Going by the name Toni Lanier, she became known in Hollywood circles for her extramarital relationship with future husband MGM studio head Eddie Mannix, who was married at the time to Bernice Fitzmaurice. Following Fitzmaurice's death in 1937, Lanier moved in with Mannix. The couple married in 1951. It was not long after her marriage to Mannix that she began a notorious affair with actor George Reeves, also in 1951.

== Early life ==
Mannix was born Camille Bernice Froomess on February 19, 1906 in New York City. Her father, Charles, was a French immigrant, and her mother, Elizabeth, was a French Canadian Roman Catholic. The large family would ultimately include 11 children: seven boys and four girls. The children were raised in their mother's faith. Mannix's father was a department store window decorator in Rochester, New York, and her mother was a homemaker.

== Career ==
For a time, Mannix was a Ziegfeld Follies showgirl and appeared in the Metro-Goldwyn-Mayer biography of Florenz Ziegfeld's life, The Great Ziegfeld (1936).

== Personal life ==
Toni Lanier, the Ziegfeld dancer and actress met MGM's general manager Eddie Mannix in the 1930s. She later lived with him as his mistress, and then as his wife, until he died in 1963. Shortly after her marriage to Mannix in 1951 and shortly before the launch of George Reeves to stardom in the successful television series Adventures of Superman, Mannix met and began an extramarital affair with Reeves, with the permission of her husband, according to Reeves' co-stars Noel Neill and Jack Larson.

Reeves ended the affair in 1958 after meeting and starting a relationship with "B-girl" Leonore Lemmon in New York while he was traveling on business. His death by gunshot wound to the head five months later was officially ruled a suicide, although questions have been raised about the circumstances under which he died. Mannix was devastated by Reeves' death and remained dedicated to him, reportedly building a shrine to him in her house.

== In popular culture ==
- In the 2006 Allen Coulter film Hollywoodland, Toni Mannix is portrayed by Diane Lane.
