= Michael Pocalyko =

American businessman and writer (born 1954)

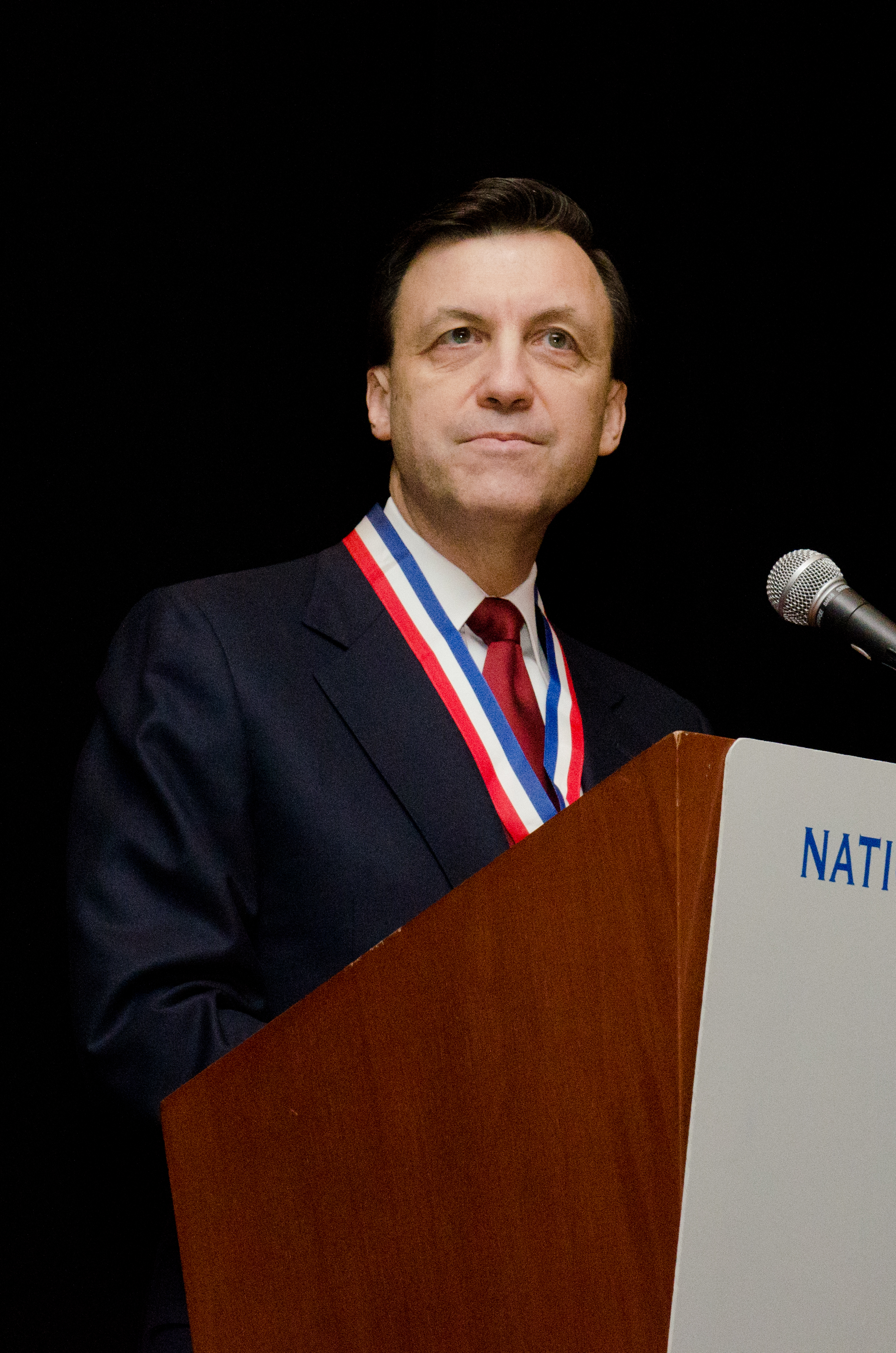
- Pocalyko in 2011
- Born: December 24, 1954 (age 71); Fountain Hill, Pennsylvania, U.S.
- Education: Muhlenberg College; Harvard Kennedy School; Wharton School
- Occupations: Investment banker; CEO of Monticello Capital; novelist
- Spouse: Barbara Snelbaker Pocalyko
- Website: michaelpocalyko.com

Michael Nicholas Pocalyko (/poʊˈkælɪkoʊ/; born December 24, 1954) is an American businessman and writer.

Pocalyko is the managing director and chief executive officer of Monticello Capital, a boutique investment bank in Chantilly, Virginia, specializing in high tech and green enterprises. He is a Sarbanes-Oxley public company audit committee financial expert and corporate board audit committee chairman. His novel The Navigator, a literary financial thriller, was published in 2013 by Forge Books, an imprint of Macmillan Publishers.

In March 2023, Pocalyko attracted media attention for his involvement in the suicide of Eden Knight.

== Early life and education ==
Pocalyko was born on December 24, 1954, in Fountain Hill, Pennsylvania.

He attended Muhlenberg College in Allentown, Pennsylvania, where he graduated in 1976. He received his Master in Public Administration degree from Harvard Kennedy School in 1985. He earned an MBA from the Wharton School in 1995.

He was a trustee of Fairleigh Dickinson University and named by the International Association of University Presidents to the United Nations Commission on Disarmament Education, Conflict Resolution and Peace.

== Career ==
=== Navy ===
Pocalyko was commissioned as an officer in the US Navy in 1976 and qualified as a naval aviator in 1977. He later became dual-warfare qualified at sea as a surface warfare officer. He served in the US Atlantic Fleet flying the SH-3, SH-2, and SH-60 helicopters, deploying in destroyers and frigates in the LAMPS and LAMPS Mark III platforms. During his career as a pilot, Pocalyko made more than 1,000 helicopter small deck landings.

He served in the Multinational Force in Lebanon and was the pilot in command of the only helicopter airborne at the moment of the Beirut barracks bombing on October 23, 1983. He also commanded special intelligence missions in the Persian Gulf.

In the mid-1980s he was desk officer for the Navy’s Forward Maritime Strategy and then special assistant to Vice Admiral Henry C. Mustin II in the office of the Chief of Naval Operations. In the early 1990s he was on the personal staff of Secretary of the Navy H. Lawrence Garrett III during the Tailhook scandal. In his 1998 book Against All Enemies, investigative journalist Seymour Hersh wrote approvingly about Pocalyko's role as a veterans advocate with respect to the controversial Persian Gulf War Syndrome during his years in the Office of the Secretary of Defense from 1993 to 1995.

He retired from the Navy in the grade of commander in 1995.

=== Investment banking and business ===
Starting in 1997, Pocalyko served as a managing director at the investment firm Monticello Capital.

Pocalyko served on more than a dozen corporate boards and is a "public company audit committee financial expert" under the Sarbanes-Oxley Act. He was a director and audit committee chairman of defense contractor Herley Industries, brought in after that company’s chairman was indicted. He also chaired the board of TherimuneX Pharmaceuticals, a biotechnology company in Doylestown, Pennsylvania. Pocalyko served as a non-executive board chairman with water treatment firm Erdevel Europa Saudi Arabia and environmental management company Envambien SA.

=== Politics ===
In 1984, Pocalyko became one of The Heritage Foundation's "Third Generation," the "young leaders of [an] army of conservative activists." It was his "Third Generation Military Leadership" that first gained him national notice on the political stage. Pocalyko served terms on the Fairfax County, Virginia's Industrial Development Authority and on Virginia's Commonwealth Competition Council, appointed by Governor Jim Gilmore as the governor's representative and remaining during part of the administration of Governor Mark Warner.

He was a district chairman for six years in the Republican Party of Virginia.

==== 1999 Virginia House campaign ====
In 1999, he was the endorsed Republican candidate for the Virginia House of Delegates from the 36th District, in Reston and western Fairfax County, Virginia, and ran against incumbent Democrat Ken Plum, then chairman of the Democratic Party of Virginia. Pocalyko campaigned as a "progressive Republican" in the left-leaning district with strong backing from Senator John Warner, a Capitol Hill mentor, and from Governor Jim Gilmore. He took conservative positions on limited government, fiscal matters and taxation (although he refused to sign the Americans for Tax Reform "Taxpayer Protection Pledge"), law and order, Second Amendment rights, faith-based initiatives, and backing the death penalty, but was moderate on issues like the environment, immigration, and public education. He was among the very few Virginia GOP candidates who met with gay community leaders; he pledged active support for expanded gay and lesbian rights and appeared at Log Cabin Republican events. Pocalyko was endorsed by former Director of Central Intelligence Stansfield Turner.

Pocalyko was criticized by The Washington Post for a leaflet distributed by his campaign accusing his opponent of "voting to protect child molesters who murder children." Pocalyko lost the election to Plum by 61.83 percent to 35.42 percent of the vote.

=== Special Investigations Limited Company ===
In 2014, Pocalyko founded Special Investigations Limited Company, "a professional services firm and government contractor in the investigations, intelligence, and cyber sectors." As of March 2023, Special Investigations had received three awards of not more than $95,000 from the United States Department of Commerce for "Investigation and Personal Background Check Services."

In March 2023, Special Investigations faced criticism for Pocalyko's alleged role in the suicide of Eden Knight. Knight, a transgender woman, was lured back to her family in Saudi Arabia, where she was forced to detransition and later died by suicide.

=== Publications ===
Since the 1970s, Pocalyko has published newspaper features, academic papers, essays, reviews, and opinion pieces. His novel The Navigator was published by Forge Books, an imprint of Macmillan Publishers.

Pocalyko has published a number of papers on a variety of subjects, especially in the areas of defense, international affairs, and corporate governance. He was a member of the Council on Foreign Relations and was on the CFR's bipartisan independent task force co-chaired by Madeleine Albright and Vin Weber, which authored In Support of Arab Democracy: Why and How.

== Personal life ==
Pocalyko married his classmate Barbara Snelbaker after their college graduation in 1976. They have two children. He lives in Reston in Northern Virginia and on the Blue Ridge in the Shenandoah Valley. Pocalyko is a member of the Cosmos Club, serving as vice president and treasurer before being chosen as the club's president in May 2023.
