= Public Decency Law in Saudi Arabia =

2019 Saudi law

Public Decency Law in Saudi Arabia is a set of rules issued in September 2019 by the government of Saudi Arabia to ensure that citizens and tourists are aware of the rules related to the public decency and are in compliance with Saudi law.

== Background ==
The Saudi Arabian society was generally in compliance with unwritten rules of public decency that was commonly defined by their traditions. However, after the introduction of the tourist visa that allows tourists to spend up to 90 days in the country, rules related to public decency were formally approved to ensure that visitors and tourists in Saudi Arabia are aware of public decency.

== Rules ==
The new rules were approved by the Saudi's Minister of Interior which identify 19 offenses including littering, taking photographs and videos of people without permission, immodest dress and queue jumping.

=== Public behavior ===
Public behavior that is not consistent with local culture should be avoided, such as public displays of affection and using profane language or gestures.

=== Dress ===
Men and women are required to wear a modest dress that is not tight or fitting.

=== Religion ===
The rules state that during prayer time, music is turned off in public places. Moreover, during this time shops are closed for a short time. The rulers also state that in Ramadan where Muslims fast from dawn to dusk, it is respectful to avoid eating or drinking in public during the day at this time.

=== Alcohol and substances ===
It is illegal to sell, purchase, or consume alcohol in Saudi Arabia. Bringing alcohol or drugs into the country is also prohibited.
