= List of American films of 1951 =

American films released in 1951

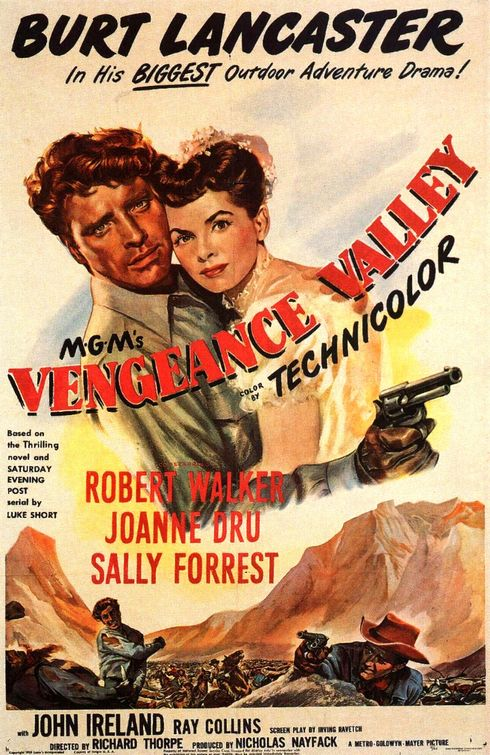
Vengeance Valley starring Burt Lancaster

More than 390 American feature films were released in 1951.

Danny Kaye hosted the 24th Academy Awards ceremony on held at the RKO Pantages Theatre in Hollywood. The winner of the Best Motion Picture category was Metro-Goldwyn-Mayer's An American in Paris.

The other four nominated pictures were Decision Before Dawn, A Place in the Sun, Quo Vadis, and A Streetcar Named Desire.

Vivien Leigh won the Oscar for Best Actress for her role as Blanche DuBois in A Streetcar Named Desire. Leigh had also played Blanche in the London stage production that had been directed by her then-husband Laurence Olivier. Other Best Actress nominees that year were Katharine Hepburn for The African Queen (Hepburn's 5th Best Actress Nomination), Eleanor Parker for Detective Story, Shelley Winters for A Place in the Sun, and Jane Wyman for The Blue Veil.

Humphrey Bogart won his only Oscar for his portrayal of Charlie Allnut in The African Queen. Other Best Actor nominees for that year were Marlon Brando for A Streetcar Named Desire, Montgomery Clift for A Place in the Sun, Arthur Kennedy for Bright Victory, and Fredric March for Death of a Salesman.

The 9th Golden Globe Awards also honored the best films of 1951. That year's Golden Globes also marked the first time that the Best Picture category was split into Musical or Comedy, or Drama. A Place in the Sun won Best Motion Picture - Drama, while An American in Paris won Best Motion Picture - Musical or Comedy. Fredric March won Best Actor, Drama, for Death of a Salesman, while Danny Kaye won Best Actor, Musical or Comedy, for On the Riviera. Jane Wyman won Best Actress, Drama, for her role in The Blue Veil, while June Allyson won Best Actress, Musical or Comedy, for Too Young to Kiss.

1951 also saw the film debut of Grace Kelly and Carroll Baker.

== A ==
Title	Director	Cast	Genre	Notes
The 13th Letter	Otto Preminger	Linda Darnell, Charles Boyer, Constance Smith	Film noir	20th Century Fox
Abbott and Costello Meet the Invisible Man	Charles Lamont	Bud Abbott, Lou Costello, Adele Jergens	Comedy–Horror	Universal
Abilene Trail	Lewis D. Collins	Whip Wilson, Noel Neill, Andy Clyde	Western	Monogram
According to Mrs. Hoyle	Jean Yarbrough	Spring Byington, Anthony Caruso, Tanis Chandler	Comedy crime	Monogram
Ace in the Hole	Billy Wilder	Kirk Douglas, Jan Sterling, Robert Arthur	Drama	Paramount
Across the Wide Missouri	William A. Wellman	Clark Gable, Ricardo Montalbán, Adolphe Menjou	Western	MGM
Adventures of Captain Fabian	William Marshall	Errol Flynn, Micheline Presle, Vincent Price	Adventure	Republic. Co-production with France
The African Queen	John Huston	Humphrey Bogart, Katharine Hepburn, Robert Morley	Adventure	Academy Award for Bogart
Air Cadet	Joseph Pevney	Gail Russell, Stephen McNally, Alex Nicol	Drama	Universal
Al Jennings of Oklahoma	Ray Nazarro	Dan Duryea, Gale Storm, Gloria Henry	Western	Columbia
Alice in Wonderland	Clyde Geronimi	Kathryn Beaumont, Ed Wynn, Sterling Holloway	Animation	Walt Disney
Along the Great Divide	Raoul Walsh	Kirk Douglas, Virginia Mayo, Walter Brennan	Western	Warner Bros.
An American in Paris	Vincente Minnelli	Leslie Caron, Gene Kelly, Oscar Levant	Musical	MGM. Academy Award for Best Picture
Angels in the Outfield	Clarence Brown	Paul Douglas, Janet Leigh Keenan Wynn	Sports, Comedy	MGM
Anne of the Indies	Jacques Tourneur	Louis Jourdan, Jean Peters, Debra Paget	Adventure	20th Century Fox
Apache Drums	Hugo Fregonese	Stephen McNally, Coleen Gray, Arthur Shields	Western	Universal
Appointment with Danger	Lewis Allen	Alan Ladd, Phyllis Calvert, Jan Sterling	Film Noir	Paramount
Arizona Manhunt	Fred C. Brannon	Michael Chapin, Eilene Janssen, Lucille Barkley	Western	Republic
As Young as You Feel	Harmon Jones	Constance Bennett, Monty Woolley, Jean Peters	Comedy	20th Century Fox. Cameo by Marilyn Monroe
As You Were	Bernard Girard	William Tracy, Joe Sawyer, Sondra Rodgers	Comedy	Lippert Pictures

== B ==
Title	Director	Cast	Genre	Notes
Badman's Gold	Robert Emmett Tansey	Johnny Carpenter, Kenne Duncan, Emmett Lynn	Western	Eagle-Lion
Bannerline	Don Weis	Keefe Brasselle, Sally Forrest, Lionel Barrymore	Drama	MGM
The Barefoot Mailman	Earl McEvoy	Robert Cummings, Terry Moore, Jerome Courtland	Comedy	Columbia
The Basketball Fix	Felix E. Feist	John Ireland, Marshall Thompson, Vanessa Brown	Drama	Realart
Bedtime for Bonzo	Frederick de Cordova	Ronald Reagan, Diana Lynn, Walter Slezak	Comedy	Universal
Behave Yourself!	George Beck	Farley Granger, Shelley Winters, Francis L. Sullivan	Comedy	RKO
Belle Le Grand	Allan Dwan	Vera Ralston, John Carroll, Grant Withers	Western	Republic
Best of the Badmen	William D. Russell	Robert Ryan, Claire Trevor, Robert Preston	Western	RKO
The Big Gusher	Lew Landers	Wayne Morris, Preston Foster, Dorothy Patrick	Adventure	Columbia
The Big Night	Joseph Losey	John Drew Barrymore, Joan Lorring, Preston Foster	Film noir	United Artists
Bird of Paradise	Delmer Daves	Debra Paget, Louis Jourdan, Jeff Chandler	Drama	20th Century Fox
Blazing Bullets	Wallace Fox	Johnny Mack Brown, Lois Hall, Stanley Price	Western	Monogram
Blue Blood	Lew Landers	Bill Williams, Jane Nigh, Audrey Long	Sports	Monogram
The Blue Veil	Joseph Losey	Jane Wyman, Charles Laughton, Joan Blondell	Drama	RKO
Bonanza Town	Fred F. Sears	Charles Starrett, Myron Healey, Fred F. Sears	Western	Columbia
Bowery Battalion	William Beaudine	Leo Gorcey, Huntz Hall, Donald MacBride	Comedy	Monogram
The Brave Bulls	Robert Rossen	Mel Ferrer, Anthony Quinn, Miroslava Stern	Drama	Columbia. Based on the 1949 novel
Bride of the Gorilla	Curt Siodmak	Raymond Burr, Lon Chaney Jr., Barbara Payton	Horror	Independent
Bright Victory	Mark Robson	Arthur Kennedy, Peggy Dow, Julie Adams	Drama	Universal. Based on Lights Out by Baynard Kendrick
Buckaroo Sheriff of Texas	Philip Ford	Michael Chapin, Eilene Janssen, Hugh O'Brian	Western	Republic
Bullfighter and the Lady	Budd Boetticher	Robert Stack, Joy Page, Gilbert Roland	Drama	Republic

== C-D ==
Title	Director	Cast	Genre	Notes
Callaway Went Thataway	Melvin Frank, Norman Panama	Fred MacMurray, Dorothy McGuire, Howard Keel	Comedy	MGM
Call Me Mister	Lloyd Bacon	Betty Grable, Dan Dailey, Danny Thomas	Musical	20th Century Fox. Based on the Broadway show
Canyon Raiders	Lewis D. Collins	Whip Wilson, Phyllis Coates, Fuzzy Knight	Western	Monogram
Casa Manana	Jean Yarbrough	Virginia Welles, Robert Clarke, Robert Karnes	Musical	Monogram
Cattle Drive	Kurt Neumann	Joel McCrea, Dean Stockwell, Leon Ames	Western	Universal
Cattle Queen	Robert Emmett Tansey	Maria Hart, William Fawcett, Johnny Carpenter	Western	Eagle-Lion
Cause for Alarm!	Tay Garnett	Loretta Young, Barry Sullivan, Bruce Cowling	Film noir	MGM
Cavalry Scout	Lesley Selander	Rod Cameron, Audrey Long, Jim Davis	Western	Monogram
Cave of Outlaws	William Castle	Macdonald Carey, Alexis Smith, Edgar Buchanan	Western	Universal
Chain of Circumstance	Will Jason	Margaret Field, Connie Gilchrist, Lawrence Dobkin	Drama	Columbia
Chained for Life	Harry L. Fraser	Hilton Twins, Allen Jenkins, Patricia Wright	Crime	Independent
Chicago Calling	John Reinhardt	Dan Duryea, Mary Anderson, Ross Elliott	Film noir	United Artists
China Corsair	Ray Nazarro	Jon Hall, Lisa Ferraday, Ron Randell	Adventure	Columbia
Close to My Heart	William Keighley	Gene Tierney, Ray Milland, Mary Beth Hughes	Drama	Warner Bros.
Colorado Ambush	Lewis D. Collins	Johnny Mack Brown, Lois Hall, Myron Healey	Western	Monogram
Come Fill the Cup	Gordon Douglas	James Cagney, Gig Young, Phyllis Thaxter	Drama	Warner Bros. Oscar nomination for Young
Comin' Round the Mountain	Charles Lamont	Abbott and Costello, Dorothy Shay, Kirby Grant	Comedy	Universal
The Company She Keeps	John Cromwell	Lizabeth Scott, Jane Greer, Dennis O'Keefe	Drama	RKO
Corky of Gasoline Alley	Edward Bernds	Scotty Beckett, Jimmy Lydon, Susan Morrow	Comedy	Columbia
Crazy Over Horses	William Beaudine	Bowery Boys, Gloria Saunders, Allen Jenkins	Comedy	Monogram
Criminal Lawyer	Seymour Friedman	Pat O'Brien, Jane Wyatt, Mary Castle	Film noir	Columbia
Crosswinds	Lewis R. Foster	Rhonda Fleming, John Payne, Forrest Tucker	Adventure	Paramount
Cry Danger	Robert Parrish	Dick Powell, Rhonda Fleming, William Conrad	Film noir	RKO
Cuban Fireball	William Beaudine	Estelita Rodriguez, Warren Douglas, Leon Belasco	Musical	Republic
Cyclone Fury	Ray Nazarro	Charles Starrett, Clayton Moore, Smiley Burnette	Western	Columbia
The Dakota Kid	Philip Ford	Michael Chapin, Eilene Janssen, Margaret Field	Western	Republic
Danger Zone	William Berke	Hugh Beaumont, Edward Brophy, Pamela Blake	Film noir	Lippert
Darling, How Could You!	Mitchell Leisen	Joan Fontaine, John Lund, Mona Freeman	Comedy	Paramount. Based on a play by James Barrie
David and Bathsheba	Henry King	Gregory Peck, Susan Hayward, Kieron Moore	Historical	20th Century Fox. From 2nd Old Testament book of Samuel
The Day the Earth Stood Still	Robert Wise	Michael Rennie, Patricia Neal, Hugh Marlowe	Science Fiction	20th Century Fox. Remade in 2008
Dear Brat	William A. Seiter	Mona Freeman, Billy De Wolfe, Edward Arnold	Comedy	Paramount
Death of a Salesman	László Benedek	Fredric March, Mildred Dunnock, Cameron Mitchell	Drama	Columbia. Based on Arthur Miller play
Decision Before Dawn	Anatole Litvak	Richard Basehart, Gary Merrill, Hildegard Knef	War	20th Century Fox. From the novel Call It Treason
The Desert Fox	Henry Hathaway	James Mason, Cedric Hardwicke, Jessica Tandy	Biographical	20th Century Fox. Based on the book Rommel
Desert of Lost Men	Harry Keller	Allan Lane, Mary Ellen Kay, Roy Barcroft	Western	Republic
Detective Story	William Wyler	Kirk Douglas, William Bendix, Eleanor Parker	Film noir	Paramount
Dick Turpin's Ride	Ralph Murphy	Louis Hayward, Patricia Medina, Suzanne Dalbert	Adventure	
Disc Jockey	Will Jason	Ginny Simms, Tom Drake, Jane Nigh	Musical	Allied Artists
Distant Drums	Raoul Walsh	Gary Cooper, Richard Webb, Mari Aldon	Western	Warner Bros.
Double Crossbones	Charles Barton	Donald O'Connor, Helena Carter, John Emery	Adventure	Universal
Double Dynamite	Irving Cummings	Frank Sinatra, Jane Russell, Groucho Marx	Musical Comedy	RKO
Drums in the Deep South	William Cameron Menzies	James Craig, Barbara Payton, Guy Madison	Western	RKO

== E-H ==
Title	Director	Cast	Genre	Notes
Elephant Stampede	Ford Beebe	Johnny Sheffield, Donna Martell, Myron Healey	Adventure	Monogram
Elopement	Henry Koster	Clifton Webb, William Lundigan, Anne Francis	Comedy	20th Century Fox
The Enforcer	Bretaigne Windust	Humphrey Bogart, Zero Mostel, Ted de Corsia	Film noir	Warner Bros.
Excuse My Dust	Roy Rowland	Red Skelton, Sally Forrest, Macdonald Carey	Comedy	MGM
FBI Girl	William A. Berke	Cesar Romero, George Brent, Audrey Totter	Film noir	Lippert
The Family Secret	Henry Levin	John Derek, Lee J. Cobb, Jody Lawrance	Drama	Columbia
Father's Little Dividend	Vincente Minnelli	Spencer Tracy, Joan Bennett, Elizabeth Taylor	Comedy	MGM. Sequel to Father of the Bride
Father Takes the Air	Frank McDonald	Raymond Walburn, Walter Catlett, Barbara Brown	Comedy	Monogram
The Fat Man	William Castle	Julie London, Rock Hudson, J. Scott Smart	Film noir	Universal
Fighting Coast Guard	Joseph Kane	Brian Donlevy, Forrest Tucker, Ella Raines	Action	Republic
Fingerprints Don't Lie	Sam Newfield	Richard Travis, Sheila Ryan, Margia Dean	Crime	Lippert
The First Legion	Douglas Sirk	Charles Boyer, Barbara Rush, William Demarest	Drama	United Artists
Five	Arch Oboler	Susan Douglas Rubeš, William Phipps, James Anderson	Drama	Columbia
Fixed Bayonets!	Samuel Fuller	Richard Basehart, Gene Evans, Michael O'Shea	War	20th Century Fox
Flame of Araby	Charles Lamont	Maureen O'Hara, Jeff Chandler, Maxwell Reed	Adventure	Universal
Flame of Stamboul	Ray Nazarro	Richard Denning, Lisa Ferraday, Nestor Paiva	Thriller	Columbia
Flight to Mars	Lesley Selander	Marguerite Chapman, Cameron Mitchell, Virginia Huston	Science Fiction	Monogram
Flying Leathernecks	Nicholas Ray	John Wayne, Robert Ryan, Janis Carter	War	RKO
Follow the Sun	Sidney Lanfield	Anne Baxter, Glenn Ford, June Havoc	Biographical	20th Century Fox
Force of Arms	Michael Curtiz	William Holden, Nancy Olson, Frank Lovejoy	War	Warner Bros.
Fort Defiance	John Rawlins	Dane Clark, Ben Johnson, Peter Graves	Western	United Artists
Fort Dodge Stampede	Harry Keller	Allan Lane, Mary Ellen Kay, Roy Barcroft	Western	Republic
Fort Savage Raiders	Ray Nazarro	Charles Starrett, Smiley Burnette, John Dehner	Western	Columbia
Fort Worth	Edwin L. Marin	Randolph Scott, David Brian, Phyllis Thaxter	Western	Warner Bros.
Fourteen Hours	Henry Hathaway	Paul Douglas, Richard Basehart, Debra Paget	Drama	20th Century Fox. Based on a story by Joel Sayre
Francis Goes to the Races	Arthur Lubin	Donald O'Connor, Piper Laurie, Cecil Kellaway	Comedy	Universal; sequel to 1950 film
The Frogmen	Lloyd Bacon	Richard Widmark, Dana Andrews, Gary Merrill	War	20th Century Fox. First film about scuba diving
Fury of the Congo	William Berke	Johnny Weissmuller, Lyle Talbot, William Henry	Adventure	Columbia
Gambling House	Ted Tetzlaff	Victor Mature, Terry Moore, William Bendix	Film noir	RKO
Gasoline Alley	Edward Bernds	Scotty Beckett, Jimmy Lydon, Susan Morrow	Comedy	Columbia
Gene Autry and the Mounties	John English	Gene Autry, Elena Verdugo, Carleton Young	Western	Columbia
Ghost Chasers	William Beaudine	Leo Gorcey, Huntz Hall, Lloyd Corrigan	Comedy	Monogram
G.I. Jane	Reginald LeBorg	Jean Porter, Tom Neal, Iris Adrian	Musical	Lippert
The Girl on the Bridge	Hugo Haas	Hugo Haas, Beverly Michaels, Judy Clark	Drama	20th Century Fox
Go for Broke!	Robert Pirosh	Van Johnson, Lane Nakano, Warner Anderson	War	MGM
Gold Raiders	Edward Bernds	George O'Brien, Sheila Ryan, Lyle Talbot	Western comedy	United Artists
Golden Girl	Lloyd Bacon	Mitzi Gaynor, Dale Robertson, Una Merkel	Musical western	20th Century Fox
The Golden Horde	George Sherman	Ann Blyth, David Farrar, George Macready	Adventure	Universal
Goodbye, My Fancy	Vincent Sherman	Joan Crawford, Robert Young, Frank Lovejoy	Romantic comedy	Warner Bros. Based on 1948 play
The Great Caruso	Richard Thorpe	Mario Lanza, Ann Blyth, Dorothy Kirsten	Biographical	MGM. Based on life of Enrico Caruso
The Great Missouri Raid	Gordon Douglas	Wendell Corey, Macdonald Carey, Ellen Drew	Western	Paramount
The Groom Wore Spurs	Richard Whorf	Ginger Rogers, Jack Carson, Joan Davis	Comedy	Universal
Grounds for Marriage	Robert Z. Leonard	Van Johnson, Kathryn Grayson, Paula Raymond	Romantic comedy	MGM
Gunplay	Lesley Selander	Tim Holt, Joan Dixon, Mauritz Hugo	Western	RKO
The Guy Who Came Back	Joseph M. Newman	Paul Douglas, Joan Bennett, Linda Darnell	Drama	20th Century Fox
Half Angel	Richard Sale	Loretta Young, Joseph Cotten, Cecil Kellaway	Comedy	20th Century Fox
Halls of Montezuma	Lewis Milestone	Richard Widmark, Jack Palance, Robert Wagner	War	20th Century Fox
Hard, Fast and Beautiful	Ida Lupino	Claire Trevor, Sally Forrest, Carleton G. Young	Sports drama	RKO
The Harlem Globetrotters	Phil Brown	Thomas Gomez, Dorothy Dandridge, Duke Cumberland	Sports	Columbia
Havana Rose	William Beaudine	Estelita Rodriguez, Bill Williams, Hugh Herbert	Musical comedy	Republic
He Ran All the Way	John Berry	John Garfield, Shelley Winters, Wallace Ford	Film noir	United Artists
Heart of the Rockies	William Witney	Roy Rogers, Penny Edwards, Gordon Jones	Western	Republic
Her First Romance	Seymour Friedman	Margaret O'Brien, Ann Doran, Lloyd Corrigan	Drama	Columbia
Here Comes the Groom	Frank Capra	Bing Crosby, Jane Wyman, Alexis Smith	Musical	Paramount
The Highwayman	Lesley Selander	Philip Friend, Wanda Hendrix, Cecil Kellaway	Drama	Monogram. Based on Alfred Noyes poem
The Hills of Utah	John English	Gene Autry, Elaine Riley, Donna Martell	Western	Columbia
His Kind of Woman	John Farrow, Richard Fleischer	Robert Mitchum, Jane Russell, Vincent Price	Film noir	RKO. Howard Hughes production
Hollywood Story	William Castle	Julie Adams, Richard Conte, Richard Egan	Crime drama	Universal
Home Town Story	Arthur Pierson	Jeffrey Lynn, Marjorie Reynolds, Donald Crisp	Drama	MGM.
Honeychile	R.G. Springsteen	Judy Canova, Eddie Foy Jr., Claire Carleton	Comedy	Republic
Hong Kong	Lewis R. Foster	Ronald Reagan, Rhonda Fleming, Nigel Bruce	Adventure	Paramount
The Hoodlum	Max Nosseck	Lawrence Tierney, Allene Roberts, Marjorie Riordan	Crime drama	Eagle-Lion
Hot Lead	Stuart Gilmore	Tim Holt, Joan Dixon, Richard Martin	Western	RKO
The House on Telegraph Hill	Robert Wise	Richard Basehart, Valentina Cortese, William Lundigan	Film noir	20th Century Fox
Hunt the Man Down	George Archainbaud	Gig Young, Lynne Roberts, Mary Anderson	Drama	RKO
Hurricane Island	Lew Landers	Jon Hall, Marie Windsor, Edgar Barrier	Adventure	Columbia

== I-M ==
Title	Director	Cast	Genre	Notes
I Can Get It for You Wholesale	Michael Gordon	Susan Hayward, Dan Dailey, George Sanders	Romance	20th Century Fox. Based on a play by Jerome Weidman
I'd Climb the Highest Mountain	Henry King	William Lundigan, Susan Hayward, Rory Calhoun	Drama	20th Century Fox
I Want You	Mark Robson	Dana Andrews, Dorothy McGuire, Farley Granger	Romance	RKO
I Was an American Spy	Lesley Selander	Ann Dvorak, Gene Evans, Douglas Kennedy	Drama	Allied Artists
I Was a Communist for the FBI	Gordon Douglas	Frank Lovejoy, Dorothy Hart, Philip Carey	Film noir	Warner Bros.
I'll See You in My Dreams	Michael Curtiz	Doris Day, Danny Thomas, Frank Lovejoy	Biographical	Warner Bros. Based on life of Gus Kahn
In Old Amarillo	William Witney	Roy Rogers, Estelita Rodriguez, Penny Edwards	Western	Republic
Inside Straight	Gerald Mayer	David Brian, Mercedes McCambridge, Arlene Dahl	Drama	MGM
Inside the Walls of Folsom Prison	Crane Wilbur	Steve Cochran, David Brian, Philip Carey	Drama	Warner Bros.
Insurance Investigator	George Blair	Richard Denning, Audrey Long, Hillary Brooke	Crime	Republic
Iron Man	Joseph Pevney	Jeff Chandler, Evelyn Keyes, Stephen McNally	Film noir	Universal; Remake of 1931 film
It's a Big Country	Clarence Brown; John Sturges; Charles Vidor; William Wellman	Gary Cooper, Gene Kelly, Fredric March, Ethel Barrymore, Janet Leigh, Nancy Davis	Drama	MGM, anthology film
Jim Thorpe – All-American	Michael Curtiz	Burt Lancaster, Charles Bickford, Phyllis Thaxter	Biographical	Warner Bros. Star of 1912 Olympic Games
Joe Palooka in Triple Cross	Reginald LeBorg	Joe Kirkwood, Cathy Downs, James Gleason	Comedy	Monogram
Journey into Light	Stuart Heisler	Sterling Hayden, Viveca Lindfors, Thomas Mitchell	Drama	20th Century Fox
Jungle Manhunt	Lew Landers	Johnny Weissmuller, Sheila Ryan, Lyle Talbot	Adventure	Columbia
Katie Did It	Frederick De Cordova	Ann Blyth, Mark Stevens, Cecil Kellaway	Comedy	Universal
Kentucky Jubilee	Ron Ormond	Jerry Colonna, Jean Porter, James Ellison	Musical	Lippert
The Kid from Amarillo	Ray Nazarro	Charles Starrett, Smiley Burnette, Harry Lauter	Western	Columbia
Kind Lady	John Sturges	Ethel Barrymore, Maurice Evans, Angela Lansbury	Drama	MGM. Remake of 1935 film
Korea Patrol	Max Nosseck	Richard Emory, Benson Fong, Sung Li	War	Lippert
The Lady from Texas	Joseph Pevney	Howard Duff, Mona Freeman, Josephine Hull	Comedy western	Universal
The Lady Pays Off	Douglas Sirk	Linda Darnell, Stephen McNally, Gigi Perreau	Drama	Universal
The Lady Says No	Frank Ross	David Niven, Joan Caulfield, James Robertson Justice	Comedy	United Artists
Law of the Badlands	Lesley Selander	Tim Holt, Joan Dixon, Richard Martin	Western	RKO
The Law and the Lady	Edwin H. Knopf	Greer Garson, Michael Wilding, Fernando Lamas	Comedy	MGM. Based on The Last of Mrs. Cheyney
Lawless Cowboys	Lewis D. Collins	Whip Wilson, Fuzzy Knight, Pamela Duncan	Western	Monogram
The Last Outpost	Lewis R. Foster	Ronald Reagan, Rhonda Fleming, Bruce Bennett	Western	Paramount; Remake of 1935 film
Leave It to the Marines	Sam Newfield	Sid Melton, Margia Dean, Sam Flint	Comedy	Lippert
The Lemon Drop Kid	Sidney Lanfield	Bob Hope, Marilyn Maxwell, William Frawley	Comedy	Paramount. Remake of 1934 film; Introduced the song "Silver Bells"
Let's Go Navy!	William Beaudine	Leo Gorcey, Huntz Hall, Allen Jenkins	Comedy	Monogram
Let's Make It Legal	Richard Sale	Claudette Colbert, Macdonald Carey, Zachary Scott, Marilyn Monroe	Comedy	20th Century Fox
The Light Touch	Richard Brooks	Stewart Granger, Pier Angeli, George Sanders	Crime	MGM
Lightning Strikes Twice	King Vidor	Ruth Roman, Richard Todd, Zachary Scott	Drama	Warner Bros.
The Lion Hunters	Ford Beebe	Johnny Sheffield, Douglas Kennedy, Ann Todd	Adventure	Monogram
Little Big Horn	Charles Marquis Warren	Lloyd Bridges, Marie Windsor, John Ireland	Western	Lippert Pictures
Little Egypt	Frederick de Cordova	Rhonda Fleming, Mark Stevens, Nancy Guild	Biography	Universal
The Longhorn	Lewis D. Collins	Bill Elliott, Myron Healey, Phyllis Coates	Western	Monogram
Lorna Doone	Phil Karlson	Barbara Hale, Richard Greene, William Bishop	Adventure	Columbia
Lost Continent	Sam Newfield	Cesar Romero, Hillary Brooke, John Hoyt	Sci-fi	Lippert
Love Nest	Joseph Newman	June Haver, William Lundigan, Marilyn Monroe	Drama	20th Century Fox
Lullaby of Broadway	David Butler	Doris Day, Gene Nelson, S.Z. Sakall	Musical	Warner Bros.
M	Joseph Losey	David Wayne, Howard Da Silva, Luther Adler	Film noir	Columbia; Remake of 1931 film
Ma and Pa Kettle Back on the Farm	Edward Sedgwick	Marjorie Main, Percy Kilbride, Meg Randall	Comedy	Universal. 3rd of a series
The Magic Carpet	Lew Landers	Lucille Ball, John Agar, Patricia Medina	Adventure	Columbia
The Magic Face	Frank Tuttle	Luther Adler, Patricia Knight, Jaspar von Oertzen	War drama	Columbia
The Man from Planet X	Edgar G. Ulmer	Robert Clarke, Margaret Field, William Schallert	Sci-fi	United Artists
Man from Sonora	Lewis D. Collins	Johnny Mack Brown, Phyllis Coates, Lyle Talbot	Western	Monogram
Man in the Saddle	Andre DeToth	Randolph Scott, Joan Leslie, Ellen Drew	Western	Columbia
The Man with My Face	Edward Montagne	Barry Nelson, Carole Mathews, John Harvey	Film noir	United Artists.
The Man with a Cloak	Fletcher Markle	Joseph Cotten, Barbara Stanwyck, Louis Calhern	Drama	MGM. Based on the short story The Gentleman from Paris
Mark of the Renegade	Hugo Fregonese	Ricardo Montalbán, Cyd Charisse, Gilbert Roland	Adventure	Universal
Mask of the Avenger	Phil Karlson	John Derek, Anthony Quinn, Jody Lawrance	Adventure	Columbia
Mask of the Dragon	Sam Newfield	Richard Travis, Sheila Ryan, Lyle Talbot	Crime	Lippert
The Mating Season	Mitchell Leisen	Gene Tierney, John Lund, Miriam Hopkins	Comedy	Paramount
Meet Me After the Show	Richard Sale	Betty Grable, Rory Calhoun, Macdonald Carey	Musical	20th Century Fox
Million Dollar Pursuit	R. G. Springsteen	Penny Edwards, Grant Withers, Rhys Williams	Crime	Republic
A Millionaire for Christy	George Marshall	Eleanor Parker, Fred MacMurray, Richard Carlson	Comedy	20th Century Fox
Missing Women	Philip Ford	Penny Edwards, John Alvin, John Gallaudet	Crime	Republic
The Mob	Robert Parrish	Broderick Crawford, Betty Buehler, Richard Kiley	Film noir	Columbia
The Model and the Marriage Broker	George Cukor	Jeanne Crain, Scott Brady, Thelma Ritter	Comedy	20th Century Fox
Montana Desperado	Wallace Fox	Johnny Mack Brown, Myron Healey, Virginia Herrick	Western	Monogram
Mr. Belvedere Rings the Bell	Henry Koster	Clifton Webb, Joanne Dru, Zero Mostel	Comedy	20th Century Fox
Mr. Imperium	Don Hartman	Lana Turner, Ezio Pinza, Marjorie Main	Romance	MGM
Mister Universe	Joseph Lerner	Jack Carson, Janis Paige, Vince Edwards	Comedy	Eagle-Lion
My Favorite Spy	Norman Z. McLeod	Bob Hope, Hedy Lamarr, Francis L. Sullivan	Comedy	Paramount
My Forbidden Past	Robert Stevenson	Ava Gardner, Robert Mitchum, Melvyn Douglas	Drama	RKO
My Outlaw Brother	Elliott Nugent	Mickey Rooney, Wanda Hendrix, Robert Preston	Western	Eagle-Lion
My True Story	Mickey Rooney	Helen Walker, Willard Parker, Elisabeth Risdon	Film noir	Columbia

== N-R ==
Title	Director	Cast	Genre	Notes
Navy Bound	Paul Landres	Tom Neal, Regis Toomey, John Abbott	Drama	Monogram
Nevada Badmen	Lewis D. Collins	Whip Wilson, Phyllis Coates, Fuzzy Knight	Western	Monogram
Never Trust a Gambler	Ralph Murphy	Dane Clark, Cathy O'Donnell, Tom Drake	Film noir	Columbia
New Mexico	Irving Reis	Lew Ayres, Marilyn Maxwell, Andy Devine	Western	United Artists
Night into Morning	Fletcher Markle	Ray Milland, Nancy Davis, John Hodiak	Drama	MGM
Night Riders of Montana	Fred C. Brannon	Allan Lane, Claudia Barrett, Roy Barcroft	Western	Republic
No Questions Asked	Harold F. Kress	Arlene Dahl, Barry Sullivan, Jean Hagen	Crime	MGM
Northwest Territory	Frank McDonald	Kirby Grant, Gloria Saunders, Warren Douglas	Western	Monogram
Oh! Susanna	Joseph Kane	Lorna Gray, Rod Cameron, Forrest Tucker	Western	Republic
Oklahoma Justice	Lewis D. Collins	Johnny Mack Brown, Phyllis Coates	Western	Monogram
On Dangerous Ground	Nicholas Ray	Ida Lupino, Robert Ryan, Ward Bond	Film noir	RKO
On the Loose	Charles Lederer	Joan Evans, Melvyn Douglas, Lynn Bari	Drama	RKO
On Moonlight Bay	Roy Del Ruth	Doris Day, Gordon MacRae, Leon Ames	Musical	Warner Bros.; followed by By the Light of the Silvery Moon
On the Riviera	Walter Lang	Danny Kaye, Gene Tierney, Corinne Calvet	Musical	20th Century Fox. Based on the play The Red Cat
Only the Valiant	Gordon Douglas	Gregory Peck, Barbara Payton, Ward Bond	Western	Warner Bros.
Operation Pacific	George Waggner	John Wayne, Patricia Neal, Scott Forbes	War	Warner Bros.
Overland Telegraph	Lesley Selander	Tim Holt, Gail Davis, Mari Blanchard	Western	RKO
The Painted Hills	Harold F. Kress	Bruce Cowling, Ann Doran, Paul Kelly	Family	MGM
Painting the Clouds with Sunshine	David Butler	Dennis Morgan, Virginia Mayo, Gene Nelson	Musical	Warner Bros. Remake of Gold Diggers of 1933
Pals of the Golden West	William Witney	Roy Rogers, Dale Evans, Estelita Rodriguez	Western	Republic
Pardon My French	Bernard Vorhaus	Paul Henreid, Merle Oberon, Jim Gérald	Comedy	United Artists. Co-production with France
Passage West	Lewis R. Foster	John Payne, Arleen Whelan, Dennis O'Keefe	Western	Paramount
Payment on Demand	Curtis Bernhardt	Bette Davis, Barry Sullivan, Kent Taylor	Drama	RKO. Originally titled The Story of a Divorce
Pecos River	Fred F. Sears	Charles Starrett, Jock Mahoney, Steve Darrell	Western	Columbia
Peking Express	William Dieterle	Joseph Cotten, Corinne Calvet, Edmund Gwenn	Thriller	Paramount. Second remake of Shanghai Express
The People Against O'Hara	John Sturges	Spencer Tracy, Pat O'Brien, Diana Lynn	Film noir	MGM
People Will Talk	Joseph L. Mankiewicz	Cary Grant, Jeanne Crain, Hume Cronyn	Romantic comedy	20th Century Fox. Based on a play by Curt Goetz
Pickup	Hugo Haas	Hugo Haas, Beverly Michaels, Allan Nixon	Film noir	Columbia
Pier 23	William Berke	Hugh Beaumont, Ann Savage, Margia Dean	Crime comedy	Lippert
Pistol Harvest	Lesley Selander	Tim Holt, Joan Dixon, Richard Martin	Western	RKO
A Place in the Sun	George Stevens	Elizabeth Taylor, Montgomery Clift, Shelley Winters,	Drama	Paramount. Based on a book by Theodore Dreiser; won 6 Academy Awards
Prairie Roundup	Fred F. Sears	Charles Starrett, Mary Castle, Frank Fenton	Western	Columbia
Pride of Maryland	Philip Ford	Peggy Stewart, Stanley Clements, Frankie Darro	Drama	Republic
The Prince Who Was a Thief	Rudolph Maté	Tony Curtis, Piper Laurie, Peggie Castle	Adventure	Universal
The Prowler	Joseph Losey	Van Heflin, Evelyn Keyes, Katherine Warren	Film noir	United Artists
Purple Heart Diary	Richard Quine	Frances Langford, Judd Holdren, Aline Towne	Drama	Columbia
Quebec	George Templeton	John Drew Barrymore, Corinne Calvet, Patric Knowles	Historical drama	Paramount
Quo Vadis	Mervyn LeRoy	Robert Taylor, Deborah Kerr, Peter Ustinov,	Historical epic	MGM; based on the novel; 8 Oscar nominations; Golden Globe won by Ustinov
Queen for a Day	Arthur Lubin	Jack Bailey, Phyllis Avery, Helen Mowery	Comedy	United Artists
The Racket	John Cromwell	Robert Mitchum, Robert Ryan, Lizabeth Scott,	Film noir	RKO. Remake of the 1928 film
The Raging Tide	George Sherman	Shelley Winters, Richard Conte, Stephen McNally	Film noir	Universal
Raton Pass	Edwin L. Marin	Patricia Neal, Dennis Morgan, Scott Forbes	Western	Warner Bros.
Rawhide	Henry Hathaway	Tyrone Power, Susan Hayward, Hugh Marlowe	Western	20th Century Fox; Became TV series
The Red Badge of Courage	John Huston	Audie Murphy, Bill Mauldin, Douglas Dick	War	MGM. Based on Stephen Crane novel
The Redhead and the Cowboy	Leslie Fenton	Rhonda Fleming, Glenn Ford, Edmond O'Brien	Western	Paramount
Red Mountain	William Dieterle	Alan Ladd, Lizabeth Scott, Arthur Kennedy	Western	Paramount
Reunion in Reno	Kurt Neumann	Mark Stevens, Peggy Dow, Gigi Perreau	Drama	Universal
Rhubarb	Arthur Lubin	Ray Milland, Jan Sterling, Gene Lockhart	Comedy	Paramount. Based on H. Allen Smith book
Rhythm Inn	Paul Landres	Jane Frazee, Kirby Grant, Lois Collier	Musical	Monogram
Rich, Young and Pretty	Norman Taurog	Jane Powell, Wendell Corey, Danielle Darrieux	Musical	MGM
Ridin' the Outlaw Trail	Fred F. Sears	Charles Starrett, Jim Bannon, Edgar Dearing	Western	Columbia
The River	Jean Renoir	Nora Swinburne, Esmond Knight, Arthur Shields	Romance	United Artists
Roadblock	Harold Daniels	Charles McGraw, Joan Dixon, Lowell Gilmore	Film noir	RKO
Roaring City	William Berke	Hugh Beaumont, Wanda McKay, Joan Valerie	Crime	Lippert
Rodeo King and the Senorita	Philip Ford	Rex Allen, Mary Ellen Kay, Buddy Ebsen	Western	Republic
Rogue River	John Rawlins	Rory Calhoun, Peter Graves, Frank Fenton	Western	Eagle-Lion
Rough Riders of Durango	Fred C. Brannon	Allan Lane, Aline Towne, Steve Darrell	Western	Republic
Royal Wedding	Stanley Donen	Fred Astaire, Jane Powell, Peter Lawford	Musical	MGM. Donen's first solo film

== S-Z ==
Title	Director	Cast	Genre	Notes
Saddle Legion	Lesley Selander	Tim Holt, Dorothy Malone, Richard Martin	Western	RKO
Santa Fe	Irving Pichel	Randolph Scott, Janis Carter, Jerome Courtland	Western	Columbia
Saturday's Hero	David Miller	John Derek, Donna Reed, Sidney Blackmer	Sports drama	Columbia
Savage Drums	William Berke	Sabu, Lita Baron, H. B. Warner	Adventure	Lippert
The Scarf	Ewald Andre Dupont	Mercedes McCambridge, John Ireland, Emlyn Williams	Drama	United Artists
The Sea Hornet	Joseph Kane	Rod Cameron, Adele Mara, Lorna Gray	Adventure	Republic
Sealed Cargo	Alfred L. Werker	Dana Andrews, Carla Balenda, Claude Rains	War	RKO
The Secret of Convict Lake	Michael Gordon	Glenn Ford, Gene Tierney, Zachary Scott	Western	20th Century Fox
Secrets of Monte Carlo	George Blair	Warren Douglas, Lois Hall, June Vincent	Crime	Republic
Show Boat	George Sidney	Howard Keel, Kathryn Grayson, Ava Gardner	Musical	MGM. Based on novel by Edna Ferber; remake of 1936 film
Silver Canyon	John English	Gene Autry, Gail Davis, Bob Steele	Western	Columbia
Silver City	Byron Haskin	Edmond O'Brien, Yvonne De Carlo, Barry Fitzgerald	Western	Paramount
Silver City Bonanza	George Blair	Rex Allen, Buddy Ebsen, Mary Ellen Kay	Western	Republic
Sirocco	Curtis Bernhardt	Humphrey Bogart, Märta Torén, Lee J. Cobb	Film noir	Columbia. Based on novel Coup de Grace
Skipalong Rosenbloom	Sam Newfield	Max Rosenbloom, Max Baer, Hillary Brooke	Western	United Artists
Sky High	Sam Newfield	Sid Melton, Margia Dean, Sam Flint	Comedy	Lippert
Slaughter Trail	Irving Allen	Gig Young, Brian Donlevy, Virginia Grey	Western	RKO
Smuggler's Gold	William Berke	Cameron Mitchell, Amanda Blake, William Forrest	Adventure	Columbia
Smuggler's Island	Edward Ludwig	Jeff Chandler, Evelyn Keyes, Philip Friend	Adventure	Universal
Snake River Desperadoes	Fred F. Sears	Charles Starrett, Monte Blue, Smiley Burnette	Western	Columbia
Soldiers Three	Tay Garnett	Stewart Granger, Walter Pidgeon, David Niven	Adventure	MGM
The Son of Dr. Jekyll	Seymour Friedman	Louis Hayward, Jody Lawrance, Alexander Knox	Horror	Columbia
South of Caliente	William Witney	Roy Rogers, Dale Evans, Douglas Fowley	Western	Republic
Spoilers of the Plains	William Witney	Roy Rogers, Penny Edwards, Gordon Jones	Western	Republic
St. Benny the Dip	Edgar G. Ulmer	Dick Haymes, Nina Foch, Roland Young	Comedy	United Artists
Stage to Blue River	Lewis D. Collins	Whip Wilson, Fuzzy Knight, Phyllis Coates	Western	Monogram
Stagecoach Driver	Lewis D. Collins	Whip Wilson, Fuzzy Knight, Gloria Winters	Western	Monogram
Starlift	Roy Del Ruth	Janice Rule, Dick Wesson, Ruth Roman	Musical	Warner Bros.
The Steel Helmet	Samuel Fuller	Gene Evans, Robert Hutton, Steve Brodie	War	Lippert
Stop That Cab	Eugenio de Liguoro	Sid Melton, Iris Adrian, Marjorie Lord	Comedy crime	Lippert
Storm Warning	Stuart Heisler	Ronald Reagan, Doris Day, Ginger Rogers	Thriller	Warner Bros.
The Strange Door	Joseph Pevney	Charles Laughton, Boris Karloff, Sally Forrest	Horror	Universal
Strangers on a Train	Alfred Hitchcock	Farley Granger, Ruth Roman, Robert Walker	Suspense	Warner Bros.; based on Patricia Highsmith novel
A Streetcar Named Desire	Elia Kazan	Vivien Leigh, Marlon Brando, Karl Malden	Drama	Warner Bros. written by Tennessee Williams; Oscars for Leigh, Malden, Hunter
Street Bandits	R. G. Springsteen	Penny Edwards, Robert Clarke, Roy Barcroft	Crime	Republic
Strictly Dishonorable	Melvin Frank	Ezio Pinza, Janet Leigh, Gale Robbins	Romantic comedy	MGM
The Strip	László Kardos	Mickey Rooney, Sally Forrest, James Craig	Musical	MGM
Stronghold	Steve Sekely	Veronica Lake, Zachary Scott, Rita Macedo	Historical	Lippert
Submarine Command	John Farrow	William Holden, Nancy Olson, William Bendix	War	Paramount
Sugarfoot	Edwin L. Marin	Randolph Scott, Adele Jergens, Raymond Massey	Western	Warner Bros.
Sunny Side of the Street	Richard Quine	Frankie Laine, Audrey Long, Terry Moore	Comedy	Columbia
Superman and the Mole Men	Lee Sholem	George Reeves, Phyllis Coates, Jeff Corey	Action	Lippert. Based on DC Comics character
The Sword of Monte Cristo	Maurice Geraghty	George Montgomery, Rita Corday, William Conrad	Adventure	20th Century Fox
Take Care of My Little Girl	Jean Negulesco	Jeanne Crain, Dale Robertson, Mitzi Gaynor	Drama	20th Century Fox
Tales of Robin Hood	James Tinling	Robert Clarke, Mary Hatcher, Paul Cavanagh	Adventure	Lippert
The Tall Target	Anthony Mann	Dick Powell, Paula Raymond, Adolphe Menjou	Film noir	MGM
The Tanks are Coming	D. Ross Lederman	Steve Cochran, Philip Carey, Mari Aldon	War	Warner Bros.
Target Unknown	George Sherman	Mark Stevens, Alex Nicol, Gig Young	War	Universal
Tarzan's Peril	Byron Haskin	Lex Barker, Virginia Huston, George Macready	Adventure	RKO; one of Tarzan series
Ten Tall Men	Willis Goldbeck	Burt Lancaster, Jody Lawrance, Gilbert Roland	Adventure	Columbia
Teresa	Fred Zinnemann	Pier Angeli, John Ericson, Peggy Ann Garner	Drama	MGM
Texans Never Cry	Frank McDonald	Gene Autry, Mary Castle, Russell Hayden	Western	Columbia
Texas Carnival	Charles Walters	Esther Williams, Red Skelton, Howard Keel, Ann Miller	Musical comedy	MGM
Texas Lawmen	Lewis D. Collins	Johnny Mack Brown, James Ellison, Lee Roberts	Western	Monogram
The Texas Rangers	Phil Karlson	George Montgomery, Gale Storm, Jerome Courtland	Western	Columbia; Remake of 1936 film
That's My Boy	Hal Walker	Dean Martin, Jerry Lewis, Ruth Hussey	Comedy	Paramount
The Thing from Another World	Howard Hawks	Kenneth Tobey, Margaret Sheridan, Dewey Martin	Science fiction	RKO. Remade in 1982 as The Thing
Three Desperate Men	Sam Newfield	Preston Foster, Jim Davis, Virginia Grey	Western	Lippert
Three Guys Named Mike	Charles Walters	Jane Wyman, Van Johnson, Howard Keel	Drama	MGM
Three Husbands	Irving Reis	Eve Arden, Ruth Warrick, Vanessa Brown	Comedy	United Artists
Three Steps North	W. Lee Wilder	Lloyd Bridges, Lea Padovani, Aldo Fabrizi	Crime	United Artists
Thunder in God's Country	George Blair	Rex Allen, Mary Ellen Kay, Buddy Ebsen	Western	Republic
Thunder on the Hill	Douglas Sirk	Claudette Colbert, Ann Blyth, Anne Crawford	Film noir	Universal
The Thundering Trail	Ron Ormond	Lash La Rue, Al St. John, Archie R. Twitchell	Western	Realart
Tokyo File 212	Dorrell McGowan	Florence Marly, Lee Frederick, Katsuhiko Haida	Espionage	RKO. First Hollywood film entirely filmed in Japan
Tomahawk	George Sherman	Van Heflin, Yvonne De Carlo, Alex Nicol	Western	Universal
Tomorrow Is Another Day	Felix Feist	Ruth Roman, Steve Cochran, Lurene Tuttle	Drama	Warner Bros.
Too Young to Kiss	Robert Z. Leonard	June Allyson, Van Johnson, Gig Young	Comedy	MGM. Golden Globe for Allyson
Two-Dollar Bettor	Edward L. Cahn	Steve Brodie, Marie Windsor, Walter Kingsford	Film noir	Realart
Two Gals and a Guy	Alfred E. Green	Janis Paige, Robert Alda, James Gleason	Comedy	United Artists
Two Lost Worlds	Norman Dawn	Kasey Rogers, James Arness, Bill Kennedy	Sci-fi	Eagle-Lion
Two of a Kind	Henry Levin	Edmond O'Brien, Lizabeth Scott, Terry Moore	Film noir	Columbia
Two Tickets to Broadway	James V. Kern	Tony Martin, Janet Leigh, Eddie Bracken	Musical	RKO
The Unknown Man	Richard Thorpe	Walter Pidgeon, Ann Harding, Barry Sullivan	Drama	MGM
Unknown World	Terry O. Morse	Marilyn Nash, Victor Kilian, Bruce Kellogg	Sci-fi	Lippert
Up Front	Alexander Hall	David Wayne, Tom Ewell, Marina Berti	Comedy	Universal
Utah Wagon Train	Philip Ford	Rex Allen, Penny Edwards, Roy Barcroft	Western	Republic
Valentino	Lewis Allen	Eleanor Parker, Anthony Dexter, Patricia Medina	Biographical	Columbia
Valley of Fire	John English	Gene Autry, Gail Davis, Russell Hayden	Western	Columbia
The Vanishing Outpost	Ron Ormond	Lash La Rue, Al St. John, Bud Osborne	Western	Independent
Varieties on Parade	Ron Ormond	Jackie Coogan, Tom Neal, Iris Adrian	Musical	Lippert
Vengeance Valley	Richard Thorpe	Burt Lancaster, Robert Walker, Joanne Dru	Western	MGM
Wanted: Dead or Alive	Thomas Carr	Whip Wilson, Christine McIntyre, Fuzzy Knight	Western	Monogram
Warpath	Byron Haskin	Edmond O'Brien, Dean Jagger, Forrest Tucker	Western	Paramount
Week-End with Father	Douglas Sirk	Van Heflin, Patricia Neal, Gigi Perreau	Comedy	Universal
The Well	Leo C. Popkin, Russell Rouse	Richard Rober, Harry Morgan, Maidie Norman	Drama	United Artists
Wells Fargo Gunmaster	Philip Ford	Allan Lane, Mary Ellen Kay, Roy Barcroft	Western	Republic
Westward the Women	William A. Wellman	Robert Taylor, Denise Darcel, John McIntire	Western	MGM
When I Grow Up	Michael Kanin	Robert Preston, Martha Scott, Bobby Driscoll	Drama	United Artists
When the Redskins Rode	Lew Landers	Jon Hall, Mary Castle, John Ridgely	Adventure	Columbia
When Worlds Collide	Rudolph Maté	Richard Derr, Barbara Rush, Peter Hansen	Sci-fi	Paramount
The Whip Hand	W.C. Menzies	Carla Balenda, Elliott Reid, Raymond Burr	Western	RKO
Whirlwind	John English	Gene Autry, Gail Davis, Thurston Hall	Western	Columbia
The Whistle at Eaton Falls	Robert Siodmak	Lloyd Bridges, Dorothy Gish, Carleton Carpenter	Drama	Columbia
Whistling Hills	Derwin Abrahams	Johnny Mack Brown, James Ellison, Noel Neill	Western	Monogram
The Wild Blue Yonder	Allan Dwan	Wendell Corey, Vera Ralston, Forrest Tucker	War drama	Republic
A Yank in Korea	Lew Landers	Lon McCallister, Brett King, William Tannen	War	Columbia
Yellow Fin	Frank McDonald	Wayne Morris, Lorna Gray, Gloria Henry	Adventure	Monogram
You Never Can Tell	Lou Breslow	Dick Powell, Peggy Dow, Joyce Holden	Comedy	Universal
You're in the Navy Now	Henry Hathaway	Gary Cooper, Jane Greer, Millard Mitchell	Comedy	20th Century Fox
Yukon Manhunt	Frank McDonald	Kirby Grant, Gail Davis, Margaret Field	Western	Monogram

== Documentaries ==
Title	Director	Cast	Genre	Notes
The Best Is Yet to Come	Kroger Babb	-	Exploitation	
The Big Lie			War	Cold War propaganda
Day of the Fight	Stanley Kubrick	Walter Cartier	Documentary	First picture directed by Kubrick
Flying Padre	Stanley Kubrick	Fred Stadmueller	Documentary	Kubrick's second film

== Serials ==
Title	Director	Cast	Genre	Notes
Captain Video: Master of the Stratosphere	Spencer Gordon Bennet	Judd Holdren	Serial	
Don Daredevil Rides Again	Fred C. Brannon	Ken Curtis, Aline Towne	Serial	
Government Agents vs Phantom Legion	Fred C. Brannon	Walter Reed, Mary Ellen Kay	Serial	12-chapter serial
Mysterious Island	Spencer Gordon Bennet	Richard Crane, Marshall Reed	Serial	Based on the Jules Verne novel

== Shorts ==
Title	Director	Cast	Genre	Notes
Baby Sitters Jitters	Jules White	The Three Stooges	Comedy	
Ballot Box Bunny	Friz Freleng	Looney Tunes	Animation	
A Bear For Punishment	Chuck Jones	Looney Tunes	Animation	
Big Top Bunny	Robert McKimson	Looney Tunes	Animation	
A Bone for a Bone	Friz Freleng	Looney Tunes	Animation	
Bunny Hugged	Chuck Jones	Looney Tunes	Animation	Remake of the short Rabbit Punch
Casanova Cat	Hanna-Barbera	Tom and Jerry	Animation	
Cat Napping	Hanna-Barbera	Tom and Jerry	Animation	
Cheese Chasers	Chuck Jones	Looney Tunes	Animation	
Chow Hound	Chuck Jones	Looney Tunes	Animation	
Cruise Cat	Hanna-Barbera	Tom and Jerry	Animation	
Destination Meatball	Walter Lantz	Woody Woodpecker	Animation	
Don't Throw That Knife	Jules White	The Three Stooges	Comedy	
Drip-Along Daffy	Chuck Jones	Looney Tunes	Animation	
Duck and Cover	Anthony Rizzo		Propaganda	
The Flying Cat	Hanna-Barbera	Tom and Jerry	Animation	
French Rarebit	Robert McKimson	Looney Tunes	Animation	
Gerald McBoing-Boing	Robert Cannon	Marvin Miller	Animation	Academy Award: Best Animated Short
His Mouse Friday	Hanna-Barbera	Tom and Jerry	Animation	
Hula-La-La	Edward Bernds	Three Stooges	Comedy	
Jerry and Jumbo	Hanna-Barbera	Tom and Jerry	Animation	
Jerry and the Goldfish	Hanna-Barbera	Tom and Jerry	Animation	
Just Ducky	Hanna-Barbera	Tom and Jerry	Animation	
Lambert the Sheepish Lion	Jack Hannah		Animated	8 minutes
Merry Mavericks	Edward Bernds	Three Stooges	Comedy	
Nit-Witty Kitty	Hanna-Barbera	Tom and Jerry	Animation	
No Smoking	Jack Kinney	Goofy	Animation	
Pest Man Wins	Jules White	Three Stooges	Comedy	
The Prize Pest	Robert McKimson	Looney Tunes	Animation	Final screwball Daffy Duck cartoon
Rabbit Fire	Chuck Jones	Looney Tunes	Animation	
Scrambled Brains	Jules White	The Three Stooges	Comedy	
Sleepy-Time Tom	Hanna-Barbera	Tom and Jerry	Animation	
Slicked-up Pup	Hanna-Barbera	Tom and Jerry	Animation	
Three Arabian Nuts	Edward Bernds	Three Stooges	Comedy	
The Tooth Will Out	Edward Bernds	The Three Stooges	Comedy	
The Wearing of the Grin	Chuck Jones	Porky Pig	Animated	

== See also ==
- 1951 in the United States
