= Desperadoes' Outpost =

1952 film by Philip Ford

- Directed by: Philip Ford
- Written by: Arthur E. Orloff; Albert DeMond
- Produced by: Rudy Ralston
- Starring: Allan Lane; Roy Barcroft; Eddy Waller
- Cinematography: John MacBurnie
- Edited by: Tony Martinelli
- Music by: Stanley Wilson
- Production company: Republic Pictures
- Distributed by: Republic Pictures
- Release date: October 8, 1952
- Running time: 54 minutes
- Country: United States
- Language: English

Desperadoes' Outpost is a 1952 American Western film directed by Philip Ford and starring Allan Lane, Roy Barcroft and Eddy Waller. It was produced and distributed by Republic Pictures. The film's sets were designed by the art director Frank Hotaling.

== Cast ==
- Allan Lane as Rocky Lane
- Black Jack as Black Jack
- Eddy Waller as Nugget Clark
- Roy Barcroft as Jim Boylan
- Myron Healey as Lieutenant Dan Booker
- Lyle Talbot as Walter Fleming
- Claudia Barrett as Kathy
- Lane Bradford as Henchman Mike
- Lee Roberts as Henchman Spec Matson
- Ed Cassidy as Deputy Marshal
- Charles Evans as Major Seeley
- Zon Murray as Henchman
- Slim Duncan as Sergeant
- Art Dillard as Henchman
- Boyd Stockman as Henchman Tom

== Bibliography ==
- Bernard A. Drew. Motion Picture Series and Sequels: A Reference Guide. Routledge, 2013.
