= Marshal of Cedar Rock =

1953 film

- Directed by: Harry Keller
- Written by: Albert DeMond; M. Coates Webster
- Produced by: Rudy Ralston
- Starring: Allan Lane; Phyllis Coates; Eddy Waller
- Cinematography: John MacBurnie
- Edited by: Tony Martinelli
- Music by: Stanley Wilson
- Production company: Republic Pictures
- Distributed by: Republic Pictures
- Release date: February 1, 1953
- Running time: 54 minutes
- Country: United States
- Language: English

Marshal of Cedar Rock is a 1953 American Western film directed by Harry Keller and starring Allan Lane, Phyllis Coates and Eddy Waller.

The film's art direction was by Frank Hotaling.

== Plot ==
Bill Anderson escapes from prison in an unidentified western state 1890. His escape has been arranged by Rocky Lane with the help of the warden. Rocky is hoping Bill will lead him to the gang and the money they stole. Bill returns to Cedar Rock, followed by Rocky. When Bill's horse goes lame, he gets a ride on a buckboard driven by John Harper.

In Cedar Rock, rancher Nugget Clark wants niece Martha to be nicer to banker Henry Mason, though she is still sweet on Anderson, whom she believes is innocent. Nugget needs a loan because most of his cattle have been rustled and he lost his savings when the bank was robbed. Mason says he can't extend a loan because the bank doesn't have enough money after the robbery. Mason suggests Nugget, and the other ranchers, sell out to the land development company. Nugget won't sell because he thinks the railroad will come to Cedar Creek and he will then get a lot more for his land. He also says the railroad is sending John Harper to look over the town. Mason says the railroad might go through another town.

Bill gets off the Harper's buckboard outside town and walks the rest of the way. Harper visits Mason, who is behind the rustling and robberies. Mason orders two of his henchmen to dispose of Harper, who he thinks hasn't talked to anyone else in town. Bill confronts Mason at gunpoint and says they're going to the sheriff to explain how Mason framed him for the robbery. Rocky overhears, and when Mason says he won't go and Bill threatens to shoot him, Rocky shoots Bill's gun out of his hand. Bill is arrested by the sheriff but on the way to jail, Mason's gang arrives and starts shooting up the town. In the confusion Bill escapes, and the horses pulling Martha's buckboard stampede, but she is saved by Rocky.

Mason has one of his men, Paul Jackson, pose as Harper, who is to try and convince the ranchers that they will be better off selling to the land company. Mason also sends some of the gang after Bill and tells them that if they get a chance to get rid of Rocky too as he thinks he may know too much. Rocky spots Bill and chases him, but Bill gets away and goes to the Clark's ranch. While Nugget is sleeping, Bill convinces Martha that he is innocent. Nugget wakes up and Bill eventually convinces him too. Two of Mason's gang arrive but before they can do anything Rocky arrives. Bill wants to shoot him but Nugget says he will get rid of him. Rocky suspects something is up and bursts into the kitchen to find Bill has just left. He chases him followed by Mason's men.

Rocky catches Bill but before he can talk to him the bandits start shooting and Bill escapes. Rocky kills the two men and finds cigars on one of them that are the same as Mason's. He return's to the Clark's and tells them he is a US Marshall and now thinks Bill is innocent and that Mason is behind the robberies, but he needs more proof. With the Clarks assistance, He pretends to be Nugget's new ranch-hand. The man impersonating Harper arrives and offers Nugget much less than the land company offer. Nugget decides to accept and head to town with Martha. Rocky suspects the man is not the real Harper, and is working for Mason, and tags along.

Bill is searching Mason's office, and when Mason returns hides next door. The Clarks, Rocky and the fake Harper arrive. Bill realizes that it's not the real Harper. When Nugget says he has to accept the land company offer, Bill bursts in and says Harper is a phony but Mason disarms him. Rocky takes Bill to the sheriff. Nugget is about to sign on behalf of the ranchers when Martha stops him. "Harper" sees Rocky take Bill past the sheriff's office. He follows and hears that Bill knows he is not the real Harper, then tells Mason. Rocky and Bill confront "Harper". Rocky says he has sent a telegram to the railroad asking for details about Harper. Eventually "Harper" admits he's a fake and says it was Mason's idea and that he has sent men to kidnap the Clarks and force Nugget to sign the deal for the ranches.

Jackson, a.k.a. Harper, leads Rocky and Bill to the barn where the Clarks are being held by Mason and two of his men. In a shoutout Jackson and the two men are killed and Bill wounded. Rocky eventually overcomes Mason. Mason confesses, Nugget agrees to sell to the railroad and Bill and Martha get engaged.

== Cast ==
- Allan Lane as Marshal Rocky Lane
- Black Jack as Rocky's Horse
- Eddy Waller as Nugget Clark
- Phyllis Coates as Martha Clark
- Roy Barcroft as Henry Mason
- William Henry as Bill Anderson
- Robert Shayne as Paul Jackson / Fake John Harper
- John Crawford as Henchman Chris Peters
- John Hamilton as Prison Warden Stover
- Kenneth MacDonald as Sheriff Blake
- Herbert Lytton as John Harper
- Art Dillard as Henchman
- John Marshall as Bank Clerk
- Joe Yrigoyen as Baylor

== Bibliography ==
- Bernard A. Drew. Motion Picture Series and Sequels: A Reference Guide. Routledge, 2013.
