= Flight to Mars =

Flight to Mars may refer to:

- Flight to Mars (film), a 1951 Cinecolor science fiction film
- Flight to Mars (ride), a former amusement park ride in Seattle's Fun Forest
- Flight to Mars, a UFO tribute band, a side project of Pearl Jam lead guitarist Mike McCready

== See also ==
- Exploration of Mars, uncrewed or hypothesized crewed flights
- Human mission to Mars
