= Red River Shore =

1953 film by Harry Keller

- Directed by: Harry Keller
- Written by: Arthur E. Orloff; Gerald Geraghty
- Produced by: Rudy Ralston
- Starring: Rex Allen; Lyn Thomas; Slim Pickens
- Cinematography: Bud Thackery
- Edited by: Harold Minter
- Music by: R. Dale Butts
- Production company: Republic Pictures
- Distributed by: Republic Pictures
- Release date: December 15, 1953
- Running time: 54 minutes
- Country: United States
- Language: English

Red River Shore is a 1953 American Western film directed by Harry Keller and starring Rex Allen, Lyn Thomas and Slim Pickens.

The film's sets were designed by the art director Frank Hotaling.

== Cast ==
- Rex Allen as Marshal Rex Allen
- Koko as Rex's Horse
- Slim Pickens as Deputy Slim Pickens
- Lyn Thomas as Peggy Taylor
- William Philpps as Ned Barlow
- Douglas Fowley as Case Lockwood
- Trevor Bardette as Frank Barlow
- William Haade as Henchman Link
- Emmett Vogan as Benjamin Willoughby, Banker
- John L. Cason as Henchman Joe
- Rayford Barnes as Henchman Pete
- Virginia Carroll as Townswoman
- Nolan Leary as Townsman
- Frank O'Connor as Townsman
- Jack Perrin as Work Crew Member
- Ken Terrell as Henchman

== Bibliography ==
- England, Jerry. Reel Cowboys of the Santa Susanas. ECHO Press, 2008.
