= Tension at Table Rock =

1956 film by Charles Marquis Warren

- Theatrical release poster
- Directed by: Charles Marquis Warren
- Screenplay by: Winston Miller
- Based on: Bitter Sage; 1954 novel by Frank Gruber
- Produced by: Sam Wiesenthal
- Starring: Richard Egan; Dorothy Malone; Cameron Mitchell; Angie Dickinson
- Cinematography: Joseph F. Biroc
- Edited by: Doane Harrison; Harry Marker
- Music by: Dimitri Tiomkin
- Production company: Sam Wiesenthal Productions
- Distributed by: RKO Radio Pictures
- Release date: October 3, 1956
- Running time: 93 minutes
- Country: United States
- Language: English
- Box office: $1.4 million (US/Canada rentals)

Tension at Table Rock is a 1956 American Western drama film directed by Charles Marquis Warren and starring Richard Egan and Dorothy Malone. The film stars Richard Egan as a man vilified after killing a famous gunslinger who was a public hero.

== Plot ==
After killing a man whom many thought was his friend, Wes Tancred is assaulted and immortalized in an uncomplimentary song about one man shooting his best friend in the back; when in fact Wes' friend was reaching for his gun to shoot Wes in the back as he started out the door. Wes leaves town and winds up working as a hostler at a Stagecoach Outpost. He adopts an alias and befriends the father and son who run the outpost. Three outlaws arrive with plans to rob the stagecoach when it arrives. The father is killed in a showdown with the three outlaws. Wes kills them and takes the boy to live with his aunt and uncle, who is the Sheriff in Table Rock. A reckless band of herders that are running a cattle drive come to town with revelry and kill a sodbuster. In court there is testimony presented that the murder was self-defense because the ramrodder had placed a weapon in the victim's hand. Both the Sheriff and Wes are aware of this; however, the Sheriff, who was traumatized from a previous beating, states in his report that it was self-defense. He revises his report when Wes steps forward with testimony to the contrary, challenging him to overcome his fear. Wes shoots down a hired gun that comes to town to kill the Sheriff and the Sheriff, in turn, shoots the man who hires the gunman when he attempts to shoot Wes in the back.

== Cast ==
- Richard Egan as Wes Tancred / John Bailey
- Dorothy Malone as Lorna Miller
- Cameron Mitchell as Fred Miller
- Billy Chapin as Jody Burrows
- Royal Dano as Harry Jameson
- Edward Andrews as Kirk
- John Dehner as Hampton
- DeForest Kelley as Jim Breck
- Joe De Santis as Ed Burrows (as Joe DeSantis)
- Angie Dickinson as Cathy
- Paul Richards as Sam Murdock
- Lauren Chapin as Little Girl (uncredited)
- Charles H. Gray as Zecca (uncredited)
- Joyce Jameson as Singer (uncredited)
- Suzanne Ridgeway as Saloon Girl (uncredited)
- Jeanne Bates as Mrs. Brice (uncredited)

== Production ==
Sterling Hayden claimed he had been hired for six weeks to appear in the film but RKO Pictures disclaimed the agreement so he sued them for $35,000. RKO settled out of court.

== See also ==
- List of American films of 1956
