= Shadows of Tombstone =

1953 film by William Witney

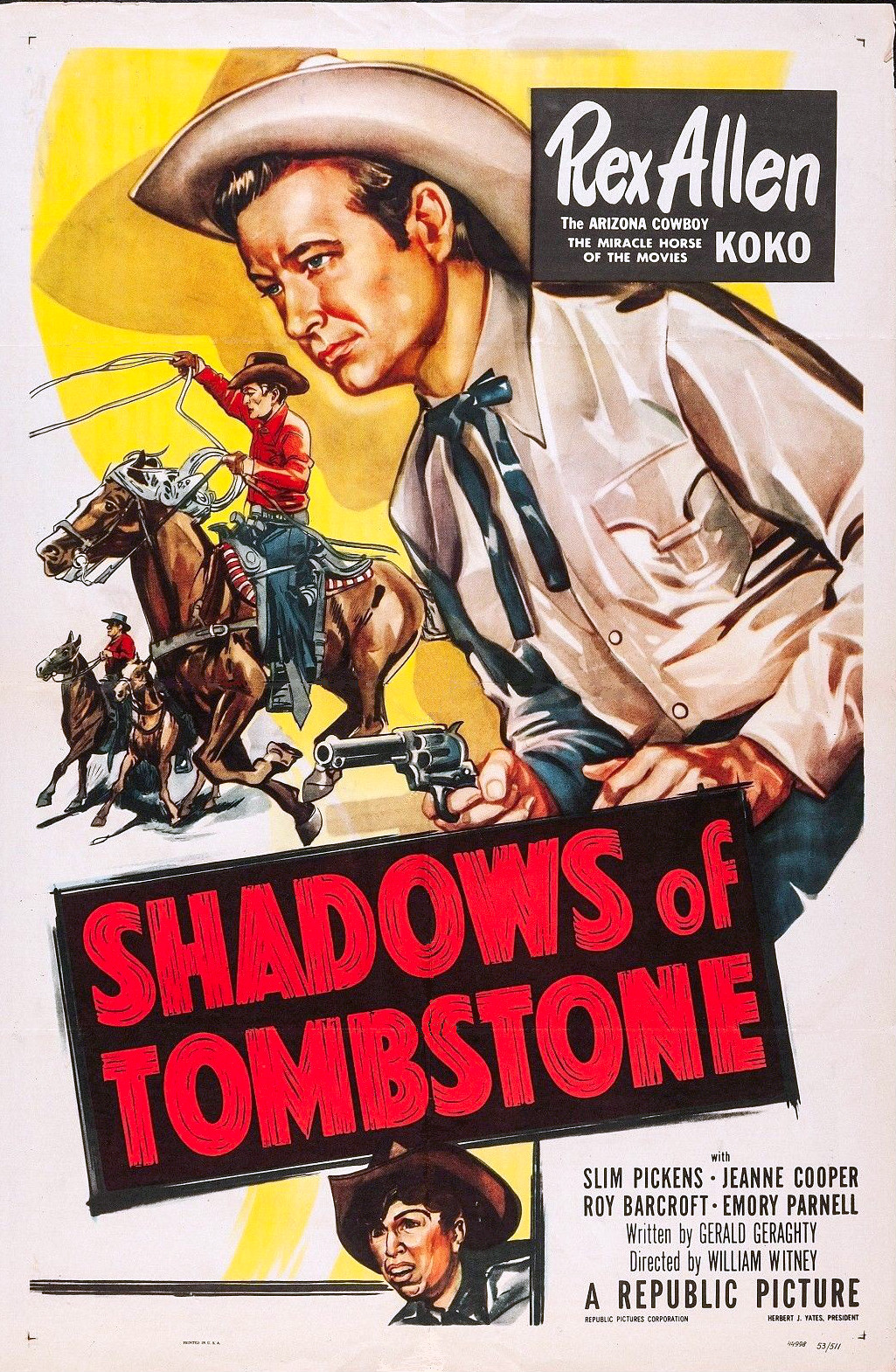
- Directed by: William Witney
- Written by: Gerald Geraghty
- Produced by: Rudy Ralston
- Starring: Rex Allen; Jeanne Cooper; Slim Pickens
- Cinematography: Bud Thackery
- Edited by: Richard L. Van Enger
- Music by: R. Dale Butts
- Production company: Republic Pictures
- Distributed by: Republic Pictures
- Release date: September 28, 1953
- Running time: 54 minutes
- Country: United States
- Language: English

Shadows of Tombstone is a 1953 American Western film directed by William Witney and starring Rex Allen, Jeanne Cooper and Slim Pickens.

The film's art direction was by Frank Hotaling.

== Cast ==
- Rex Allen as Rancher Rex Allen
- Koko as Rex's Horse
- Slim Pickens as Slim
- Jeanne Cooper as Marge
- Roy Barcroft as Mike
- Emory Parnell as Sheriff Webb
- Ric Roman as Manuel Delgado
- Richard Avonde as Deputy Todd
- Julian Rivero as Delgado Ally
- George Bell as Townsman
- Roy Bucko as Townsman
- Art Dillard as Barfly
- Chick Hannan as Henchman
- Rex Lease as Fake Drunk
- Jack Montgomery as Posse Rider
- Bob Reeves as Posse Rider
- Clarence Straight as Ed Phillips

== Bibliography ==
- Bernard A. Drew. Motion Picture Series and Sequels: A Reference Guide. Routledge, 2013.
