= Herbert Lytton =

American film and television actor (1897–1981)

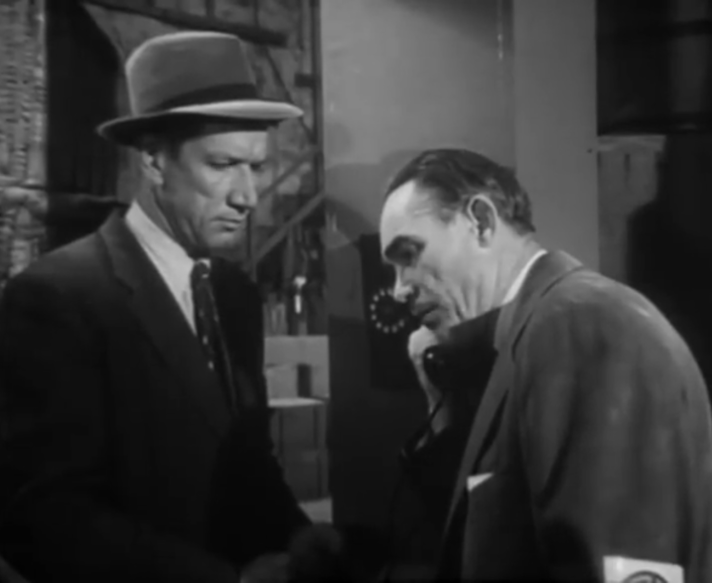
- Lytton (right) with Richard Boone in Medic, 1955
- Born: Herbert Lytton Cress; December 9, 1897; Falmouth, Kentucky, U.S.
- Died: June 26, 1981 (aged 83); Las Cruces, New Mexico, U.S.
- Occupations: Film and television actor
- Years active: 1937–1966
- Children: 1

Herbert Lytton Cress (December 9, 1897 – June 26, 1981) was an American film and television actor. He was known for playing Admiral Reynolds in the American sitcom television series McHale's Navy.

== Life and career ==
Lytton was born in Falmouth, Kentucky. He began his screen career in 1937, appearing in the film Stolen Holiday, playing the uncredited role of a fashion show photographer. He then appeared in the films Captain America and The Black Parachute, and played Chuck Johnson in the 1950 film Champagne for Caesar.

Later in his career, Lytton guest-starred in numerous television programs including Gunsmoke, Bonanza, Tombstone Territory, Wagon Train, 77 Sunset Strip, Tales of Wells Fargo, Perry Mason, The Twilight Zone,The Donna Reed Show, The Deputy and Voyage to the Bottom of the Sea. He also appeared in films such as Marshal of Cedar Rock, Behind the High Wall, Mission Over Korea, The Gallant Hours, The Glass Web, Man of a Thousand Faces and The Cosmic Man (as General Knowland).

== Death ==
Lytton died on June 26, 1981, in Las Cruces, New Mexico, at the age of 83.

== Selected filmography ==
- Alfred Hitchcock Presents (1955) (Season 1 Episode 1: "Revenge") as Police Lieutenant
- Gunsmoke (1956) (Season 2 Episode 3: "Custer") as Town Judge in Hays County
- Alfred Hitchcock Presents (1958) (Season 4 Episode 5: "The $2,000,000 Defense") as Doctor
- Wagon Train (1959) (Season 3 Episode 10: "The Danny Benedict Story") as an Army Doctor
