= Billy Chapin =

American actor (1943–2016)

- Chapin in The Night of the Hunter, 1955
- Born: William McClellan Chapin; December 28, 1943; Los Angeles, California, U.S.
- Died: December 2, 2016 (aged 72)
- Occupation: Actor
- Years active: 1944–1959
- Children: 3
- Relatives: Michael Chapin (brother); Lauren Chapin (sister)
- Awards: 1951 New York Drama Critics Award for Three Wishes For Jamie (stage musical version)

William McClellan Chapin (December 28, 1943 – December 2, 2016) was an American child actor, known for a considerable number of screen and TV performances from 1943 to 1959 and best remembered for both his roles as the "diaper manager" Christie Cooper in the 1953 family feature The Kid from Left Field and little John Harper in Charles Laughton's 1955 film noir movie The Night of the Hunter.

Chapin was the brother of child actors Lauren Chapin, known as Kathy "Kitten" Anderson, from the TV series Father Knows Best and of Michael Chapin, another child performer of the 1940s and 1950s.

== Life and career ==
Born William McClellan Chapin on December 28, 1943, in Los Angeles, he was the second of three children of Roy Chapin, a bank manager, and Marquerite Alice Barringer, who later became a kind of personal coach for all of her children's acting careers. His sister Lauren later told about alcohol problems and sexual abuse in the troubled family.

=== Early roles and Broadway ===
When only a few weeks old, Chapin made his screen debut in the uncredited role of "Baby Girl" in 1944's Casanova Brown, starring Gary Cooper. Five months later he had another uncredited baby role in Marriage Is a Private Affair, starring Lana Turner. He had another bit role in The Cockeyed Miracle in 1946. He started acting professionally in 1951 in a supporting role in the Broadway stage musical Three Wishes for Jamie, which, while passably successful, toured the West Coast in the summer of the same year. After essential changes regarding dramatization of the play and replacements in the original West Coast cast, when the play moved to New York City in early 1952, it finally became a considerable success and earned him the N.Y. Drama Critics Award as the most promising young actor of the year.

=== From The Kid from Left Field to A Man Called Peter ===
This stage success might have earned him his role as the grandson in the 1952 TV adaption of Paul Osborn's 1938 Broadway play, On Borrowed Time at the Celanese Theatre, but his first real screen role he landed just one year later as the "Diaper Manager" Christie Cooper, the lead role of the 1953 family release The Kid from Left Field, starring Dan Dailey, Anne Bancroft and Lloyd Bridges.

He then did three successive episodes of Jack Webb's Dragnet and two other television shows before he portrayed Brian "Gadge" Robertson, the bright grandson of a fictive astroscientist in the science fiction B-flick Tobor the Great, 1954.

Two smaller screen appearances then fell into line, one in a film noir, entitled Naked Alibi, 1954, with Sterling Hayden and Gloria Grahame and another bit role in the famous screen musical There's No Business Like Show Business, again starring Dan Dailey with Donald O'Connor and Marilyn Monroe, before the boy gained his next memorable screen attentions as the young son of historic clergyman Peter Marshall in A Man Called Peter and Victor Mature's screen son in his second film noir: Violent Saturday, both of which were released in 1955. In between he continued to appear in standard television series such as Waterfront, The Millionaire, Cheyenne, and My Friend Flicka, and various TV theaters, anthologies and dramas.

=== The Night of the Hunter ===
Robert Mitchum and Billy Chapin in The Night of the Hunter, 1955

When Charles Laughton personally cast Billy Chapin for the role of young John Harper in his 1955 film classic The Night of the Hunter, the boy was already considered an "acting technician" among the child performers of his time. After a private meeting with Billy in his Hollywood home, Laughton told Davis Grubb, the author of the original story: "What I want is a flexible child, and the boy is exactly that." Later, Laughton publicly offered praise especially for "...the strength of [Chapin's] innate ability to understand the construction of a scene, its impact and its importance." Vintage sources claimed that Laughton might find it difficult to direct Chapin, as well as Sally Jane Bruce, who played his younger sister (Pearl Harper), but contemporary sources and rediscovered archival material from the production of The Night of the Hunter prove that, aside from a few intergenerational tiffs, the old man and the boy got along wonderfully, even if, according to these sources, Robert Mitchum, who played the bogus preacher Harry Powell, in fact took over some directing tasks.

Charles Laughton directing Billy Chapin, watched by Peter Graves in The Night of the Hunter, 1955

Though now considered a classic, The Night of the Hunter was a critical and commercial failure when released, "because of its lack of the proper trappings." The film was an inductee in the 1992 National Film Registry list.

=== Tension at Table Rock and career on TV ===
Chapin's final big screen appearance came just a year after The Night of the Hunter, as young Jody Burrows in the 1956 B-Western Tension at Table Rock, starring Richard Egan. From then on his film career declined until he was acting solely on television, where his career eventually ended late in 1959 in an episode of the long-running family series Fury (1955–60).

== Personal life and death ==
In her own biography, Chapin's sister Lauren describes Chapin as having had alcohol and drug problems in his twenties and thirties. Billy Chapin served in the United States Marines, achieved a college education and went into private industry. He married and had three children. In his later years, he was plagued by health problems.

Chapin died December 2, 2016, after a long illness, aged 72. He died of lung cancer while suffering from dementia, having previously had a stroke.

== Work ==
=== Filmography (in order of release) ===
Year	Title	Role	Notes
1944	Casanova Brown	The Brown's Baby Girl	Uncredited
1944	Marriage Is a Private Affair	The Baby	Uncredited
1946	The Cockeyed Miracle	Boy	a.k.a. The Return of Mr. Griggs (US promotional title) a.k.a. Mr. Griggs Returns (UK)
1953	Affair with a Stranger	Timmy	
1953	The Kid from Left Field	Christie Cooper	
1954	Tobor the Great	Brian "Gadge" Robertson	
1954	Naked Alibi	Petey	
1954	There's No Business Like Show Business	Steve Donahue, aged 10	Uncredited
1955	A Man Called Peter	Peter John Marshall	
1955	Violent Saturday	Steve Martin	
1955	The Night of the Hunter	John Harper	
1956	Tension at Table Rock	Jody Burrows	

=== On the stage ===
Year	Play	Role	Other notes
1951/1952	Three Wishes for Jamie	Kevin	N.Y. Drama Critics Award

=== Television (in order of airing) ===
Year	Show/Series/Episode	Role	Other notes
1951	Celanese Theatre - Episode: Winterset	unknown	originally aired on 31 October
1952	Celanese Theatre - Episode: On Borrowed Time	Grandson	originally aired on June 25
1953	Dragnet (a.k.a. Badge 714) - Episode: The Big White Rat	unknown	originally aired on September 3
1953	Dragnet (a.k.a. Badge 714) - Episode: The Big Little Jesus	Joseph Hefferman	originally aired on December 24
1954	Dragnet (a.k.a. Badge 714) - Episode: The Big Children	Richard Kessler	originally aired on February 11
1954	A Letter To Loretta (a.k.a. The Loretta Young Show/Theatre) - Episode: The New York Story	Robbie Thorne	originally aired on February 28
1954	Lux Video Theatre (a.k.a. Summer Video Theatre)- Episode: Pick Off The Litter	Jeremy	originally aired on April 8
1954	Waterfront - Episode: The Rift	Teddy Herrick	originally airing unknown
1954	Waterfront - Episode: Sunken Treasure	Teddy Herrick	originally aired on August 28
1954	Waterfront - Episode: Capt'n Long John	Teddy Herrick	originally aired on September 19
1955	Stage 7 - The Greatest Man In The World	Todd Jennings	originally aired on March 13
1955	Lux Video Theatre (a.k.a. Summer Video Theatre)- Episode: The Last Confession	Gaston	originally aired on September 1
1955	Celebrity Playhouse - Episode: Day Of The Trial	unknown	originally aired on October 4
1955	Cheyenne - Episode: "Julesburg"	Tommy Scott	originally aired on October 11
1955	General Electric Theater (a.k.a. G.E. Theatre)- Outpost At Home	unknown	originally aired on October 23
1955	The Millionaire (a.k.a. If I Had A Million) - The Tom Bryan Story	Tom Bryan	originally aired on November 2
1955	My Friend Flicka - Episode: Silver Saddle	unknown	originally aired on December 16
1956	Ford Star Jubilee - Episode: The Day Lincoln Was Shot	unknown	originally aired on February 1
1956	Fury (a.k.a. Brave Stallion) - Episode: The Test	Louis Baxter Jr.	originally aired on March 3
1956	TV Reader's Digest - Episode: Lost, Strayed And Lonely (a.k.a. It's A Wise Father)	Christopher	originally aired on March 5
1956	Climax! (a.k.a. Climax Mystery Theatre) - Episode: A Trophy For Howard Davenport	Billy	originally aired on June 28
1956	Crossroads - Episode: Tenement Saint	Jerry	originally aired on December 14
1957	The Ford Television Theatre (a.k.a. Ford Theatre) - Episode: Ringside Seat	Billy Curran	originally aired on February 13
1957	Dick Powell's Zane Grey Theater (a.k.a. The Westerners)- Episode: Black Creek Encounter	Billy Morrison	originally aired on March 8
1957	Panic! (a.k.a. No Warning - US second season title) - Episode: The Boy	Tommy Williams	originally aired on March 19
1958	Meet McGraw - Episode: Friend Of The Court	Tommy Cassidy	originally aired on February 25
1958	The Californians - Episode: The Marshall	Joey	originally aired on March 11
1959	Leave It to Beaver - Episode: The Grass Is Always Greener	Pete Fletcher	originally aired on January 8
1959	Frontier Justice - Episode: Black Creek Encounter	Billy Morrison	originally aired on July 27
1959	Fury (a.k.a. Brave Stallion) - Episode: The Rocketeers	Vic Rockwell	originally aired on December 5 (final appearance)
