= Ric Roman =

American actor

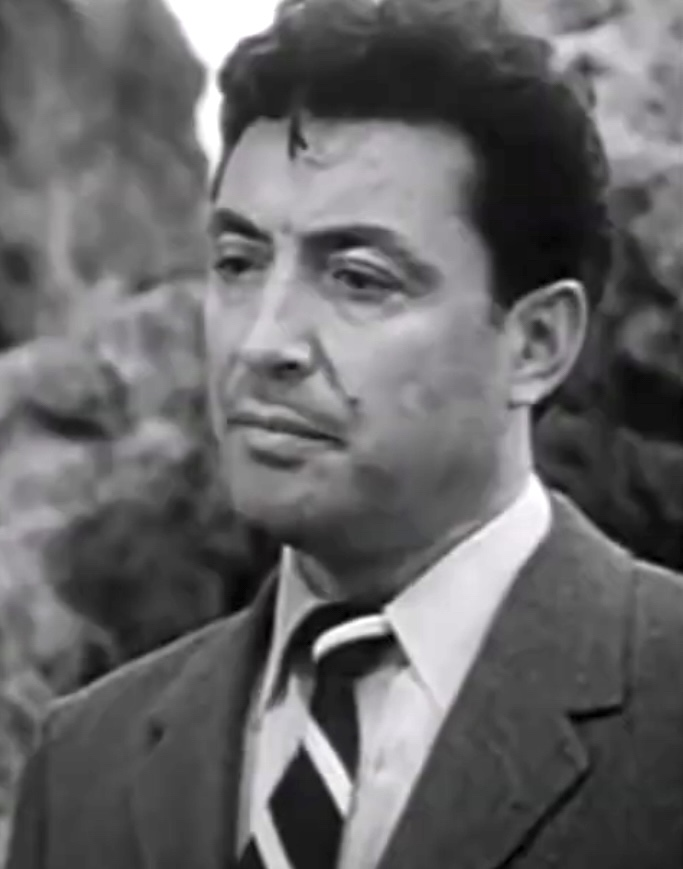
- Roman in an episode of Lock-Up (1959)
- Born: Ric R. Roman; September 29, 1916; New York City, U.S.
- Died: August 11, 2000 (aged 83); Los Angeles, California, U.S.
- Resting place: Hillside Memorial Park Cemetery
- Other names: Earl Breitbard, Earl Breitband
- Occupation: Actor
- Years active: 1950–1971

Ric R. Roman (September 29, 1916 – August 11, 2000) was an American actor. He was perhaps best known for his roles in the films Lone Star (1952), Shadows of Tombstone (1953), Lizzie (1957) and The Wayward Girl (1957). He also appeared in a number of television series, notably Zorro (1957–1959) and Batman (year two, episodes 29 and 30).

== Career ==
Roman appeared in the 1957 film Lizzie, in which two days before the filming began he broke his finger in an accident, so he used a temporary splint that can be removed during scenes.

== Death ==
Roman died August 11, 2000 in Los Angeles. He is interred at Hillside Memorial Park Cemetery in Culver City, California.

== Filmography ==
=== Film ===
Year	Title	Role	Notes
1950	The Damned Don't Cry	Sam Loman - Syndicate Boss	Uncredited
1950	Women from Headquarters		Uncredited
1950	Kiss Tomorrow Goodbye	Mob Collector	Uncredited
1950	Between Midnight and Dawn	Rod Peters	
1951	Navy Bound	Tony Cerrano	
1951	Sirocco	Orderly	Uncredited
1951	The Texas Rangers	Prison Guard	Uncredited
1951	Mask of the Avenger	Guard	Uncredited
1951	The Mob	Cop	Uncredited
1951	Slaughter Trail	Chief Paako	Uncredited
1951	South of Caliente	Josef	
1951	The Lady Pays Off	Ricky	
1952	Scandal Sheet	Elkins, Reporter	Uncredited
1952	Harem Girl	Hamad	
1952	Lone Star	Gurau	
1952	Viva Zapata!	Manager	Uncredited
1952	Hoodlum Empire	Fergus	Uncredited
1952	Actor's and Sin	Clyde Veering	(segment "Actor's Blood")
1952	Springfield Rifle	Guard	Uncredited
1952	Kansas City Confidential	Rick - Eddie's Brother	Uncredited
1953	The Sabre and the Arrow	Martinez	
1953	Scared Stiff	Gangster	Martin & Lewis comedy; uncredited
1953	99 River Street	Monk	Uncredited
1953	Shadows of Tombstone	Manuel Delgado	
1953	The Big Heat	Baldy	
1953	Appointment in Honduras	Jiminez	
1953	Slaves of Babylon	Daniel's Aide	
1954	Rails Into Laramie	Johnny Logan	Uncredited
1954	About Mrs. Leslie	Rick	
1954	Masterson of Kansas	Defense Attorney	Uncredited
1955	Timberjack	Razullo	Uncredited
1955	Underwater!	Jesus	
1955	Ma and Pa Kettle at Waikiki	Chuck Collins - Kidnapper	Uncredited
1955	The Road to Denver	Saloon Card Dealer	Uncredited
1955	Wiretapper	Nick Castro	
1955	The Desperate Hours	Sal	Uncredited
1956	Terror at Midnight	Police Sgt. Brazzi	
1956	The Best Things in Life Are Free	Henchman	Uncredited
1956	The Ten Commandments	Hebrew at Rameses' Gate	Uncredited
1956	Accused of Murder	Nightclub Doorman	Uncredited
1957	Duel at Apache Wells	Frank	
1957	Gun for a Coward	Bandit	Uncredited
1957	Lizzie	Johnny Valenzo	
1957	Omar Khayyam	Slavemaster	Uncredited
1957	The Wayward Girl	Eddie Nolan	
1957	Jet Pilot	Guard	Uncredited
1957	Up in Smoke	Tony	
1958	King Creole	Eddie	Uncredited
1958	The Buccaneer	Tim - Pirate	Uncredited
1958	Some Came Running	Joe	Uncredited
1960	The Threat	Lucky's Underworld Contact	
1966	Nevada Smith	Cipriano	

=== Television ===
Year	Title	Role	Notes
1959	Have Gun - Will Travel	Morales	Season 3, Episode 21 "Hunt the Man Down"
1962	Straightaway	Greiger	Episode "Sounds of Fury"
1964	Gunsmoke	Sims	Episode "Innocence"

== Bibliography ==
- Lentz, Robert. Gloria Grahame, Bad Girl of Film Noir: The Complete Career. McFarland, 2011.
