= Escape from Red Rock =

1957 film by Edward Bernds

- Theatrical release poster
- Directed by: Edward Bernds
- Screenplay by: Edward Bernds
- Produced by: Bernard Glasser
- Starring: Brian Donlevy; Eilene Janssen; Gary Murray; Jay C. Flippen; William Edward Phipps; Myron Healey
- Cinematography: Brydon Baker
- Edited by: John F. Link Sr.
- Music by: Les Baxter
- Production company: Regal Films Inc
- Distributed by: 20th Century Fox
- Release date: December 1957
- Running time: 75 minutes
- Country: United States
- Language: English

Escape from Red Rock is a 1957 American Western film written and directed by Edward Bernds. The film starred Brian Donlevy, Eilene Janssen, Gary Murray, Jay C. Flippen, William Edward Phipps and Myron Healey. The film was released in December 1957 by 20th Century Fox.

== Cast ==
- Brian Donlevy as Bronc Grierson
- Eilene Janssen as Janie Acker
- Gary Murray as Cal Bowman
- Jay C. Flippen as Sheriff John Costaine
- William Edward Phipps as Arky Shanks
- Myron Healey as Joe Skinner
- Nesdon Booth as Pete Archer
- Dan White as Al Farris
- Al Baffert as Guard
- Court Shepard as Rube Boyce
- Tina Menard as Maria Chavez
- Natividad Vacío as Don Miguel Chavez
- Zon Murray as Krug
- Rick Vallin as Judd Bowman
- Ed Hinton as Tarrant
- Frosty Royce as Stage driver
- Frank Richards as Price
- Linda Dangcil as Elena Chavez
- Eumenio Blanco as The Mayor
- Elena Da Vinci as Antonia Chavez
- Hank Patterson as Sheriff Grover
- Eileen Stevens as Mrs. Donnelly
- Frank Marlowe as Manager
- Joe Becker as Clerk
- Dick Crockett as Krug henchman

== Production ==
Production started 29 July 1957.
