= Rudy Ralston =

American film producer

Rudy Ralston (born Prague) was a Czech-American film producer. The brother of figure skater turned actress Vera Ralston, who was married to the head of Republic Pictures Herbert Yates, he was employed by Republic Pictures, making B westerns during the 1950s.

== Filmography ==
- Buckaroo Sheriff of Texas (1951)
- The Dakota Kid (1951)
- Arizona Manhunt (1951)
- Wild Horse Ambush (1952)
- Thundering Caravans (1952)
- Desperadoes' Outpost (1952)
- El Paso Stampede (1953)
- Shadows of Tombstone (1953)
- Savage Frontier (1953)
- Bandits of the West (1953)
- Marshal of Cedar Rock (1953)
- Down Laredo Way (1953)
- Red River Shore (1953)
- Phantom Stallion (1954)
- Crooked Ring (1955)
- No Man's Woman (1955)
- Terror at Midnight (1956)
- Hell's Crossroads (1957)
- The Last Stagecoach West (1957)
- The Crooked Circle (1957)
- The Lawless Eighties (1957)
- Gunfire at Indian Gap (1957)
- The Notorious Mr. Monks (1958)
- The Man Who Died Twice (1958)

== Bibliography ==
- Roberts, Randy John Wayne: American. University of Nebraska Press, 1997.
