= Sugarfoot (film) =

1951 film by Edwin L. Marin

- Movie poster
- Directed by: Edwin L. Marin
- Written by: Russell S. Hughes (adaptation)
- Based on: Clarence Budington Kelland (novel)
- Produced by: Saul Elkins
- Starring: Randolph Scott
- Cinematography: Wilfred M. Cline
- Edited by: Clarence Kolster
- Music by: Max Steiner
- Color process: Technicolor
- Production company: Warner Bros. Pictures
- Distributed by: Warner Bros. Pictures
- Release date: February 11, 1951 (New York)
- Running time: 80 minutes
- Country: United States
- Language: English
- Box office: $1.6 million (U.S. rentals)

Sugarfoot is a 1951 American Western film directed by Edwin L. Marin and starring Randolph Scott.

Aside from its title, the film is completely unrelated to the 1957 television series of the same name, which was inspired by Michael Curtiz's The Boy from Oklahoma (1954), starring Will Rogers Jr. However, because of the lingering popularity of the television show, Warner Bros. temporarily changed the film's title to A Swirl of Glory when it was first syndicated to television in 1962.

== Plot ==
Jackson Redan, a Confederate States Army veteran of the American Civil War, attempts to rebuild his life by moving to Arizona Territory. His politeness and courtly Southern gentleman demeanor cause the residents of Prescott to name him Sugarfoot. Among his new acquaintances are merchant Don Miguel Wormser and saloon singer Reva Cairn. An enemy from Redan's past, Jacob Stint, also lives in Prescott and pays unwanted attention to Reva. Redan rescues her, but later treats her coldly. Wormser entrusts Redan with $4,000, which Stint steals, but Wormser forgives Redan. On business for Wormser, Redan makes a favorable deal that earns him the enmity of Wormser's rival, Asa Goodhue. Redan reclaims the stolen money from Stint but is shot in the process. Reva nurses him during his recovery, which thaws his attitude toward her. Stint and Goodhue continue to cheat the townspeople, so Redan resolves to end their villainy.

== Cast ==
- Randolph Scott as Jackson "Sugarfoot" Redan
- Adele Jergens as Reva Cairn
- Raymond Massey as Jacob Stint
- S. Z. Sakall as Don Miguel Wormser
- Robert Warwick as J.C. Crane
- Arthur Hunnicutt as Fly-Up-the-Creek Jones
- Hugh Sanders as Asa Goodhue
- Philo McCullough as Man in Saloon (uncredited)

== Reception ==
In a contemporary review for The New York Times, critic Thomas M. Pryor wrote: "'Sugarfoot' is the kind of Western that holds no· surprises. In fact, it holds no entertainment, despite the ammunition expended and the exciting ·complexion of the countryside in Technicolor."

== See also ==
- List of American films of 1951
