= Eilene Janssen =

American actress

- Born: May 25, 1938 (age 88); Los Angeles, California, U.S.
- Occupation: Film actress
- Years active: 1940–1968
- Spouses: Harry Ronald Rothschild (m. 1957; div. 1962) Thomas Alexander Orchard (m. 1963; div. 1966) George Ellis Moore (m. 1968; died 2000)
- Children: 5

Mary Eilene Janssen (born May 25, 1938) is an American retired film and television actress.

== Early life ==
Eilene Janssen was born in Los Angeles, California on May 25, 1938, to Henry Janssen and Mary Ellen Thompson.

== Film career ==
Janssen began her film career as a child actress in the early 1940s. With her father being a longtime employee of Universal Pictures, she made her first screen appearance in the 1940 film Sandy Gets Her Man. She continued to have bit parts in several movies, such as Two Girls and a Sailor and It Happened Tomorrow. In 1944, she was awarded the title "Little Miss America".

As Janssen grew older, she gained more prominent roles such as Elise in Song of Love and Peggy in The Boy with Green Hair. She and Michael Chapin were the juvenile leads in four Westerns between 1951 and 1952, all of which were directed by Philip Ford. She played Judy Dawson. As a young adult, she was the female lead in the 1957 Western film Escape from Red Rock.

Apart from films, Janssen also acted in television series including The Gene Autry Show,The Adventures of Ozzie and Harriet, Father Knows Best, Mister Ed, The George Burns and Gracie Allen Show, Tales of Wells Fargo, Make Room for Daddy, The Many Loves of Dobie Gillis, The Beverly Hillbillies and Perry Mason.

Janssen retired from acting in 1968. As of 2004, she was living in Pasadena, California.

== Personal life ==
Janssen married Harry Ronald Rothschild on November 29, 1957. They had two children together before they divorced in 1962. She married Thomas Alexander Orchard in 1963. They had one child together before their 1966 divorce. Janssen married George Ellis Moore in 1968. They had two children. Moore died in 2000.

== Filmography ==
Year	Title	Role	Notes
1940	Sandy Gets Her Man	Child	Uncredited
1943	Where Are Your Children?	Child in day care nursery	Uncredited
1944	It Happened Tomorrow	Sylvia	Uncredited
1944	Two Girls and a Sailor	Patsy, age 4	Uncredited
1944	Since You Went Away	Sergeant's child	Uncredited
1944	The Seventh Cross	Girl in Orchard	Uncredited
1944	Till We Meet Again	Yvonne	Uncredited
1944	Army Wives	Young girl	Uncredited
1945	Man Alive	Angel	Uncredited
1946	The Green Years	Alison Keith as a child	
1946	Rendezvous 24	Anchaka Schmidt	
1946	Renegades	Janina Jackorski	Uncredited
1947	The Millerson Case	Myra Minnich	Uncredited
1947	Curley	Betty	
1947	The Hal Roach Comedy Carnival	Betty	
1947	Driftwood	Girl	Uncredited
1947	Song of Love	Elise Schumann	
1947	Beyond Our Own	Shirley Rogers	Uncredited
1948	On Our Merry Way	Peggy Thorndyke	
1948	The Bride Goes Wild	Mary	Uncredited
1948	Who Killed Doc Robbin	Betty	
1948	Borrowed Trouble	Child	
1948	The Boy With Green Hair	Peggy	
1948	Words and Music	Linda, age 8	Uncredited
1951	Buckaroo Sheriff of Texas	Judy Dawson	
1951	The Dakota Kid	Judy Dawson	
1951	Arizona Manhunt	Judy Dawson	
1952	Wild Horse Ambush	Judy Dawson	
1952	Sally and Saint Anne	Young Jeanne	Uncredited
1954	About Mrs. Leslie	Pixie Croffman	
1956	The Search for Bridey Murphy	Bridey Murphy at age 15	
1957	Beginning of the End	Teenager in car	
1957	Escape from Red Rock	Janie Acker	
1958	The Space Children	Phyllis Manley	
1962	Perry Mason	Maureen Franklin	
1963	Black Zoo	Bride	
1968	Panic in the City	Information clerk	(final film role)

== Bibliography ==
- Goldrup, Tom and Jim (2002). Growing Up on the Set: Interviews with 39 Former Child Actors of Film and Television. McFarland & Co. pp. 153–160. ISBN 1476613702.
