= The Kid from Left Field (1953 film) =

1953 film by Harmon Jones

- Directed by: Harmon Jones
- Written by: Jack Sher
- Produced by: Leonard Goldstein
- Starring: Dan Dailey; Anne Bancroft; Billy Chapin
- Cinematography: Harry Jackson
- Edited by: William H. Reynolds
- Music by: Lionel Newman (uncredited)
- Production company: 20th Century Fox
- Distributed by: 20th Century Fox
- Release dates: June 29, 1953 (United States); July 31, 1953 (Los Angeles)
- Running time: 80 minutes
- Country: United States
- Language: English
- Budget: $670,000

The Kid from Left Field is a 1953 black-and-white baseball comedy film starring Dan Dailey, Anne Bancroft, Lloyd Bridges, and Billy Chapin. The film marked the reunion of Dailey and director Harmon Jones, who had teamed up at 20th Century Fox a year earlier in another baseball film, the biographical The Pride of St. Louis.

The film was remade for television in 1979, starring Gary Coleman, Gary Collins and Robert Guillaume.

== Plot ==
Former ballplayer "Coop" (Dailey) is working as a peanut vendor at the ballpark of a struggling major league club, the Bisons. He has passed on his love of the game to his son Christie (Chapin), but after sneaking his son into the game one too many times, he is fired from his job. Christie ingratiates himself with the former owner's niece (Bancroft) and gets his father's job back as well as a position as batboy for himself.

As a publicity stunt, Christie is named their youngest manager ever, but when he falls ill, Coop replaces him as manager. The Bisons win the pennant and earn a spot in the World Series.

== Cast ==
- Dan Dailey as Larry "Pop" Cooper
- Anne Bancroft as Marian Foley
- Billy Chapin as Christie Cooper
- Lloyd Bridges as Pete Haines
- Ray Collins as Fred F. Whacker
- Richard Egan as Billy Lorant
- Bob Hopkins as Bobo Noonan
- Alex Gerry as J.R. Johnson
- Walter Sande as Barnes
- Fess Parker as McDougal
- John Goddard as Riordan
- John McKee as Hunch Harrison
- Paul Wexler as umpire (uncredited)

== See also ==
- The Pride of St. Louis (1952)
- List of baseball films
