= Stuart Randall (actor) =

American actor (1909–1988

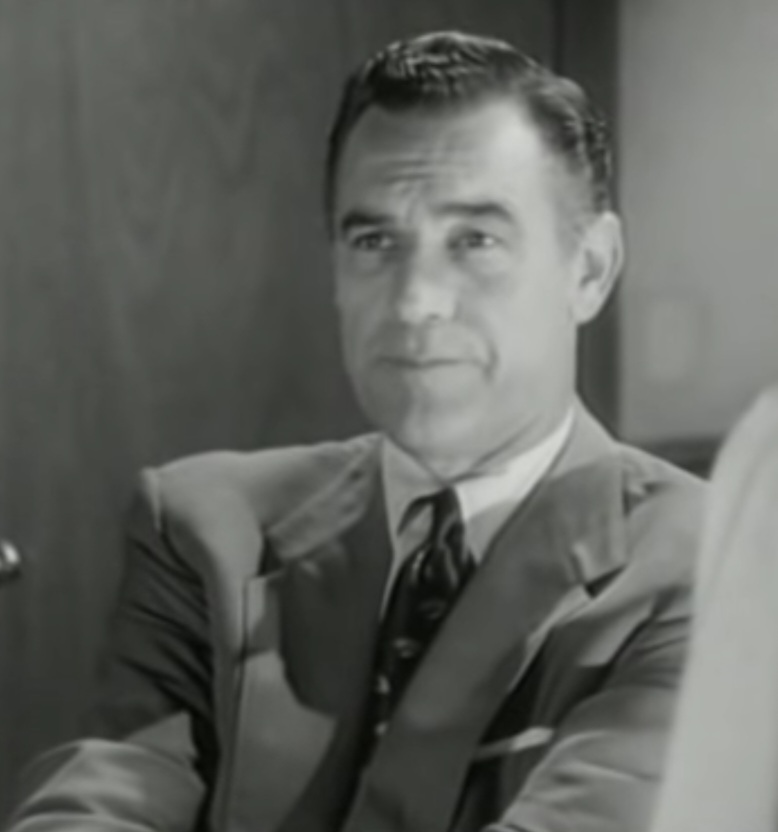
- Randall in Indestructible Man (1956)
- Born: Clarence W Maxwell; July 24, 1909; Brazil, Indiana, U.S.
- Died: June 22, 1988 (aged 78); San Bernardino, California. U.S.
- Occupation: Actor
- Years active: 1950–1971
- Television: Laramie; Cimarron City
- Spouse: Mary Elizabeth Adams Nov 20, 1942 - Feb 15, 1950 Rose C. Leone marriages date unknown. She remarried after S. Randall's death.

Stuart Randall (born Clarence W Maxwell, July 24, 1909 – June 22, 1988) was an American band leader, singer, thespian, and actor of film and television who appeared on screen between 1950 and 1971.

== Early years ==
Randall was born in Brazil, Indiana, the son of Walter C Maxwell and Allie Ball Maxwell. He attended Brazil High School. Before he became an actor, he sang with bands, including those of Jan Garber and Abe Lyman; led an orchestra; and was a radio technician. In World War II, Randall went through Army basic and AIT (field artillery) training at Camp Roberts in California. Afterwards, it has been said, he was an observer for the general staff of the U. S. Army's ground forces. In that role he completed 18 missions behind enemy lines in the European theater.

== Career ==
Randall portrayed sheriff Art Sampson on the television Western Cimarron City.

Randall portrayed Will Bradly on the television Western show, The Lone Ranger, in season 2, episode 10, “Masked Deputy.”

Randall also played Mort Cory, who was the sheriff on the TV Western Laramie.

== Personal life ==
Randall was married in the West Central Chapel, Camp Roberts, California to Mary E. Adams, a dancer and actress going by Angie Adams, on November 20, 1942 until February 15, 1950, at which time they divorced. They had two children. Later he married Rose C. Leone, May 8, 1954.

== Death ==
Randall died in 1988, aged 78, at his home in Victorville, San Bernardino County, California.

== Filmography ==
| Year | Title | Role | Notes |
|---|---|---|---|
| 1950 | Bells of Coronado | Sheriff | |
| 1950 | Dynamite Pass | Rancher Allen | Uncredited |
| 1950 | Rider from Tucson | Henchman Slim | |
| 1950 | Rustlers on Horseback | Jake Clune | |
| 1951 | Storm Warning | Walt Walters | |
| 1951 | Rough Riders of Durango | Henchman Jed | |
| 1951 | Tomahawk | Sergeant Newell | |
| 1951 | Wells Fargo Gunmaster | John Thornton | |
| 1951 | Inside the Walls of Folsom Prison | Jennings | Uncredited |
| 1951 | The Hoodlum | Lieut. Burdick | |
| 1951 | Tomorrow Is Another Day | Frank Higgins | |
| 1951 | Arizona Manhunt | Scar Willard | |
| 1951 | The Lady Pays Off | Face | Uncredited |
| 1951 | Fixed Bayonets! | Major General at Headquarters | Uncredited |
| 1952 | The Bushwackers | Slocum | |
| 1952 | This Woman Is Dangerous | Detective McGill | Uncredited |
| 1952 | Bugles in the Afternoon | Bannack Bill | |
| 1952 | Rancho Notorious | Starr | Uncredited |
| 1952 | Carbine Williams | Deputy Sheriff Tom Vennar | |
| 1952 | Kid Monk Baroni | Mr. Moore | |
| 1952 | The Pride of St. Louis | Frankie Frisch | Uncredited |
| 1952 | The Half-Breed | Hawkfeather | Uncredited |
| 1952 | Diplomatic Courier | Butrick | Uncredited |
| 1952 | O. Henry's Full House | Detective | (segment "The Clarion Call"), Uncredited |
| 1952 | Park Row | Mr. Spiro | |
| 1952 | Hurricane Smith | Matt Ward | |
| 1952 | Captive Women | Gordon | |
| 1952 | Pony Soldier | Standing Bear | |
| 1953 | Hiawatha | Mudjekeewis | |
| 1953 | Sword of Venus | Hugo | |
| 1953 | Destination Gobi | Capt. Briggs | Uncredited |
| 1953 | Pickup on South Street | Police Commissioner | Uncredited |
| 1953 | Pony Express | Pemberton | |
| 1953 | Arena | Eddie Elstead | |
| 1953 | Hannah Lee: An American Primitive | Jeff Montgomery | |
| 1953 | The Man from the Alamo | Jim Bowie | Uncredited |
| 1953 | Champ for a Day | Detective | Uncredited |
| 1953 | Vicki | Detective #3 | Uncredited |
| 1953 | Mexican Manhunt | Lucky Gato | |
| 1953 | Captain John Smith and Pocahontas | Opechanco | |
| 1954 | The Great Diamond Robbery | Nightclub Manager | Uncredited |
| 1954 | Southwest Passage | Lt. Owens | |
| 1954 | Man with the Steel Whip | Harris | |
| 1954 | The Far Country | Capt. Benson | Uncredited |
| 1954 | Naked Alibi | Chief A.S. Babcock | |
| 1954 | This Is My Love | Investigator | |
| 1954 | They Rode West | Chief Satanta | |
| 1955 | Chief Crazy Horse | Old Man Afraid | |
| 1955 | Female on the Beach | Frankovitch | |
| 1955 | Headline Hunters | Frank Hoffman | |
| 1955 | Texas Lady | Texas Ranger Capt. Irvine | Uncredited |
| 1956 | Indestructible Man | Police Capt. John Lauder | |
| 1956 | Star in the Dust | Jess Ryman | |
| 1956 | Pardners | Carol's Cowhand | |
| 1956 | Miami Exposé | 'Lucky' Gato | |
| 1956 | The Ten Commandments | Elder of Joseph | Uncredited |
| 1957 | Run of the Arrow | Col. Taylor | |
| 1957 | Official Detective | Butler | TV series, 1 episode |
| 1959 | Verboten! | Colonel | |
| 1959 | The Big Fisherman | King Aretas | |
| 1960 | I'll Give My Life | Rex Barton | |
| 1960 | Home from the Hill | Ben Ramsey | Uncredited |
| 1960 | The Gallant Hours | Vice Adm. Richmond Kelly Turner | Uncredited |
| 1960 | From the Terrace | Jerry Kelly | Uncredited |
| 1960 | College Confidential | Sheriff | Uncredited |
| 1960 | Wanted Dead or Alive (TV series) | Mr. Cummings | season 2 episode 26 (Black Belt) |
| 1961 | Wanted Dead or Alive (TV series) | Watkins | season 3 episode 15 (Baa-Baa) |
| 1961 | Frontier Uprising | Ben Wright | |
| 1961 | Posse from Hell | Luke Gorman | |
| 1963 | Lassie: A Christmas Tail | Al Livermore | |
| 1964 | Taggart | Sheriff | |
| 1965 | Fluffy | State Trooper | |
| 1969 | True Grit | McAlester | Uncredited |
