= Arizona Manhunt =

1951 film by Fred C. Brannon

- Directed by: Fred C. Brannon
- Written by: William Lively
- Produced by: Rudy Ralston
- Starring: Michael Chapin; Eilene Janssen; James Bell
- Cinematography: John MacBurnie
- Edited by: Irving M. Schoenberg
- Music by: Stanley Wilson
- Production company: Republic Pictures
- Distributed by: Republic Pictures
- Release date: September 15, 1951
- Running time: 60 minutes
- Country: United States
- Language: English

Arizona Manhunt is a 1951 American Western film directed by Fred C. Brannon and starring Michael Chapin, Eilene Janssen and James Bell.

The film's sets were designed by the art director Frank Hotaling.

== Cast ==
- Michael Chapin as 'Red' White
- Eilene Janssen as Judy Dawson
- James Bell as Sheriff Tom White
- Lucille Barkley as Clara Drummond
- Roy Barcroft as Pete Willard
- Hazel Shaw as Jane Rowan
- John Baer as Deputy Jim Brown
- Harry Harvey as Doctor Sawyer
- Stuart Randall as Scar Willard
- Ted Cooper as Henchman Charlie
- Roy Bucko as Townsman
- Herman Hack as Townsman
- Silver Harr as Henchman
- Wally West as Henchman

== Bibliography ==
- Bernard A. Drew. Motion Picture Series and Sequels: A Reference Guide. Routledge, 2013.
