= James Bell (actor) =

American actor (1891–1973)

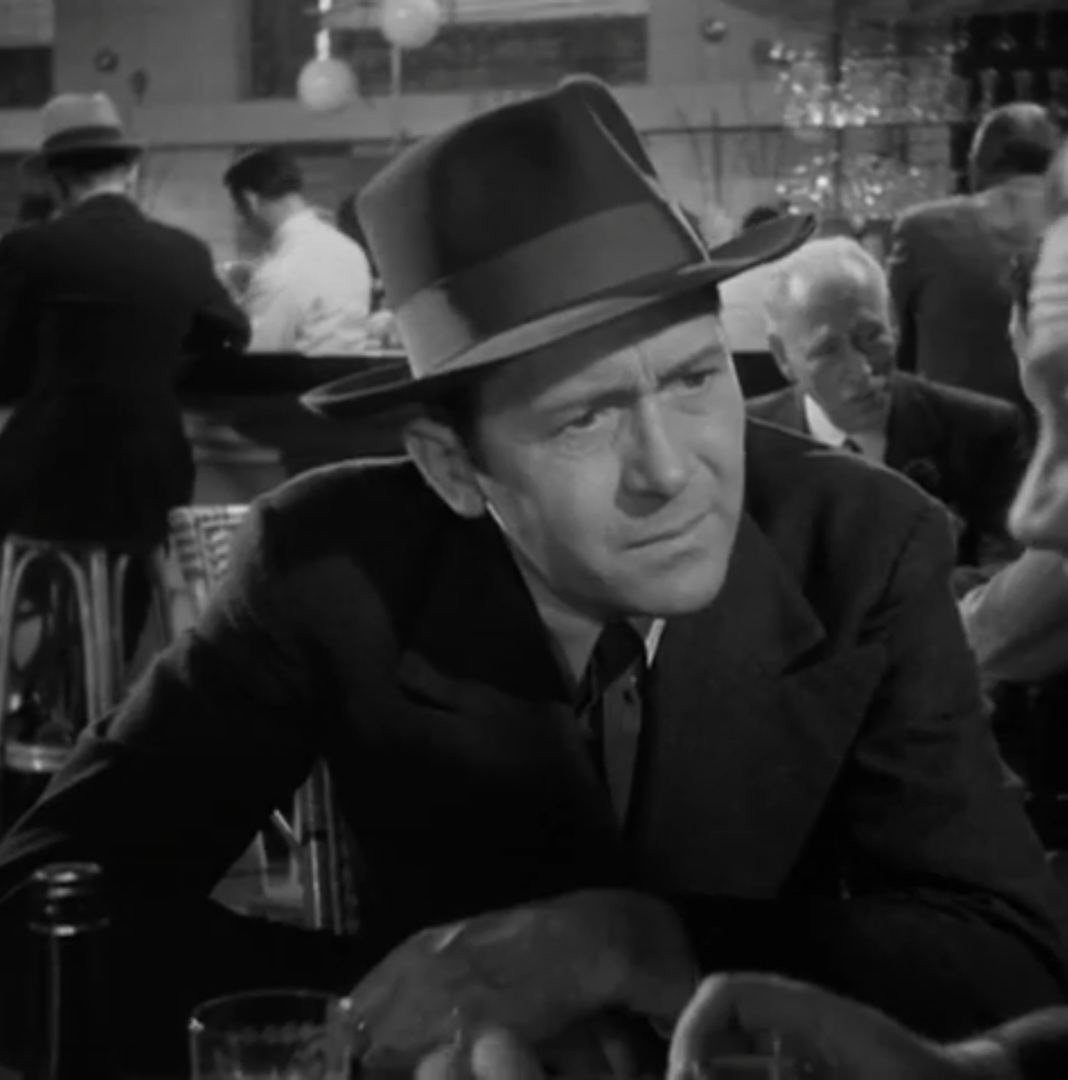
- Bell in Blood on the Sun (1945)
- Born: James Harlee Bell; December 1, 1891; Suffolk, Virginia, U.S.
- Died: October 26, 1973 (aged 81); Kents Store, Virginia, U.S.
- Education: Virginia Polytechnic Institute
- Occupation: Actor
- Years active: 1920–1964
- Spouse(s): Joyce Arling (1911-2002) (m. 1930-1973)

James Harlee Bell (December 1, 1891 – October 26, 1973) was an American film and stage actor who appeared in about 150 films and television shows through 1964.

Bell was born in Suffolk, Virginia, and graduated from Virginia Polytechnic Institute in 1911 with a degree in electrical engineering. In 1920, he made his theatrical debut as Venustiano in The Bad Man. He worked steadily on Broadway through 1941.

Bell's first film role was in I Am a Fugitive from a Chain Gang in 1932. He appeared in the films I Walked with a Zombie and The Leopard Man, both of which were directed by Jacques Tourneur, produced by Val Lewton, and released in 1943.

Among his television appearances were four guest roles on the legal drama series Perry Mason. In 1958, he played murder victim J.J. Stanley in the episode "The Case of the Green-Eyed Sister", and murderer P.E. Overbrook in "The Case of the Lazy Lover." In 1960, he played murderer Zack Davis in "The Case of the Frantic Flyer", and murder victim Silas Vance in "The Case of the Lavender Lipstick". That same year, Bell appeared as Dr. Malcolm Allen in the Western TV series Laramie, in the episode "Street of Hate".

== Broadway roles ==
- The Bad Man (1920) as Venustiano
- A Free Soul (1928) as Bill Wilfong
- Jarnegan (1928) as Jimmy Fallon
- Your Uncle Dudley (1933) as Robert Kirby
- Thunder on the Left (1933) as Martin
- The Last Mile (1930) as Richard Walters
- Kill That Story (1934) as Duke Devlin
- Tobacco Row as Lester

== Selected filmography ==
- I Am a Fugitive from a Chain Gang (1932) - Red (uncredited)
- The Monkey's Paw (1933) - Flute Player (uncredited)
- The King's Vacation (1933) - Anderson
- Infernal Machine (1933) - Spencer
- Private Detective 62 (1933) - Whitey
- Storm at Daybreak (1933) - Peter (uncredited)
- Day of Reckoning (1933) - Slim
- White Woman (1933) - Hambly
- Student Tour (1934) - Indian Fakir (uncredited)
- The Lives of a Bengal Lancer (1935) - Indian Officer (uncredited)
- Holiday Inn (1942) - Dunbar
- I Walked with a Zombie (1943) - Dr. Maxwell
- The Leopard Man (1943) - Dr. Galbraith
- My Friend Flicka (1943) - Gus
- So Proudly We Hail! (1943) - Colonel White
- Gangway for Tomorrow (1943) - Tom Burke
- I Love a Soldier (1944) - Williams
- Thunderhead, Son of Flicka (1945) - Gus
- Blood on the Sun (1945) - Charley Sprague
- The Girl of the Limberlost (1945) - Wesley Sinton
- The Spiral Staircase (1946) - Constable
- The Unknown (1946) - Edward Martin
- Dead Reckoning (1947) - Father Logan
- Blind Spot (1947) - Detective Lieutenant Fred Applegate
- The Sea of Grass (1947) - Sam Hall
- The Millerson Case (1947) - Walker Bell
- Brute Force (1947) - Crenshaw, Convict in Print Shop
- The Romance of Rosy Ridge (1947) - John Willhart
- Philo Vance's Secret Mission (1947) - Sheriff Harry Madison
- Driftwood (1947) - Sheriff Bolton
- Killer McCoy (1947) - Father Patrick Ryan
- I, Jane Doe (1948) - Judge Bertrand
- Black Eagle (1948) - Frank Hayden
- Sealed Verdict (1948) - Mr. Hockland
- Roughshod (1949) - Pa (Ed) Wyatt
- Streets of Laredo (1949) - Ike
- Dial 1119 (1950) - Harrison D. Barnes
- The Company She Keeps (1951) - Mr. Neeley
- Buckaroo Sheriff of Texas (1951) - Sheriff Tom White
- The Dakota Kid (1951) - Sheriff Tom White
- Flying Leathernecks (1951) - Colonel
- Arizona Manhunt (1951) - Sheriff Tom White
- Red Mountain (1951) - Dr. Terry
- Japanese War Bride (1952) - Ed Sterling
- Wild Horse Ambush (1952) - Sheriff Tom White
- Ride the Man Down (1952) - John Evarts
- Million Dollar Mermaid (1952) - Judge
- Hannah Lee: An American Primitive (1953) - Man at Carousel in Prologue (uncredited)
- The Last Posse (1953) - Will Romer
- Devil's Canyon (1953) - Dr. Betts
- Crime Wave (1953) - Daniel O'Keefe
- All the Brothers Were Valiant (1953) - Aaron Burnham
- The Glenn Miller Story (1954) - Mr. Burger
- Riding Shotgun (1954) - Doc Winkler
- About Mrs. Leslie (1954) - Mr. Herbert Poole
- Black Tuesday (1954) - John Norris
- Lassie (Jeff’s Collie) 1954 S1E5 “Mr. Peabody” Mr. Peabody
- Strategic Air Command (1955) - Reverend Dr. Thorne
- Marty (1955) - Mr. Snyder (uncredited)
- Lay That Rifle Down (1955) - Mr. Fetcher
- Sincerely Yours (1955) - Grandfather Hunt
- Texas Lady (1955) - Cass Gower
- A Lawless Street (1955) - Asaph Dean
- Tribute to a Bad Man (1956) - L.A. Peterson
- A Day of Fury (1956) - Doc Logan
- Huk! (1956) - Stephen Rogers
- The Search for Bridey Murphy (1956) - Hugh Lynn Cayce
- Four Girls in Town (1957) - Walter Conway
- The Lonely Man (1957) - Judge Hart
- Back from the Dead (1957) - Mr. Bradley
- Johnny Trouble (1957) - Reverend Harrington
- The Tin Star (1957) - Judge Thatcher
- In Love and War (1958) - Sidney Lenaine (uncredited)
- The Trap (1959) - Sourdough (uncredited)
- The Oregon Trail (1959) - Jeremiah Cooper
- -30- (1959) - Ben Quinn
- Alfred Hitchcock Presents (1960) (Season 5 Episode 37: "Escape to Sonoita") as Andy Davis
- Posse from Hell (1961) - Benson
- Claudelle Inglish (1961) - Josh
- Bonanza (1962, Episode: "The Jury") - Hjalmer Olson
- The Virginian (1963 episode "To Make This Place Remember") - Dr. David T. Harvey
- Twilight of Honor (1963) - Charles Crispin
- Where Love Has Gone (1964) - Judge, Divorce Court (uncredited) (final film role)
