= Wells Fargo Gunmaster =

1951 film by Philip Ford

- Directed by: Philip Ford
- Written by: M. Coates Webster
- Produced by: Gordon Kay
- Starring: Allan Lane; Mary Ellen Kay; Chubby Johnson
- Cinematography: John MacBurnie
- Edited by: Robert M. Leeds
- Music by: Stanley Wilson
- Production company: Republic Pictures
- Distributed by: Republic Pictures
- Release date: May 15, 1951
- Running time: 60 minutes
- Country: United States
- Language: English

Wells Fargo Gunmaster is a 1951 American Western film directed by Philip Ford and starring Allan Lane, Mary Ellen Kay and Chubby Johnson.

== Cast ==
- Allan Lane as Rocky Lane
- Black Jack as Black Jack
- Chubby Johnson as Skeeter Davis
- Mary Ellen Kay as Carol Hines
- Michael Chapin as Tommy Hines
- Roy Barcroft as Henchman Brick Mason
- Walter Reed as Ed Hines
- Stuart Randall as John Thornton
- William Bakewell as Charlie Lannon
- George Meeker as Roulette Croupier
- Anne O'Neal as Miss Feathergill
- James Craven as Mr. Mills, Wells Fargo Chief
- Forrest Taylor as Doctor
- Lee Roberts as Townsman
- Lane Bradford as Saloon Gunman
- Roy Bucko as Card-Player
- Jack Montgomery as Henchman
- Jack Perrin as Bartender
- Guy Teague as Man in Saloon

== Production ==
The film's sets were designed by the art director Frank Hotaling.

== Bibliography ==
- Pitts, Michael R. Western Movies: A Guide to 5,105 Feature Films.McFarland, 2012.
