= Wild Horse Ambush =

1952 film by Fred C. Brannon

- Directed by: Fred C. Brannon
- Screenplay by: William Lively
- Produced by: Rudy Ralston
- Starring: Michael Chapin; Eilene Janssen; James Bell; Richard Avonde; Roy Barcroft; Julian Rivero
- Cinematography: John MacBurnie
- Edited by: Harold Minter
- Music by: Stanley Wilson
- Production company: Republic Pictures
- Distributed by: Republic Pictures
- Release date: April 15, 1952
- Running time: 54 minutes
- Country: United States
- Language: English

Wild Horse Ambush is a 1952 American Western film directed by Fred C. Brannon and written by William Lively. The film stars Michael Chapin, Eilene Janssen, James Bell, Richard Avonde, Roy Barcroft and Julian Rivero. The film was released on April 15, 1952, by Republic Pictures.

== Cast ==
- Michael Chapin as Red White
- Eilene Janssen as Judy Dawson
- James Bell as Sheriff Tom White
- Richard Avonde as Jalisco
- Roy Barcroft as Big John Harkins
- Julian Rivero as Enrico Espinosa
- Movita Castaneda as Lita Espinosa
- Drake Smith as Henchman Mace Gary
- Scott Lee as Henchman Shorty
- Alex Montoya as Pedro
- John Daheim as Henchman Turk
- Ted Cooper as Spy
- Wayne Burson as Henchman Tom
