= The Search for Bridey Murphy =

1956 film by Noel Langley

- Film poster
- Directed by: Noel Langley
- Screenplay by: Noel Langley
- Based on: The Search for Bridey Murphy by Morey Bernstein
- Produced by: Pat Duggan
- Starring: Teresa Wright; Louis Hayward; Nancy Gates
- Cinematography: John F. Warren
- Edited by: Floyd Knudtson
- Music by: Roy Webb
- Production company: Paramount Pictures
- Distributed by: Paramount Pictures
- Release date: October 1, 1956
- Running time: 84 minutes
- Country: United States
- Language: English

The Search for Bridey Murphy is a 1956 American drama film written and directed by Noel Langley and starring Teresa Wright, Louis Hayward, and Nancy Gates. Based on the best-selling book by Morey Bernstein, the film tells the story of contemporary American woman Virginia Tighe (renamed Ruth Simmons in the film) who, while under Bernstein's hypnosis, reveals herself to have been Bridey Murphy, a 19th-century Irishwoman in a past life. The phenomenon experienced by Tighe was later explained as a case of cryptomnesia.

Released by Paramount Pictures in October 1956, The Search for Bridey Murphy was the only Hollywood film to be directed by Langley, who was better known as a screenwriter. It was part of a wave of films about reincarnation and hypnotism, which also included I've Lived Before (1956), The She-Creature (1956), and The Undead (1957).

Geoffrey O'Brien called The Search for Bridey Murphy a "glum and threadbare production" that flopped at the box office. The film also suffered commercially from an increased public skepticism that "highly impressionable subjects were so eager to please their hypnotists", the subjects would "ransack their unconscious minds for stray childhood memories and reassemble them into a more or less convincing former life."

== Cast ==
- Teresa Wright as Ruth Simmons
- Louis Hayward as Morey Bernstein
- Nancy Gates as Hazel Bernstein
- Kenneth Tobey as Rex Simmons
- Richard Anderson as Dr. Deering
- Tom McKee as Catlett
- Janet Riley as Lois Morgan
- Charles Boaz as Jerry Thomas
- Lawrence Fletcher as Cranmer
- Charles Maxwell as Father Bernard
- Walter Kingsford as Professor
- Noel Leslie as Edgar Cayce
- James Bell as Hugh Lynn Cayce
- Eilene Janssen as Bridey Murphy at Age 15
- Bradford Jackson as Brian MacCarthy at Age 17
- James Kirkwood as Brian MacCarthy at Age 68
- Hallene Hill as Bridey Murphy at Age 66
