= Lucille Barkley =

American actress (1924–1979)

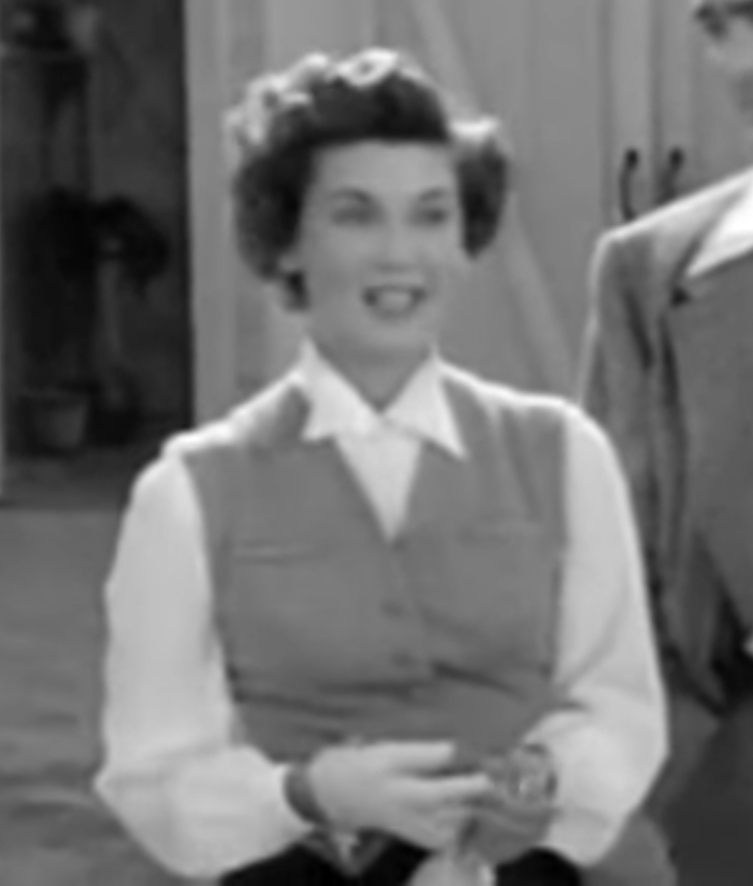
- Born: Lucille Oshinski; November 3, 1924; Pennsylvania, U.S.
- Died: August 11, 1979 (aged 54); Glendora, California, U.S.
- Occupation: Actress
- Years active: 1947–1955

Lucille Barkley (born Lucille Oshinski, November 3, 1924 – March 19, 1979) was an American film actress.

== Early years ==
The daughter of Florian and Verna Oshinski, Barkley was born in Pennsylvania but considered Rochester, New York, her hometown. She gained early acting experience with productions of the Rochester Community Players.

She left Rochester in 1948 to study at the American Academy of Dramatic Arts.

== Career ==
Barkley worked as a model with the Harry Conover agency.

She began her film career with Paramount Pictures, and after a year she signed with Universal-International.

In the mid-1950s, Barkley began acting on television, including one episode of the Abbott and Costello Show, entitled, "Efficiency Experts."

== Selected filmography ==
- The Big Clock (1948)
- The Great Plane Robbery (1950)
- Peggy (1950)
- The Desert Hawk (1950)
- The Fat Man (1951)
- Arizona Manhunt (1951)
- Bedtime for Bonzo (1951)
- Flight to Mars (1951)
- Angel Face (1953)
- Prisoners of the Casbah (1953)
- The Other Woman (1954)

== Bibliography ==
- Blottner, Gene. Columbia Noir: A Complete Filmography, 1940-1962. McFarland, 2015.
