= Buckaroo Sheriff of Texas =

1951 film

- Directed by: Philip Ford
- Written by: Arthur E. Orloff
- Produced by: Rudy Ralston
- Starring: Michael Chapin; Eilene Janssen; James Bell
- Cinematography: John MacBurnie
- Edited by: Arthur Roberts
- Music by: Stanley Wilson
- Production company: Republic Pictures
- Distributed by: Republic Pictures
- Release date: May 1, 1951
- Running time: 60 minutes
- Country: United States
- Language: English

Buckaroo Sheriff of Texas is a 1951 American Western film directed by Philip Ford and starring Michael Chapin, Eilene Janssen and James Bell.

The film's sets were designed by art director Frank Arrigo.

== Cast ==
- Michael Chapin as Red White
- Eilene Janssen as Judy Dawson
- James Bell as Sheriff Tom White
- Hugh O'Brian as Ted Gately
- Steve Pendleton as Sam White
- Tristram Coffin as Jim Tulane
- William Haade as Henchman Mark Brannigan
- Alice Kelley as Betty Dawson
- Selmer Jackson as Governor
- Ed Cassidy as Clint
- George Taylor as Governor's Secretary
- Steve Dunhill as Wagon Guard
- Billy Dix as Wagon Driver
- Eddie Dunn as Stage Driver
- Tommy Coats as Henchman
- Chick Hannan as Henchman
- Silver Harr as Henchman
- Cactus Mack as Henchman Mike
- Bob Reeves as Rancher

== Bibliography ==
- Pitts, Michael R. Western Movies: A Guide to 5,105 Feature Films. McFarland, 2012.
