= South of Caliente =

1951 film by William Witney

- Directed by: William Witney
- Written by: Eric Taylor
- Produced by: Edward J. White
- Starring: Roy Rogers; Dale Evans
- Cinematography: Jack A. Marta
- Edited by: Harold Minter
- Music by: R. Dale Butts
- Distributed by: Republic Pictures
- Release date: October 15, 1951
- Running time: 67 minutes
- Country: United States
- Language: English

South of Caliente is a 1951 American Western film directed by William Witney and starring Roy Rogers.

== Cast ==
- Roy Rogers as Himself
- Dale Evans as Doris Stewart
- Pinky Lee as Pinky
- Douglas Fowley as Dave Norris
- Ric Roman as Josef
- Leonard Penn as Captain
- Willie Best as Willie
