= The Dakota Kid =

1951 film by Philip Ford

- Directed by: Philip Ford
- Written by: William Lively
- Produced by: Rudy Ralston
- Starring: Michael Chapin; Eilene Janssen; James Bell
- Cinematography: John MacBurnie
- Edited by: Harry Keller
- Music by: Stanley Wilson
- Production company: Republic Pictures
- Distributed by: Republic Pictures
- Release date: July 1, 1951
- Running time: 60 minutes
- Country: United States
- Language: English
- Budget: $52,471

The Dakota Kid is a 1951 American Western film directed by Philip Ford and starring Michael Chapin, Eilene Janssen and James Bell.

The film's sets were designed by the art director Frank Hotaling.

== Cast ==
- Michael Chapin as Red White
- Eilene Janssen as Judy Dawson
- James Bell as Sheriff Tom White
- Danny Morton as Dakota Kid
- Margaret Field as Mary Lewis
- Robert Shayne as Ace Crandall
- Roy Barcroft as Henchman Turk Smith
- Mauritz Hugo as Squire Mason
- House Peters Jr. as Sam Dawson
- Lee Bennett as Cole White
- Mike Ragan as Messenger
- Ralph Bucko as Rancher
- Bob Burns as Man at Party
- Forrest Burns as Rancher
- Art Dillard as Henchman Jack Stoker
- Helen Gibson as Woman at Party
- Chick Hannan as Henchman
- Cactus Mack as Rancher

== Bibliography ==
- Pitts, Michael R. Western Movies: A Guide to 5,105 Feature Films. McFarland, 2012.
