= Lauren Chapin =

American actress (1945–2026)

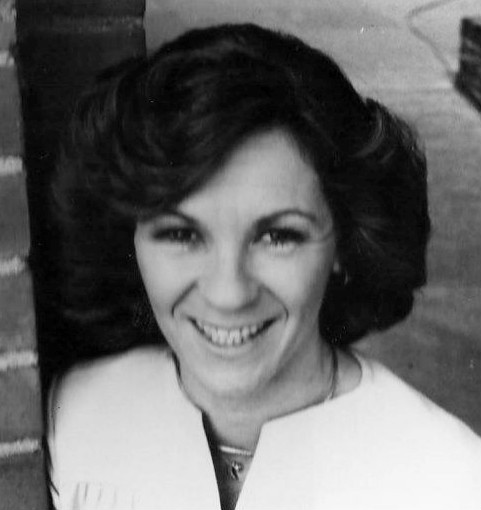
- Chapin in 1977
- Born: Lauren Ann Chapin; May 23, 1945; Los Angeles, California, U.S.
- Died: February 24, 2026 (aged 80); Miami, Florida, U.S.
- Occupation: Television actress
- Years active: 1952–2026
- Relatives: Billy Chapin (brother); Michael Chapin (brother)
- Website: laurenknowsbest.com

Lauren Ann Chapin (May 23, 1945 – February 24, 2026) was an American actress who played the role of the youngest child "Kathy Anderson" (nicknamed "Kitten") on the television show Father Knows Best. Between 1954 and 1960, she appeared in 196 of its 203 episodes.

== Early life ==
Chapin was born in Los Angeles to Roy Chapin, a bank manager, and Marquerite Alice (née Barringer), who later became a kind of personal coach for all of her children's acting careers.

Her brothers, Billy and Michael, were also child actors in the 1950s.

== Career ==
Chapin made her first TV appearance on the show "Lux Video Theater" in 1952. Two years later, she auditioned for "Father Knows Best" and won the part—she felt she beat out other girls because she resembled one of the real-life daughters of the show's star, Robert Young.

Chapin also had roles in A Star Is Born (1954), The Bob Hope Show (1954), The Ed Sullivan Show (1958), The Amorous Adventures of Don Quixote and Sancho Panza (1976), Scout's Honor (1980), the 36th Primetime Emmy Awards (1984), and School Bus Diaries (2016). She also appeared in two "Father Knows Best" reunions in 1977.

In the 1960s and 1970s, Chapin had problems with drugs and also sold them herself at one point. She claimed that she spent "several years in and out of prisons". Chapin rehabilitated and later made the troubled part of her life a subject in her autobiography.

Chapin also taught natural childbirth and worked for a brokerage firm. She later owned two beauty pageant enterprises.

In 1989, Chapin wrote a New York Times Best-Selling autobiography, Father Does Know Best: The Lauren Chapin Story. In 1999, she was the subject of the documentary "Lauren Chapin: The E! True Hollywood Story."

In the late 1980s while living in Texas with her son and daughter, Chapin managed actress Jennifer Love Hewitt, who was a friend of her daughter. Chapin brought both girls to Los Angeles, where they were signed by an agency. Chapin had second thoughts and withdrew her daughter. However, that move launched Hewitt's career.

== Death ==
Chapin died from cancer in Miami, Florida, on February 24, 2026, at the age of 80, after living with the cancer for 5 years. She was survived by her son and daughter. She was interred at Hollywood Forever Cemetery.
