= Michael Chapin =

American actor (born 1936)

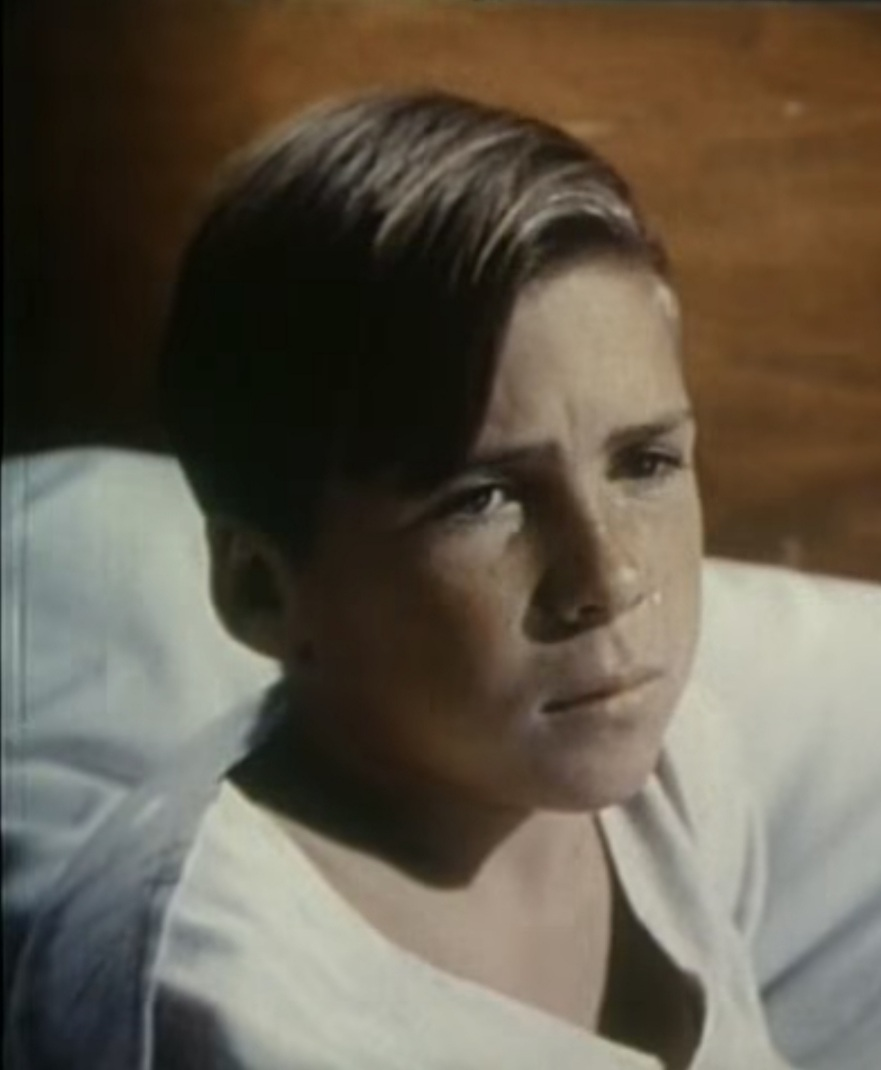
- Chapin in Under California Stars (1948)
- Born: July 25, 1936 (age 90); Los Angeles, California, U.S.
- Occupation: Actor
- Years active: 1944–1959
- Spouse: Carolyn Joyce Martin (m. 1966; died 2005)
- Children: 2
- Relatives: Billy Chapin (brother); Lauren Chapin (sister)

Michael Chapin (born July 25, 1936) is an American former child actor in film and television.

Born in Los Angeles, California, he began his screen career in 1944 when he appeared in The Fighting Sullivans. He continued with films such as It's a Wonderful Life and Under California Stars. Acting mostly in western pictures, he retired from show business in 1959.

Chapin is the older brother of Billy Chapin and Lauren Chapin.

== Filmography ==
Year	Title	Role	Notes
1944	The Fighting Sullivans	Rival boy	Uncredited
1946	Song of Arizona	Cyclops	
1946	Night Editor	Doc Cochrane, as a boy	Uncredited
1946	It's a Wonderful Life	Young George's friend	Uncredited
1947	Backlash	Mike	Uncredited
1947	The Farmer's Daughter	Boy	Uncredited
1947	Heaven Only Knows	Little boy	Uncredited
1948	Call Northside 777	Frank Wiecek, Jr.	Uncredited
1948	Under California Stars	Ted Carver	
1948	Night Wind	Vinnie Jardine	Uncredited
1949	Strange Bargain	Roddy Wilson	
1950	The Reformer and the Redhead	Orphan	Uncredited
1950	Summer Stock	Boy	Uncredited
1951	Buckaroo Sheriff of Texas	Red White	
1951	Wells Fargo Gunmaster	Tommy Hines	
1951	The Dakota Kid	Red White	
1951	Arizona Manhunt	Red White	
1952	Wild Horse Ambush	Red White	
1952	Wagons West	Ben Wilkins	
1952	Springfield Rifle	Jamie Kearney	Uncredited
1954	Pride of the Blue Grass	Danny	
1955	The Night of the Hunter	Ruby's boyfriend	Uncredited
