= Flight to Mars (film) =

1951 film by Lesley Selander

- Theatrical release poster
- Directed by: Lesley Selander
- Screenplay by: Arthur Strawn
- Produced by: Walter Mirisch
- Starring: Marguerite Chapman; Cameron Mitchell; Arthur Franz
- Cinematography: Harry Neumann
- Edited by: Richard Heermance
- Music by: Marlin Skiles
- Production company: Walter Mirisch Productions
- Distributed by: Monogram Distributing
- Release date: November 5, 1951 (Los Angeles)
- Running time: 72 minutes
- Country: United States
- Language: English

Flight to Mars is a 1951 American Cinecolor science-fiction drama film produced by Walter Mirisch, directed by Lesley Selander and starring Marguerite Chapman, Cameron Mitchell, Morris Ankrum and Arthur Franz. Special effects were handled by Jack Cosgrove, Irving Block and Jack Rabin. Edward Haworth was Production designer, David Milton was Art Director and Harry Neumann was the cinematographer.

The film's storyline involves the arrival on Mars of an American scientific expedition team who discover that Mars is inhabited by an underground-dwelling but dying civilization that appears to be humanoid. The Martians are suspicious of the men's motives. They keep their visitors as prisoners, never allowing them to return home with the information they have discovered. With the help of some sympathetic Martians, the men plan their escape.

== Plot ==
The first expedition to Mars, led by physicist Dr. Lane, includes Professor Jackson, engineer and spaceship designer Jim Barker and his assistant Carol Stafford, who earned her degree in spaceship engineering in only three years. Journalist Steve Abbott, a decorated war correspondent, is also aboard to cover the historic mission.

They lose contact with Earth when a meteor storm disables their landing gear and radio. The crew are forced to decide whether to land on Mars or turn back for Earth. They proceed with the mission, knowing that they may never return.

After they safely land, the crew are met by five Martians at one of their above-ground structures. In human form and able to communicate in English, Ikron, the president of their planetary council, explains that they learned Earth languages from broadcasts. Their own efforts to transmit messages to Earth have only resulted in the receipt of faint, unintelligible signals.

The Earth crew are taken to a vast underground city that is being sustained by life-support systems fueled by a mineral called corium, from which the Martians extract water and air and generate energy. While there, the crew meet Tillamar, a past president and now a trusted council advisor. Terris, a young female Martian, shows them to their room and serves them automated meals. The expedition members are amazed at the high level of Martian technology and ask the council for help with repairing their spaceship.

Ikron discreetly reveals that their corium supply is nearly depleted. He recommends that the men's spaceship, once repaired, be reproduced, thereby creating a fleet that can evacuate the Martians to Earth and saving the Martian species, but also enslaving the Terran species. The council votes to adopt Ikron's plan while also holding the men captive during the repair process. Alita, a leading Martian scientist, is placed in charge of the spaceship. Ikron uses Terris as a spy to keep himself informed of the progress.

Jim begins to suspect the Martians' motives and, with Alita's help, fakes an explosion aboard, slowing the repairs. When Jim later announces that their blastoff for Earth is set for the next day, he surprises everyone with the news that Tillamar and Alita will be joining them, with Alita to become his wife. Terris reports their suspicious behavior to Ikron, and Alita and Tillamar are then held, but Jim foils Ikron's plan to seize the repaired ship after freeing them. After a brief confrontation with Martian guards at the spaceship's gangway, they reach the ship safely and the expedition departs for Earth.

== Cast ==
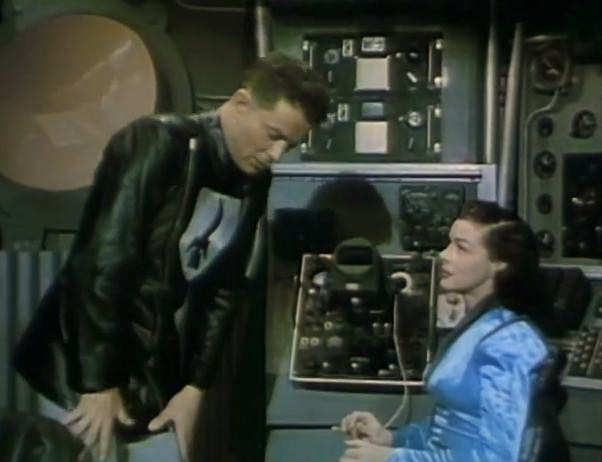
Arthur Franz (Dr. Jim Baker) and Marguerite Chapman (Alita) in the spaceship secuence

- Marguerite Chapman as Alita: A sympathetic Martian scientist who is assigned to work with the humans and ultimately decides to help them escape.
- Cameron Mitchell as Steve Abbott: A decorated war correspondent and newspaper journalist who tags along to cover the historic flight, as the film's protagonist.
- Arthur Franz as Dr. Jim Barker: The brilliant engineer and spaceship designer who leads the efforts to repair the ship.
- Virginia Huston as Carol Stafford: The capable engineer and Dr. Barker's assistant who holds a degree in spaceship engineering.
- John Litel as Dr. Lane: A senior scientist and core member of the Earth expedition.
- Morris Ankrum as Ikron: The leader of the Martian society ruling council who secretly plots to steal the Earth ship MARS-1 to launch an invasion.
- Richard Gaines as Professor William Jackson: An elder scholar scientist and key crew member on the mission.
- Lucille Barkley as Terris: An martian woman who interacts closely with the crew and becomes to Ikron's spy
- Robert Barrat as Tillamar: The martian society council advisor and Alita's father, who opposes Ikron's hostile plans and assists the humans.
- Trevor Bardette as Alzar: A Martian citizen who he appears saving Dr. Baker's life in a spaceship repair.
- Everett Glass as Montar: A Martian citizen and one for Ikron's guards.
- David Bond as Ramay: A martian resident technician and one for Ikron's guards.
- William Forrest as General Archer: the associate high-ranking military officer at The Pentagon headquarters overseeing the historic Earth space mission.
- Edward Earle as Justin: Dr. Lane's earth-side associate engenieer of the MARS rocket ship
- Tristram Coffin as the news commentator.

== Production ==
The plot of Flight to Mars bears some similarities with that of the Russian silent film Aelita, although Flight to Mars is a low-budget "quickie" shot in just five days.

The film's principal location photography took place in Death Valley, California from May 11 through late May 1951.

Except for some of the flight instruments, Flight to Mars reuses the interior flight deck sets, somewhat redressed, and other interior props from Lippert Pictures' 1950 science-fiction feature Rocketship X-M. The sound effects from Rocketship X-M are reused, as are the concepts of space flight. However, in Flight to Mars the flight to Mars is planned whereas in Rocketship X-M, the trip to Mars is accidental and occurs during a planned expedition to the Moon. Flight to Mars postulates a humanoid species that is in many ways superior to humans and may possibly pose a long-term, strategic threat. In Rocketship X-M, the Martians are the descendants of survivors of a nuclear holocaust that occurred millennia earlier, and they pose only an immediate, tactical threat to the RX-M's crew.

A sequel, Voyage to Venus, was proposed but never produced.

== Release ==
=== Home media ===
Flight to Mars was released on blu-ray by The Film Detective in 2021.

== Reception ==
In a contemporary review, the Los Angeles Times wrote: "Just how the people of Mars, if any, feel if they know what our pseudo-scientific films are saying about them cannot at present be known. But they might resent 'Flight to Mars,' since it makes them out a pretty mean lot."

Reviewer William Brogdon of Variety wrote: "Presentation is on a standard level, with stock situations and excitement, but physically film looks better than the usual light budgeted effort through a well-conceived production design that displays technical gadgets and settings nicely. Cinecolor hues also help values. Lesley Selander's direction of the Arthur Strawn screenplay keeps it moving along at a fairly good pace, although surfeit of dialog occasionally slows it down."

The Monthly Film Bulletin wrote: "A science fiction adventure on the comic strip level, with dialogue, playing and use of colour to match. The technical effects are poorly managed, with little attempt to sustain any illusion, and Mars itself looks like a futuristic Ideal Home Exhibition run up in cardboard."

== See also ==
- 1951 in film
- List of films set on Mars
- List of science-fiction films of the 1950s
- Mission to Mars, a 2000 film with a similar premise.
