= Frank Hotaling =

American art director

- Born: April 4, 1909; New York City, NY
- Died: April 13, 1977 (aged 68); Woodland Hills, Los Angeles, CA
- Occupation: art director
- Years active: 1944–1966
- Spouse: Nina Byron (m.1939)

Frank Hotaling (April 4, 1909 – April 13, 1977) was an American art director, born in New York City, whose career encompassed over 100 films, mostly B movies. His association with famed director John Ford led to an Oscar nomination, shared with John McCarthy Jr. and Charles S. Thompson, for Best Art Direction-Set Direction, Color, for 1952's The Quiet Man. This brought an upsurge in his film work and allowed Hotaling the opportunity to work on such A-list projects as Ford's The Searchers (1956), Delmer Daves' 3:10 to Yuma (1957), and William Wyler's The Big Country (1958).

Hotaling died in Woodland Hills, Los Angeles, California.

== Selected filmography ==
- Wyoming (1947)
- The Dakota Kid (1951)
