= Dear Ruth (film) =

1947 romantic comedy film directed by William D. Russell

- Movie poster
- Directed by: William D. Russell
- Written by: Arthur Sheekman
- Based on: Dear Ruth; 1944 play by Norman Krasna
- Produced by: Paul Jones
- Starring: Joan Caulfield; William Holden; Mona Freeman; Edward Arnold; Billy De Wolfe
- Cinematography: Ernest Laszlo
- Edited by: Archie Marshek
- Music by: Robert Emmett Dolan
- Production company: Paramount Pictures
- Distributed by: Paramount Pictures
- Release date: June 10, 1947
- Running time: 95 minutes
- Country: United States
- Language: English
- Box office: $3.8 million (US rentals)

Dear Ruth is a 1947 American romantic comedy film directed by William D. Russell, and starring Joan Caulfield, William Holden, Mona Freeman, Billy De Wolfe, and Edward Arnold. It was based on the 1944 Broadway play of the same name by Norman Krasna.

The film's plot concerns a teenage girl who uses her older sister's identity to communicate with a soldier pen pal.

Two sequels to Dear Ruth were later produced: Dear Wife (1949), with all of the principal actors reprising their roles, and Dear Brat (1951), featuring Freeman, Arnold and De Wolfe.

Despite the popular belief that J. D. Salinger based the name of his character Holden Caulfield, who appears in The Catcher in the Rye and other works, on a marquee for the film showing the last names of the film's two leads, the first Holden Caulfield story, "I'm Crazy", was published in December 1945, a year and a half before the film's release.

== Plot ==
Teenager Miriam Wilkins is an energetic activist during World War II. She blithely involves her family by enlisting them for causes without first gaining their consent. Her father Judge Wilkins and mother Edie are puzzled when Lieutenant William Seacroft, a complete stranger, appears at their home asking for their 22-year-old daughter Ruth. Bill has just returned from Italy, where he flew 25 missions over Germany as the bombardier of a B-26 bomber, but he has only two days of leave. He explains that he has been corresponding with their daughter and has fallen in love with her. He makes a favorable impression and promises to return later to meet her for the first time in person.

Ruth comes home and tells her parents that she is engaged to be married. They assume that she had encountered Bill, but she is engaged to her boyfriend Albert. They soon discover that Miriam had written Bill 60 letters but with her sister's name and photograph. Ruth wants to tell Bill the truth immediately, but when he arrives, she cannot bring herself to do so. When Albert arrives for a date with Ruth, she slips away with Bill so that she can tell him privately.

Bill takes Ruth to a play, dinner and dancing late into the night. Later, Ruth tells Albert that after Bill leaves for the Pacific, she will write to him and gently break off their relationship. She then reads the letters from Miriam.

The next morning, Ruth insists on taking Bill's young sister Martha out with them in order to keep Bill's amorous behavior in check, so Bill invites Albert along as well. Bill takes every opportunity to kiss Ruth, infuriating Albert. After Albert becomes separated from the group at a subway station, he is arrested when trying to enter another station without paying.

Martha arrives at the Wilkins residence with Bill's friend Sergeant Chuck Vincent. Martha had very recently broken off her relationship with Chuck, making for an awkward lunch. Bill and Ruth then appear and announce that they are engaged. When Bill leaves the room, Ruth reassures Albert that the ruse must only persist for a few more hours. However, Bill receives a telephone call informing him that he and Chuck will be instructors in Florida. Chuck and Martha reconcile and decide to be married, and Judge Wilkins conducts the ceremony.

Ruth tells Bill that she had only agreed to marry him because he was returning to combat. Miriam inadvertently reveals the whole truth to Bill, who accepts the situation, but after Martha and Chuck are married, Ruth has a change of heart. She and Bill are also married by her father before leaving for Florida. A sailor then appears, asking for Ruth, and a startled Miriam blurts out his name.

== Cast ==
- Joan Caulfield as Ruth Wilkins
- William Holden as Lt. William Seacroft
- Mona Freeman as Miriam Wilkins
- Edward Arnold as Judge Harry Wilkins
- Billy De Wolfe as Albert Kummer
- Mary Philips as Mrs. [Edie] Wilkins
- Virginia Welles as Martha Seacroft
- Kevin O’Morrison as Sgt. Chuck Vincent
- Marietta Canty as Dora [the Wilkins' maid]
- Irving Bacon as Delivery Man

== Production ==
Norman Krasna's play Dear Ruth had been hugely popular on Broadway. Film rights were sold to Paramount in February 1945 for a reported $450,000 but with the proviso that a film not be produced until the play had finished a two-year run. The amount was the highest that Paramount had ever paid for a property, exceeding the $283,000 paid for the film rights to Lady in the Dark. Studio executive Henry Ginsberg announced the male lead as Sonny Tufts and that Ruth would be played by Joan Caulfield or Paulette Goddard, while Miriam would be played by Diana Lynn or Mona Freeman.

In March 1946, Paramount announced the film as part of its slate for the following year. The husband-and-wife writing team of Albert and Frances Hackett was assigned the script.

The same year in July, Caulfield and William Holden were cast as the leads and Edward Arnold joined the cast. It was Holden's first film since his military duty had ended in November 1945. Filming was set to begin in August with Sidney Lanfield directing and Paul Jones producing. In addition to the Hacketts, Arthur Sheekman had worked on the script.

Lanfield became ill and was replaced by William D. Russell. Mona Freeman had tested for her role several times, but Lanfield did not want her. However, when Russell came on as director, Freeman was added to the cast in August.

=== Lawsuit ===
Columbia Pictures sued Krasna and the filmmakers for plagiarism, claiming that the story infringed the copyright of "Dear Mr. Private", a story that they intended to film with Lee Bowman. Columbia was unsuccessful, appealed the decision and lost the appeal.

== Reception ==
=== Critical ===
Bosley Crowther praised the film in The New York Times, calling it "one of those simon-pure excursions in fun, which bubbles and sparkles its way into your heart and completely disarms any resistance which an unadorned outline of its conventional plot might invoke" and noting that "the pace never drags, even though the slim story is stretched out over ninety minutes".

=== Box office ===
The film was successful at the box office, earning almost $4 million during its first year of release in North America.

== Sequels ==
Paramount purchased the rights to use the characters again. A sequel, Dear Wife, was released in 1949. This was followed in 1951 with Dear Brat, the final installment in the series.
