= Richard Webb (actor) =

American actor (1915–1993)

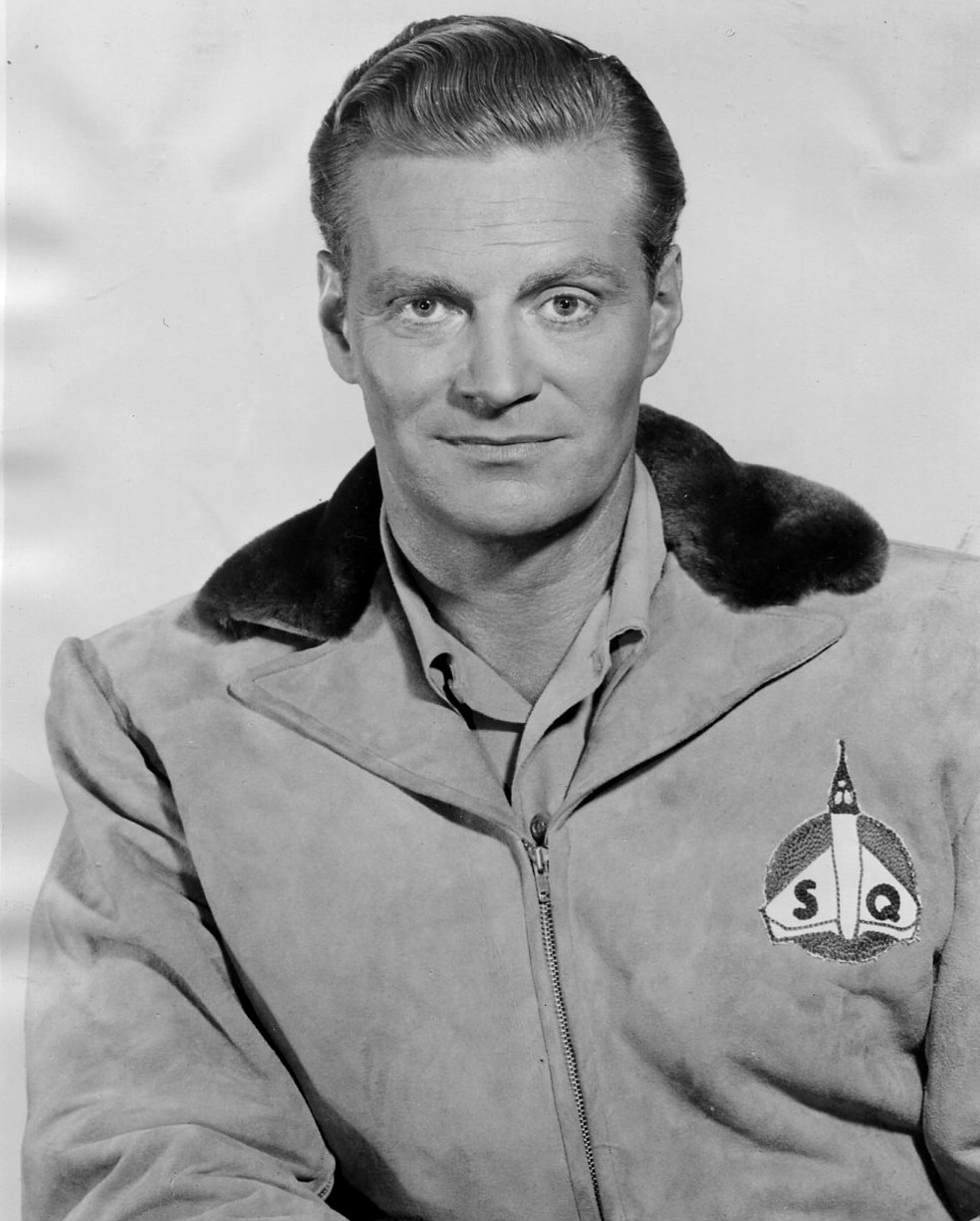
- Webb as Captain Midnight (1954)
- Born: John Richard Webb; September 9, 1915; Bloomington, Illinois, U.S.
- Died: June 10, 1993 (aged 77); Van Nuys, California, U.S.
- Occupation: Actor
- Years active: 1941–1979
- Spouses: Elizabeth Sterns (m. 1942, divorced): Florence Webb
- Children: 4

John Richard Webb (September 9, 1915 – June 10, 1993) was an American film, television and radio actor. He appeared in more than fifty films, including many westerns and films noir including Out of the Past (1947), Night Has a Thousand Eyes (1948), I Was a Communist for the FBI (1951) and Carson City (1952). In modern audiences, he may be best remembered as the star of the 1950s television series, Captain Midnight (Jet Jackson, Flying Commando in syndication), based on a long-running radio program of the same name and Border Patrol.

== Early years ==
Leaving Brown University theological school in 1936 when he realized he was not meant to be a Methodist minister, Webb enlisted in the United States Army and was stationed with the 1st Coast Artillery Regiment in Panama for three years when he decided to go to Hollywood attending the Bliss Hayden School of Acting.

== Career ==
=== 1940s ===
Webb was discovered by Paramount Pictures in 1940 where he was soon engaged as a contract player appearing in such films as I Wanted Wings, Sullivan's Travels and This Gun for Hire . During World War II he reenlisted at Fort Ord in 1942, then was commissioned in the US Army at Fort Benning ending the war as a captain; he remained in the Army Reserve rising to the rank of Major. Four months after leaving the Army he was back at Paramount in O.S.S.. After leaving Paramount Webb was originally offered a leading role in Sands of Iwo Jima. After receiving his salary and costume he was told that "powers that be" wished John Agar in the role and asked him if he would like another part in the film, that Webb accepted.

=== 1950s ===
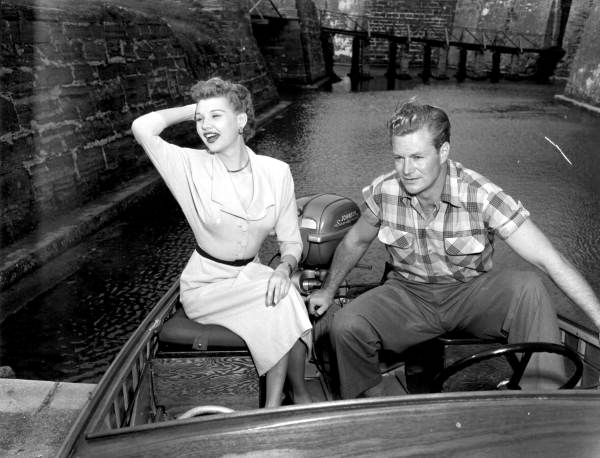
Richard Webb with Mari Aldon at the Florida premiere of Distant Drums (1951)

In 1951, Webb was contracted to Warner Bros where he played in I Was a Communist for the FBI then appeared along with Gary Cooper in the "Florida Western" Distant Drums. In 1957, Webb played Ben Maxwell in the episode "The Long Hunt" of the TV series Maverick. In 1958, Webb appeared in the episode "Wheel of Fortune" of the NBC western series, Jefferson Drum. Webb in 1958 played the role of Rocky Norton in the episode "Dead Reckoning" of the ABC/Warner Bros. western series, Colt .45.

=== 1960s ===
In 1960, Webb shot an unsuccessful television pilot for a spy series with Mark Damon, called Calling CQ.

In the same year he was cast as Clay in the episode "Calico" of another ABC/WB western series, The Alaskans then played imposter Henry Walker on CBS's Rawhide in the episode "Incident of the Stargazer". He was also cast in an episode of the 1960 CBS sitcom, My Sister Eileen.

In still another 1960 role, Webb was cast as Thomas Francis Meagher in the 1960 episode "The General Who Disappeared" on the syndicated television anthology series, Death Valley Days. In a 1963 appearance, Webb was cast as Caleb in the Death Valley Days episode, "The Peacemaker".

In 1963, Webb also portrayed George C. Belter, the murdered owner of Spicy Bits, a gossip magazine, in the Perry Mason episode, "The Case of the Velvet Claws. In 1965, Webb again played the murder victim on Perry Mason, this time as Addison Powell in "The Case of the Impetuous Imp."

In 1966 Webb played greedy Furrier “Aaron Tigue” in S11E29's “The Treasure of John Walking Fox” on Gunsmoke. Webb played Lieutenant Commander Ben Finney in an episode of Star Trek: The Original Series ("Court Martial", 1967). In the 1970s, Webb became a writer and published four books on psychic phenomena.

=== Writing ===
Webb wrote four books, Great Ghosts of the West, Voices From Another World and These Came Back, about psychic phenomena and the occult, and The Laughs on Hollywood, a collection of anecdotes about the entertainment industry.

== Death ==
Hindered by a long-term respiratory illness, Webb died of a self-inflicted gunshot on June 10, 1993, in Van Nuys, California.

== Selected filmography ==
- Rancho Grande (1940) - Steve - Ranch Guest (uncredited)
- I Wanted Wings (1941) - Cadet Captain
- West Point Widow (1941) - Intern (uncredited)
- Hold Back the Dawn (1941) - Movie Actor in Role of Jeff (uncredited)
- Sullivan's Travels (1941) - Radio Man
- Among the Living (1941) - Hotel Clerk (uncredited)
- Pacific Blackout (1941) - Interne (uncredited)
- The Lady Has Plans (1942) - Pan Am Information Clerk (uncredited)
- The Remarkable Andrew (1942) - Randall Stevens
- This Gun for Hire (1942) - Young Man (uncredited)
- Night in New Orleans (1942) - Newspaper Photographer (uncredited)
- American Empire (1942) - Crane
- O.S.S. (1946) - Partker
- Variety Girl (1947) - Soldier
- Out of the Past (1947) - Jim
- The Big Clock (1948) - Nat Sperling
- My Own True Love (1948) - Corporal
- Night Has a Thousand Eyes (1948) - Peter Vinson
- Isn't It Romantic (1948) - Benjamin Logan
- Bride of Vengeance (1949) - Prisoner (uncredited)
- A Connecticut Yankee in King Arthur's Court (1949) - Sir Galahad
- Sands of Iwo Jima (1949) - Pfc. 'Handsome' Dan Shipley
- The Invisible Monster (1950, Serial) - Lane Carson
- I Was a Communist for the FBI (1951) - Ken Crowley
- Starlift (1951) - Col. Callan
- Distant Drums (1951) - Lt. Richard Tufts
- This Woman Is Dangerous (1952) - Franklin
- Mara Maru (1952) - Andy Callahan
- Carson City (1952) - Alan Kincaid
- The Nebraskan (1953) - Ace Elliott
- Jubilee Trail (1954) - Capt. Brown
- Prince Valiant (1954) - Sir Galahad (uncredited)
- The Black Dakotas (1954) - Frank Gibbs
- Three Hours to Kill (1954) - Carter Mastin
- A Star Is Born (1954) - Wallace (uncredited)
- Count Three and Pray (1955) - Big
- Artists and Models (1955) - Secret Service Agent Peters
- The Phantom Stagecoach (1957) - Tom Bradley
- Town Tamer (1965) - Kevin
- Git! (1965) - Andrew Garrett
- The Cat (1966) - Sheriff Vern
- Hillbillys in a Haunted House (1967) - Agent Jim Meadows
- The Gay Deceivers (1969) - Mr. Devlin
- Beware! The Blob (1972) - Sheriff Jones
- Never the Twain (1974) - Himself
- Mule Feathers (1977) - One-Eye (final film role)

== Television ==
Year	Title	Role	Notes
1960	Rawhide	Henry Walker	S2:E23, "Incident of the Stargazer"
1961	Rawhide	Paul Morgan	S4:E9, "The Little Fishes"
1967	Star Trek	Lt. Cdr. Ben Finney	S1:E20, "Court Martial"
