= Mary Philips =

American actress (1901–1975)

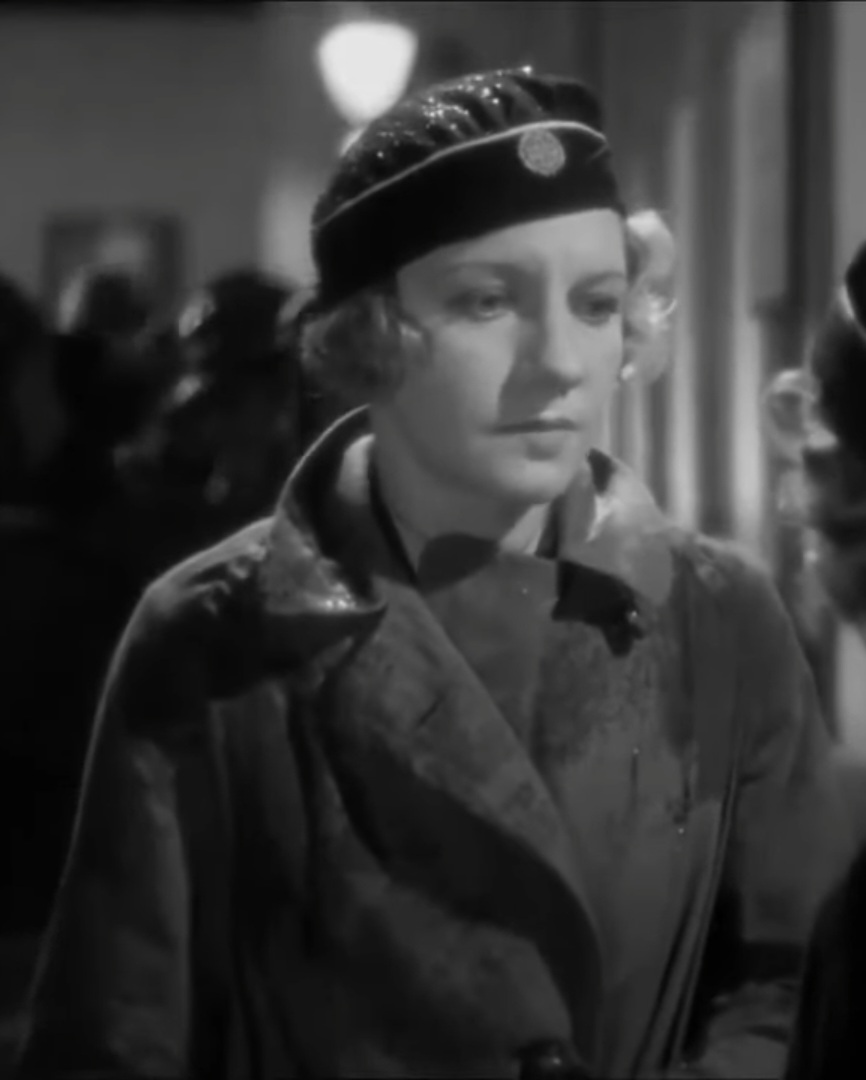
- Phillips in A Farewell to Arms (1932)
- Born: January 23, 1901; New London, Connecticut, U.S.
- Died: April 22, 1975 (aged 74); Santa Monica, California, U.S.
- Resting place: Forest Lawn Memorial Park, Glendale, California
- Occupation: Actress
- Years active: 1918–1954
- Spouses: Humphrey Bogart (m. 1928; div. 1937) Kenneth MacKenna (m. 1938; died 1962)

Mary Philips (January 23, 1901 – April 22, 1975) was an American stage and film actress.

== Biography ==
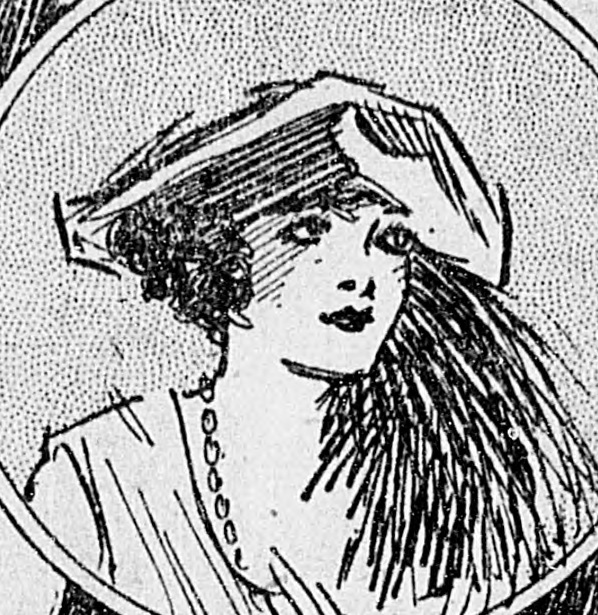
Drawing of Mary Philips from a 1922 newspaper.

Philips was born in New London, Connecticut, and she was educated at a New Haven convent. She was a chorus girl in her debut on Broadway. During her stage career, she appeared in such shows as The Postman Always Rings Twice (1936) and Chicken Every Sunday (1944). She had a long working relationship with the New York theatre and as her own personal scrapbook shows, worked closely with such individuals as George M. Cohan. In 1924 she appeared in the Broadway play Nerves with Humphrey Bogart and Kenneth MacKenna, both lifelong friends and future husbands.

Philips's career would later expand into films. One of her fondest memories was the role she played as Helen Ferguson in A Farewell to Arms (1932). She had featured roles in the films Leave Her to Heaven (1945), Dear Ruth (1947) and A Woman's Secret (1949).

== Personal life ==
Philips married Humphrey Bogart on April 3, 1928, at her mother's apartment at 24 Hopkins Street in Hartford, Connecticut, by a Justice of the Peace. This was Philips's first marriage and Bogart's second. He was then a little-known stage actor, and she was an established actress in the New York theatre. When Bogart began to gain film roles in Hollywood, Philips declined to move with him to California, as her stage career was firmly established in New York. Philips and Bogart divorced in 1938 after ten years. The couple had no children, but remained on good terms. Philips and her second husband attended Bogart's memorial in California following his death in 1957.

Continuing with her stage career in New York, Philips then went on to marry her longtime friend, actor and director Kenneth MacKenna (August 19, 1899 – January 15, 1962), an American actor and film director, born Leo Mielziner, Jr. in Canterbury, New Hampshire, brother of five-time Tony winner, Jo Mielziner. The couple were married in August 1938; it was the second and final marriage for both. They later made their home in California, where Kenneth worked for MGM. They remained married until MacKenna's death in 1962.

During the later days of MacKenna's life, both Philips's mother and Kenneth's mother lived with them in their home in Brentwood. Following the deaths of her husband and her mother, Philips moved to an apartment in Santa Monica. She was generous to her extended family, and both she and Kenneth made major contributions to charitable organizations, colleges and to the arts.

== Death ==
Philips died at St. John's Hospital in Santa Monica, California, on April 22, 1975, aged 74, after suffering from a lengthy period of lung cancer. She had been unaware of the growing cancer until she was in a minor car accident in Santa Monica that resulted in follow-up diagnostics and treatment.

Philips's cousin Lucille Hackett of New Haven arranged for her own daughter, Deborah Hackett, to be with her in Santa Monica during her final months. Philips was godmother to the children of the Hackett family, sending them to camp in the summer time and visiting them in New England and in Dobbs Ferry, New York.

Philips's relationship with Hackett was one of long affection and care that spanned their lives. Hackett was heir to Philips's estate (and after her death to the estate of her husband, Kenneth MacKenna, as well). (Lucille and her children were a reliable source for much of the personal information contained in this biography).

Philips' ashes share a niche with those of her husband, Kenneth MacKenna, at Forest Lawn Memorial Park, Glendale.

== Broadway credits ==
- The Canary (1918)
- Poor Little Ritz Girl (1920)
- Lilies of the Field (1921)
- Pins and Needles (1922)
- The Old Soak (1922)
- Nerves (1924)
- Big Boy (1925)
- One of the Family (1925)
- Two Girls Wanted (1926)
- Gay Paree (1926)
- The Wisdom Tooth (1926)
- The Five O'Clock Girl (1927)
- Skyrocket (1929)
- Gambling (1929)
- The Tavern (1930)
- The Song and Dance Man (1930)
- Oh, Promise Me (1930)
- The House Beautiful (1930)
- The Laugh Parade (1931)
- Black Sheep (1932)
- Both Your Houses (1933)
- All Good Americans (1933)
- The Pure in Heart (1934)
- Come What May (1934)
- Merrily We Roll Along (1934)
- Anything Goes (1934)
- A Touch of Brimstone (1934)
- The Postman Always Rings Twice (1936)
- The Show is On (1936)
- Spring Thaw (1938)
- Chicken Every Sunday (1944)

== Filmography ==
- Broadway's Like That (1930, Short) - Ruth's Fiancé's Wife
- Life Begins (1932) - Miss Pinty (uncredited)
- A Farewell to Arms (1932) - Ferguson
- As Good as Married (1937) - Laura
- Wings Over Honolulu (1937) - Hattie Penletter
- That Certain Woman (1937) - Amy
- The Bride Wore Red (1937) - Maria
- Mannequin (1937) - Beryl
- Lady in the Dark (1944) - Maggie Grant
- Captain Eddie (1945) - Elsie Rickenbacker
- Incendiary Blonde (1945) - Bessie Guinan
- Kiss and Tell (1945) - Dorothy Pringle
- Leave Her to Heaven (1945) - Mrs. Berent
- Dear Ruth (1947) - Mrs. Edie Wilkins
- A Woman's Secret (1949) - Mary Fowler
- The Life of Riley (1949) - Girl (uncredited)
- Dear Wife (1949) - Mrs. Wilkins
- I Can Get It for You Wholesale (1951) - Mrs. Boyd
- Dear Brat (1951) - Mrs. Wilkins
- Lights Out (1952, Episode: "The Red Rose")
- Geraldine (1953) - Cheerleader (uncredited)
- Prince Valiant (1954) - Queen of Thule
