= Isn't It Romantic (1948 film) =

1948 film by Norman Z. McLeod

- Theatrical poster
- Directed by: Norman Z. McLeod
- Written by: Richard L. Breen; Josef Mischel; Theodore Strauss
- Based on: Gather Ye Rosebuds, novel by Jeannette C. Nolan
- Produced by: Daniel Dare
- Starring: Veronica Lake; Billy De Wolfe; Mona Freeman; Richard Webb; Pearl Bailey
- Cinematography: Lionel Lindon
- Edited by: LeRoy Stone
- Music by: Joseph J. Lilley
- Distributed by: Paramount Pictures
- Release date: October 6, 1948
- Running time: 87 minutes
- Country: United States
- Language: English

Isn't It Romantic is a 1948 American black-and-white comedy musical film from Paramount Pictures, directed by Norman Z. McLeod and starring Veronica Lake and Billy De Wolfe. Supporting actors included Mona Freeman, Richard Webb and Pearl Bailey. Although it takes its title from a 1932 song by Richard Rodgers and Lorenz Hart, it is based on a novel called Gather Ye Rosebuds by Jeannette C. Nolan.

The plot of Isn't It Romantic is set in Indiana after the Civil War and is about three daughters courted by three young men.

== Plot ==
Major Euclid Cameron, an officer of the Confederate Army during the Civil War, writes his memoirs about the hardships of battle right after the war. It is set in Indiana, 1910, and the Major's finances are not in order. Cameron's daughters, Candy, Susie, and Rose, urge him to get a job so they can pay the family's debts. The strongheaded Major refuses, taking pride in the fact that no Cameron has ever had a decent job. He talks himself out of a job offer from a banker in town, Clarissa Thayer, a single woman who has always found him attractive.

The romantic Candy is in town with her fiancé Horace Frazier, but her flirtatious behaviour angers Horace. Candy's talking to complete strangers leads her into the clutches of swindler Richard "Rick" Brannon. Horace believes he recalls Rick from his days at music school back in the day, and invites him to the engagement party for Cameron's daughter Rose and Ben Logan, the son of Judge Thomas Logan. The Judge and the Major are old friends, and at the party they start arguing about the Civil War. At the party, Rick flirts with Rose in front of everyone, and the party breaks up when a fight starts between Rose and Ben.

Rick continues his inappropriate siege by sending Candy a box of flowers and silk stockings the next day. When the Major finds out he is outraged, but soon calms down when he hears about an investment opportunity from Rick. The Major is persuaded to line up as an investor in an oil drilling enterprise in Arkansas.

The same day Susie, Candy, Horace, and Ben go to a movie together, but are forced to leave the theatre after Ben gets into a fight. Upon their return, Ben reconciles with Rose as they go on a picnic together. The Judge then agrees to throw another engagement party for the couple, since the first one went badly.

The unsuspecting Candy eventually falls for Rick's charms, and the Major agrees to collect $3500 from his acquaintances to support Rick's business enterprise. After he has given the money to Rick, he learns that the Judge suspects Rick of being a swindler. On the night of the second engagement party, before the Major has time to react, Rick has left town with the money. Candy has left a note saying she has eloped with Rick. The party is once again interrupted as Ben and Horace go after the train on which Rick and Candy are traveling.

Ben and Horace manage to stop the train by starting a fire on the tracks. They discover Candy and Rick together, arguing as Candy tries to take back the stolen money. Ben knocks Rick unconscious, and the three return home with the money leaving Rick behind. They manage to get back before word gets out that the Major was swindled.

== Cast ==
- Veronica Lake as Candy
- Mona Freeman as Susie
- Mary Hatcher as Rose
- Billy De Wolfe as Horace Frazier
- Roland Culver as Maj. Euclid Cameron
- Patric Knowles as Richard "Rick" Brannon
- Richard Webb as Benjamin Logan
- Pearl Bailey as Addie
- Charles Evans as Judge Thomas Logan
- Larry Olsen as Hannibal
- Kathryn Givney as Clarissa Thayer
- Jeff York as Burly gent
- Hall Bartlett as Carter Dixon (Note: Isn't It Romantic marked the acting debut of the future director/producer.)

== Production ==
Jeannette Nolan based her novel on her childhood in Evansville, Indiana. It was published in 1946. The Los Angeles Times called the book "diverting... pleasant reading." The New York Times said "Mrs Nolan writes with affection for her tintype characters... but there is more affection than artistry here... The plot is too neat... The characters are... standardized and never achieve reality."

Paramount bought the film rights in May 1946 as a vehicle for Mary Hatcher. It was always intended to be a musical. Josef Mischel and Theodore Strauss were assigned to write the script by producer Daniel Dare. Veronica Lake and Mona Freeman were to co-star opposite Hatcher. The original title was Father's Day and William Russell was to direct. The title was changed to It's Always Spring and Norman Z. McLeod was signed to direct instead.

== Reception ==
In his review for The New York Times, film critic Bosley Crowther was merciless. "A formless and rambling musical, which looks as though it were made with at least a half dozen previous musical successes in mind, is Paramount's 'Isn't It Romantic?' which came to the Paramount Theatre yesterday. The funny thing is it bears no likeness to a musical success itself."

Isn't It Romantic is notable for receiving the shortest review ever given to a motion picture, according to Guinness World Records. When reviewing Isn't It Romantic in his book Leonard Maltin's Movie Guide, film critic Leonard Maltin simply replied to the film's title with "No".

Diabolique magazine called the film an "abysmal... load of old codswallop... These sorts of movies are hard to pull off for directors – Henry King and John Ford could do it, but it's beyond Norman McLeod here. Lake seems awkward. Maybe with color and more elaborate musical numbers it might have gone over. But it doesn't."
