= Billy De Wolfe =

American actor (1905–1974)

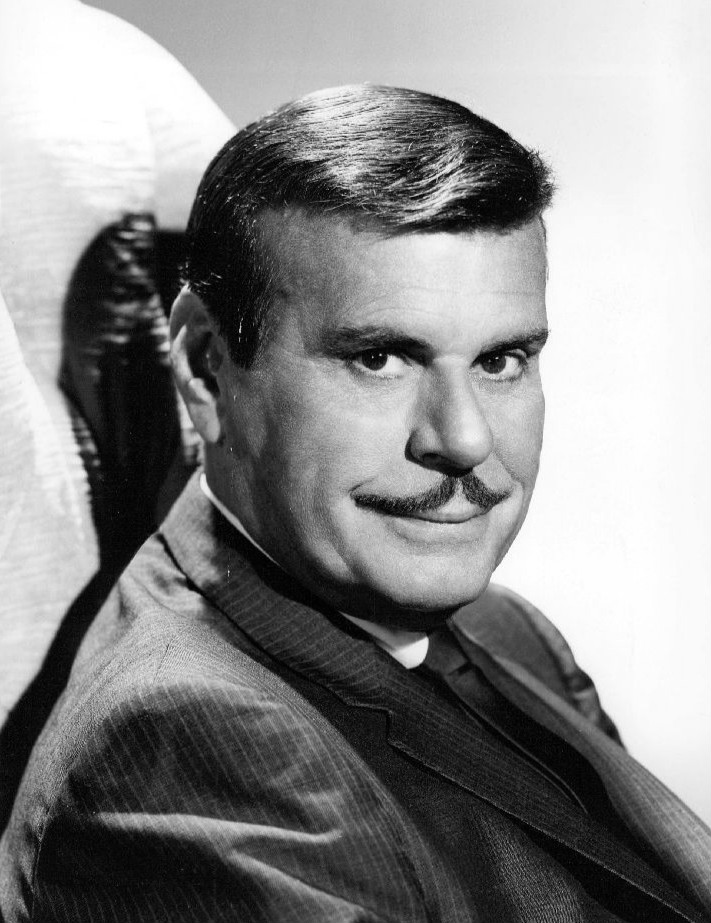
- De Wolfe as the radio station manager in Good Morning World, 1967
- Born: William Andrew Jones; February 18, 1907; Quincy, Massachusetts, U.S.
- Died: March 5, 1974 (aged 67); Los Angeles, California, U.S.
- Resting place: Mount Wollaston Cemetery, Quincy, Massachusetts; GPS (lat/lon): 42.25755, -70.99756
- Occupation: Actor
- Years active: 1925–1974

William Andrew Jones (February 18, 1907 – March 5, 1974), better known as Billy De Wolfe, was an American character actor. He was active in films from the mid-1940s until his death in 1974.

== Early life and early stage career ==
Born William Andrew Jones in the Wollaston neighborhood of Quincy, Massachusetts, De Wolfe was the son of a Welsh bookbinder who encouraged him to become a Baptist minister. Instead, Billy developed an interest in the theatre. He found work as an usher before becoming a dancer with the Jimmy O'Connor Band. It was at this point that he changed his last name initially to "De Wolf" (the "e" was added later), which was the last name of the manager of the Massachusetts theatre where he worked. In 1925, De Wolfe landed chorus boy spots in the Broadway musicals Artists and Models and The Cocoanuts. He then went on to tour Europe with a dance team for most of the 1930s, appearing in a London revue called "Revels in Rhythm" and "danced before royalty on nine continents." During World War II, he served in the U.S. Navy until he was discharged in 1944 for medical reasons, due to a reported arthritic condition.

== Films ==
De Wolfe signed with Paramount Pictures in 1943 and became a reliable comedian. His pencil-mustached and often pompous character contrasted humorously with the films' romantic leads. His best-known role of his Paramount tenure is probably the ham actor-turned-silent movie villain in the 1947 fictionalized Pearl White biography The Perils of Pauline. De Wolfe became known for his portrayal of fussy, petty men ("Never touch!," he would say imperiously whenever someone accosted him physically). The New York Times review of his 1948 film Isn't It Romantic strongly criticized the way the other actors' material limited their performances, contrasting their performances with his: "But Mr. De Wolfe is nothing daunted. He rips up the place with great delight. The material is at his mercy. Likewise the scenery. And he chews it to bits." Billy De Wolfe also played the role of Pemberton Maxwell, The American Embassy's chargé d'affaires in the 1953 musical Call Me Madam.

De Wolfe was a good friend of Doris Day for over two decades, from the time of their first meeting during the filming of the 1950 musical Tea for Two until his death. Their screen chemistry in that film led to De Wolfe being quickly recast as a supporting character of Day in the 1951 production Lullaby of Broadway.

== Return to stage and television work ==
After his Paramount contract lapsed, De Wolfe returned to the stage. He appeared in the revue John Murray Anderson's Almanac in 1953 and 1954, and starred in the last edition of the Ziegfeld Follies, in 1957.

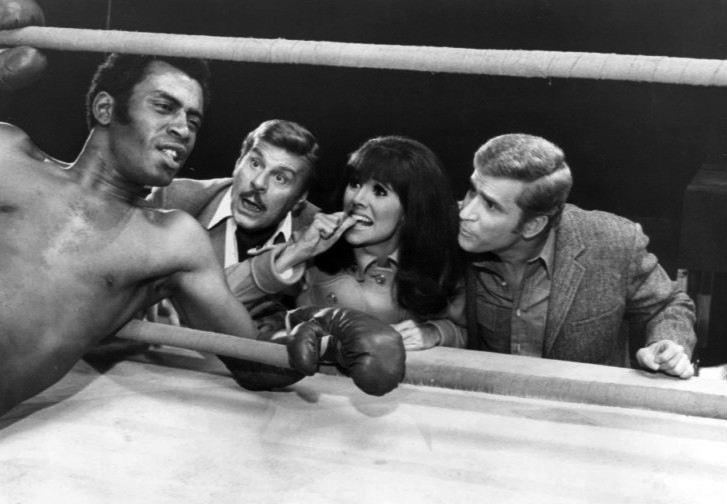
De Wolfe (second from left) with Scoey Mitchell (boxer), Marlo Thomas and Ted Bessell from That Girl, 1969

He appeared regularly in guest roles on television, including the first two episodes of NBC's The Imogene Coca Show. He portrayed Mr. Jarvis on CBS's The Doris Day Show, and co-starred with Larry Storch in a short-lived TV sitcom, The Queen and I. He often appeared on talk shows and in TV commercials, doing his "Mrs. Murgatroyd" drag routine. Wearing a hat and a shawl (but still sporting his mustache), De Wolfe (as old maid Phoebe Murgatroyd) would claim to be an expert on romance and answered questions from the lovelorn.

Generations of TV viewers know Billy De Wolfe only by his voice, such as the voice of the finicky but inept magician Professor Hinkle in the animated 1969 Christmas special Frosty the Snowman. That supporting character speaks with De Wolfe's precise but exaggerated diction: "Mess-y, mess-y, mess-y! Sill-y, sill-y, sill-y! Bus-y, bus-y, bus-y!"

In 1967–68 (one season, 26 episodes), he co-starred with Joby Baker and Ronnie Schell in the TV sitcom Good Morning World as Roland Hutton, the fussy manager at a radio station where David Lewis and Larry Clarke (Baker and Schell) are co-hosts.

In 1972, De Wolfe was scheduled to return to Broadway in the role of Madame Lucy in the musical revival of Irene starring Debbie Reynolds, Monte Markham, Ruth Warrick, and Patsy Kelly. During the early stages of rehearsals, however, DeWolfe learned that he was ill with cancer and was replaced by George S. Irving. Nevertheless, later that same year, De Wolfe recorded a vocal track for songs presented on the album Free to Be… You and Me, which was part of a children's entertainment project developed by actress and author Marlo Thomas. A related animated special was subsequently produced for television and aired on ABC on March 11, 1974, just six days after De Wolfe's death.

== Personal life and death ==
De Wolfe never married, and personal aspects of his life were rarely mentioned publicly during his career.

On February 26, 1974, suffering from an advanced case of lung cancer, De Wolfe was admitted to the University of California at Los Angeles Medical Center. He died there a week later, on March 5, two weeks after his 67th birthday. He was cremated at Hollywood Memorial Park (now Hollywood Forever Cemetery). His urn was sent in a private plane to be buried with his family in Quincy, Massachusetts.

== Filmography ==
Year	Title	Role	Notes
1943	Dixie	Mr. Bones	
1945	Duffy's Tavern	Doctor	
1946	Miss Susie Slagle's	Ben Mead	
1946	Our Hearts Were Growing Up	Roland du Frere	
1946	Blue Skies	Tony	
1947	Dear Ruth	Albert Kummer	
1947	The Perils of Pauline	Mr. Timmy Timmons	
1947	Variety Girl	Himself	
1948	Isn't It Romantic	Horace Frazier	
1949	Dear Wife	Albert Kummer	
1950	Tea for Two	Larry Blair	
1951	Lullaby of Broadway	Lefty Mack	
1951	Dear Brat	Albert	
1953	Call Me Madam	Pemberton Maxwell	
1960	Johnny Midnight	Damon	Episode: "The Impresario"
1965	Billie	Mayor Charlie Davis	
1965	The Dick Van Dyke Show	Rex	Episode: "The Ugliest Dog in the World"
1966–1969	That Girl	Jules Benedict	3 episodes
1967	Rango	Cribs	Episode: "Requiem for a Ranger"
1967–1968	Good Morning World	Roland B. Hutton Jr.	25 episodes
1969	Frosty the Snowman	Professor Hinkle / The Magician	TV Special, Voice
1970	The Debbie Reynolds Show	Delbert Deloy	Episode: "Mission: Improbable"
1970–1973	The Doris Day Show	Willard Jarvis / Billy De Wolfe / Randolph Jarvis	12 episodes
1972	Napoleon and Samantha	Man	Uncredited
1973	The World's Greatest Athlete	Dean Maxwell	
1973	Love, American Style	Mr. Gratz	(segment "Love and the Fractured Fibula"), 1 episode
1974	Free to Be… You and Me	The Principal	TV movie, Voice, (final film role)
