= Holiday in Havana =

1949 film by Jean Yarbrough

- Directed by: Jean Yarbrough
- Written by: Karen DeWolf; Robert Lees; Frederic I. Rinaldo
- Story by: Morton Grant
- Produced by: Ted Richmond
- Starring: Desi Arnaz; Mary Hatcher; Ann Doran
- Cinematography: Vincent J. Farrar
- Edited by: Henry Batista
- Music by: Paul Mertz
- Production company: Columbia Pictures
- Distributed by: Columbia Pictures
- Release date: October 15, 1949
- Running time: 73 minutes
- Country: United States
- Language: English

Holiday in Havana is a 1949 American musical comedy film directed by Jean Yarbrough, and starring Desi Arnaz, Mary Hatcher and Ann Doran. The film is about a Cuban hotel busboy (Arnaz) who dreams of becoming a composer. According to author Mary Beltrán, in his portrayal of Carlos Estrada, Arnaz "established a successful negotiation of tensions inherent in playing a Latin romantic lead in this period, a negotiation that set the stage for what would make Ricky Ricardo so popular with American viewers. His music, with songs such as "Holiday in Havana" and the "Arnaz Jam" featured in the film.

== Plot ==
The story about the difficult role of a Cuban bandleader Carlos Estrada. His romantic vis-a-vis is a peppery dancer named Lolita Valdez. Just before the lovers participate in a gala Havana festival, Carlos has a lot of explaining to do when Lolita catches him in the arms of another.

== Cast ==
- Desi Arnaz as Carlos Estrada
- Mary Hatcher as Lolita Valdez (Dolores)
- Ann Doran as Marge Henley
- Steven Geray as Lopez
- Minerva Urecal as Mama Valdez
- Sig Arno as Pepe
- Ray Walker as Sam Keegan
- Nacho Galindo as Police Sergeant
