= Tangier Incident (film) =

1953 film by Lew Landers

- Directed by: Lew Landers
- Written by: George Bricker
- Produced by: Ace Herman; Lindsley Parsons
- Starring: George Brent; Mari Aldon; Dorothy Patrick; Bert Freed
- Cinematography: William A. Sickner
- Edited by: Ace Herman
- Music by: Edward J. Kay
- Production company: Lindsley Parsons Picture Corporation
- Distributed by: Allied Artists
- Release date: February 1, 1953
- Running time: 77 minutes
- Country: United States
- Language: English

Tangier Incident is a 1953 American thriller film directed by Lew Landers and starring George Brent, Mari Aldon and Dorothy Patrick. It was one of several Hollywood films set in Tangier during the International Zone period.

== Cast ==
- George Brent as Steve Gordon
- Mari Aldon as Millicent
- Dorothy Patrick as Nadine
- Bert Freed as Kozad
- Dan Seymour as Police Inspector Rabat
- Alix Talton as Olga
- John Harmon as Tony
- Richard Karlan as Rosnov
- Shepard Menken as Kravich
- Benny Rubin as Blalu
- Michael Ross as Ivan
- Dayton Lummis as Henry Morrison

== Bibliography ==
- Edwards, Brian. Morocco Bound: Disorienting America’s Maghreb, from Casablanca to the Marrakech Express. Duke University Press, 2005.
