= Mona Freeman =

American actress (1926–2014)

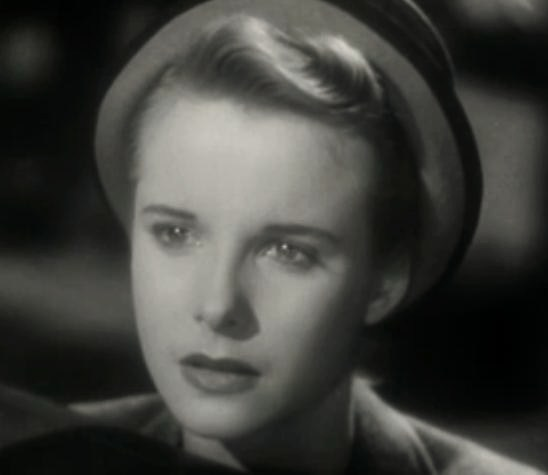
- Freeman in That Brennan Girl (1946)
- Born: Monica Elizabeth Freeman; June 9, 1926; Baltimore, Maryland, U.S.
- Died: May 23, 2014 (aged 87); Beverly Hills, California, U.S.
- Occupations: Actress, painter
- Years active: 1944–1972
- Spouses: Pat Nerney (m. 1945; div. 1952) H. Jack Ellis (m. 1961; died 1992)
- Children: 1

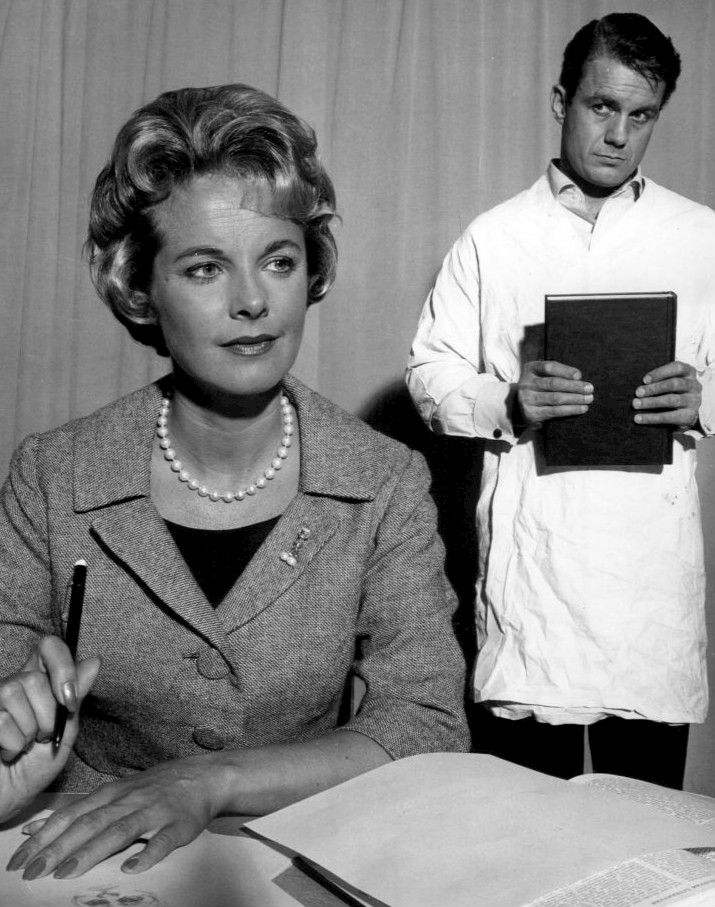
Freeman and Cliff Robertson in "The Two Worlds of Charlie Gordon", a 1961 presentation of The United States Steel Hour. Robertson reprised his role in the film Charly.

Monica Elizabeth "Mona" Freeman (June 9, 1926 – May 23, 2014) was an American actress and painter.

== Early years ==
Freeman was born in Baltimore, Maryland to Stuart Freeman and Monica Sharrett, and grew up in Pelham, New York. A lumberman's daughter, she was a model while in high school, and was selected the first "Miss Subways" of the New York City transit system in 1940.

== Career ==
Paramount Pictures signed Freeman to a contract after she moved to Hollywood. She eventually signed a movie contract with Howard Hughes.

Her contract was later sold to Paramount Pictures. Her first film appearance was in the 1944 film Till We Meet Again. She became a popular teenage movie star. After a series of roles as a pretty, naive teenager, she complained of being typecast.

As an adult, Freeman's career slowed and she appeared in mostly B-movies, though an exception was her role in the film noir Angel Face (1952). She also co-starred in the hit film Jumping Jacks with the comedy team of Dean Martin and Jerry Lewis.

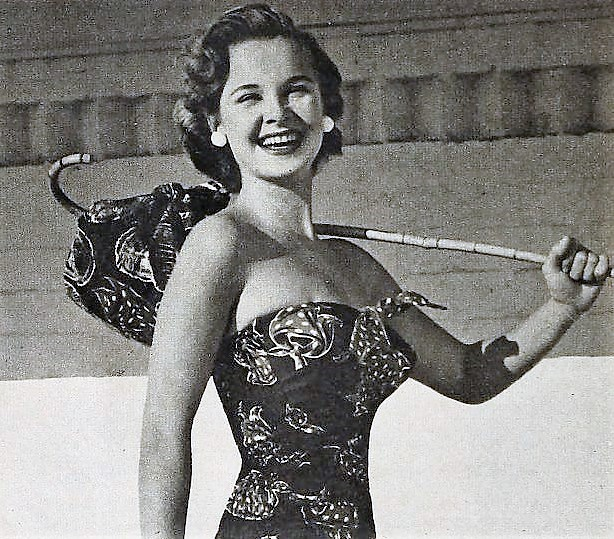
Mona Freeman in 1953

Freeman's appearances in films ended in the 1950s, but she continued to work in television. Among her appearances were seven guest roles on The United States Steel Hour from 1960 to 1962 and three on Perry Mason, all of them roles as Mason's client: Jane Wardman in "The Case of the Lurid Letter" (1962), Rosanne Ambrose in "The Case of the Illicit Illusion" (1964), and Ellen Payne in "The Case of the 12th Wildcat" (1965). She appeared in two episodes of Wanted: Dead or Alive starring Steve McQueen titled "The Fourth Headstone" (Season One, Episode 9, air date 11/1/1958) and "Breakout" (Season 2 Episode 4, aired 9/26/1959), and two episodes of Maverick titled "The Cats of Paradise" (1959) and "Cruise of the Cynthia B." (1960), both starring James Garner, in which she played a recurring role as crazy-eyed swindler Modesty Blaine. She also appeared in an episode of Riverboat titled "The Boy from Pittsburgh" (1959) starring Darren McGavin and Burt Reynolds, an episode of Checkmate titled "Don't Believe a Word She Says" (1961) starring Doug McClure and Sebastian Cabot, and an episode of The Tall Man titled "Petticoat Crusade" (1961) starring Barry Sullivan as Pat Garrett and Clu Gulager as Billy the Kid, along with numerous other leading lady roles in various television series, including anthologies.

Freeman was a portrait painter and concentrated on painting after 1961. Her best-known portrait is that of businesswoman Mary See, founder of See's Candies.

== Personal life and death ==
Freeman married Pat Nerney, a car dealer, in Los Angeles in 1945. The couple had one daughter, Mona. They divorced in 1952. In 1961, she married H. Jack Ellis, a businessman from Los Angeles.

Freeman died at her Beverly Hills home on May 23, 2014, at the age of 87, after a long illness.

== Partial filmography ==
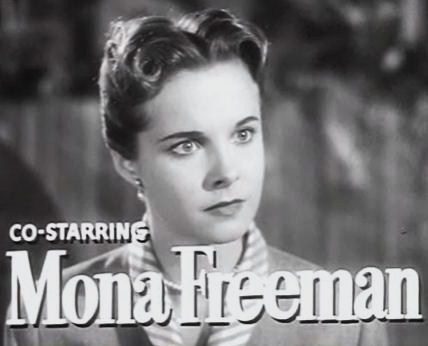
Trailer for Angel Face (1953) starring Robert Mitchum and Jean Simmons

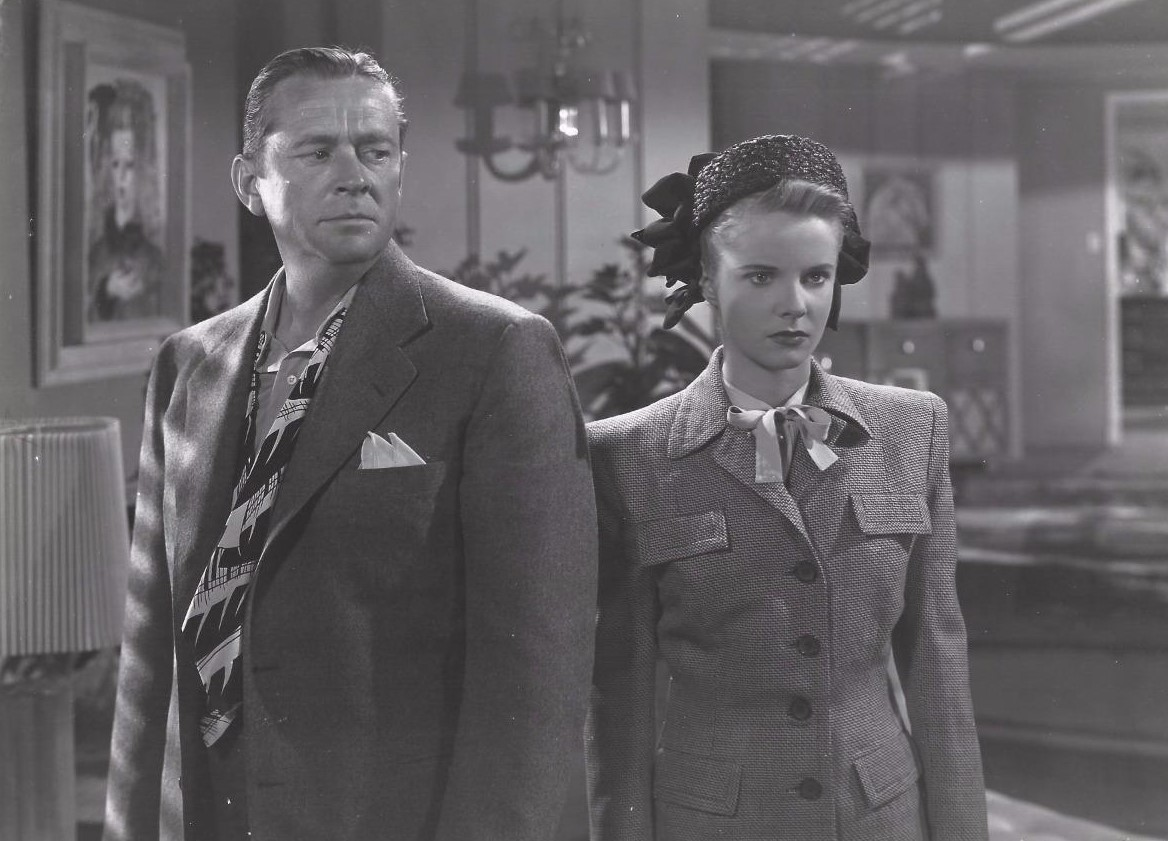
With James Dunn in That Brennan Girl (1946)

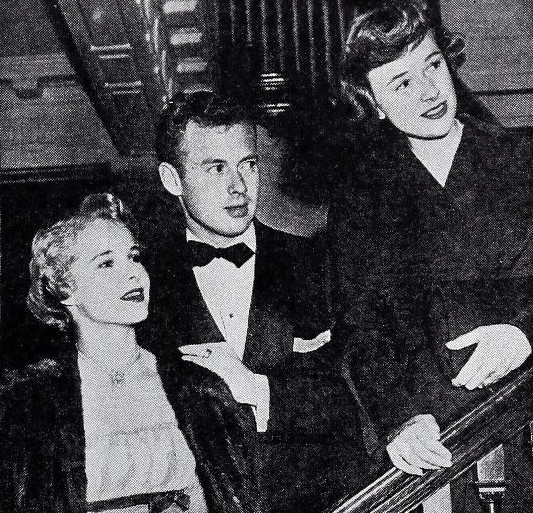
Freeman, her husband Pat Nerney, and Phyllis Thaxter depicted in Photoplay, 1949

- Till We Meet Again (1944) - Elise
- National Velvet (1944) - Schoolgirl (uncredited)
- Here Come the Waves (1944) - Fainting Girl (uncredited)
- Together Again (1944) - Diana Crandall
- Roughly Speaking (1945) - Barbara, ages 15–20
- Junior Miss (1945) - Lois Graves
- Danger Signal (1945) - Anne Fenchurch
- Our Hearts Were Growing Up (1946) - Girl (uncredited)
- Black Beauty (1946) - Anne Wendon
- That Brennan Girl (1946) - Ziggy Brennan
- Dear Ruth (1947) - Miriam Wilkins
- Mother Wore Tights (1947) - Iris
- Variety Girl (1947) - Mona Freeman
- Isn't It Romantic (1948) - Susie Cameron
- Streets of Laredo (1949) - Rannie Carter
- The Heiress (1949) - Marian Almond
- Dear Wife (1949) - Miriam Wilkins
- I Was a Shoplifter (1950) - Faye Burton
- Copper Canyon (1950) - Caroline Desmond
- Branded (1950) - Ruth Lavery
- Dear Brat (1951) - Miriam Wilkins
- Darling, How Could You! (1951) - Amy
- The Greatest Show on Earth (1952) - Spectator (uncredited)
- Flesh and Fury (1952) - Ann Hollis
- Jumping Jacks (1952) - Betsy Carter
- Thunderbirds (1952) - Lt. Ellen Henderson
- Angel Face (1953) - Mary Wilton
- Battle Cry (1955) - Kathy - later Mrs. Danny Forrester
- Before I Wake (1955) - April Haddon (U.S. title, Shadow of Fear)
- The Road to Denver (1955) - Elizabeth Sutton
- Dial 999 (1955) - Terry Moffat Carradine
- Huk! (1956) - Cindy Rogers
- Hold Back the Night (1956) - Anne Franklin McKenzie
- Dragoon Wells Massacre (1957) - Ann Bradley
- The World Was His Jury (1958) - Robin Carson

== Partial television credits ==
- Wanted: Dead or Alive (2 episodes)
  "The Fourth Headstone" (1958) - Jackie Harris
  "Breakout" (1959) - Margaret Dunn
- Wagon Train
  "The Monty Britton Story" (1958) - Betty Britton
- The Red Skelton Hour (2 episodes)
  "San Fernando's Singing Sensation" (1958) - Guest
  "Freddie Gets a Job" (1959) - Kathy
- Pursuit
  "Calculated Risk" (1958) - Nina Hodges
- Playhouse 90 (3 episodes)
  "Sizeman and Son" (1956) - Marie Sizeman
  "Three Men on a Horse" (1957) - Audrey Trowbridge
  "The Long March" (1958) - Betsy
- The DuPont Show with June Allyson
  "The Pledge" (1959) - Sandra McAllen
- Maverick (2 episodes)
  "The Cats Of Paradise" (1959) - Modesty Blaine
  "The Cruise of the Cynthia B" (1960) - Modesty Blaine
- Johnny Ringo
  "Mrs. Ringo" (1960) - Marilyn Barber
- United States Steel Hour
  "The Two Worlds of Charlie Gordon" (1961)
- Perry Mason (3 episodes)
  "The Case of the Lurid Letter" (1962) - Jane Wardman
  "The Case of the Illicit Illusion" (1964) - Rosanne Ambrose
  "The Case of the 12th Wildcat" (1965) - Ellen Payne
