= Bombs Over Burma =

1943 film by Joseph H. Lewis

- Theatrical release poster
- Directed by: Joseph H. Lewis
- Screenplay by: Joseph H. Lewis; George Wellington Pardy
- Story by: Milton Raison
- Produced by: Arthur Alexander; Alfred Stern
- Starring: Anna May Wong
- Cinematography: Robert E. Cline
- Edited by: Charles Henkel Jr.
- Music by: Lee Zahler
- Distributed by: Producers Releasing Corporation
- Release date: June 5, 1942
- Running time: 65 minutes
- Country: United States
- Languages: English; Mandarin

Bombs Over Burma (also known as The Devil's Sister) is a 1942 American war film directed by Joseph H. Lewis, based on a story by Milton Raison. To depict the Chinese character faithfully, the star, Anna May Wong, and other characters speak Mandarin in the first few minutes.

== Plot ==
In 1942, Chinese guerrillas fighting for the Allied cause in Burma during World War II are helping to build a road. During the construction of a military supply road like the Burma Road and Ledo Road, the project is sabotaged by an English nobleman who is a German agent.

Using a scientific device, the English nobleman is instrumental in the coordination of a Japanese air attack on supply trucks attempting to cross a key bridge. A Chinese school teacher (Anna May Wong) reveals the schemes of the traitor, and brings about his destruction at the hands of Chinese peasants armed with picks and shovels.

== Cast ==
As appearing in Bombs Over Burma, (main roles and screen credits identified):

- Anna May Wong as Lin Ying
- Noel Madison as Me-Hoi
- Leslie Denison as Sir Roger Howe
- Nedrick Young as Slim Jenkins
- Dan Seymour as Pete Brogranza
- Frank Lackteen as Hallam
- Teala Loring as Lucy Dell
- Dennis Moore as Tom Whitley
- Connie Leon as Ma Sing
- Hayward Soo Hoo as Ling
- Richard Loo as Col. Kim
- Paul Fung as Toy Vendor
- Richard Wong as Servant

== Production ==
Lack of an adequate budget and a two-week shooting schedule hampered the production, limiting Bombs Over Burma to "B-fare".

== Reception ==
Production values doomed Bombs Over Burma both at the box office and with critics. The review in The New York Times succinctly called it a "dud", loaded with stock shots, even recognizable "California architecture." Later reviews such as that of Leonard Maltin, noted that the film was an "... interesting if failed attempt to make a hard-hitting, topical film ... Director/cowriter Lewis' visual flair can't save a talky, pedestrian script. Wong comes off well, as usual."

== Availability ==
Alpha Video released the film on region-1 DVD on June 28, 2005.
