= Dear Wife =

1949 film by Richard Haydn

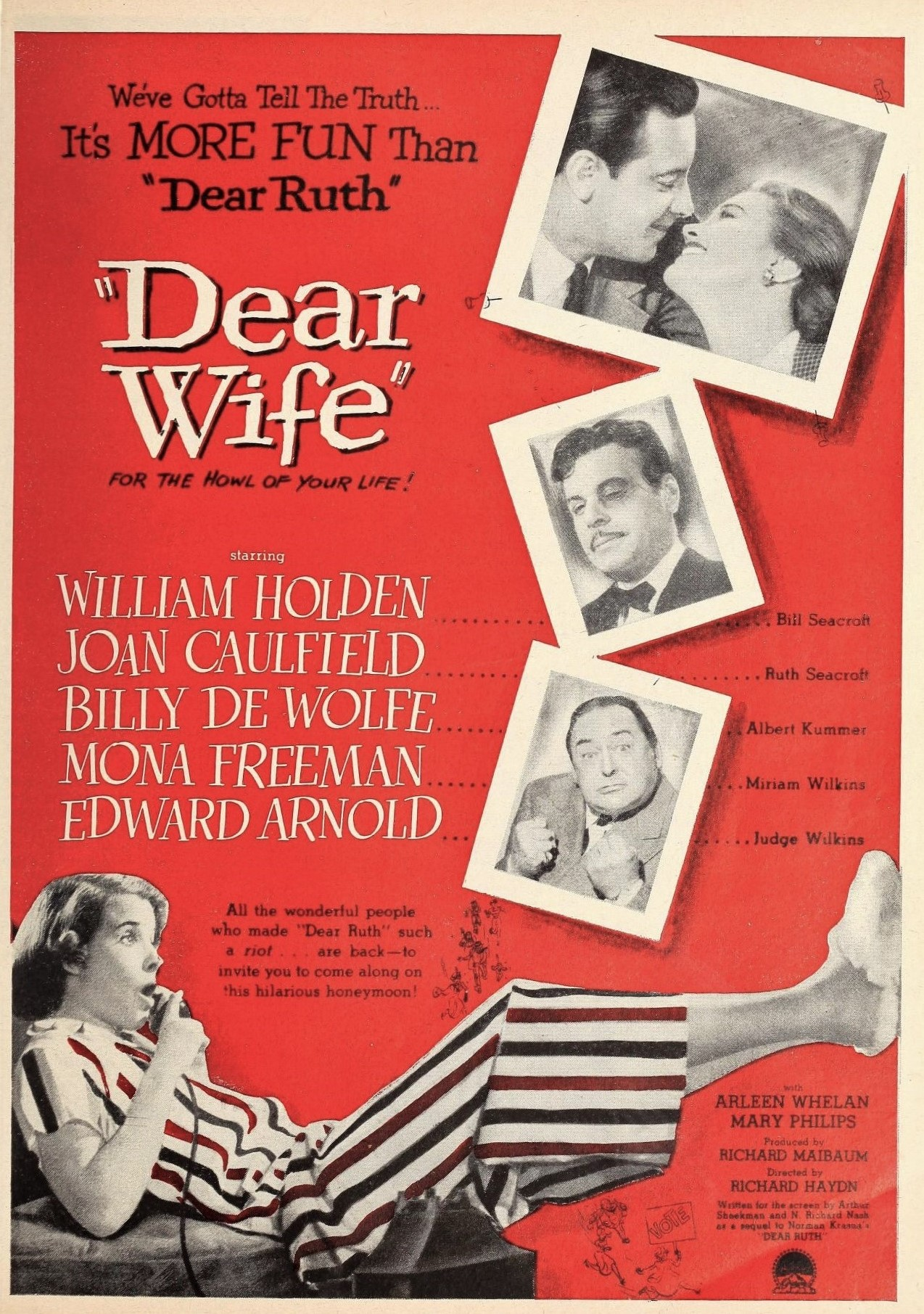
- Theatrical poster
- Directed by: Richard Haydn
- Written by: Norman Krasna (characters); Arthur Sheekman; N. Richard Nash
- Produced by: Richard Maibaum
- Starring: Joan Caulfield; William Holden
- Cinematography: Stuart Thompson
- Edited by: Doane Harrison; Archie Marshek
- Music by: Joseph J. Lilley; Van Cleave
- Distributed by: Paramount Pictures
- Release dates: 1949; February 1, 1950 (United States)
- Running time: 88 minutes
- Country: United States
- Language: English
- Box office: $1.725,000

Dear Wife is a 1949 comedy film starring Joan Caulfield and William Holden. It is the sequel to Dear Ruth, which was based on the Broadway play of the same name by Norman Krasna.

== Plot ==
Miriam Wilkins is a teenage girl who is campaigning for her brother-in-law Bill Seacroft to be elected to the state senate, but without his knowledge. Bill is a middle-aged war veteran who works at a bank and is frustrated by having to live with his wife Ruth's family. Bill wants to be more independent and stand on his own two feet.

Ruth's father, Judge Harry Wilkins, has already been nominated for state senator. The Wilkins family is shocked to learn that Bill will run against him in the election. Harry comes to terms with the situation, believing his chances of winning considerable, but is upset when Miriam calls him a political "fathead" in a local newspaper article.

As the two campaigns begin, Ruth becomes jealous of Tommy Murphy, Bill's beautiful female campaign manager. Harry hires Albert Krummer, Ruth's former fiancé and Bill's current boss, as his campaign manager. The conflict between the two camps deepens. Albert, still in love with Ruth, seeks to inflame the rising conflict between Ruth and Bill.

Bill begins to take his campaign seriously and publicly airs his views on Harry's policy concerning a new local airport. Bill states that the airport would force many city residents out of their homes. Miriam uses her influence as secretary of the Civic Betterment Committee to arrange a live radio broadcast in support of Bill's campaign. The broadcast is a complete disaster and throws everyone into conflict. By the end of the broadcast, Bill and Ruth have separated because she stubbornly refuses to join him and move out of the family house. Harry disapproves of the separation, and he later informs Bill of a duplex that Ruth is showing in her new job as a real-estate agent.

Taking his father-in-law's advice, Bill rents the duplex, which is located in another district. He and Ruth almost reunite, but she refuses to move in with him because she is still too jealous of Bill's campaign manager Tommy. Bill's relationship with Tommy is strictly business, but she admits to Bill that she has fallen for him. He rejects her advances, but it is too late. Ruth accepts a new job in Chicago and plans to move there. Miriam wishes to reunite the couple, and as she has just had a fight with her boyfriend Ziggy, she convinces Bill to take her to a dance.

Ruth is already on her way to the railway station with Albert, who hopes to renew their relationship. Harry arranges for the police to arrest Albert because of his car's bad brakes. Albert and Ruth are brought into court, and Harry insists that they remain in town for the trial, which will not be heard until next week. Bill and Albert meet at the dance, and Albert informs Bill that he has been disqualified as a candidate because he moved to another district. Harry's sponsor announces that a piece of land will be donated to any homeowner displaced by the new airport.

When Harry wins the senate race, the political conflict is resolved. Bill fights with Albert at the dance and punches him for interfering with his marriage. Meanwhile, Harry lectures Ruth about her duties as a wife. Ruth and Bill finally reunite. Miriam secretly starts a new petition to nominate Bill for state senator.

== Cast ==
- Edward Arnold as Judge Wilkins
- Mary Philips as Mrs. Edie Wilkins
- Mona Freeman as Miriam Wilkins
- Joan Caulfield as Ruth Wilkins then Seacroft
- William Holden as Bill Seacroft
- Billy De Wolfe as Albert Kummer
- Arleen Whelan as Tommy Murphy

== Production ==
In 1945, Paramount paid a record $400,000 for the film rights to the hit play Dear Ruth. This included the right to use the characters in a sequel. In December 1947, the studio announced the sequel, featuring many of the original cast. Arthur Sheekman, who co-wrote Dear Ruth, and N. Richard Nash were assigned to write the script and Richard Maibaum was to direct. However, Maibaum produced the film, and Richard Haydn, who appears in a small role in the film billed as Stanley Stayle, directed.

Filming began in early 1949 when William Holden became free after the screen adaptation of Thomas Savage's book Lona Hanson was shelved.

== Reception ==
Dear Wife was screened for preview audiences on December 31, 1949 and premiered in New York on February 1, 1950, at the Paramount Theatre with an accompanying stage show featuring actress Celeste Holm. On March 2, the film began its run at Paramount's Hollywood and downtown Los Angeles theaters.

In a contemporary review for The New York Times, critic Thomas M. Pryor wrote: "As sequels go, the new picture is most unusual for it is every bit as enjoyable and racy as its progenitor. This spectator had a good time all the way and so apparently did the audience".

Reviewing the film in the Los Angeles Times, John L. Scott wrote: "'Dear Wife' is pleasant to take although, when you review it, there really isn't much to the story. It's for the family trade and should hit its stride in the neighborhoods".
