= Dear Brat =

1951 film by William A. Seiter

- Directed by: William A. Seiter
- Written by: Devery Freeman
- Starring: Mona Freeman; Billy De Wolfe
- Cinematography: John F. Seitz
- Edited by: Alma Macrorie
- Music by: Van Cleave
- Production company: Paramount Pictures
- Distributed by: Paramount Pictures
- Release dates: May 30, 1951; June 21, 1950 (Los Angeles); July 4, 1950 (New York)
- Running time: 82 minutes
- Country: United States
- Language: English

Dear Brat is a 1951 American comedy film directed by William A. Seiter and starring Mona Freeman and Billy De Wolfe. It is the third in a series, following Dear Ruth (1947) and Dear Wife (1949).

== Plot ==
Miriam Wilkins has founded an association for rehabilitation of former prisoners, and her father is unknowingly the group's honorary president. As convict Mr. Baxter is set free on parole, Miriam sees an opportunity for action. She hires Baxter as a gardener, allowing him live in a room over the garage. However, Baxter's sentence had been imposed by Judge Wilkins, now a senator, causing the situation in the house to become chaotic.

== Cast ==
- Mona Freeman as Miriam Wilkins
- Billy De Wolfe as Albert
- Edward Arnold as Senator Wilkins
- Lyle Bettger as Mr. Baxter
- Natalie Wood as Pauline

== Production ==
In March 1950, Paramount announced a sequel to Dear Wife titled Dear Mom. Arthur Sheekman and Jack Sher were assigned to write the script and Robert Welsch was to produce. In August, Norman Z. McLeod was suspended by Paramount for refusing to direct the film. That same month, the project was retitled Dear Brat. It was to be based on an original story by Deverey Freeman and produced by Mel Epstein. In October, Lyle Bettger was cast, but Joan Caulfield and William Holden, who had starred in Dear Ruth and Dear Wife, did not return. Filming began on October 20, with William Seiter as director, and was completed by the end of November.

== Reception ==
In a contemporary review for The New York Times, critic Bosley Crowther called the film a "scatterbrained display of juvenile stuff and nonsense" and "an off-hand conglomeration of domestic farce".

Critic John L. Scott of the Los Angeles Times wrote that the film "is very amusing in some spots, dull in others when gag situations flatten out".

In The Philadelphia Inquirer, reviewer Mildred Martin wrote: "Paramount has tried one sequel too many in its Wilkins family series ... With Ruth and Bill gone, the charm and humor of the series has vanished also. For 'Dear Brat' is little more than a collection of witless, incredible incidents, more trying than entertaining, and no picnic for survivors from the two previous films of the series."

== Comic-book adaption ==
- Eastern Color Movie Love #10 (August 1951)
