= Mask of Dust =

1954 British film by Terence Fisher

- Theatrical release poster
- Directed by: Terence Fisher
- Written by: Richard H. Landau
- Based on: The Last Race by Jon Manchip White
- Starring: Richard Conte; Mari Aldon; Peter Illing
- Cinematography: Walter J. Harvey; Len Harris
- Edited by: Bill Lenny
- Music by: Leonard Salzedo
- Production company: Hammer Film Productions
- Distributed by: Exclusive Films; Lippert Pictures (US)
- Release date: 27 December 1954 (UK)
- Running time: 79 minutes (UK); 69 minutes (US)
- Country: United Kingdom
- Language: English

Mask of Dust is a 1954 British second feature motor racing drama film directed by Terence Fisher and starring Richard Conte, Mari Aldon, George Coulouris and Peter Illing. It was written by Richard H. Landau based on the 1953 novel The Last Race by Jon Manchip White. Jimmy Sangster was production manager, J. Elder Wills was art director and Phil Leakey handled Makeup. Filming ran from 25 March 1954 until 8 May 1954. The film was trade shown on 23 Nov., and released on 27 December in the UK. It was released in January 1955 in the United States by Lippert Pictures retitled A Race for Life.

== Plot ==
A freestyle racing driver must choose between his love for racing, and his wife. His friend's accident will help him to choose, and his loyal ways will get him a new friend – his main rival.

== Cast ==
- Richard Conte as Peter Wells
- Mari Aldon as Patricia Wells
- Peter Illing as Tony Bellario
- Alec Mango as Guido Rosetti
- James Copeland as Johnny Jackson
- George Coulouris as 'Pic' Dallapiccola
- Meredith Edwards as Laurence Gibson
- Edwin Richfield as reporter in lounge
- Richard Marner as Hans Brecht
- Tim Turner as Alvarez
- Jeremy Hawk as Martin
- Stirling Moss as himself
- Reg Parnell as Reg Parnell
- John Cooper as John Cooper
- Alan Brown as Alan Brown
- Leslie Marr as Leslie Marr
- John Welsh as priest
- Paul Carpenter as racetrack announcer
- Raymond Baxter as racetrack announcer

== Production ==
The film was produced by Hammer Films at the company's Bray Studios, with sets designed by the art director J. Elder Wills.

== Critical response ==
Monthly Film Bulletin said "Skilful use of newsreel material in the actual racing sequences raises this routine story slightly above the average. Shots of racing at Crystal Palace, Silverstone and Le Mans are effectively put together, giving some excitement and realism to this part of the film. In contrast, the familiar squabbles and domestic difficulties of Wells and his wife take on a decidedly hollow look. The playing on the whole is adequate, but the cast sems resigned to the fact that the cars are the real stars"

In British Sound Films: The Studio Years 1928–1959 David Quinlan rated the film as "average", writing: "Servicable drama with well-integrated racing sequences."

The Radio Times Guide to Films gave the film 1/5 stars, writing: "Hammer's American partner imposed a Hollywood scriptwriter and sent over not one, but two minor US stars for this cheap action drama. British racing drivers such as Stirling Moss appear as themselves and double for lead Richard Conte and other players in this cliché-ridden tale. The intercut footage of real races shows up the artificiality."
