= That Brennan Girl =

1946 film by Alfred Santell

- 1951 theatrical release poster
- Directed by: Alfred Santell
- Screenplay by: Doris Anderson
- Story by: Adela Rogers St. Johns
- Produced by: Alfred Santell
- Starring: James Dunn; Mona Freeman; William Marshall; June Duprez
- Cinematography: Jack A. Marta
- Edited by: Arthur Roberts
- Music by: George Antheil
- Production company: Republic Pictures
- Distributed by: Republic Pictures
- Release date: December 23, 1946 (United States)
- Running time: 95 minutes
- Country: United States
- Language: English

That Brennan Girl, also known as Tough Girl, is a 1946 American melodrama film produced and directed by Alfred Santell and starring James Dunn, Mona Freeman, William Marshall, and June Duprez. The story concerns a young woman raised in an unwholesome environment who joins a confidence racket run by one of her mother's friends. She agrees to marry the victim of one of her scams, becomes a war widow, and is left to raise a baby, but abandons it each evening to go out dancing. After the child suffers an accident in her absence, she is charged with child neglect and loses custody. She mends her ways by devotedly caring for an abandoned infant and meets up again with the con man, who has also reformed after a prison stint, and together they build a new life. The film was the last work of director Santell and the last leading role for actor Dunn.

In 2018 a re-mastered and restored print by Paramount Pictures, The Film Foundation, and Martin Scorsese was screened at the Museum of Modern Art as part of the museum's program of showcasing 30 restored films from the library of Republic Pictures, curated by Scorsese.

== Plot ==
On Mother's Day 1946, a woman known as Ziggy Brennan looks back on her life.

Eight years earlier, her vain and corrupt mother Natalie asks Ziggy to pretend they are sisters. Together they trick men out of money. Ziggy takes a liking to a con artist, Denny Reagan, and steals a sailor's watch that Denny admires. The watch's inscription, showing it is a gift from the boy's mother, gives Denny a guilty conscience, so Ziggy returns it to Mart Neilson, the sailor. He asks her on a date, which leads to marriage. Two days later Neilson is shipped off to war. He is killed in action while Ziggy is pregnant with their child.

Ziggy is warned by Natalie after the birth of baby Martha that she is not fit for motherhood. Denny is now doing time in a penitentiary, so he is no help either. Ziggy likes to go out dancing every night, leaving Martha with an irresponsible young babysitter. While the babysitter sneaks out to be with her boyfriend, Martha tumbles out of her crib and is nearly strangled by the bedsheets. A landlady's testimony results in the baby being sent to a juvenile ward. Ziggy is given a suspended sentence for child neglect, but is forbidden from having contact with her child. Denny's mother tracks down Ziggy and encourages her to pray for salvation.

By the time Denny leaves prison, he is a reformed man. He tracks down Ziggy and finds that she has taken in an abandoned infant found in a local church and is caring for it, having named him Denny. Together they appeal to the court for a second chance, then leave together with both children, united as a family.

== Cast ==
- James Dunn as Denny Reagan
- Mona Freeman as Ziggy Brennan
- William Marshall as CPO Martin J. 'Mart' Neilson
- June Duprez as Natalie Brennan
- Frank Jenks as Joe the cabbie
- Dorothy Vaughan as Mrs. Reagan, Denny's mother
- Charles Arnt as Fred, Natalie's second husband
- Rosalind Ivan as Mrs. Merryman, the landlady
- Fay Helm as Helen, Ziggy's neighbor
- Bill Kennedy as Arthur, Helen's husband
- Connie Leon as Miss Jane
- Edythe Elliott as Miss Unity
- Sarah Padden as Mrs. Graves, the nice landlady
- Jean Stevens as Dottie, Natalie's friend
- Lucien Littlefield as the florist
- Marion Martin as Marion, Natalie's girlfriend

== Production ==
=== Development ===
The screenplay by Doris Anderson was based on a story by Adela Rogers St. Johns. The script underwent several rewrites on the orders of Joseph I. Breen, director of the Production Code Administration.

=== Casting ===
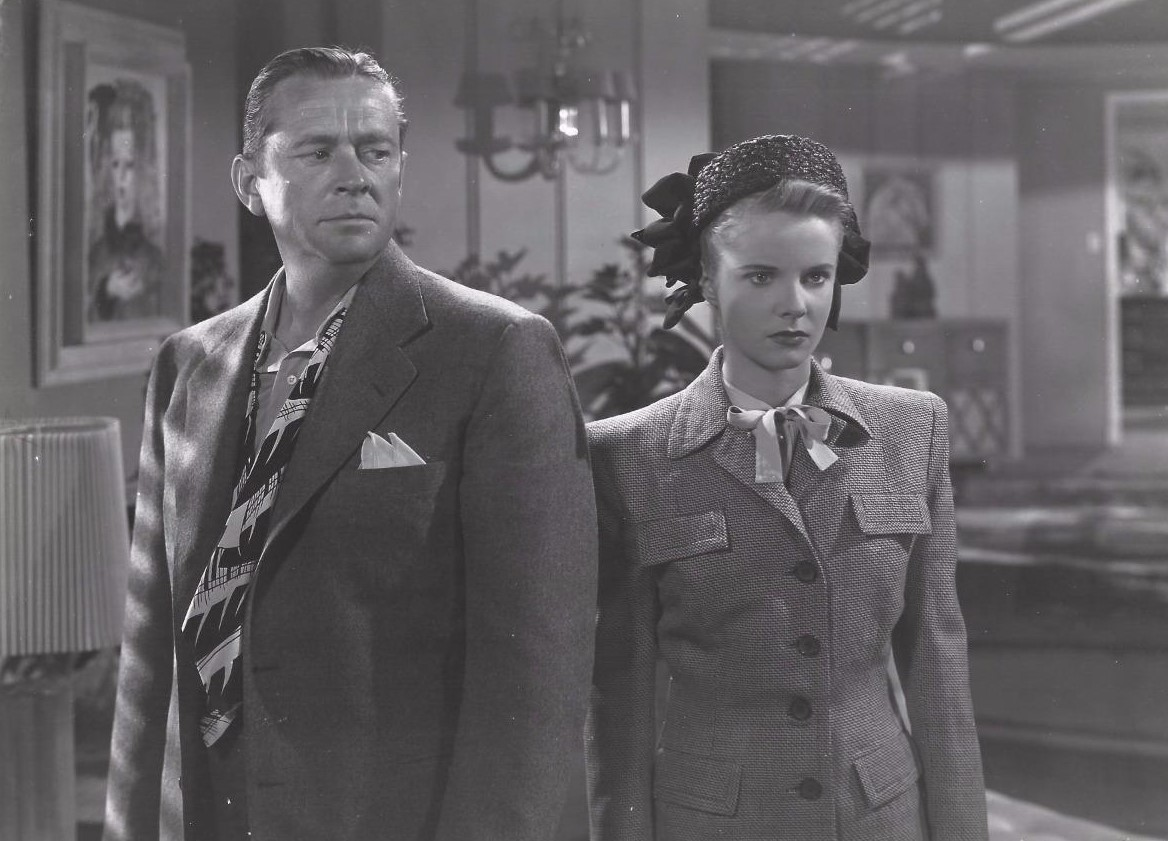
James Dunn and Mona Freeman in That Brennan Girl

The Times Colonist noted that James Dunn and June Duprez were both cast against type. Dunn, who had won an Academy Award for Best Supporting Actor for his performance as an alcoholic father in A Tree Grows in Brooklyn (1945), here played "a daring, but sentimental young gangster". Duprez, typically viewed by film producers as "an Oriental princess type", was cast as "a hardboiled and rowdy mother".

Mona Freeman was cast in the lead role of Ziggy after an extensive talent search. In December 1945, director Alfred Santell returned from a New York trip during which he tested dozens of actresses; he was said to be looking for "some girl who looked like Lana Turner or Gene Tierney and could act like Sylvia Sidney". Freeman, aged 21, was ultimately signed, having played mostly juvenile parts in her short film career.

Martha as a 3-year-old was played by Colette Granlund from Mendocino County. She was spotted by a talent scout while visiting San Francisco's Golden Gate Park with her parents.

=== Filming ===
Production took place between late April and early June 1946. Much of the shooting took place on location in the streets and harbor of San Francisco. The actors blended in with passersby and were filmed in street scenes by a hidden camera enclosed in a truck trailing slowly behind them, and in sidewalk close-ups by a camera hidden in a baby carriage. Unable to find a suitable house in San Francisco, the film crew used a stately Old California home in Pasadena for the scene in which the racketeers carry out an expensive sofa into their truck.

Dunn's mother died in Los Angeles during the filming, with Dunn at her side.

== Release ==
The film was released on December 23, 1946.

In 1951, the film was re-edited and re-released under the title Tough Girl.

== Critical reception ==
Critics generally praised the acting and direction but decried the plot and script, characterizing it as a "seamy-side melodrama" and "a run-of-the-mill problem melodrama". The Chicago Tribune wrote: "Jimmy Dunn does as well as anyone could, considering the plot and the script, and Mona Freeman is appealing, but the whole business is leaden and definitely second class fare". The St. Louis Globe-Democrat found it difficult to make sense of the story and its message. Ziggy starts out earning audience sympathy for her difficult upbringing, but loses it by accepting her mother's advice that "the path of easy virtue is the easy way". Denny is at the same time a racketeer and "a likeable Irishman who is ever so good to his mother". After Ziggy suffers for her hedonistic lifestyle and Denny serves time in prison, their reunion seems to convey that "their romance should be both logical and appealing".

The Pittsburgh Post-Gazette called Dunn's performance "restrained and believable … [b]ut this role doesn't give him a chance to show the stuff he did in A Tree Grows in Brooklyn". Similarly, The San Francisco Examiner commended Dunn for being "more than adequate in an inadequate role".

Freeman's performance received harsher scrutiny in light of the extremes of personality she was required to play. The Baltimore Sun wrote:

Miss Freeman looks lovely, innocent, and very young, at all times. This is remarkable when you consider that she has to impersonate a thief, a devoted young mother, a brazen mantrap, an industrious housewife, a shoplifter, a war widow, a bar butterfly, a confidence woman and a specimen of fine womanhood, and all within 95 minutes. The only way Republic could get this role played right would be to have Katharine Cornell, Helen Hayes, June Havoc and Ina Claire do it in relays. Even then we wouldn't like it.

The Fort Worth Star-Telegram wrote: "Miss Freeman should get A-plus for her sincere attempt to play a bad girl. Fine features, a sensitive face and a touch of gentleness about her makes it doubtful casting. A tougher brat would have filled the role better". The Pittsburgh Post-Gazette panned Freeman's acting as "immature". At the same time, it gave kudos to the performances of actresses June Duprez, Dorothy Vaughn, and Rosalind Ivan, calling the latter's portrayal of the landlady "excellent". The Pittsburgh Sun-Telegraph also singled out actresses who played minor characters – including the babysitter (Shirley Mills in an uncredited role), two lonely women, and an assortment of neighbors – for praise.

Santell's direction received positive mention in several reviews. The Los Angeles Times called the film "reminiscent of the late '20s in direction (by Old-Timer Alfred Santell) and 'feel'". The Pittsburgh Sun-Telegraph complimented Santell's "minor directorial flourishes", adding, "As a matter of fact, his contribution alone puts the picture into the general category of worth seeing". The Minneapolis Star called George Antheil's score "outstanding".

== Restoration ==
A re-mastered, restored print of That Brennan Girl by Paramount Pictures, The Film Foundation, and Martin Scorsese was screened at the Museum of Modern Art (MoMA) in February 2018. The screening was the first in a two-part series titled Martin Scorsese Presents Republic Rediscovered: New Restorations from Paramount Pictures, which showcased 30 restored films from the library of Republic Pictures. The restoration was released on the Apple TV app the following year.

The MoMA website calls the film "[u]naccountably overlooked" and a "resonant, formally inventive film". According to The Village Voice, the work displays a host of Santell's creative directorial touches, such as "scenes played in silhouette, in pantomime as the camera watches through a window, on two or three levels of a staircase in a couple of scenes reminiscent of The Magnificent Ambersons". This report concluded that the film demonstrated "the kind of creativity that once flourished at Republic".
