= Mary Hatcher =

American actress (1929–2018)

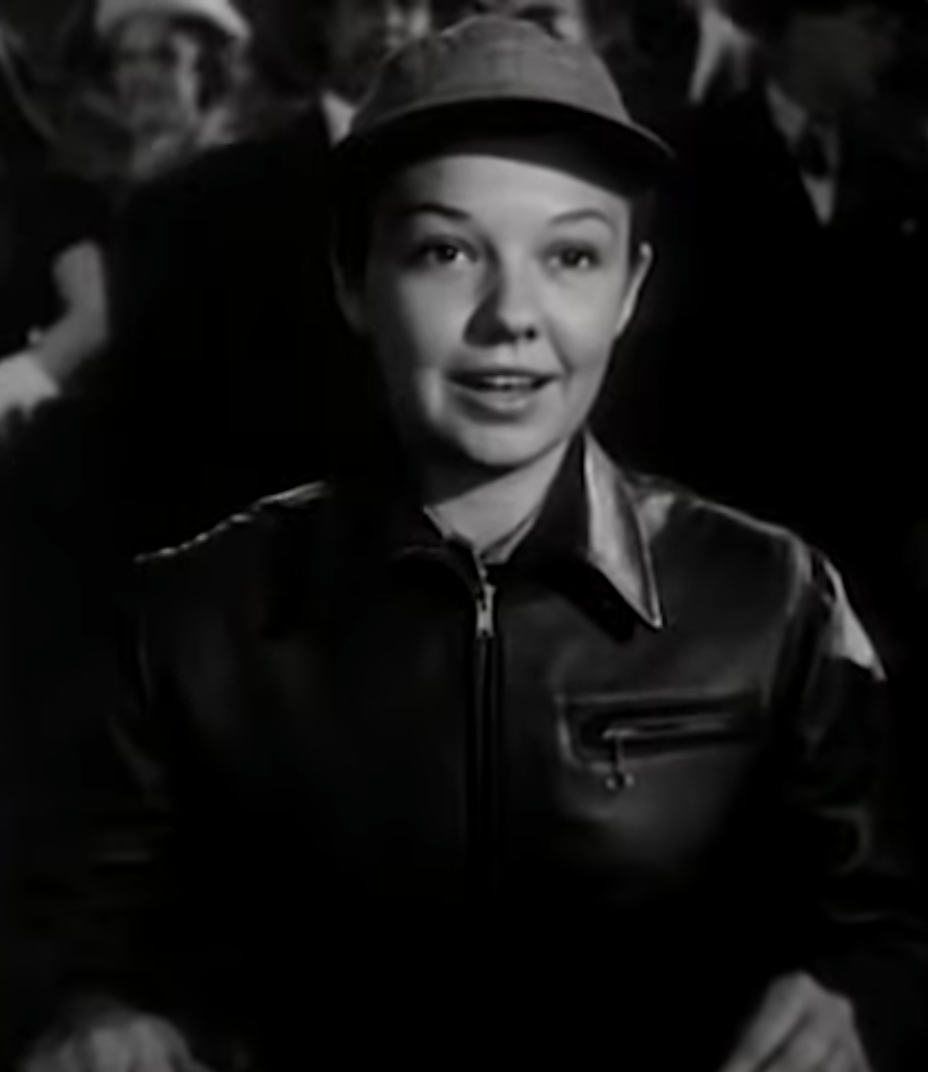
- Hatcher in The Big Wheel (1949)
- Born: June 6, 1929; Haines City, Florida, U.S.
- Died: April 3, 2018 (aged 88); Riverside, California, U.S.
- Occupation: Actress
- Years active: 1946–1951
- Spouse: James Alexander (m. 1946; annulled 19??) Herkie Styles (m. 1949; div. 19??) Alvin Stoller (m. 1951; died 1992)
- Children: 2

Mary Hatcher (June 6, 1929 – April 3, 2018) was an American coloratura soprano and actress whose screen career spanned the years from 1946-51. During that time she appeared in eight films, mostly in credited roles and several times as leading lady.

== Early life and career ==
She was the daughter of William Frank Hatcher. His employer, Ralph Polk, heard one of Mary's weekly broadcasts that featured operatic and classical songs, and he provided funds so that she could obtain professional voice training, including attending the Gardner School for Girls and the school of Queens Mario of the Metropolitan Opera.

== Film career ==
By 1944, the Hatcher family had moved to California, and in August that year Paramount Pictures signed Mary to a seven-year contract. When she was 15, Hatcher was selected to play Laurey in a road production of Oklahoma! At the same time, she was already signed to the movie contract, but her film debut was delayed for a year while she toured with the play.

In 1946, Hatcher made her first film appearance, an uncredited role as a chorus girl in M-G-M's Till the Clouds Roll By. Her first credited screen role came later that year when she played Dibs Downing in Our Hearts Were Growing Up. She had another uncredited role in the 1947 film, The Trouble with Women. Later in 1947, Hatcher's career received a major boost when Paramount gave her the title role in the all-star revue Variety Girl. The film's sketchy plot followed the exploits of two young women trying to break into the movies. Their adventures on the Paramount lot provided a frame for short cameo performances by practically every player the studio had under contract, including stars like Bing Crosby, Bob Hope, Gary Cooper, Paulette Goddard and Burt Lancaster.

In 1948, Hatcher was featured as Veronica Lake's sister in the musical Isn't It Romantic?. Her show business career reached its high point in 1949 when she starred in two pictures, first in The Big Wheel, an auto racing action film with Mickey Rooney and Thomas Mitchell, then opposite Desi Arnaz in the Latin musical frolic Holiday in Havana. Also in 1949, she appeared on Broadway as Dallas Smith, the female lead in Johnny Mercer's musical Texas, L'il Darlin, which opened to a mixed reception and closed after a medium-length run of 293 performances. Her Broadway credits also include Oklahoma!.

== Personal appearances ==
Hatcher visited Tampa in 1951 to perform with her husband, Herkie Styles, at the Skyline Room of the Bayshore Royal Hotel. The local press described the formerly brunette Hatcher as "very blond", noting she had recently been singing with Howard Keel in the extended Broadway run of Oklahoma!. In February 1951, Hatcher was a headliner at the El Rancho Vegas Hotel in Las Vegas on a bill including Herkie Styles and Benny Goodman. In 1951-52, she starred as Maid Marian in Tales of Robin Hood.

== Later life ==
Hatcher left show business in 1952, partially due to the fact that her marriage to Styles had ended. She declined the offer to play Alice Kramden in The Honeymooners. On September 23, 1951, she married drummer Alvin Stoller in Westwood, California, and became a housewife. She remained married to Stoller until his death in 1992. Despite retiring from show business, she occasionally appeared on television and composed songs.

== Personal life ==
Hatcher married James Alexander on August 12, 1946, in Seattle. At the time, the two were touring in a production of Oklahoma!, with Alexander playing Curley and Hatcher playing Laurey. A problem, arose, however, because Hatcher, at 17, needed her parents' consent to marry, and they did not consent. Her father had the marriage annulled. On May 9, 1949, Hatcher married Herkie Styles in St. Louis. At the time, Styles was a comedian with Benny Goodman's orchestra.

== Death ==
Hatcher died at the age of 88 from bile duct cancer at a hospital in Riverside, California. Her death was announced by her grandson, John Stoller. She was also survived by her brother, two children, six other grandchildren and two great-grandchildren.

== Filmography ==
- Our Hearts Were Growing Up (1946)
- Till the Clouds Roll By (1946) (uncredited)
- The Trouble with Women (1947) (uncredited)
- Variety Girl (1947)
- Isn't It Romantic? (1948)
- Holiday in Havana (1949)
- The Big Wheel (1949)
- Tales of Robin Hood (1951)
