= Jon Manchip White =

American novelist (1924–2013)

Jon Ewbank Manchip White
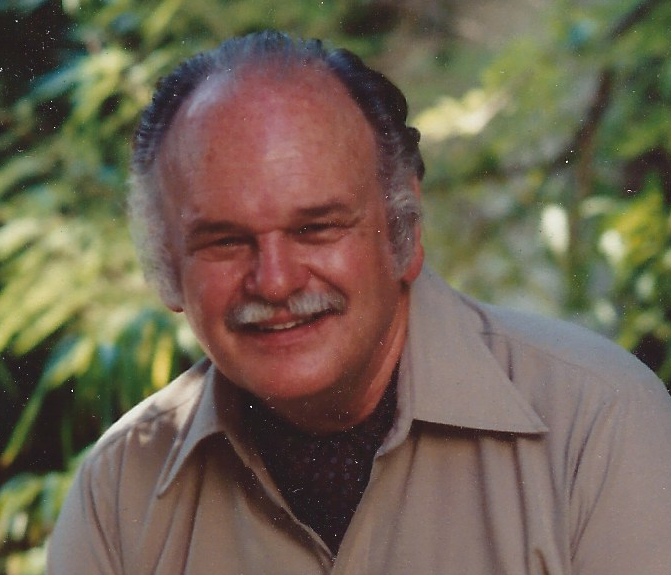
- Born: June 22, 1924; Cardiff, Wales
- Died: July 31, 2013 (aged 89); Knoxville, Tennessee, U.S.
- Citizenship: American
- Education: University of Cambridge
- Writing career
- Language: English
- Genres: Fiction, nonfiction, poetry, plays and screenplays

Jon Ewbank Manchip White (22 June 1924 – July 31, 2013) was the Welsh American author of more than thirty books of non-fiction and fiction, including The Last Race, Nightclimber, Death By Dreaming, Solo Goya, and his final novel, Rawlins White: Patriot to Heaven, published in 2011. White was also the author of a number of plays, teleplays, screenplays and volumes of short stories and poetry.

== Biography ==
White was born in 1924 in Cardiff, Wales, to shipping company owner Gwilym Manchip White. When White was young his father contracted tuberculosis, and at the age of eight White was sent away to boarding school in England to reduce his risk of infection.

White did well enough in school to earn an Exhibition in English to St Catharine's College, Cambridge in 1941, and studied there until enrolling in the Royal Navy in 1943 to fight in World War II. After initially putting to sea helping to ferry men and supplies across the English Channel, White joined the Welsh Guards, where he served until the end of the war. On VE Day, White met his future wife, nurse Valerie Leighton. They have two daughters, Bronwen (Bronwen White) and Rhiannon (Rhiannon White Kirkpatrick) whom they named for characters in The Mabinogion, the book of Welsh mythology.

White returned to Cambridge after his military service, and in 1950 he graduated with an Honours degree in English, prehistoric archaeology, and oriental languages, receiving a diploma in anthropology. White's Egyptology studies earned him an offer to work for the Keeper of the Egyptian and Assyrian Department at the British Museum, but he opted instead to become a story editor for the newly created BBC Television Service, where he read scripts and worked on episodes of his own, including serial adaptations of Elizabeth Gaskell's Cranford and his own Witch Hunt, famous - or notorious - for depicting the first, if brief, scene of a group of men and women, all naked, engaged in sexual congress.

After a brief stint in the British Foreign Service, White went back to writing for television and film, including five years spent travelling and living in places such as Madrid and Paris, as a script doctor with Samuel Bronston Productions. There amongst other Bronston productions, he made contributions to such epic films as El Cid and 55 Days at Peking. He was also a script doctor on the science fiction film The Day of the Triffids. Later he finished his movie career as Walt Disney's European story editor, based in Berlin. By 1962, White was back to writing for television, including writing an episode of The Avengers (Series 2 episode).

Throughout his film and television career, White was a prolific writer of novels and nonfiction, including books on travel, art and anthropology. In 1967 White left screenwriting and the UK behind to move to the United States and become writer-in-residence at the University of Texas at El Paso, where he began the school's creative writing department and eventually became a full professor. Ten years later White was hired by the Department of English at the University of Tennessee at Knoxville, where he became the Lindsay Young Professor of English and founded another creative writing department. He was professor emeritus at the University of Tennessee, Phi Beta Kappa, a member of the Texas Institute of Letters and of the Welsh Academy.

== Selected filmography ==
- Mask of Dust (1954) (adapted from his novel The Last Race; released in the US as Race for Life)
- A Day of Grace (1956)
- The Camp on Blood Island (1958)
- Mystery Submarine (1963) (a.k.a. Decoy)
- Crack in the World (1965)
- Naked Evil (1966) (a.k.a. Exorcism at Midnight in the US; based on his teleplay The Obi)

== Bibliography ==
=== Fiction ===
- The Last Race • London (Hodder & Stoughton, 1953) New York (Mill, 1953) Also: made into the feature film Mask of Dust, which White co-wrote)
- Build Us A Dam • London (Hodder & Stoughton, 1955) Also: Corgi Books
- The Girl from Indiana • London (Hodder & Stoughton, 1956)
- No Home but Heaven • London (Hodder & Stoughton, 1957)
- The Mercenaries • London (Long, 1958) Also: Arrow Books and Major Books
- Hour of the Rat • London (Hutchinson, 1962) Also: Digit Books
- The Rose in the Brandy Glass • London (Eyre & Spottiswoode, 1965)
- Nightclimber • London (Chatto & Windus, 1968) New York (Morrow, 1968) Also: Sphere Books and Ace Books
- The Game of Troy • London (Chatto & Windus, 1971) New York (McKay, 1971), Also: Dell Books
- The Garden Game • London (Hodder & Stoughton, 1973) Indianapolis (Bobbe Merrill, 1974) Also: Pinnacle Books
- Send for Mr. Robinson • New York (Pinnacle, 1974) London (Panther, 1974)
- The Moscow Papers • Canoga Park, CA (Major Books, 1979)
- Death by Dreaming • Cambridge, MA (Apple-Wood Books, 1981)
- Fevers and Chills • Woodstock, VT (Foul Play Press, 1983 - Omnibus edition, featuring Nightclimber, The Game of Troy, and The Garden Game.
- The Last Grand Master • Woodstock, VT (Countryman Press, 1985)
- Whistling Past the Churchyard • New York (Atlantic Monthly Press, 1992 - collection of short stories)
- Echoes and Shadows • UK (Tartarus Press, 2003 - collection of short stories)
- Solo Goya • Oak Ridge, TN (Iris Press, 2007)
- Rawlins White: Patriot To Heaven • Oak Ridge, TN (Iris Press, 2011)
- The Bird with Silver Wings • (Iris Press, 2012 - a collection of musically themed short stories)

=== Nonfiction ===
- Ancient Egypt • London (Allen Wingate, 1952), New York (Crowell, 1953) London (Allen & Unwin, 1970)
- Anthropology • London (English Universities Press, 1954), New York (Philosophical Library, 1954)
- Marshal of France: The Life and times of Maurice, Comte de Saxe • London (Hamish Hamilton, 1962) Chicago (Rand McNally, 1962)
- Everyday Life in Ancient Egypt • London (Batsford, 1964) New York (Putman, 1965; Peter Bedrick, 1991, Also: Capricorn Books)
- Diego Velázques, Painter and Courtier • London (Hamish Hamilton, 1969) Chicago (Rand McNally, 1969)
- The Land God Made in Anger: Reflections on a Journey through South West Africa • London (Allen & Unwin, 1969) Chicago (Rand McNally, 1969)
- Cortés and the Downfall of the Aztec Empire • London (Hamish Hamilton, 1971) New York (St. Martin's Press, 1971; Carroll & Graf, 1989)
- A World Elsewhere: One Man’s Fascination with the American Southwest • New York (Crowell, 1975) London (as The Great American Desert - Allen & Unwin, 1976) Texas (Texas A&M Press, 1988)
- Everyday Life of the North American Indians • London (Batsford, 1979) New York (Holmes & Meier, 1979; Dorset Press, 1989)
- What to Do When the Russians Come: A Survivors’ Handbook (with Robert Conquest)• New York (Stein & Day, 1984)
- The Journeying Boy: Scenes from a Welsh Childhood • New York (Atlantic Monthly Press, 1991)

=== As editor ===
- Life in Ancient Egypt by Adolf Erman • New York (Dover, 1970)
- The Tomb of Tutankhamun by Howard Carter • New York (Dover, 1972)
- Manners and Customs of the Modern Egyptians by E. W. Lane • New York (Dover, 1973)
- Egypt & The Holy Land: Historic Photographs by Francis Frith (with Julia van Haaften) • New York (Dover, 1981) London (Constable, 1982)
- A History of the Ancient Egyptians by James Henry Breasted • New York (Peter Bedrick, 1991)
- Introduction to Old Calabria by Norman Douglas • Vermont (Marlboro Books, 1993)
- Introduction to Travels with a Donkey in the Cévennes by Robert Louis Stevenson • Illinois (Marlboro/Northwestern, 1996)

=== Poetry collections ===
- Dragon and Other Poems • London (Fortune Press, 1943)
- Salamander and Other Poems • London (Fortune Press, 1945)
- The Rout of San Romano • Aldington, Kent (Hand & Flower Press, 1952)
- The Mountain Lion • London (Chatto & Windus, 1971) in the Phoenix Living Poets series

=== Original Movies, Television and Radio Plays ===
- Avengers
- Camp on Blood Island
- Chariot of Fire
- The Circuit
- The Colonel
- Concerto for the Left Hand
- Counsel for the Queen
- Crack in the World
- Day of Grace
- Hour of the Rat
- Decoy
- Man with a Dog
- Mask of Dust
- Musk of Amber
- Mystery Submarine
- The Obi
- A Question of Honour
- The Rose in the Brandy Glass
- Second Fiddle
- Souvenir
- Victorian House
- Who Killed Menna Lorraine?
- Witch Hunt
- Wolf Pack

=== Television and Radio Adaptations ===
- Ace High (Peter Fleming)
- The Collection (Stefan Zweig)
- Cranford (Mrs. Gaskell)
- Journey to the Center of the Earth (Jules Verne)
- The Family Honour (Laurence Housman)
- Journey into Fear (Eric Ambler)
- Mrs. Dane's Defence (Henry Arthur Jones)
- Paolo and Francesca (Stephen Phillips)
- The Pistol Shot (Pushkin)
- The Reverberator (Henry James)
- The Wages of Fear (Georges Arnaud)
- The War of the Worlds (H.G. Wells)
- Witness for the Prosecution (Agatha Christie)

=== Compensated Contributor ===
- El Cid
- Fall of the Roman Empire
- 55 Days at Peking
- Day of the Triffids
- The Thin Red Line
- Steel Bayonet
- Ten Seconds to Hell
- Frankenstein and Sherlock Holmes Films

=== Biographical Entries ===
Contemporary Authors Autobiography Series • Contemporary Novelists • Dictionary of International Biography • International Authors' Who's Who • Who's Who in America • Who's Who in the West and Southwest • Personalities of the South • Outstanding Educators of America • Twentieth Century Crime and Mystery Writers • The Writers Directory
