= The Big Wheel (film) =

1949 film by Edward Ludwig

- Directed by: Edward Ludwig
- Written by: Robert Smith
- Produced by: Mort Briskin; Samuel H. Stiefel
- Starring: Mickey Rooney; Thomas Mitchell; Mary Hatcher; Michael O'Shea
- Cinematography: Ernest Laszlo
- Edited by: Walter Thompson
- Music by: Gerard Carbonara; Nat W. Finston; John Leipold
- Color process: Black and white
- Production companies: Samuel H. Stiefel Productions; Popkin-Stiefel-Dempsey Productions
- Distributed by: United Artists
- Release date: November 4, 1949
- Running time: 92 minutes
- Country: United States
- Language: English
- Budget: $900,000
- Box office: $1.5 million

The Big Wheel

The Big Wheel is a 1949 American drama sport film directed by Edward Ludwig starring Mickey Rooney, Thomas Mitchell, Mary Hatcher and Michael O'Shea. It includes the final screen appearance of Hattie McDaniel.

This film is now in the public domain.

== Plot ==
Billy Coy (Mickey Rooney) arrives in the town of Carrell, California and offers himself as a mechanic for Arthur "Red" Stanley (Thomas Mitchell) at his garage. Red turns down Billy initially, but after seeing a photo of his father, "Cannonball" Coy, a famous driver, Red scares up a job for Billy. Billy's father died in an accident at the Indianapolis 500 several years previously. Red was Cannonball's mechanic, riding with him the day he died in the north turn of the Indianapolis motor speedway. Red inquires after "her"; he still carries a torch for Mary (Spring Byington), Cannonball's widow and Billy's mother.

At the garage, Billy befriends a tomboy, Louise Riley (Mary Hatcher), whose father owns the nearest racetrack. Billy gets a chance to prove his skills as a driver in a qualifying race, but he is too arrogant to follow his employer's advice and is unsuccessful. He asks Louise to meet on Saturday night at the track. Thinking it is a date, Louise does the unheard of for her—she buys a dress and heels (in which she is unskilled at walking), assisted by her family's maid (Hattie McDaniel). As it turns out, Billy needed her help with changing some carburetors, much to Louise's disappointment. She gamely wobbles on high heels with him to the garage, buoyed by her love of cars and affection for Billy.

Billy gets another chance to drive for another car owner, Deacon Jones. The car is green and referred to as a "Hoodoo Wagon" due to a racing superstition that green cars are unlucky. A helpful gadfly in the pits reminds Billy this is the same color as the car his father drove when he crashed and burned. Billy drives but is pushed off the track by driver Vic Sullivan (Michael O'Shea). Billy survives the crash but fails to qualify. He vents his frustration at the dirty trick by punching Vic. Distracted by the spectacle, another driver injures his hand by absentmindedly placing it on the searing exhaust pipe of his car in which he's sitting; Billy is offered the opportunity to drive in the incapacitated man's stead.

Billy wins the next race and continues driving for Jones. Together with his team's other driver, Happy Lee (Steve Brodie), they make headlines with their success. Billy gets arrested for speeding after he has too much to drink. Red bails him out, and contrary to Red's advice, Billy goes on to race that same night.

When the left rear wheel in Happy's car breaks, Billy tries desperately to catch up to Happy and alert him but instead crashes into Happy's car after the wheel comes off. The car skids to a stop in Billy's path. Happy's car is smashed through the wall, rupturing the gas tank and the car bursts into flames. Despite Billy's frantic efforts to save him, Happy dies in the blaze. After the race, the other drivers avoid Billy, convinced Billy made good his tyro promise to "...drive over them" and he is fired from Jones's garage. Billy decides to move "back east, where the big cars and the big money are."

Billy stays in contact with Louise, and starts fresh as a race car driver. In his absence, his mother and Red get married.

On the day of the next Indianapolis 500 race, Mary, Red and Louise turn out to support Billy. He drives one of Red's cars and leads, but on the final lap Billy drives through flaming gasoline from a wreck which causes Billy's engine to catch fire. Battling the smoke, Billy finishes the race, taking third place, leaping from the car just before it explodes. Billy is bitterly disappointed not to have won, especially since without a winning purse Red can't afford to race again. To Billy's delight, in a show of great sportsmanship, the winner insists officials give the trophy to Billy for his bravery.

== Cast ==
- Mickey Rooney as Billy Coy
- Thomas Mitchell as Arthur "Red" Stanley
- Mary Hatcher as Louise Riley
- Michael O'Shea as Victor "Vic" Sullivan
- Spring Byington as Mary Coy
- Hattie McDaniel as Minnie (billed as Hattie McDaniels)
- Steve Brodie as "Happy" Lee
- Lina Romay as Dolores Raymond
- Allen Jenkins as George
- Richard Lane as Reno Riley (billed as Dick Lane)
- Eddie Kane as Head Waiter
- Charles Irwin as Drunk
- Kippee Valez as Carla
- Denver Pyle as Doctor
- George Fisher as Announcer
- Jackson King as Announcer (billed as Jack Colin)

== Production ==
Rooney returned from the war and made four films for MGM. He wanted to enter independent production and MGM agreed provided he promise to make five films for them.

In April 1949 Rooney announced he would make four films in partnership with producer Sam Stiefel of which Big Wheel would be the first, directed by Edward Ludwig based on a story by Robert Smith. It would be followed by Buckaroo based on an idea by Rooney, and Quicksand.

The agreement between Rooney and Stiefel ended before Rooney had made a film due to a financial disagreement. Rooney agreed to make three films for Stiefel as a salaried employee. The producer said Rooney owed him $180,000 and he was paying Rooney $100,000 a film; he was to pay it off at $60,000 a film, and thus would only get $40,000 cash.

Filming started 21 June 1949. Wilbur Shaw acted as technical adviser. Rooney's character was based on Mauri Rose.

In August 1949 it was announced the film would be produced by Stifel, Harry Popkin and Jack Dempsey.

== Reception ==
The film was previewed in November 1949.

The Los Angeles Times said the track scenes were "thrilling".

== Lawsuit ==
In January 1950 driver Bill Holland sued Rooney, Dempsey, Popkin, Stifel and his brother for $250,000 in damages claiming the film was based on the 1949 Indianapolis 500. Holland won the race and argued the film damaged his reputation by implying he won by a fluke.

== See also ==
- Public domain film
- List of American films of 1949
- List of films in the public domain in the United States
