= Tales of Robin Hood =

1951 film by James Tinling

Tales of Robin Hood is a 1951 American film directed by James Tinling, written by Leroy H. Zehren and starring Robert Clarke and Mary Hatcher, based on the English folklore character Robin Hood.

== Plot ==
Before a Saxon earl dies at the hands of a Norman assassin, he beseeches his friend Will to take the earl's young son into Sherwood Forest. The boy grows to become Robin Hood. The Lord of Clairmont sends an assassin to capture Robin. An archery contest is held in order to attract Robin, but he arrives in disguise and easily wins the tournament. Clairmont's ward Maid Marian is captured by bandits, but she is rescued by Robin and his men. Clairmont's men raid Robin's camp and retake Marian, only to have Robin and his men storm the castle to reclaim her.

== Cast ==
- Robert Clarke as Robin Hood
- Mary Hatcher as Maid Marian
- Paul Cavanagh as Sir Guy de Clairmont
- Wade Crosby as Little John
- Whit Bissell as Will Stutely
- Ben Welden as Friar Tuck
- Robert Bice as Will Scarlet
- Keith Richards as Sir Alan de Beaulieu
- Bruce Lester as Alan-a-Dale
- Tiny Stowe as Sheriff of Nottingham

== Production ==
The project was conceived as a pilot for a television series produced by Hal Roach Jr. in partnership with Robert L. Lippert. Roach was interested in television production while Lippert was interested in feature films for theaters. Their plan was to produce 12 hour-long feature films for theaters compiled from 30-minute television productions. However, only two feature films resulted: Tales of Robin Hood and the military comedy As You Were. Lippert canceled the arrangement when the Screen Actors Guild, the Screen Writers Guild and the American Federation of Musicians demanded extra compensation for the dual-media distribution plan.

Filming began on July 1, 1951, with a release date of December 21, 1951. The film's release occurred just prior to Walt Disney's live-action Technicolor feature The Story of Robin Hood and His Merrie Men.

Roach rushed the television series into distribution while the film was still in release, causing Lippert to launch a formal protest against him.

== Reception ==
Motion Picture Herald rated the film as suitable "for the lower half" of a double-feature program: "With slight variations, this presents the slightly worn and vey familiar Robin Hood yarn, with the accent on the type of action and dialogue that appeals to the younger set.

== Sequel ==
Shortly after the film's release in September 1951, Hal Roach Jr. announced a sequel to be titled Robin of Sherwood, with Robert Clarke again in the lead role and James Tinling retained as director. Production was scheduled to begin November, but the project did not materialize.

== See also ==
- List of films and television series featuring Robin Hood
