= Mari Aldon =

Lithuanian-American actress (1925–2004)

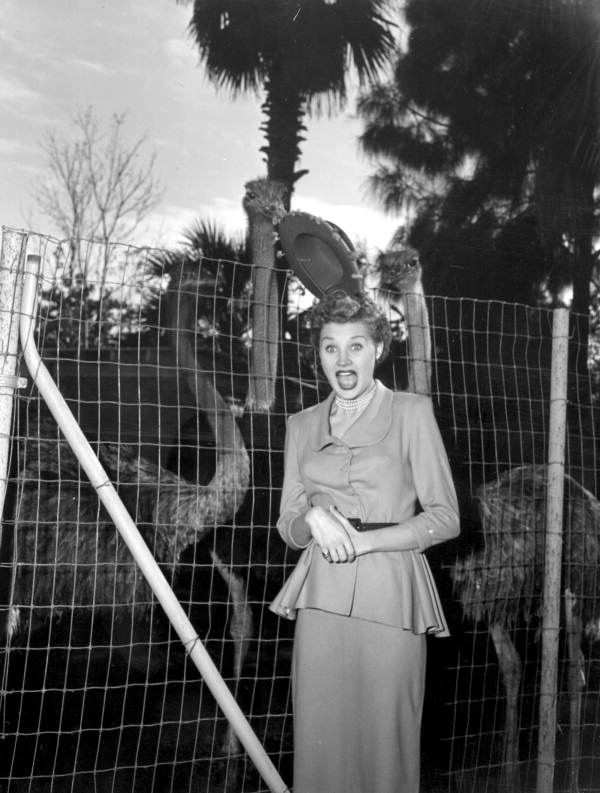
- Aldon at the Florida premiere of Distant Drums (1951)
- Born: Aldona Pauliutė; 17 November 1925; Tauragė, Lithuania
- Died: 31 October 2004 (aged 78); Las Vegas, Nevada, U.S.
- Citizenship: Lithuanian; American
- Occupation: Actress
- Years active: 1946–1968
- Spouse: Tay Garnett (m. 1953; died 1977)
- Children: 1

Mari Aldon (born Marija Aldona Pauliutė; 17 November 1925 – 31 October 2004) was an American actress of Lithuanian origin.

== Early life ==
Mari Aldon was born in Tauragė, Lithuania. Her father Antanas Paulius was a policeman, mother Antanina (Antosė) Paulienė was a nurse. Father moved to America looking for a job. Soon after, when Mari was three years old, her mother also moved to Toronto, Canada with her daughter. There, she attended Givens Public School and Central High School. She studied ballet, drama, piano, and singing. Her early performances were noticed in Lithuanian newspapers of America. She had a sister.

== Career ==
Before Aldon began working in films, she acted for 11 months in a road company of A Streetcar Named Desire and danced with the Canadian Ballet. She also appeared on radio with Alan Young and on The Harold Peary Show.

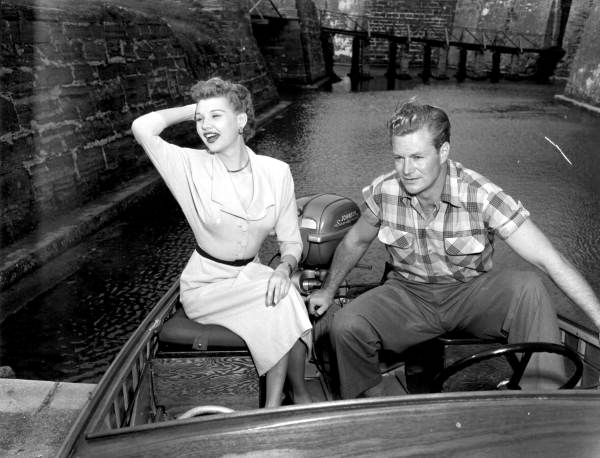
Aldon with Richard Webb at the Florida premiere of Distant Drums (1951)

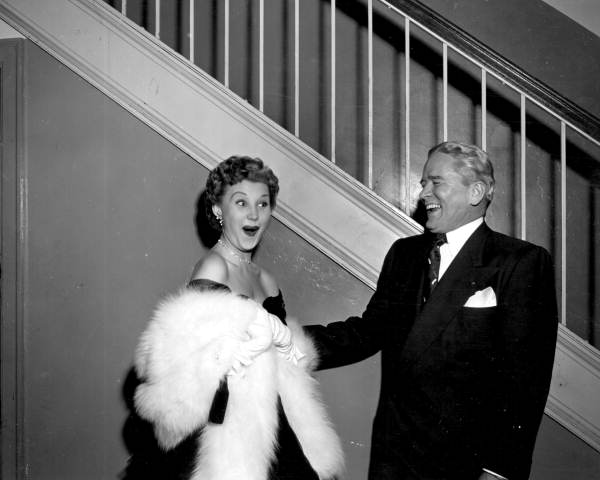
Aldon and Governor Warren at the premiere of Distant Drums in Saint Augustine, Florida, 1951

After making her screen debut in a minor role in The Locket (1946) she gradually evolved to playing supporting or lead roles. Her most notable performance was starring opposite Gary Cooper in the 1951 Western Distant Drums. By the mid-1950s she was appearing either in B Pictures like the British thriller Mask of Dust (1954) or in supporting roles in more expensive films such as David Lean's Summertime (1955).

After this point she worked largely in television, such as on the TV Western Wagon Train in 1959 as Freda Johnson in "The Vivian Carter Story" (S2E23) and in 1960 as Hester Millikan in "The Jeremy Dow Story" (S4E14). She guest-starred in a 1958 episode of Colgate Theatre and in a 1961 episode of Ichabod and Me. and as Ruby Kelley in a 1966 episode of Bonanza S7E30

== Personal life ==
Aldon married Tay Garnett in London, England on 13 August 1953. Their daughter, Tiela Aldon Garnett (later Daniels), was born in Los Angeles, California on 25 October 1955.

On 17 January 1958, Aldon became a US citizen. In August 1970, Aldon filed for divorce from Garnett in Los Angeles, she was widowed seven years later. Aldon and Garnett had a ranch, near King Vidor in Paso Robles, California. Close relatives still live in her hometown of Tauragė, Lithuania, with whom she kept in touch.

== Death ==
Aldon died on 31 October 2004 in Las Vegas, aged 78, of cancer.

== Filmography ==
Year	Title	Role	Notes
1946	The Locket	Mary	Uncredited
1947	Forever Amber	Bess	Scenes deleted
1948	A Woman's Vengeance	Girl	Uncredited
1951	Inside the Walls of Folsom Prison	Mrs. Daniels	Uncredited
1951	Tomorrow Is Another Day	Dance Hall Hostess	Uncredited
1951	The Tanks Are Coming	Patricia Kane	
1951	Distant Drums	Judy Beckett	
1952	This Woman Is Dangerous	Ann Jackson	
1953	Tangier Incident	Millicent	
1954	The Barefoot Contessa	Myrna	
1954	Mask of Dust	Patricia Wells	
1955	Summertime	Phyl Yaeger	
1968	Live a Little, Love a Little	Minor Role	Uncredited, (final film role)

== Bibliography ==
- Aaker, Everett. George Raft: The Films. McFarland, 2013.
