= Distant Drums =

1951 film by Raoul Walsh

- Theatrical release poster
- Directed by: Raoul Walsh
- Written by: Niven Busch; Martin Rackin
- Produced by: Milton Sperling
- Starring: Gary Cooper; Mari Aldon
- Cinematography: Sidney Hickox
- Edited by: Folmar Blangsted
- Music by: Max Steiner
- Production company: United States Pictures
- Distributed by: Warner Bros.
- Release date: December 25, 1951 (New York)
- Running time: 101 minutes
- Country: United States
- Language: English
- Box office: $2.85 million (US rentals)

Distant Drums is a 1951 American Florida Western film directed by Raoul Walsh and starring Gary Cooper. It is set during the Second Seminole War in the 1840s, with Cooper playing an American captain who successfully destroys a fort held by Spanish gunrunners and is pursued into the Everglades by a large group of Seminoles. The fort used in the film was the historic Castillo de San Marcos in St. Augustine, Florida, and most of the principal photography occurred on location in Florida.

== Plot ==
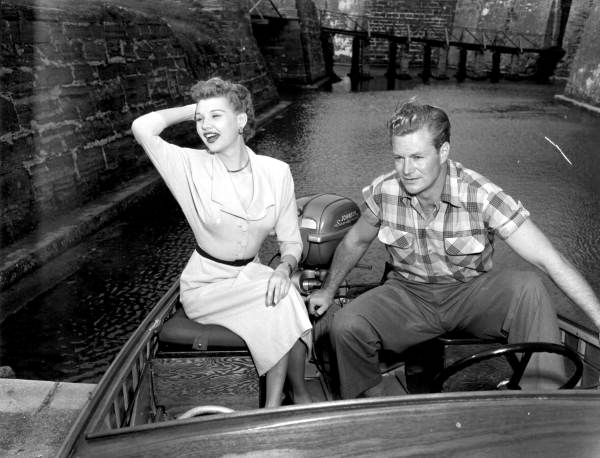
Mari Aldon and Richard Webb at the Castillo de San Marcos for the film's premiere.

During the Second Seminole War in 1840, American general Zachary Taylor sends naval lieutenant Tufts and scout Monk to a remote Florida island home, where the reclusive captain Quincy Wyatt lives with his five-year-old son. The soldiers' mission is to destroy an old Spanish fort being used as a base for Spanish gunrunners aiding the Seminoles, and they convince the reluctant Wyatt to lead the small strike force as Taylor had requested.

Wyatt and his men successfully destroy the fort and rescue a group of prisoners held there. One of them, Judy Beckett, develops romantic feelings for Wyatt as they flee from a large group of pursuing Seminoles through the Everglades. The journey is perilous and several of the troops are killed, including one who is attacked by an alligator and dragged underwater. Wyatt leads the survivors to his remote homestead, where he is shocked to discover that his home has been burned and his son is missing. Meanwhile, the pursuing Seminoles arrive nearby, and Wyatt challenges their chief, Ocala, to single combat. Wyatt kills him in an underwater fight and the Seminoles flee. Soon after, he discovers that his son had been taken to safety before his home had been attacked, and they are reunited.

== Cast ==
- Gary Cooper as Captain Quincy Wyatt
- Richard Webb as Lieutenant Tufts
- Mari Aldon as Judy Beckett
- Arthur Hunnicutt as Monk
- Carl Harbaugh as Duprez
- Ray Teal as Private Mohair
- Robert Barrat as General Zachary Taylor
- Bob Burns as Indian Boy (uncredited)
- Larry Carper as Chief Ocala (uncredited)
- Sheb Wooley as Private Jessup (uncredited)

== Reception ==
In a contemporary review for The New York Times, critic Bosley Crowther wrote: "Don't look for novel surprise in this United States Pictures job. Niven Busch and Martin Rackin, who wrote it, dug it out of their memories, by and large. And Raoul Walsh, who directed, did so in precisely the same way that he has been directing such pictures for a matter of some twenty-five years. That is to say, Mr. Cooper is kept steady and laconic throughout, the action is serio-comic and the pace is conventionally maintained."

== Legacy ==
Wilhelm Scream

During a scene in which a man is attacked by an alligator, his scream created the now famous sound effect known as the Wilhelm scream.
