= Connie Leon =

English singer, dancer and film actress

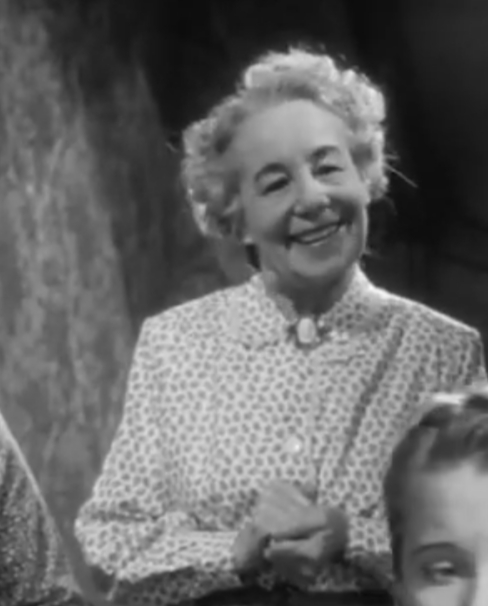
- Leon in That Brennan Girl (1947)
- Born: 1881; Cheshire, England
- Died: 10 May 1955 (aged 73–74); Los Angeles, California, U.S.
- Occupation: Actress

Connie Leon (1881 in Cheshire, England – 10 May 1955 in Los Angeles, California) was an English singer, dancer and film actress.

== Career ==
Between 1896 and 1909, Connie Leon was popular in provincial theatre as a singer, dancer and comedian, including pantomime and in soubrette roles.

In her 50s she started a successful career in Hollywood, acting in over 50 films between 1934 and 1949, though most of these were uncredited. She was best known for her parts in the 1940s films Mrs. Miniver, Forever and a Day and Bombs Over Burma.

== Selected filmography ==
- All Men Are Enemies (1934) - Maid (uncredited)
- One More River (1934) - Flower Woman (uncredited)
- Clive of India (1935) - Ayah (uncredited)
- Werewolf of London (1935) - Millie - Yogami's Housekeeper (uncredited)
- A Feather in Her Hat (1935) - Woman (uncredited)
- The Prince and the Pauper (1937) - (uncredited)
- The Great Garrick (1937) - Woman in Audience (uncredited)
- The Adventures of Robin Hood (1938) - Saxon Woman (uncredited)
- In Old Mexico (1938) - Servant (uncredited)
- The Rains Came (1939) - Nurse (uncredited)
- Honeymoon in Bali (1939) - Bill's Housekeeper on Bali (uncredited)
- We Are Not Alone (1939) - Mrs. Hart - Cockney Patient (uncredited)
- The Light That Failed (1939) - Flower Woman (uncredited)
- My Son, My Son! (1940) - Second Landlady
- The Westerner (1940) - Lily Langtry's Maid (uncredited)
- Where Did You Get That Girl? (1941) - Housewife (uncredited)
- Singapore Woman (1941) - Suwa
- The Wolf Man (1941) - Mrs. Wykes (uncredited)
- Bombay Clipper (1942) - Chambermaid (uncredited)
- Butch Minds the Baby (1942) - Minor Role (uncredited)
- This Above All (1942) - Minor Role (uncredited)
- Mrs. Miniver (1942) - Simpson
- Bombs Over Burma (1942) - Ma Sing
- Tales of Manhattan (1942) - Mary (Rogers sequence) (uncredited)
- Thunder Birds (1942) - Ellen (uncredited)
- Cat People (1942) - Neighbor Who Called Police (uncredited)
- Forever and a Day (1943) - Wartime Londoner
- The Moon Is Down (1943) - Villager (uncredited)
- Behind the Rising Sun (1943) - Tama's Mother (uncredited)
- Sweet Rosie O'Grady (1943) - Charwoman (uncredited)
- The Song of Bernadette (1943) - Townswoman (uncredited)
- The Lodger (1944) - Woman (uncredited)
- Uncertain Glory (1944) - Bonet's Maid (uncredited)
- Going My Way (1944) - Mrs. Quimp's Neighbor (uncredited)
- Ministry of Fear (1944) - Lady Purchaser of Cake (uncredited)
- The Pearl of Death (1944) - Ellen Carey (uncredited)
- Reckless Age (1944) - Old Lady (uncredited)
- My Buddy (1944) - Housekeeper (uncredited)
- And Now Tomorrow (1944) - Hester (uncredited)
- Hangover Square (1945) - Maid (uncredited)
- The Brighton Strangler (1945) - Mrs. Cllive - the Mayor's Wife (uncredited)
- A Bell for Adano (1945) - Italian Woman (uncredited)
- Love Letters (1945) - Nurse (uncredited)
- Three Strangers (1946) - Flower Woman (uncredited)
- Anna and the King of Siam (1946) - Beebe (uncredited)
- Of Human Bondage (1946) - Nurse (uncredited)
- The Locket (1946) - Tina - Bonner Maid (uncredited)
- That Brennan Girl (1946) - Miss Jane, Merryman Resident
- Smash-Up, the Story of a Woman (1947) - Mary, Angie's Maid (uncredited)
- Moss Rose (1947) - Seamstress (uncredited)
- The Woman in White (1948) - Village Woman (uncredited)
- Julia Misbehaves (1948) - Woman in Street (uncredited)
- Challenge to Lassie (1949) - Mrs. Traill (uncredited) (final film role)
