= Variety Girl =

1947 film by George Marshall

- Directed by: George Marshall
- Written by: Monte Brice; Edmund Hartmann; Frank Tashlin; Robert L. Welch
- Produced by: Danny Dare
- Starring: Mary Hatcher; Olga San Juan; DeForest Kelley; Frank Ferguson; Glenn Tryon; Nella Walker; Torben Meyer; Jack Norton; William Demarest
- Cinematography: Lionel Lindon; Stuart Thompson
- Edited by: LeRoy Stone
- Music by: Joseph J. Lilley; Troy Sanders
- Distributed by: Paramount Pictures
- Release date: August 29, 1947
- Running time: 93 minutes
- Country: United States
- Language: English
- Box office: $3.6 million (US rentals)

Variety Girl is a 1947 American musical comedy film directed by George Marshall and starring Mary Hatcher, Olga San Juan, DeForest Kelley, Frank Ferguson, Glenn Tryon, Nella Walker, Torben Meyer, Jack Norton, and William Demarest. It was produced by Paramount Pictures. Numerous Paramount contract players and directors make cameos or perform songs, with particularly large amounts of screen time featuring Bing Crosby and Bob Hope. Among many others, the studio contract players include Gary Cooper, Alan Ladd, Paulette Goddard, Ray Milland, William Holden, Burt Lancaster, Robert Preston, Veronica Lake, William Bendix, Barbara Stanwyck and Paula Raymond.

== Overview ==
The opening caption reads, "This picture is dedicated to Variety Clubs, International, "The Heart of Show Business", which beats constantly in behalf of the under-privileged children of the world ... regardless of race, creed or color". The story revolves around two young girls who exchange identities, causing confusion at the Variety Club (show-business charity) and the Paramount studio.

The elaborate closing song, "Harmony," begins with Bing Crosby and Bob Hope singing and dancing on stage in matching checkered suits and straw hats, eventually moves to a merry-go-round with Gary Cooper in cowboy regalia seated on a plastic horse while talking through a couple of stanzas with Barry Fitzgerald, then gradually incorporates the entire cast, which includes almost everyone under contract to Paramount at the time, in a rousing finale launched by William Holden and Ray Milland chasing a scantily-clad woman across a soundstage.

The film includes a five-minute color Puppetoon segment Romeow and Julicat by George Pal in Technicolor which is in black and white in most prints.

== Cast ==
- Mary Hatcher as Catherine Brown
- Olga San Juan as Amber La Vonne
- DeForest Kelley as Bob Kirby
- Frank Ferguson as R.J. O'Connell
- Glenn Tryon as Bill Farris
- Nella Walker as Mrs. Webster
- Torben Meyer as Andre
- Jack Norton as Busboy at Brown Derby
- William Demarest as Barker
- Frank Faylen as Stage manager

=== Celebrity appearances ===
- Bing Crosby
- Bob Hope
- Gary Cooper
- Ray Milland
- Alan Ladd
- Barbara Stanwyck
- Paulette Goddard
- Dorothy Lamour
- Sonny Tufts
- Joan Caulfield
- William Holden
- Lizabeth Scott
- Burt Lancaster
- Gail Russell
- Diana Lynn
- Sterling Hayden
- Robert Preston
- Veronica Lake
- Pearl Bailey
- John Lund
- William Bendix
- George Pal
- Barry Fitzgerald
- Howard Da Silva
- Macdonald Carey
- Cass Daley
- Spike Jones & His City Slickers
- Patric Knowles
- Mona Freeman
- Cecil Kellaway
- Virginia Field
- Richard Webb
- Frank Faylen
- Cecil B. DeMille
- Mitchell Leisen
- George Marshall
- Paula Raymond
- George Reeves
- Wanda Hendrix
- Stanley Clements
- Walter Abel
- Pinto Colvig

== Reception ==
Variety wrote that the film "emerges a socko entertainment . . . [Hope] and Crosby click with their "Harmony" routine, a socko number for all its paraphrasing of the "Friendship" routine out of Du Barry Was a Lady which Bert Lahr and Ethel Merman made famous. The New York Times review of October 16, 1947 concluded: "The people who carry along the story are not to be overlooked for they bring to the effort the right spirit of good-natured abandon. Mary Hatcher, who was discovered in Oklahoma!, is a very welcome addition to the screen's songbird assembly, and she has a wide-eyed innocent look which won't hurt her either. Variety Girl is hodge-podge, to be sure. But let's not quibble about its lack of form, because it is a hearty slam-bang entertainment wherein the good very definitely outweighs the poor." Mae Tinée of the Chicago Daily Tribune wrote, "It would be difficult to select any one of this amiable aggregation for special honors."

== Soundtrack ==
- "Tallahassee" (Frank Loesser): sung by Alan Ladd, Dorothy Lamour and others
- "Harmony" (Jimmy Van Heusen / Johnny Burke): sung by Bing Crosby, Bob Hope and others
- "Tired" (Allan Roberts / Doris Fisher): sung by Pearl Bailey
- "He Can Waltz" (Frank Loesser): sung by Mary Hatcher
- "Your Heart Calling Mine" (Frank Loesser): sung by Mary Hatcher and Spike Jones and his City Slickers
- "Romeow and Julicat" (Edward H. Plumb): performed by Mary Hatcher, Pinto Colvig, and chorus
- "I Must Have Been Madly in Love" (Frank Loesser)
- "I Want My Money Back" (Frank Loesser)
- "Impossible Things" (Frank Loesser)
- "The French" (Frank Loesser)

The song "Tallahassee" appeared in the Billboard charts with recordings by Bing Crosby and The Andrews Sisters (#10 position) and by Dinah Shore and Woody Herman (#15 spot).

== See also ==
- List of films featuring fictional films
