= William D. Russell (director) =

American film and television director

William D. Russell (April 30, 1908 – April 1, 1968) was an American film and television director.

== Biography ==
Born in Indianapolis, Indiana on April 30, 1908, he began his Hollywood career with the 1940 as a dialogue director. In 1945, he directed his first film (a short) Hollywood Victory Caravan. His career in film ended with his last film, 1951's Best of the Badmen. In the early fifties, he began directing for television with Screen Gems, and his many credits include episodes of Father Knows Best (he was with the show from 1954 to 1956), Dennis the Menace, Perry Mason, Hazel, Bewitched, The Farmer's Daughter, and Family Affair.

Russell was nominated for three Emmys, first for You Are There in 1953, second for The Farmer's Daughter in 1964, and later for Family Affair in 1967. His directorial career ended shortly before his death in April 1968.
