= Dear Ruth =

1944 Broadway play by Norman Krasna

- Written by: Norman Krasna
- Original language: English
- Genre: Comedy
- Setting: The living-room of the Wilkins home, Kew Gardens, Long Island. Late Summer, 1944.

Premiere
- Date premiered: December 13, 1944
- Place premiered: Henry Millers Theatre, Broadway

Dear Ruth is a successful 1944 Broadway play written by Norman Krasna. It ran for 680 performances.

== History ==
Krasna wrote a serious play, The Man with Blond Hair, which received a tepid response. He said that Moss Hart suggested he write a commercial comedy instead along the lines of Junior Miss. Krasna based the family in the play on that of Groucho Marx, who was a good friend and occasional collaborator.

The play was named in honor of Krasna's first wife, Ruth.

The original production of the play was directed by Moss Hart and starred John Dall. It was a big success, running for 680 performances.

Film rights were sold for a reported $450,000 with the proviso that a movie not be made until the play finished a two-year run. The film, also titled Dear Ruth, premiered on June 10, 1947.

Dear Ruth was also published as an Armed Services Edition, distributed to American servicemen during World War II.
