= Janie Gets Married =

1946 film by Vincent Sherman

- Theatrical release poster
- Directed by: Vincent Sherman
- Screenplay by: Agnes Christine Johnston
- Based on: Janie; 1942 play by Josephine Bentham; Herschel V. Williams, Jr.
- Produced by: Alex Gottlieb
- Starring: Joan Leslie; Robert Hutton; Edward Arnold; Ann Harding; Robert Benchley; Dorothy Malone
- Cinematography: Carl E. Guthrie
- Edited by: Christian Nyby
- Music by: Friedrich Hollaender
- Color process: Black and white
- Production company: Warner Bros. Pictures
- Distributed by: Warner Bros. Pictures
- Release date: June 22, 1946
- Running time: 89 minutes
- Country: United States
- Language: English

Janie Gets Married is a 1946 American comedy film directed by Vincent Sherman, and written by Agnes Christine Johnston. The film stars Joan Leslie, Robert Hutton, Edward Arnold, Ann Harding, Robert Benchley, and Dorothy Malone. The film was released by Warner Bros. Pictures on June 22, 1946.

This is a sequel to 1944's Janie. Hutton, Arnold, Harding, and Benchley reprise their earlier roles, but Leslie replaces actress Joyce Reynolds in the title role.

== Plot ==
Dick Lawrence returns home from the Army and agrees to marry sweetheart Janie Conway, despite a month-to-month marital contract she has drawn up. Dick is also unaware that Janie is scheming to advance his career at her father Charles Conway's newspaper.

Janie doesn't mind the arrival of soldier acquaintance "Spud" until it turns out Spud is an attractive former WAC. Things get further complicated when Spud is invited by Dick to spend a few days at their home, and when Janie's tomboy sister Elsbeth threatens to tell Dick what's really going on at the newspaper.

After attempting to make her husband jealous by demonstrating an interest in "Scooper," another military pal of his. Janie is caught kissing him, which nearly scuttles the sale of the paper until Elsbeth, of all people, saves the day for her sister.

== Cast ==
- Joan Leslie as Janie Conway
- Robert Hutton as Dick Lawrence
- Edward Arnold as Charles Conway
- Ann Harding as Lucille Conway
- Robert Benchley as John Van Brunt
- Dorothy Malone as Sgt. Spud Lee
- Richard Erdman as Lt. 'Scooper' Nolan
- Clare Foley as Elsbeth Conway
- Donald Meek as Harley P. Stowers
- Hattie McDaniel as April
- Barbara Brown as Thelma Van Brunt
- Margaret Hamilton as Mrs. Angles
- Ann Gillis as Paula Rainey
- Ruth Tobey as Bernadine Dodd
- William Frambes as 'Dead Pan' Hackett
