= Pilgrim Hill =

Pilgrim Hill may refer to:

- Pilgrim Hill (film), a 2013 Irish film
- Pilgrim Hill (Central Park), a hill in New York City
- A hostel in Lucaston, Tasmania

== See also ==
- Hurricane at Pilgrim Hill, film
