= Girls' School =

Girls' School may refer to:

- "Girls' School" (song), a 1977 single by Wings
- Girls' School (1938 film), a comedy film
- Girls' School (1950 film), a drama film
- Girls' School (1982 film), a Taiwanese film starring Tien Niu
- For the practice of separating schools by gender, see single-sex education
- Girlschool, a British heavy metal band
