= Always Together =

1947 film by Frederick de Cordova

- Theatrical release poster
- Directed by: Frederick de Cordova
- Written by: I. A. L. Diamond; Henry Ephron; Phoebe Ephron
- Produced by: Alex Gottlieb
- Starring: Robert Hutton; Joyce Reynolds; Cecil Kellaway; Ernest Truex; Don McGuire; Ransom M. Sherman
- Cinematography: Carl E. Guthrie
- Edited by: Folmar Blangsted
- Music by: Werner R. Heymann
- Production company: Warner Bros. Pictures
- Distributed by: Warner Bros. Pictures
- Release date: December 10, 1947
- Running time: 78 minutes
- Country: United States
- Language: English

Always Together is a 1947 American comedy film directed by Frederick de Cordova and written by I. A. L. Diamond, Henry Ephron and Phoebe Ephron. The film stars Robert Hutton, Joyce Reynolds, Cecil Kellaway, Ernest Truex, Don McGuire and Ransom M. Sherman. The film was released by Warner Bros. Pictures on December 10, 1947.

== Plot ==
A millionaire on his deathbed leaves $1 million to Jane Barker, a film addict who believes life is like the movies. Jane gets married without telling her new husband about the inheritance. The millionaire gets better, and he wants his $1 million back. Throughout the film, Jane dreams her experiences are taking place in movies with real movie stars.

== Cast ==
- Robert Hutton as Donn Masters
- Joyce Reynolds as Jane Barker
- Cecil Kellaway as Jonathan Turner
- Ernest Truex as Mr. Timothy J. Bull
- Don McGuire as McIntyre
- Ransom M. Sherman as Judge
- Douglas Kennedy as Doberman

== Reception ==
Bosley Crowther of The New York Times wrote "Not that money lacks advantages, and not that the basic idea behind this silly little picture couldn't be brightly kicked around. But that hasn't been done in the hodge-podge of farcical situations here contrived, nor in the witless and unbeguiling acting of the juvenile principals. Joyce Reynolds is dewishly sophomoric as the girl who thinks money is a curse (even after she is given $1,000,000 by a dying millionaire) and Robert Hutton is merely collar-addled as her contrary-minded spouse. Against such childish opposition, Cecil Kellaway and Ernest Truex, two old hands at ripping up farce scripts and scenery, pretty well have their reckless ways. Some of their clowning is enlivening but for the most part it is forced and dull. The Warners will have to do much better in arguing for money than this."
