= Rustlers on Horseback =

1950 film by Fred C. Brannon

- Directed by: Fred C. Brannon
- Written by: Richard Wormser
- Produced by: Gordon Kay
- Starring: Allan Lane; Claudia Barrett; Eddy Waller
- Cinematography: John MacBurnie
- Edited by: Robert M. Leeds
- Music by: Stanley Wilson
- Production company: Republic Pictures
- Distributed by: Republic Pictures
- Release date: October 23, 1950
- Running time: 60 minutes
- Country: United States
- Language: English

Rustlers on Horseback is a 1950 American Western film directed by Fred C. Brannon and starring Allan Lane, Claudia Barrett and Eddy Waller. The film's art direction was by Frank Arrigo.

== Cast ==
- Allan Lane as Marshal Rocky Lane
- Black Jack as Black Jack
- Eddy Waller as Nugget Clark
- Roy Barcroft as Leo Straykin
- Claudia Barrett as Carol Reynolds
- John Eldredge as George Parradine
- George Nader as Jack Reynolds
- Forrest Taylor as Josh Taylor
- John L. Cason as Henchman Murray
- Stuart Randall as Jake Clune
- Douglas Evans as Lawyer Ken Jordan
- Tom Monroe as Guard Outside Hotel
- George Lloyd as Postmaster
- Marshall Reed as 2nd Floor Guard Bill

== Bibliography ==
- Bernard A. Drew. Motion Picture Series and Sequels: A Reference Guide. Routledge, 2013.
