= Captive of Billy the Kid =

1952 film by Fred C. Brannon

- Theatrical release poster
- Directed by: Fred C. Brannon
- Written by: M. Coates Webster; Richard Wormser
- Produced by: Harry Keller
- Starring: Allan Lane; Grant Withers; Penny Edwards
- Cinematography: John MacBurnie
- Edited by: Robert M. Leeds
- Music by: Stanley Wilson
- Production company: Republic Pictures
- Distributed by: Republic Pictures
- Release date: January 21, 1952
- Running time: 54 minutes
- Country: United States
- Language: English

Captive of Billy the Kid is a 1952 American Western film directed by Fred C. Brannon and starring Allan Lane, Grant Withers and Penny Edwards.

The film's sets were designed by the art director Frank Arrigo.

== Cast ==
- Allan Lane as Marshal 'Rocky' Lane
- Black Jack as 'Rocky's' Horse
- Penny Edwards as Nancy McCreary
- Grant Withers as Van Stanley
- Clem Bevans as Skeeter Davis
- Roy Barcroft as Henchman Piute
- Clayton Moore as Paul Howard
- Mauritz Hugo as Randy Brown
- Garry Goodwin as Pete, Fake Deputy
- Frank McCarroll as 1st Deputy Marshal
- Richard Emory as Henchman Sam
- Steve Clark as Telegraph Operator
- Art Dillard as Nancy's Driver
- Bob Reeves as Henchman

== Bibliography ==
- Boggs, Johnny D. Billy the Kid on Film, 1911-2012. McFarland, 2013.
