= Savage Frontier =

Savage Frontier may refer to:

- The Savage Frontier, a 1988 accessory for the Dungeons & Dragons campaign setting Forgotten Realms
  - Savage Frontier (series), a 1991–92 video game series based on the accessory's setting
- Savage Frontier (film), a 1953 American western film
