= Rodeo King and the Senorita =

1951 film by Philip Ford

- Theatrical release poster
- Directed by: Philip Ford
- Screenplay by: John K. Butler
- Produced by: Melville Tucker
- Starring: Rex Allen; Mary Ellen Kay; Buddy Ebsen; Roy Barcroft; Tristram Coffin; Bonnie DeSimone
- Cinematography: Walter Strenge
- Edited by: Robert M. Leeds
- Music by: Stanley Wilson
- Production company: Republic Pictures
- Distributed by: Republic Pictures
- Release date: July 15, 1951
- Running time: 67 minutes
- Country: United States
- Language: English

Rodeo King and the Senorita is a 1951 American Western film directed by Philip Ford, written by John K. Butler and starring Rex Allen, Mary Ellen Kay, Buddy Ebsen, Roy Barcroft, Tristram Coffin and Bonnie DeSimone. The film was released on July 15, 1951 by Republic Pictures.

== Plot ==
Pablo Morales, part-owner of the Foster & Morales Wild West Show, is killed during a stunt on horseback. Steve Lacey plans to replace him in management and in the act. Pable is irate when learning that Rex Allen has been selected as the show's new star.

Pablo's young daughter Juanita likes Rex and his talented horse Koko. When another accident results in a potentially fatal broken leg for Koko, Rex and his sidekick Muscles Benton suspect foul play. Koko recovers, thanks to the care of Juanita and her governess Janet Wells, and Rex wants to give the horse to Juanita. After a fight with Lacey, he intends to leave until he learns that Juanita, now the show's co-owner, has just $2,000 left. After a lab analysis proves the chicanery involved, Foster shoots a sheriff, but Rex ensures that the guilty parties face punishment. Juanita is grateful and feels that Koko's rightful place is with Rex.

== Cast ==
- Rex Allen as Rex Allen
- Koko as Koko
- Mary Ellen Kay as Janet Wells
- Buddy Ebsen as Muscles Benton
- Roy Barcroft as Steve Lacey
- Tristram Coffin as Jack Foster
- Bonnie DeSimone as Juanita Morales
- Don Beddoe as Mr. Richards
- Jonathan Hale as Dr. Sands
- Harry Harvey, Sr. as Veterinarian
- Rory Mallinson as Sheriff Baxter
- Joseph Forte as Dr. Teal
- Buff Brady as Pablo Morales
