= Robert Hutton (actor) =

American actor (1920–1994)

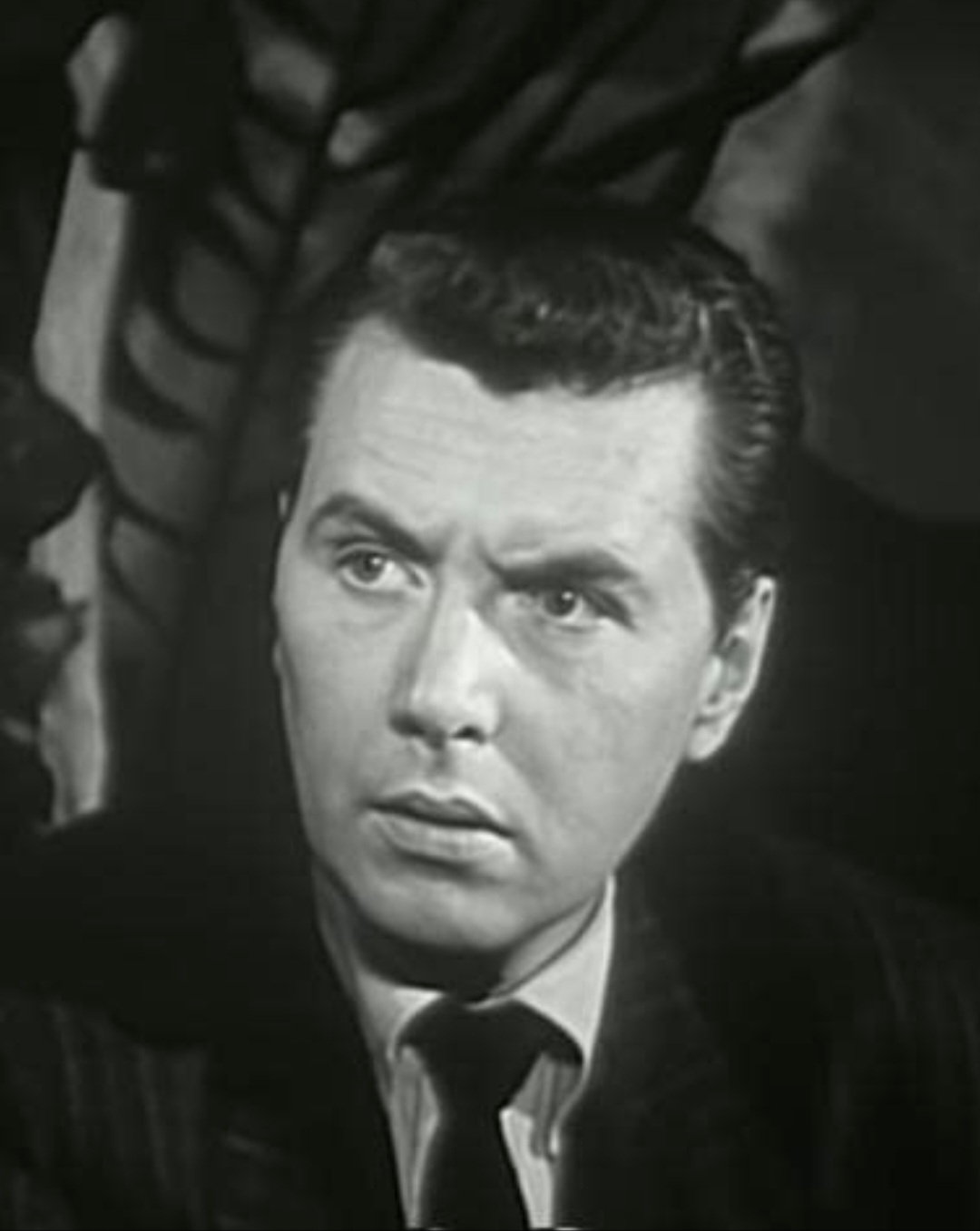
- Hutton in The Big Bluff (1955)
- Born: Robert Bruce Winne; June 11, 1920; Kingston, New York, U.S.
- Died: August 7, 1994 (aged 74); Kingston, New York, U.S.
- Resting place: Calvary Cemetery, Queens, New York
- Occupation: Actor
- Years active: 1943–1975
- Spouses: Natalie Thompson (m. 1943; div. 1945) Cleatus Caldwell (m. 1946; div. 1950) Bridget Carr (m. 1951; div. 1963): Audrey Emery (m. 1960s; div. 1960s); Rosemary Wooten (m. 1969)
- Children: 2

Robert Hutton (born Robert Bruce Winne; June 11, 1920 – August 7, 1994) was an American actor.

== Early life ==
Robert Bruce Winne was born in Kingston, New York, and he grew up in Ulster County, New York. He was the son of a hardware merchant and a cousin of the Woolworth heiress Barbara Hutton.

He attended Blair Academy, a small boarding school in Blairstown, New Jersey.

== Career ==
Before he ventured into films, Hutton acted at the Woodstock Playhouse in Woodstock, New York for two seasons. His film debut as Robert Hutton came in Destination Tokyo (1943).

Hutton resembled actor Jimmy Stewart: during World War II when Stewart enlisted in the Army Air Forces in March 1941, Hutton benefited from "victory casting" in roles that would ordinarily have gone to Stewart. His final film was The New Roof (1975).

After leaving Warner Brothers’ studios Hutton continued working in movies, TV shows and as a writer and director in England for several years. He returned years later to the United States and lived in New York where he was born and raised.

== Personal life ==
Hutton had a daughter and a son. He spent his last days in a nursing care facility after breaking his back in a home accident.

He died of pneumonia in 1994.

He is interred in Calvary Cemetery in Queens, New York.

== Selected filmography ==
- Northern Pursuit (1943) as Internment Camp Guard (uncredited)
- Destination Tokyo (1943) as Tommy Adams
- Janie (1944) as Pfc. Dick Lawrence
- Hollywood Canteen (1944) as Cpl. Slim Green
- Roughly Speaking (1945) as John Crane, ages 20–28
- Too Young to Know (1945) as Ira Enright
- One More Tomorrow (1946) as Surprise Party Guest at Window (uncredited)
- Janie Gets Married (1946) as Dick Lawrence
- Time Out of Mind (1947) as Christopher Fortune
- Love and Learn (1947) as Bob Grant
- Always Together (1947) as Donn Masters
- Wallflower (1948) – Warren James
- Smart Girls Don't Talk (1948) as 'Doc' Vickers
- The Younger Brothers (1949) as Johnny
- And Baby Makes Three (1949) as Herbert T. 'Herbie' Fletcher
- Beauty on Parade (1950) as Gil McRoberts
- The Steel Helmet (1951) as Pvt. Bronte
- New Mexico (1951) as Lieutenant Vermont
- Slaughter Trail (1951) as Lt. Morgan
- The Racket (1951) as Dave Ames
- Gobs and Gals (1952) as Lt. Steven F. Smith
- Tropical Heat Wave (1952) as Stafford E. Carver
- Paris Model (1953) as Charlie Johnson
- Casanova's Big Night (1954) as Raphael, Duc of Castebello
- The Big Bluff (1955) as Dr. Peter Kirk
- Scandal Incorporated (1956) as Brad Cameron
- Yaqui Drums (1956) as Lute Quigg
- The Man Without a Body (1957) as Dr. Phil R. Merritt
- Man from Tangier (1957) as Chuck Collins
- Outcasts of the City (1958)
- Showdown at Boot Hill (1958) as Sloane
- The Colossus of New York (1958) as Dr. John Robert Carrington
- Invisible Invaders (1959) as Dr. John Lamont
- It Started with a Kiss (1959) as Alwin Ashley (uncredited)
- The Jailbreakers (1960) as Tom
- Cinderfella (1960) as Rupert
- Naked Youth (1961) as Maddo
- The Slime People (1963) as Tom Gregory
- The Sicilians (1963) as Calvin Adams
- The Secret Door (1964) as Joe Adams
- Búsqueme a esa chica (1964) as Mr. John Morrison
- Doctor in Clover (1966) as Rock Stewart
- Finders Keepers (1966) as Commander
- The Vulture (1966) as Dr. Eric Lutens
- They Came From Beyond Space (1967) as Dr. Curtis Temple
- You Only Live Twice (1967) as President's Aide (uncredited)
- Torture Garden (1967) as Bruce Benton (segment 2 "Terror Over Hollywood")
- Can Hieronymus Merkin Ever Forget Mercy Humppe and Find True Happiness? (1969) as Insurance Agent (uncredited)
- Cry of the Banshee (1970) as Party Guest
- Trog (1970) as Dr. Richard Warren
- The Persuaders! (1972) as Frank Rocco
- Tales from the Crypt (1972) as Neighbour – Mr. Baker (segment 3 "Poetic Justice")
- The Cherry Picker (1974) as James Burn II
- QB VII (1974) as Ambassador Richards
- The New Roof (1975) as Alexander Hamilton
