= Desert of Lost Men =

1951 film by Harry Keller

- Theatrical release poster
- Directed by: Harry Keller
- Written by: M. Coates Webster
- Produced by: Harry Keller
- Starring: Allan Lane; Mary Ellen Kay; Irving Bacon
- Cinematography: John MacBurnie
- Edited by: Harold Minter
- Music by: Stanley Wilson
- Production company: Republic Pictures
- Distributed by: Republic Pictures
- Release date: November 19, 1951
- Running time: 54 minutes
- Country: United States
- Language: English

Desert of Lost Men is a 1951 American Western film directed by Harry Keller and starring Allan Lane, Mary Ellen Kay and Irving Bacon. The film's art direction was by Frank Arrigo.

== Cast ==
- Allan Lane as Rocky Lane
- Black Jack as Rocky's Horse
- Irving Bacon as Sheriff Skeeter Davis
- Mary Ellen Kay as Nan Webster
- Roy Barcroft as Henchman Link
- Ross Elliott as Dr. Jim Haynes
- Cliff Clark as Carl Landers
- Boyd 'Red' Morgan as Henchman Frank
- Leo Cleary as Dr. Stephens
- Kenneth MacDonald as Bill Hackett
- Steve Pendleton as Posse member
- Roy Bucko as Posse Rider
- Ken Cooper as Henchman Joe
- Frank Ellis as Posse Member
- Herman Hack as Townsman
- Lew Morphy as Henchman

== Bibliography ==
- Pitts, Michael R. Western Movies: A Guide to 5,105 Feature Films.McFarland, 2012.
