= Hattie McDaniel =

American actress (1893–1952)

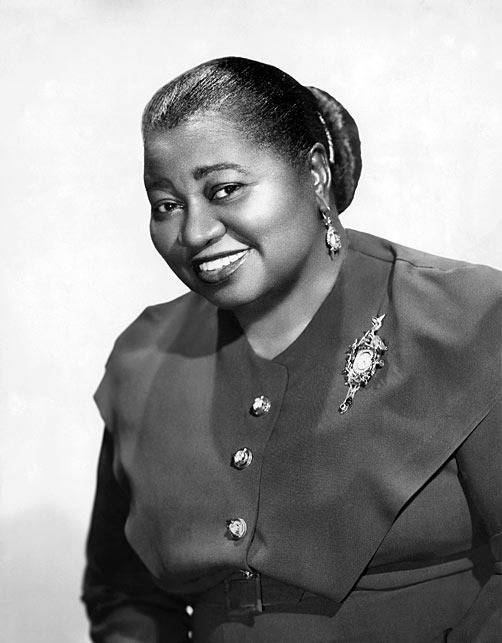
- McDaniel in 1939
- Born: June 10, 1893; Wichita, Kansas, U.S.
- Died: October 26, 1952 (aged 59); Los Angeles, California, U.S.
- Resting place: Angelus-Rosedale Cemetery, Los Angeles
- Occupations: Actress, singer-songwriter, comedian
- Years active: 1920–1952
- Spouses: Howard Hickman (m. 1911; died 1915); George Langford (m. 1922; died 1925); James Lloyd Crawford (m. 1941; div. 1945); Larry Williams (m. 1949; div. 1950)
- Relatives: Etta McDaniel (sister); Sam McDaniel (brother)

Hattie McDaniel (June 10, 1893 – October 26, 1952) was an American actress, singer-songwriter, and comedian. For her role as Mammy in Gone with the Wind (1939), she won the Academy Award for Best Supporting Actress, becoming the first African American to win an Oscar. She has two stars on the Hollywood Walk of Fame, was inducted into the Black Filmmakers Hall of Fame in 1975, and in 2006, became the first black Oscar winner honored with a U.S. postage stamp. In 2010, she was inducted into the Colorado Women's Hall of Fame.

In addition to acting, McDaniel recorded 16 blues sides between 1926 and 1929 and was a radio performer and television personality; she was the first black woman to sing on radio in the United States. Although she appeared in more than 300 films, she received on-screen credits for only 83. Her best known other major films are Alice Adams, In This Our Life, Since You Went Away, and Song of the South.

McDaniel experienced racism and racial segregation throughout her career. She was unable to attend the premiere of Gone with the Wind in Atlanta, despite protests from producer David O. Selznick and fellow cast-member Clark Gable, because it was held in a whites-only theater. At the Oscars ceremony in Los Angeles, she sat at a segregated table at the side of the room. In 1952, McDaniel died of breast cancer. Her final wish, to be buried in Hollywood Cemetery, was denied because at the time of her death, the graveyard was segregated.

== Early life and education ==
McDaniel, the youngest of 13 children, was born in 1893 to formerly enslaved parents in Wichita, Kansas. Her mother, Susan Holbert, was a singer of gospel music, and her father, Henry McDaniel, fought in the Civil War with the 12th United States Colored Troops.

In 1901, the family moved to Fort Collins, Colorado where McDaniel lived with her parents and three siblings in a house at 317 Cherry Street. She attended Franklin School. McDaniel's father Henry preached and sang at church. Local historians successfully appealed to have a plaque installed on the front of the house to recognize it as a historically significant location. The family did not live a long time in the city. They moved to Denver, Colorado. Hattie attended Denver East High School from 1908 to 1910. In 1910, she won a gold medal for reciting "Convict Joe", a Pre-Prohibition-era poem about the evils of alcohol, for a Women's Christian Temperance Union contest.

Her brother, Sam McDaniel, played the butler in the 1948 Three Stooges' short film Heavenly Daze. Her sister Etta McDaniel was also an actress.

== Career ==
=== Early career ===
McDaniel was a songwriter and performer and honed her skills while working with her brother Otis McDaniel's carnival company, a minstrel show. In 1914, while working for her brother's carnival company, McDaniel and her sister Etta Goff launched the McDaniel Sisters Company, an all-female minstrel show. After the death of her brother Otis in November 1916, Hattie and Etta continued their show, performing to full capacity crowds as The McDaniel Sisters and Their Merry Minstrel Maids in April and May 1917.

From 1920 to 1925, McDaniel appeared with Professor George Morrison's Melody Hounds, a black touring ensemble. In the mid-1920s, she embarked on a radio career, singing with the Melody Hounds on station KOA in Denver. From 1926 to 1929, she recorded many of her songs for Okeh Records and Paramount Records in Chicago. McDaniel recorded two sides during a session with Hartzell "Tiny" Parham in the summer of 1926 for the Meritt label in Kansas City, Missouri.

After the stock market crashed in 1929, McDaniel could only find work as a washroom attendant at Sam Pick's Club Madrid near Milwaukee. Despite the Club Madrid owner's reluctance to let her perform, she eventually convinced him to allow her to take the stage and soon thereafter became a regular performer.

In 1931, McDaniel moved to Los Angeles, where she joined her brother Sam, and sisters Etta and Orlena. When she could not get film work, she took jobs as a maid and laundress. Sam was working on a KNX radio program, The Optimistic Do-Nut Hour, and was able to get his sister a spot. She performed on radio as "Hi-Hat Hattie", a bossy maid who often "forgets her place". Her show became popular, but her salary was so low that she had to keep working as a maid. She made her first film appearance in The Golden West (1932), in which she played a house servant or mammy. Her second appearance came in the highly successful Mae West film I'm No Angel (1933), in which she had a significant part. In 1934, McDaniel joined the Screen Actors Guild. She began to attract attention and landed larger film roles, which began to win her screen credits. Fox Film Corporation put her under contract to appear in The Little Colonel (1935), with Shirley Temple, Bill "Bojangles" Robinson, and Lionel Barrymore.

Judge Priest (1934), directed by John Ford and starring Will Rogers, was the first film in which she played a major role. She had a leading part in the film and demonstrated her singing talent, including a duet with Rogers. Rogers helped guide McDaniel's performance. In 1935, McDaniel had prominent roles, as a slovenly maid in Alice Adams (RKO Pictures); a comic part as Jean Harlow's maid and traveling companion in China Seas (MGM) (also starring Clark Gable); and as the maid Isabella in Murder by Television, with Béla Lugosi. She appeared in the 1938 film Vivacious Lady, starring James Stewart and Ginger Rogers. McDaniel had a featured role as Queenie in the 1936 film Show Boat (Universal Pictures), starring Allan Jones and Irene Dunne, in which she sang a verse of Can't Help Lovin' Dat Man and she and Robeson sang "I Still Suits Me". After Show Boat, she had major roles in MGM's Saratoga (1937), starring Jean Harlow and Clark Gable; The Shopworn Angel (1938), with Margaret Sullavan; and The Mad Miss Manton (1938), starring Barbara Stanwyck and Henry Fonda. She had a minor role in Nothing Sacred (1937), in which she played the "jilted wife".

McDaniel was a friend of many of Hollywood's most popular stars, including Joan Crawford, Bette Davis, Shirley Temple, Henry Fonda, Ronald Reagan, Olivia de Havilland, Clark Gable and Will Rogers. She was criticized by members of the black community for the roles she accepted and for pursuing roles aggressively in the Hollywood system, instead of rocking the Hollywood boat by raising black awareness. For example, The Little Colonel (1935) reflected romanticized stereotypes of slave and slaveowners roles in the Old South. Her portrayal of Malena in RKO Pictures' Alice Adams was unique in how Malena interacted with the Adams family. McDaniel's performance was described by reviewers as hilarious and highly comedic. Author Alvin Marill said of McDaniel's performance, "The highlight of the film—indeed one of the best-remembered moments in films of that era—is the dinner party, 'stolen' by Hattie McDaniel as the slatternly maid, Malena. She grumbles over the menu, battles balky dining room doors, fights a flopping maid's cap, chews gum, and shuffles her way through a series of unappetizing courses."

=== Gone with the Wind ===
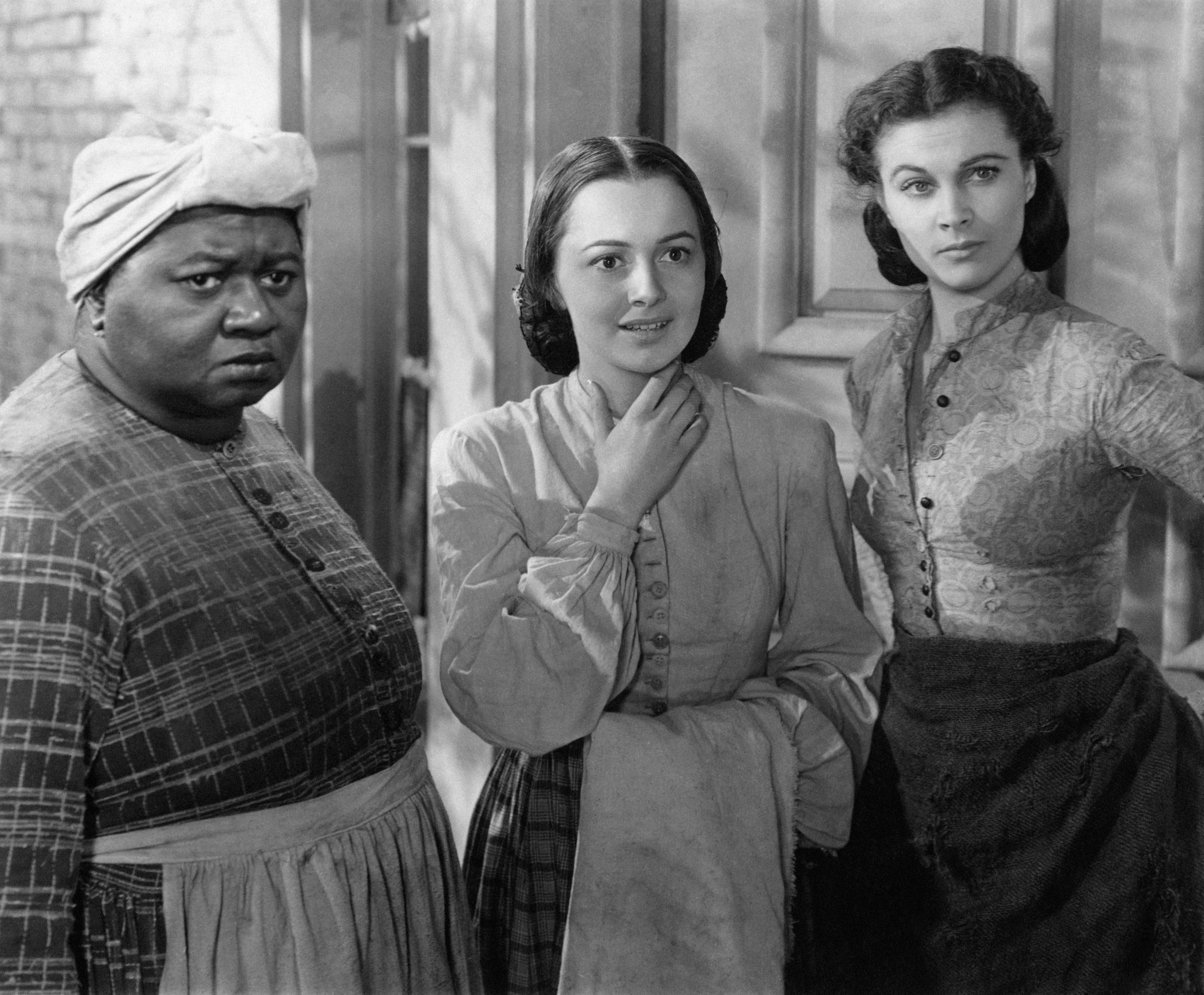
A 1939 publicity photo for Gone with the Wind including McDaniel, Olivia de Havilland, and Vivien Leigh

The competition to win the part of Mammy in Gone with the Wind was almost as fierce as that for Scarlett O'Hara. First Lady Eleanor Roosevelt wrote to film producer David O. Selznick to ask that her own maid, Elizabeth McDuffie, be given the part. McDaniel did not think she would be chosen, because she had earned her reputation as a comic actress. One source claimed that Clark Gable recommended that the role be given to McDaniel; in any case, she went to her audition dressed in an authentic maid's uniform and won the part.

McDaniel said that the role was "an opportunity to glorify Negro womanhood; not the modern, streamlined type of Negro woman who attends teas and concerts in ermine and mink, but the type of Negro of the period which gave us Harriett Tubman, Sojourner Truth, and Charity Still; the brave, efficient, hard-working type of womanhood has built a race, mothered our Booker T. Washington, George W. Carver, Robert Moton, and Mary McLeod Bethune."

Loew's Grand Theater on Peachtree Street in Atlanta was selected by the studio as the site for the Friday, December 15, 1939, premiere of Gone with the Wind. Studio head David O. Selznick asked that McDaniel be permitted to attend despite Georgia's segregation laws, but MGM advised him against it. Clark Gable threatened to boycott the Atlanta premiere unless she was allowed to attend; she convinced him to go. Gone with the Wind (1936) author Margaret Mitchell telegrammed her after the screening: “The Mayor of Atlanta called for a hand for our Hattie McDaniel and I wish you could have heard the cheers.” The two developed a friendship thereafter, though they never met.

McDaniel attended the film's Hollywood debut on December 28, 1939. Upon Selznick's insistence, her picture was featured prominently in the printed program.

==== Reception and 1939 Academy Awards ====
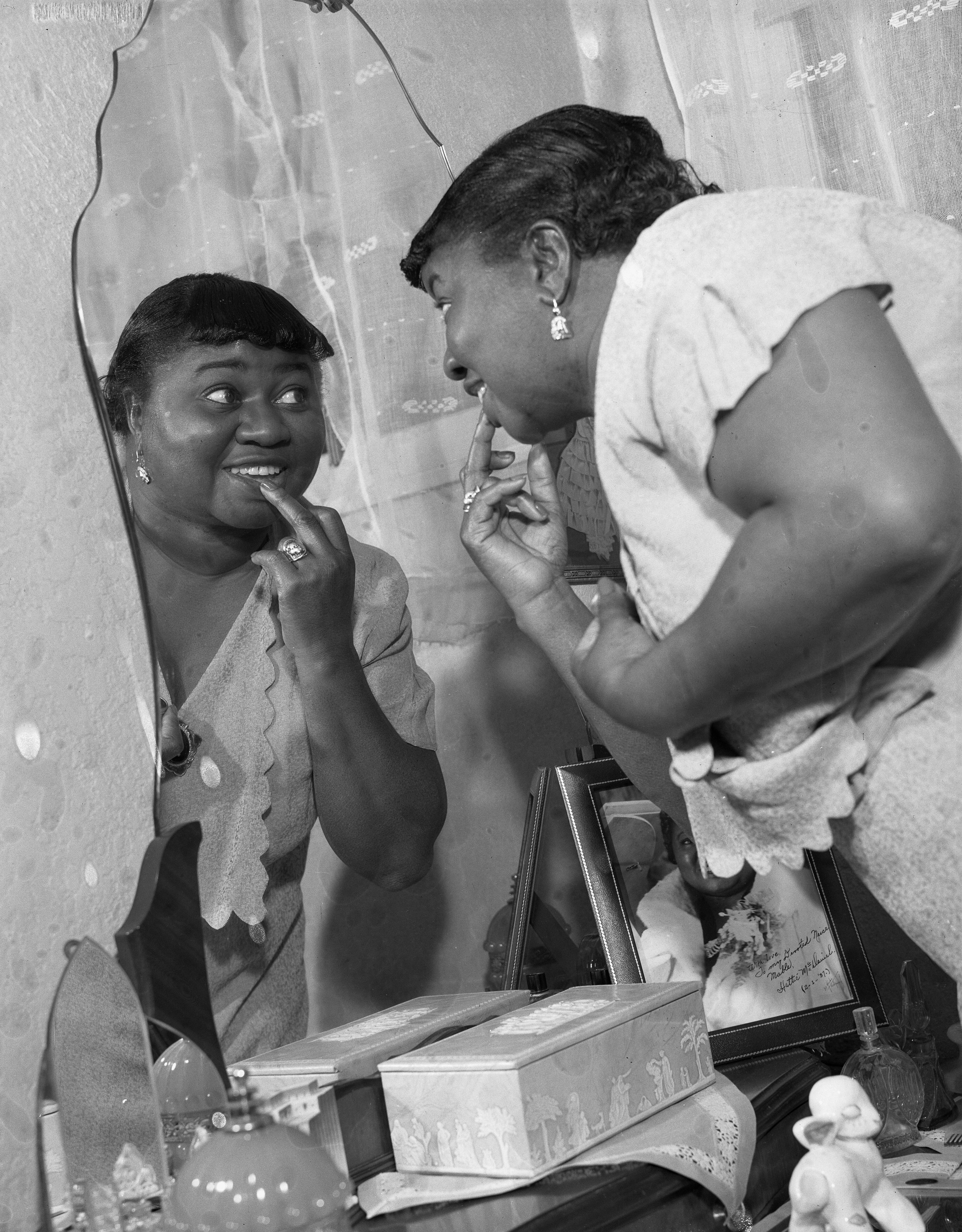
McDaniel in February 1940

For her performance as the enslaved house servant who repeatedly scolds her owner's daughter, Scarlett O'Hara (Vivien Leigh), and scoffs at Rhett Butler (Clark Gable), McDaniel won the 1939 Academy Award for Best Supporting Actress, the first black actor to have been nominated for and to win an Oscar. "I loved Mammy", McDaniel said when speaking to the white press about the character. "I think I understood her because my own grandmother worked on a plantation not unlike Tara". She similarly wrote to Mitchell, praising the author's "authenticity" in her portrayal of the Old South, echoing stories McDaniel had heard from her own grandmother. Her role in Gone with the Wind had alarmed some whites in the South; there were complaints that in the film she had been too "familiar" with her white owners.

At least one writer pointed out that McDaniel's character did not significantly depart from Mammy's persona in Margaret Mitchell's novel, and that in both the film and the book, the much younger Scarlett speaks to Mammy in ways that would be deemed inappropriate for a Southern teenager of that era to speak to a much older white person, and that neither the book nor the film hints of the existence of Mammy's own children (dead or alive), her own family (dead or alive), a real name, or her desires to have anything other than a life at Tara, serving on a slave plantation. Moreover, while Mammy scolds the younger Scarlett, she never crosses Mrs. O'Hara, the more senior white woman in the household. Some critics felt that McDaniel not only accepted the roles but also in her statements to the press acquiesced to Hollywood's stereotypes, providing fuel for critics of those who were fighting for black civil rights. Later, when McDaniel tried to take her "Mammy" character on a road show, black audiences did not prove receptive.

While many black people were happy over McDaniel's personal victory, they also viewed it as bittersweet. They believed Gone With the Wind celebrated the slave system and condemned the forces that destroyed it. For them, the unique accolade McDaniel had won suggested that only those who did not protest Hollywood's systemic use of racial stereotypes could find work and success there. McDaniel had, in fact, convinced Selznick to eliminate several slurs from the script, on the basis that she refused either to say them or have them said to her.

A review in The Times stated that McDaniel "almost acts everybody else off the screen when she is allowed to appear in the foreground."

The 12th Academy Awards took place at Coconut Grove Restaurant of the Ambassador Hotel in Los Angeles. It was preceded by a banquet in the same room. Louella Parsons, an American gossip columnist, reported about Oscar night, writing on February 29, 1940: "Hattie McDaniel earned that gold Oscar by her fine performance of 'Mammy' in ''Gone with the Wind''. If you had seen her face when she walked up to the platform and took the gold trophy, you would have had the choke in your voice that all of us had when Hattie, hair trimmed with gardenias, face alight, and dress up to the queen's taste, accepted the honor in one of the finest speeches ever given on the Academy floor."

Academy of Motion Picture Arts and Sciences, fellow members of the motion picture industry and honored guests: This is one of the happiest moments of my life, and I want to thank each one of you who had a part in selecting me for one of their awards, for your kindness. It has made me feel very, very humble; and I shall always hold it as a beacon for anything that I may be able to do in the future. I sincerely hope I shall always be a credit to my race and to the motion picture industry. My heart is too full to tell you just how I feel, and may I say thank you and God bless you.

— From McDaniel's acceptance speech, 12th Annual Academy Awards, February 29, 1940

McDaniel received a plaque-style Oscar, approximately 5.5 in (14 cm) by 6 in (15 cm), the type awarded to all Best Supporting Actors and Actresses at that time. She and her escort were required to sit at a segregated table for two at the far wall of the room; her white agent, William Meiklejohn, sat at the same table. The hotel had a strict no-blacks policy, but allowed McDaniel in as a favor. (Note: Citing photograph of guests at 12th Academy of Motion Picture Arts & Sciences Awards banquet (1939), Margaret Herrick Library, Special Collections) The discrimination continued after the award ceremony as well; her white co-stars went to a "no-blacks" club, where McDaniel was also denied entry. No other black woman won an Oscar again for 50 years until Whoopi Goldberg won Best Supporting Actress for her role in Ghost. Weeks prior to McDaniel winning her Oscar, there was even more controversy. David Selznick, the producer of Gone With the Wind, omitted the faces of all the black actors on the posters advertising the movie in the South. None of the black cast members were allowed to attend the premiere for the film.

Gone with the Wind won eight Academy Awards. It was later named by the American Film Institute (AFI) as number four among the top 100 American films of all time in the 1998 ranking and number six in the 2007 ranking.

=== Post-Academy Award career ===
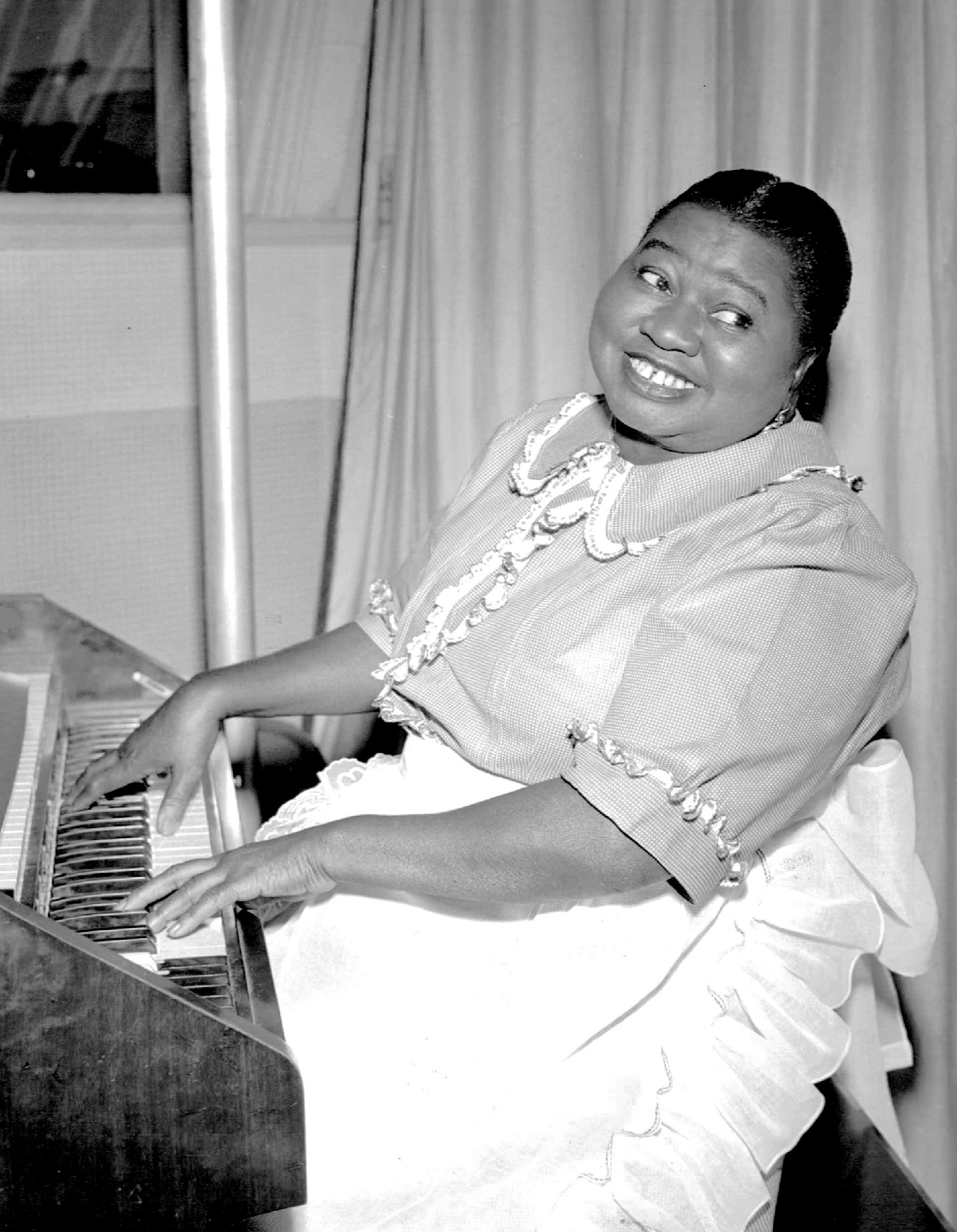
McDaniel as Beulah in August 1951, a year before her death

In the Warner Bros. film In This Our Life (1942), starring Bette Davis and McDaniel's Gone with the Wind co-star Olivia de Havilland and directed by John Huston, McDaniel once again played a domestic, but one who confronts racial issues when her son, a law student, is wrongly accused of manslaughter. It may have been "one of the most significant black female roles of the era". McDaniel was in the same studio's Thank Your Lucky Stars (1943), with Humphrey Bogart and Bette Davis. In its review of the film, Time wrote that McDaniel was comic relief in an otherwise "grim study", writing, "Hattie McDaniel, whose bubbling, blaring good humor more than redeems the roaring bad taste of a Harlem number called Ice Cold Katie". McDaniel continued to play maids during the war years for Warners in The Male Animal (1942) and United Artists' Since You Went Away (1944). She did not use "old-style black Hollywood dialect", and wore a stylish coat and hat, but the film's message was that "black Americans really still preferred to work for white people in menial capacities even if it meant earning a significantly smaller salary and giving up a large amount of independence." She also appeared as a maid in Janie (1944) and played the role of "Aunt Tempe", a maid in Song of the South (1946) for Disney.

She made her last film appearances in Mickey (1948) and Family Honeymoon (1949), where that same year, she appeared on the live CBS television program The Ed Wynn Show. She remained active on radio and television in her final years, becoming the first black actor to star in her own radio show with the comedy series Beulah. She also starred in the television version of the show, replacing Ethel Waters after the first season. (Waters had apparently expressed concerns over stereotypes in the role.) Beulah was a hit, and earned McDaniel $2,000 per week (equal to $24,808 today), however, the show was controversial. In 1951, the United States Army ceased broadcasting Beulah in Asia because troops complained that the show perpetuated negative stereotypes of black men as shiftless and lazy and interfered with the ability of black troops to perform their mission. In the late 1940s, her health declined. McDaniel learned she had breast cancer. Too ill to work, she was replaced by Louise Beavers. (Note: Three of McDaniel's episodes are available on videocassette and on the Internet.)

== Personal life ==
=== Marriages ===
McDaniel married Howard Hickman on January 19, 1911, in Denver, Colorado. He died of pneumonia on March 3, 1915. She married her second husband, George Langford, in 1922. Shortly after they married, he died of a gunshot wound.

McDaniel married her third husband, James Lloyd Crawford, a real estate salesman, on March 21, 1941, in Tucson, Arizona. In his book Bright Boulevards, Bold Dreams, Donald Bogle describes McDaniel as happily confiding to gossip columnist Hedda Hopper in 1945 that she was pregnant. McDaniel began buying baby clothes and set up a nursery in her house. Her plans were shattered when she suffered a false pregnancy and fell into a depression. She never had any children. She divorced Crawford in 1945, after four and a half years of marriage. Crawford had been jealous of her career success, she said.

McDaniel married her fourth husband, Larry Williams, an interior decorator, on June 11, 1949, in Yuma, Arizona, but divorced him in 1950 after testifying that their five months together had been marred by "arguing and fussing". McDaniel broke down in tears when she testified that her husband tried to provoke dissension in the cast of her radio show and otherwise interfered with her work. "I haven't gotten over it yet", she said. "I got so I couldn't sleep. I couldn't concentrate on my lines".

=== Community service ===
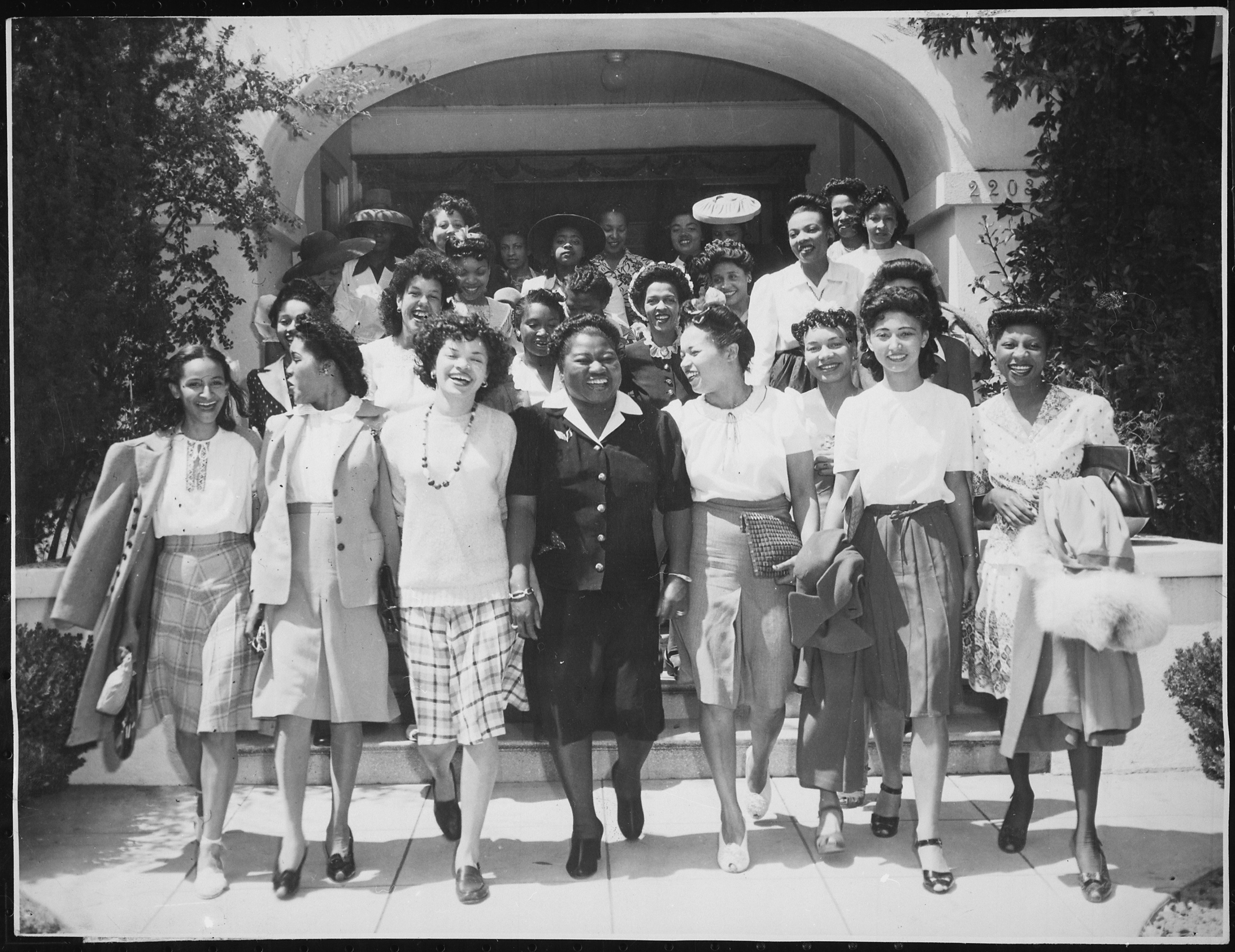
McDaniel leading entertainers from her Los Angeles home to Minter Field for a performance for World War II soldiers in 1942

During World War II, she served as chairman of the Negro Division of the Hollywood Victory Committee, providing entertainment for soldiers stationed at military bases. The U.S. military was segregated, and black entertainers were not yet allowed to serve on white entertainment committees. She elicited the help of a friend, the actor Leigh Whipper, and other black entertainers for her committee. She made numerous personal appearances at military hospitals, threw parties, and performed at United Service Organizations (USO) shows and war bond rallies to raise funds to support the war on behalf of the Victory Committee. McDaniel was also a member of American Women's Voluntary Services.

She joined actor Clarence Muse, one of the first black members of the Screen Actors Guild, in an NBC radio broadcast to raise funds for Red Cross relief programs for Americans that had been displaced by devastating floods, and she gained a reputation for generosity, lending money to friends and strangers alike.

When her Los Angeles neighbors in the Sugar Hill area tried to have black families evicted from their homes by suing to have race restrictive covenants enforced, McDaniel took a lead role. She held meetings at her home, organizing around 30 black residents in order to fight the suit in court.

Hattie McDaniel was an honorary member of Sigma Gamma Rho and its branch in Los Angeles.

== Death ==
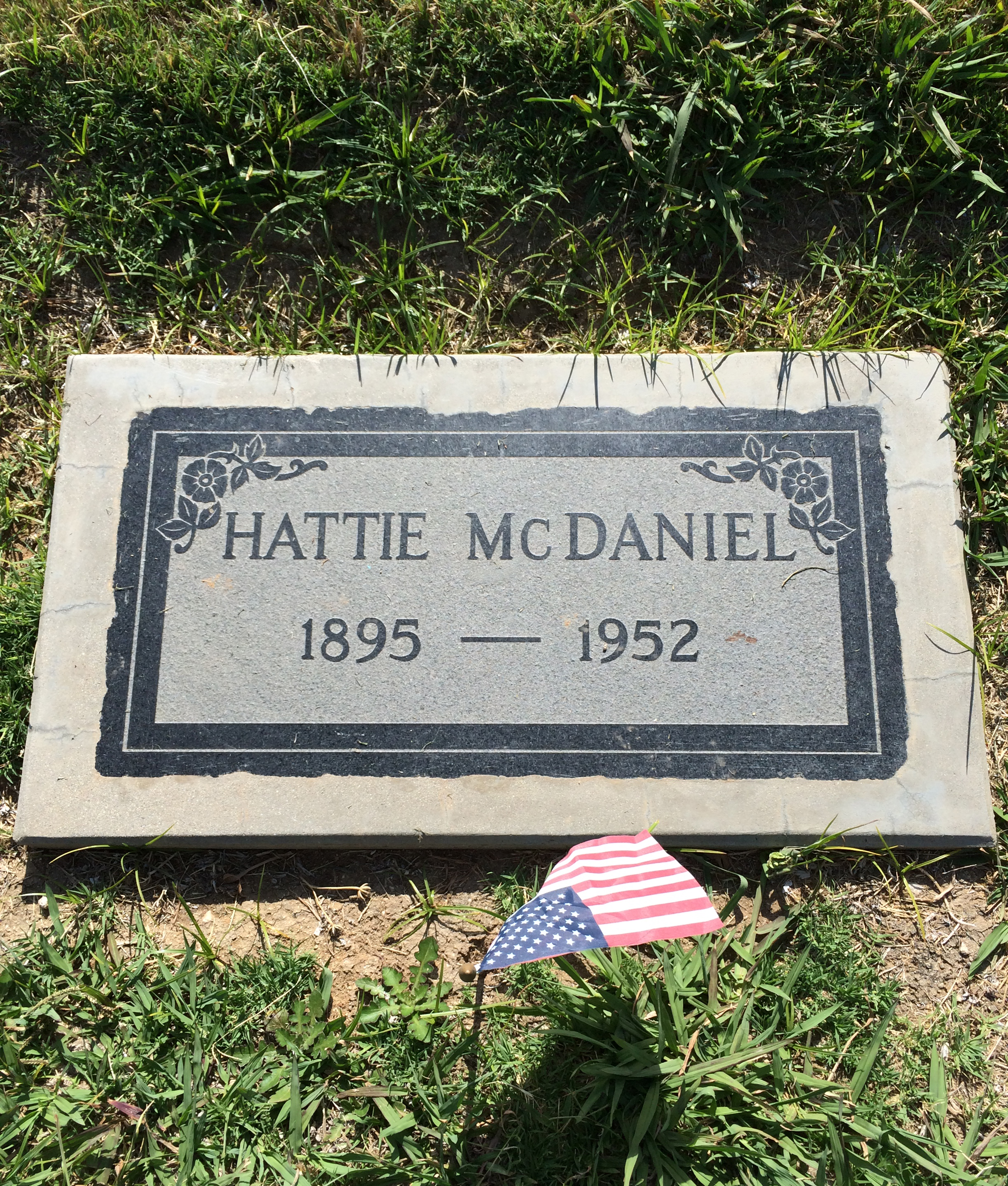
McDaniel's gravesite at Angelus-Rosedale Cemetery in Los Angeles

McDaniel's cenotaph at Hollywood Forever Cemetery

On August 26, 1951, McDaniel suffered a stroke, complicated by diabetes and a heart ailment, and was admitted to the Temple Hospital in Los Angeles.

She died of breast cancer on October 26, 1952, in the hospital of the Motion Picture House in the San Fernando Valley. She was survived by her brother Sam McDaniel. Three thousand mourners turned out to celebrate her life and achievements.

McDaniel wished to be buried in Hollywood Cemetery, which upheld a policy of racial segregation at the time and refused to inter her; she was buried instead in Rosedale Cemetery (the first cemetery in Los Angeles open to all races and creeds).

In 1999, Hollywood Cemetery offered to have McDaniel re-interred there, but after her family declined the offer the cemetery erected a cenotaph, now one of Hollywood's most popular tourist attractions, overlooking its lake.

McDaniel's last will and testament of December 1951 bequeathed her Oscar to Howard University, where she had been honored by the students with a luncheon after she had won her Oscar. At the time of her death, McDaniel would have had few options. Very few white institutions in that day preserved black history. Historically, black colleges had been where such artifacts were placed.

Despite evidence McDaniel earned an excellent income as an actress, her final estate was less than $10,000. The IRS claimed the estate owed more than $11,000 in taxes. In the end, the probate court ordered all of her property, including her Oscar, sold to pay off creditors. Years later, the Oscar turned up where McDaniel wanted it to be: Howard University, where, according to reports, it was displayed in a glass case in the university's drama department. It appears to have gone missing from Howard in the 1960s or 1970s, however, and it was never recovered.

On September 26, 2023, the Academy of Motion Picture Arts and Sciences announced that it would replace McDaniel's Oscar, returning it to Howard University in a ceremony which was held on October 1, 2023.

== Reception and impact ==
=== African American politics ===
As her fame grew, McDaniel faced growing criticism from some members of the black community. Groups such as the NAACP complained that Hollywood stereotypes not only restricted black actors to servant roles but often portrayed them as lazy, dim-witted, satisfied with lowly positions, or violent. In addition to addressing the studios, they called upon actors, and especially leading black actors, to pressure studios to offer more substantive roles and at least not pander to stereotypes. They also argued that these portrayals were unfair as well as inaccurate and that, coupled with segregation and other forms of discrimination, such stereotypes were making it difficult for all black people, not only actors, to overcome racism and succeed in the entertainment industry. Some attacked McDaniel for being an "Uncle Tom", a person willing to advance personally by perpetuating racial stereotypes or being an agreeable agent of offensive racial restrictions. McDaniel characterized these challenges as class-based biases against domestics, a claim that white columnists seemed to accept. She reportedly said, "Why should I complain about making $700 a week playing a maid? If I didn't, I'd be making $7 a week being one".

Unlike many other black entertainers, she was not associated with civil rights protests and was largely absent from efforts to establish a commercial base for independent black films. She did not join the Negro Actors Guild of America until 1947, late in her career. McDaniel hired one of the few white agents who would represent black actors at the time, William Meiklejohn, to advance her career. Her avoidance of political controversy was deliberate. When columnist Hedda Hopper sent her Richard Nixon placards and asked McDaniel to distribute them, McDaniel declined, replying she had long ago decided to stay out of politics. "Beulah is everybody's friend", she said. Since she was earning a living honestly, she added, she should not be criticized for accepting such work as was offered. Her critics, especially Walter White of the NAACP, claimed that she and other actors who agreed to portray stereotypes were not a neutral force but rather willing agents of black oppression.

McDaniel and other black actresses and actors feared that their roles would evaporate if the NAACP and other Hollywood critics complained too loudly. She blamed these critics for hindering her career and sought the help of allies of doubtful reputation. After speaking with McDaniel, Hopper claimed that McDaniel's career troubles were not the result of racism but had been caused by McDaniel's "own people".

=== Achievements and legacy ===
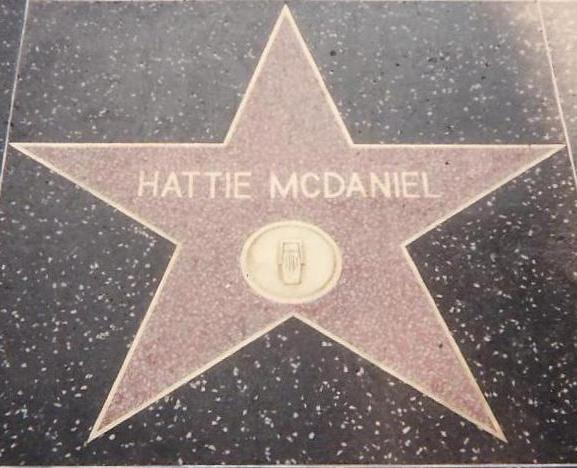
McDaniel's star on the Hollywood Walk of Fame, awarded for her contributions to radio, located at 6933 Hollywood Boulevard; her second star for her film work is at 1719 Vine Street.

McDaniel has two stars on the Hollywood Walk of Fame in Hollywood: one at 6933 Hollywood Boulevard for her contributions to radio and one at 1719 Vine Street for motion pictures. In 1975, she was inducted posthumously into the Black Filmmakers Hall of Fame.

In 1994, actress and singer Karla Burns, the first black performer to win a Laurence Olivier Award, launched her one-woman show Hi-Hat-Hattie (written by Larry Parr), about McDaniel's life. Burns went on to perform the role in several other cities through 2018, including Off-Broadway and the Long Beach Playhouse Studio Theatre in California.

In 2002, McDaniel's legacy was celebrated in American Movie Classics's (AMC) film Beyond Tara, The Extraordinary Life of Hattie McDaniel (2001), produced and directed by Madison D. Lacy and hosted by Whoopi Goldberg. This one-hour special depicted McDaniel's struggles and triumphs in the presence of rampant racism and brutal adversity. The film won the 2001–2002 Daytime Emmy Award, presented on May 17, 2002, for Outstanding Special Class Special.

McDaniel was the 29th inductee in the Black Heritage Series by the United States Postal Service. Her 39-cent stamp was released on January 29, 2006, featuring a 1941 photograph of McDaniel in the dress she wore to accept the Academy Award in 1940. The ceremony took place at the Margaret Herrick Library of the Academy of Motion Picture Arts and Sciences, where the Hattie McDaniel collection includes photographs of McDaniel and other family members as well as scripts and other documents.

In 2004 Rita Dove, the first black U.S. poet laureate, published her poem "Hattie McDaniel Arrives at the Coconut Grove" in The New Yorker and has since presented it frequently during her poetry readings as well as on YouTube.

In 2010, Mo'Nique, the winner of the Oscar for Best Supporting Actress in Precious, wearing a blue dress and gardenias in her hair, as McDaniel had at the ceremony in 1940, in her acceptance speech thanked McDaniel "for enduring all that she had to so that I would not have to".

In the 2020 Netflix mini-series Hollywood, a fictionalized Hattie McDaniel is played by Queen Latifah.

ReShonda Tate Billingsley's historical novel about McDaniel, The Queen of Sugar Hill: A Novel of Hattie McDaniel, was released in March 2024.

On October 26, 2024, the anniversary of McDaniel's death, the first full-length film about her life, The Dichotomy of Hattie McDaniel, produced by Houston Theater and media company Vincent Victoria Presents, premiered in Houston, Texas. The Dichotomy of Hattie Mc Daniel was the opening film at the 2025 San Diego Black Film Festival and won for Best Drama, Best Director for Vincent Victoria, and Best Actress for Wykesha King as Hattie McDaniel. The film also won Best Feature Film at the 2025 Charlotte Black Film Festival.

=== Whereabouts of the McDaniel Oscar ===
The whereabouts of McDaniel's Oscar are currently unknown. In 1992, Jet magazine reported that Howard University could not find it and alleged that it had disappeared during protests in the 1960s. Since the matter has become one of public discussion, in 1998 Howard University faced a barrage of negative press charging that it negligently "lost" the Oscar or, alternatively, allowed it to be stolen.

In 2007, an article in The Huffington Post repeated rumors that the Oscar had been cast into the Potomac River by angry civil rights protesters in the 1960s. The assertion reappeared in The Huffington Post two years later, in 2009.

In November 2011, W. Burlette Carter at George Washington University Law School published the results of her year-and-a-half-long investigation into the Oscar's fate. Howard could find no official records of receipt. Carter rejected claims students had stolen the Oscar and thrown it into the Potomac River as wild speculation and asserted that the story was a racist fabrication targeting black students. Carter also questioned the sourcing of The Huffington Post stories. She argued the Oscar had likely been returned to Howard University's Channing Pollack Theater Collection between the spring of 1971 and the summer of 1973, without any suggestion of where the Oscar had been prior to this date. Alternatively, she claimed, the Oscar was boxed and stored in Howard's drama department to make room for a new generation of black performers, not because of civil unrest and black student backlash against the Oscar's meaning. If neither the Oscar nor any paper trail of its ultimate destiny can be found at Howard today, Carter suggested, the disappearance was due to inadequate storage or record-keeping in a time of financial constraints and national turbulence, not racist claims of the Oscar having been thrown in the Potomac. Carter believes the Oscar is still in storage at Howard and suggests a new generation of caretakers have failed to realize the historic significance of the award.

=== Homeowners' covenant case victory ===
McDaniel was the most famous of the black homeowners who helped to organize the black West Adams neighborhood residents who saved their homes. Loren Miller, an attorney and the owner and publisher of the California Eagle newspaper, represented the minority homeowners in their restrictive covenant case.

In 1938, McDaniel – along with other black stars of the time including Ethel Waters and Louise Beavers – moved into a colonial mansion on 24th street in the West Adams Heights neighborhood in West Adams. When the West Adams Heights tract was laid out in 1902, many of its early residents were required to sign a restrictive covenant. Amongst requirements such as building a "first-class residence", of at least two stories, costing no less than two-thousand dollars (at a time when a respectable home could be built for a quarter of that amount, including the land), and built no less than thirty-five feet from the property's primary boundary", residents were also prohibited from selling or leasing their property to people of color. By the mid-1930s, most of the restrictions had expired, making space for non-Caucasian residents to move into the neighborhood. "The Heights" became particularly popular amongst prominent black figures between 1938 and 1945. West Adam Heights became known as "Sugar Hill".

On December 6, 1945, some of the white West Adam Heights residents filed a lawsuit against 31 black residents – including McDaniel. McDaniel held workshops to strategize for the case and gathered around 250 sympathizers to accompany her to court. Judge Thurmond Clarke left the courtroom to see the disputed neighborhood and threw out the case the following day. He said, "It is time that members of the Negro race are accorded, without reservations or evasions, the full rights guaranteed them under the 14th Amendment to the Federal Constitution. Judges have been avoiding the real issue too long." McDaniel's case would go on to set a precedent that later impacted the 1948 Shelley v. Kramer Supreme Court ruling which in summary states that "holding that state courts may not enforce racially restrictive covenants".

On December 17, 1945, Time magazine reported:

Spacious, well-kept West Adams Heights still had the complacent look of the days when most of Los Angeles' aristocracy lived there. ...

In 1938, Negroes, willing and able to pay $15,000 and up for Heights property, had begun moving into the old eclectic mansions. Many were movie folk – Actresses Louise Beavers, Hattie McDaniel, Ethel Waters, etc. They improved their holdings, kept their well-defined ways, quickly won more than tolerance from most of their white neighbors.

But some whites, refusing to be comforted, had referred to the original racial restriction covenant that came with the development of West Adams Heights back in 1902 which restricted "Non-caucasians" from owning property. For seven years they had tried to enforce it, but failed. Then they went to court. ...

Superior Judge Thurmond Clarke decided to visit the disputed ground – popularly known as "Sugar Hill." ... Next morning, ... Judge Clarke threw the case out of court. His reason: "It is time that members of the Negro race are accorded, without reservations or evasions, the full rights guaranteed them under the 14th Amendment to the Federal Constitution. Judges have been avoiding the real issue too long".

Said Hattie McDaniel, of West Adams Heights: "Words cannot express my appreciation".

McDaniel had purchased her white, two-story, seventeen-room house in 1942. The house included a large living room, dining room, drawing room, den, butler's pantry, kitchen, service porch, library, four bedrooms and a basement. McDaniel had a yearly Hollywood party. Everyone knew that the king of Hollywood, Clark Gable, could always be found at McDaniel's parties.

== Filmography ==
=== Film ===
Features

Year	Title	Role	Notes
1932	Love Bound		
1932	Impatient Maiden	Injured Patient	uncredited
1932	Are You Listening?	Aunt Fatima – Singer	uncredited
1932	The Washington Masquerade	Maid	uncredited
1932	The Boiling Point	Caroline the Cook	uncredited
1932	Crooner	Maid in Ladies' Room	uncredited
1932	Blonde Venus	Cora, Helen's Maid in New Orleans	uncredited
1932	The Golden West	Mammy Lou	uncredited
1932	Hypnotized	Powder Room Attendant	uncredited
1933	Hello, Sister	Woman in Apartment House	uncredited
1933	I'm No Angel	Tira's Maid-Manicurist	uncredited
1933	Goodbye Love	Edna the Maid	uncredited
1934	Merry Wives of Reno	Bunny's Maid	uncredited
1934	City Park	Tessie – the Ransome Maid	uncredited
1934	Operator 13	Annie	uncredited
1934	King Kelly of the U.S.A.	Black Narcissus Mop Buyer	uncredited
1934	Judge Priest	Aunt Dilsey	
1934	Imitation of Life	Woman at Funeral	uncredited
1934	Flirtation	Minor Role	uncredited
1934	Lost in the Stratosphere	Ida Johnson	
1934	Babbitt	Rosalie, the Maid	uncredited
1934	Little Men	Asia	uncredited
1935	The Little Colonel	Mom Beck	
1935	Transient Lady	Servant	uncredited
1935	Traveling Saleslady	Martha Smith	uncredited
1935	China Seas	Isabel McCarthy, Dolly's Maid	uncredited
1935	Alice Adams	Malena Burns	
1935	Harmony Lane	Liza, the Cook	uncredited
1935	Murder by Television	Isabella – the Cook	
1935	Music Is Magic	Hattie	
1935	Another Face	Nellie – Sheila's Maid	uncredited
1935	We're Only Human	Molly, Martin's Maid	uncredited
1936	Next Time We Love	Hanna	uncredited
1936	The First Baby	Dora	
1936	The Singing Kid	Maid	uncredited
1936	Gentle Julia	Kitty Silvers	
1936	Show Boat	Queenie	
1936	High Tension	Hattie	
1936	The Bride Walks Out	Mamie – Carolyn's Maid	
1936	Postal Inspector	Deborah	uncredited
1936	Star for a Night	Hattie	
1936	Valiant Is the Word for Carrie	Ellen Belle	
1936	Libeled Lady	Maid in Grand Plaza Hall	uncredited
1936	Can This Be Dixie?	Lizzie	
1936	Reunion	Sadie	
1937	Racing Lady	Abby	
1937	Don't Tell the Wife	Mamie, Nancy's Maid	uncredited
1937	The Crime Nobody Saw	Ambrosia	
1937	The Wildcatter	Pearl	uncredited
1937	Saratoga	Rosetta	
1937	Stella Dallas	Maid	
1937	Sky Racket	Jenny	
1937	Over the Goal	Hannah	
1937	Merry Go Round of 1938	Maid	uncredited
1937	Nothing Sacred	Mrs. Walker	uncredited
1937	45 Fathers	Beulah	
1937	Quick Money	Hattie	uncredited
1937	True Confession	Ella	
1938	Battle of Broadway	Agatha	
1938	Vivacious Lady	Hattie – Maid at Prom Dance	uncredited
1938	The Shopworn Angel	Martha	
1938	Carefree	Hattie	uncredited
1938	The Mad Miss Manton	Hilda	
1938	The Shining Hour	Belvedere	
1939	Everybody's Baby	Hattie	
1939	Zenobia	Dehlia	
1939	Gone with the Wind	Mammy – House Servant	Academy Award for Best Supporting Actress
1940	Maryland	Aunt Carrie	
1941	The Great Lie	Violet	
1941	Affectionately Yours	Cynthia	
1941	They Died with Their Boots On	Callie	
1942	The Male Animal	Cleota	
1942	In This Our Life	Minerva Clay	
1942	George Washington Slept Here	Hester, the Fullers' Maid	
1943	Johnny Come Lately	Aida	
1943	Thank Your Lucky Stars	Gossip in 'Ice Cold Katie' Number	
1944	Since You Went Away	Fidelia	
1944	Janie	April – Conway's Maid	
1944	Three Is a Family	Maid	
1944	Hi, Beautiful	Millie	
1946	Janie Gets Married	April	
1946	Margie	Cynthia	
1946	Never Say Goodbye	Cozie	
1946	Song of the South	Aunt Tempy	
1947	The Flame	Celia	
1948	Mickey	Bertha	
1948	Family Honeymoon	Phyllis	
1949	The Big Wheel	Minnie	

Short films

Year	Title	Role	Notes
1934	Mickey McGuire	Maid	Mickey's Rescue
1934	Fate's Fathead	Mandy – the Maid	uncredited
1934	The Chases of Pimple Street	Hattie, Gertrude's Maid	
1935	Okay Toots!	Hattie – the Maid	uncredited
1935	Wig-Wag	Cook	uncredited
1935	The Four Star Boarder	Maid	uncredited
1935-1936	Our Gang	Mandy, the Maid	Anniversary Trouble
1935-1936	Our Gang	Buckwheat's Mother	Arbor Day
1937	Mississippi Moods	Hattie	

=== Television ===
Year	Title	Role	Notes
1952	Beulah	Beulah	6 episodes

=== Radio ===
Year	Program	Episode/source
1926	Melony Hounds	Station KOA, Denver,
1931	The Optimistic Do-Nut Hour	Station KNX, Los Angeles
1941	Gulf Screen Guild Theatre	No Time for Comedy
1944	Amos 'n' Andy	
1947	The Beulah Show	

- McDaniel was a semi-regular on the radio program Amos 'n' Andy, first as Andy's demanding landlady. In one episode they nearly marry. Andy was out for her money, aided and abetted by the Kingfish, who gives his wife's diamond ring to present to McDaniel as an engagement ring. The scheme blows up in their faces when Sapphire decides to throw a party to celebrate. Andy desperately tries to conceal the ring from Sapphire. In frustration and growing anger, McDaniel says to Andy, "Andy, sweetheart, darlin'. Is you gonna let go of my hand or does I have to pop you??!!" This episode aired on NBC in June 1944. She played a similar character, Sadie Simpson, in several later episodes.

== Discography ==
Hattie McDaniel recorded infrequently as a singer. In addition to the musical numbers over her long career in films, she recorded for Okeh Records, Paramount, and the small Kansas City, Missouri label Merrit. All of her known recordings (some of which were never issued) were recorded in the 1920s.

Label	Title	Recorded	Format	Catalogue no.
Merrit Records	"Brown-Skinned Baby Doll" / "Quittin' My Man"	06/26	Unissued	Merrit 2202
Okeh Records	"I Wish I Had Somebody" /" Boo Hoo Blues"	11/10/26	78 rpm	Okeh 9899/9900
	"Wonderful Dream/ "Lonely Heart"	11/17/26	Unissued	Okeh W80845/W80846
	"Sam Henry Blues" / "Poor Boy Blues"	05/10/27	Unissued	Okeh W80852/W80853
	"I Thought I'd Do It" / "Just One Sorrowing Heart"	12/14/27	78 rpm	Okeh W82061/W82062
	"Sam Henry Blues" / "Destroyin Blues"	12/14/27	Unissued	Okeh W82063/W82064
Paramount Records	"Dentist Chair Blues Part 1" / "Dentist Chair Blues Part 2" (with Papa Charlie Jackson)	03/??/29	78 rpm	Paramount 12751 A/12751 B
	"That New Love Maker Of Mine" / "Any Kind Of Man Would Be Better Than You"	03/??/29	78 rpm	Paramount 17290

== See also ==
- List of African-American firsts
- List of black Academy Award winners and nominees
- List of stars on the Hollywood Walk of Fame

== Bibliography ==
- Carter, W. Burlette (2011). "Finding the Oscar". Howard Law Journal. 55 (1): 107. SSRN 1980721 – via scholarship.law.gwu.edu.
- Jackson, Carlton (1993). Hattie: The Life of Hattie McDaniel. Madison Books. ISBN 978-1-4617-3337-9 – via Google Books.
- Lyman, Darryl (2005). Great African American Women. Jonathan David. ISBN 0-8246-0459-8.
- Harris, Warren G. (2002). Clark Gable: A Biography. Harmon. ISBN 0-307-23714-1.
- Watts, Jill (2005). Hattie McDaniel: Black Ambition, White Hollywood. HarperCollins. ISBN 0-06-051490-6.
- Young, Al (October 15, 1989). "I'd Rather Play a Maid Than Be One". The New York Times.
- Zeigler, Ronny. "Hattie McDaniel: '(I'd) ... rather play a maid.'" N.Y. Amsterdam News, April 28, 1979.
