= William Meiklejohn =

- Born: William Meiklejohn; March 16, 1903; Los Angeles, California
- Died: April 26, 1981 (aged 78); Burbank, California
- Occupation(s): Hollywood Talent Agent and Talent Scout

William Meiklejohn (/ˈmiːkəlˌdʒɒn/; March 16, 1903 – April 26, 1981), was a Hollywood talent agent and scout in the 1920s through the 1940s. He had his own talent agency called the William Meiklejohn Agency that he sold to MCA in May 1939. At the time of the sale, his agency had over 100 actors and writers like Hattie McDaniel and Dorothy Parker. He was known for his self-avowed “seventh sense” to discover and promote stars such as Mickey Rooney, Judy Garland, Lucille Ball, and in 1937 Ronald Reagan who was then a sportscaster in Des Moines, Iowa.

Meiklejohn began his career in 1921 in his native Los Angeles as a booking agent for 80 different vaudeville acts. In 1939 he sold his agency to the Music Corporation of America (MCA) when the corporation opened in Hollywood and joined them as vice-president in charge of setting up their motion picture division. In 1940, he was loaned to Paramount for two weeks, but stayed for 20 years as head of talent and casting. In 1960, he left the studio and once again became an independent agent for the likes of Nat King Cole, Pat O'Brien, and his close friend Ronald Reagan.

Meiklejohn died, aged 78, on April 26, 1981, in Burbank, California, from undisclosed causes.

== Hollywood Walk of Fame ==
For contributions to the motion picture industry he was honored with a star on the Hollywood Walk of Fame at 1777 Vine Street. the star is inscribed simply "Meiklejohn" as it was dedicated to not only William but also his siblings, sister Jean and brother Campbell. Jean ran the Meiklejohn and Dunn Theatrical agency which was located in the Majestic Theatre building in Hollywood, along with another brother Matthew. Campbell was manager of Grauman's Egyptian Theatre in Hollywood which held the first Hollywood premiere Robin Hood in 1922 the last one to be held at the Egyptian was Funny Girl in 1968.
