= Leslie Banning =

American actress (1930–2014)

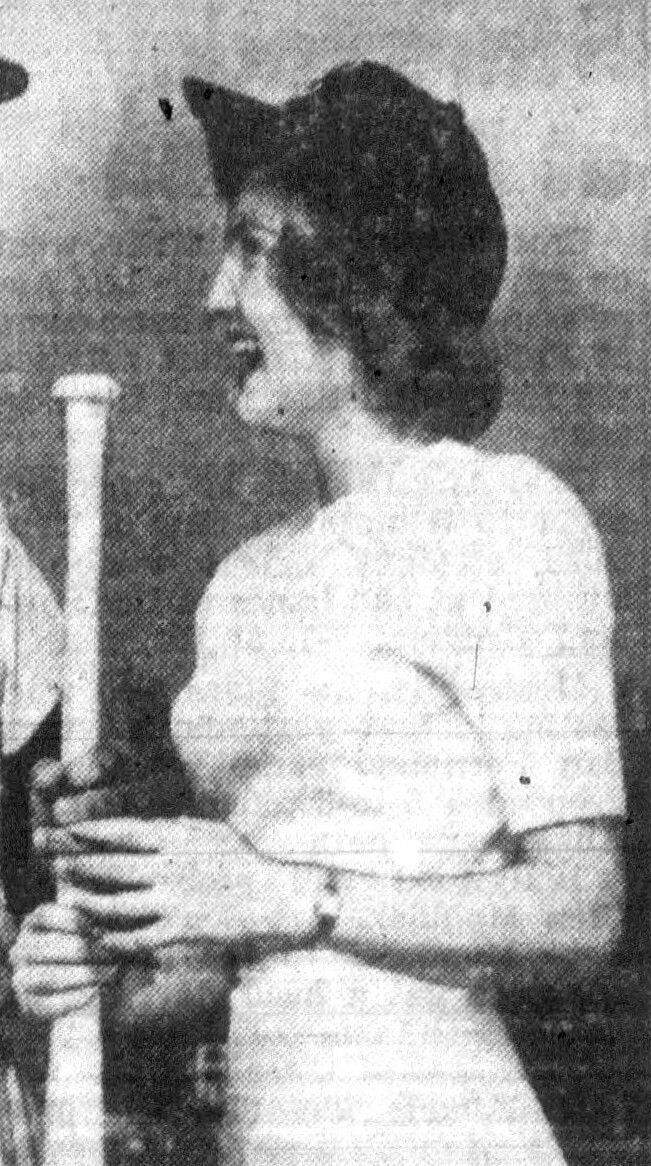
- Banning, circa 1950
- Born: Mary Louise Welch; November 15, 1930; Los Angeles, California, U.S.
- Died: July 22, 2014 (aged 83); Simi Valley, California, U.S.
- Occupation: Actress
- Years active: 1949–1956 (film)

Leslie Banning (born Mary Louise Welch; November 15, 1930 – July 22, 2014) was an American film actress. She was sometimes credited as Leslye Banning.

Banning attended Glendale High School.

Banning signed a contract with Universal International in 1949. She played the female lead in the Western film Cactus Caravan (1951).

On May 1, 1949, Banning married Wallace Russell, brother of actress Jane Russell. In 1974, her married name was Mary Lou Rogers; she was married to a teacher in Simi Valley, California.

Banning died in Simi Valley, California on July 22, 2014, at the age of 83.

== Selected filmography ==
- Renegades of the Sage (1949)
- Dangerous Inheritance (1950)
- A Woman of Distinction (1950)
- Girls' School (1950)
- Hurricane at Pilgrim Hill (1950)
- His Kind of Woman (1951)
- Black Hills Ambush (1952)
- Stagecoach to Fury (1956)

== Bibliography ==
- Bernard A. Drew. Motion Picture Series and Sequels: A Reference Guide. Routledge, 2013.
