= Lillian Bronson =

American actress (1902–1995)

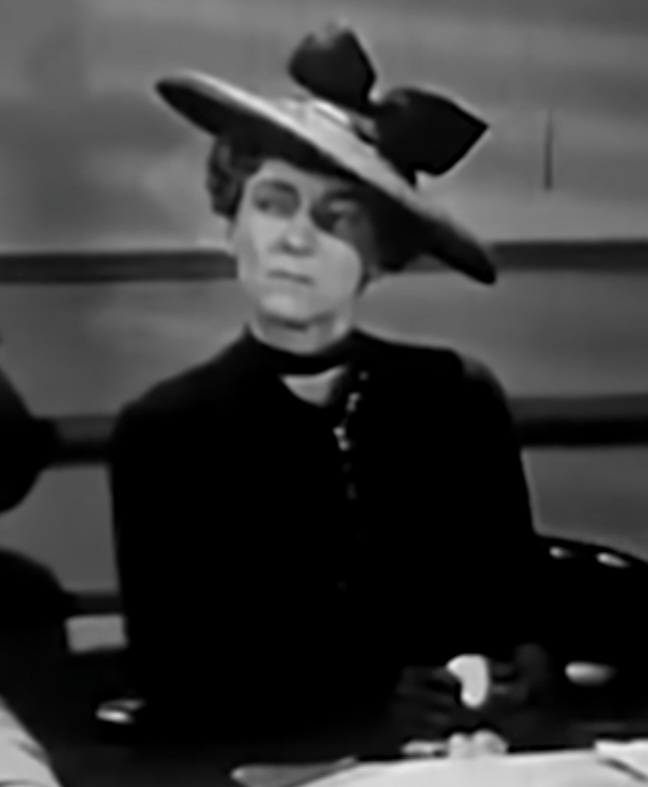
- Bronson in Hollywood and Vine (1945)
- Born: Lillian Rumsey Bronson; October 21, 1902; Lockport, New York, U.S.
- Died: August 2, 1995 (aged 92); San Clemente, California, U.S.
- Education: University of Michigan
- Occupation: Actress
- Years active: 1930–1975
- Spouse: Henry Daniels Mygatt (m. 1936–1943)

Lillian Rumsey Bronson (October 21, 1902 – August 2, 1995) was an American character actress. She performed in more than 80 films and 100 television productions.

== Early years ==
Born in Lockport, New York, on October 21, 1902, Bronson was the daughter of Mr. and Mrs. E. K. Bronson, and she had a sister. After attending Lockport High School, she graduated from Miss Wright's School at Bryn Mawr. Her early training in drama occurred at the University of Michigan, from which she graduated in 1926. She next studied at the American Laboratory Theatre in New York.

== Career ==
By 1928 Bronson was acting with the Rockford Players. In 1930 she made her debut on Broadway as the Exchange Operator in Louis Weitzenkorn's Five Star Final. Her other Broadway credits included Lean Harvest (1931), Camille (1932), and The Druid Circle (1947).

In 1943, Bronson appeared in the movie Happy Land as Mattie Dyer. Her television debut was the episode "The Druid Circle" of The Philco Television Playhouse, that aired on March 6, 1949, in the role of Miss Dagnall.

She appeared in four episodes of Perry Mason. She appeared as Clara Mayfield in the 1957 episode "The Case of the Sulky Girl" and as the judge in the 1958 episode "The Case of the Corresponding Corpse", the 1959 episode "The Case of the Shattered Dream", and the 1960 episode "The Case of the Clumsy Clown". In March of 1959, Bronson appeared in the Leave It To Beaver episode "The Haunted House", as Miss Cooper. Also, in 1959, she was featured as Mrs Butler on The Donna Reed Show. She appeared as Erma Bishop in a 1960 episode of The Andy Griffith Show, "The Beauty Contest".

Bronson's final movie appearance was in the film Kisses for My President (1964), in which she played the part of Miss Currier.

She then appeared in a long series of minor characters for many television series until the mid-1970s, including many western genres. She became widely known for her role as the grandmother in the Kings Row television series.

Bronson's final appearance on television was as "Grandma Nussbaum", Fonzie's grandmother, in the episode "Fonzie Moves In" of Happy Days, which aired on September 9, 1975.

In her later years Bronson turned down film roles that she saw as demeaning — especially those that portrayed older people in negative ways. She spoke positively about older people to student groups in colleges and schools and worked in a public library as a volunteer.

== Death and legacy ==
Bronson spent her last few years in Laguna Beach. She died in a San Clemente, California, hospital on August 2, 1995.

=== "Old Woman of the Freeway" mural ===
In 1974, muralist Kent Twitchell chose a photo of Bronson to use as the model for a huge mural, titled "The Old Woman of the Freeway", to paint on a wall of a Downtown Los Angeles building which looked down from the Angeles Prince Hotel in Echo Park onto the Hollywood Freeway. The original mural had been neglected by L.A. city officials, as a garage obscured the lower half and a billboard company had whitewashed the image in 1986. A partial restoration began in 1992. In 1994, a plan to rehang the mural outside the Valley Institute of Visual Arts in Sherman Oaks, California had died when a property owner refused to allow Twitchell access. In 1995, while being repainted after a legal settlement, the mural was covered with graffiti. In early 2016, Twitchell received approval from Los Angeles Valley College to repaint the mural. The $180,000 cost was raised by a voter-approved community colleges bond-building program.

== Selected filmography ==
=== Films ===
- The Hucksters (1947)
- Beauty on Parade (1950)
- Father Is a Bachelor (1950)
- Spencer's Mountain (1963) - Grandma Spencer
- Marnie (1964) - Mrs. Maitland (uncredited)

=== Television ===
- Alfred Hitchcock Presents (1956) (Season 2 Episode 5: "None Are So Blind") - Neighbor
- Have Gun-Will Travel (1960) - Miss Felton ("Annie") in Season 3 Episode 23 "Lady on the Wall"
- Rawhide (1961) – Mrs. Lefever in S4:E2, "The Sendoff"
- Dragnet (TV series) (1968) - Bird Lady in Season 3 Episode 7, "Robbery: Dr-15"
