= Mary Ellen Kay =

American actress (1929–2017)

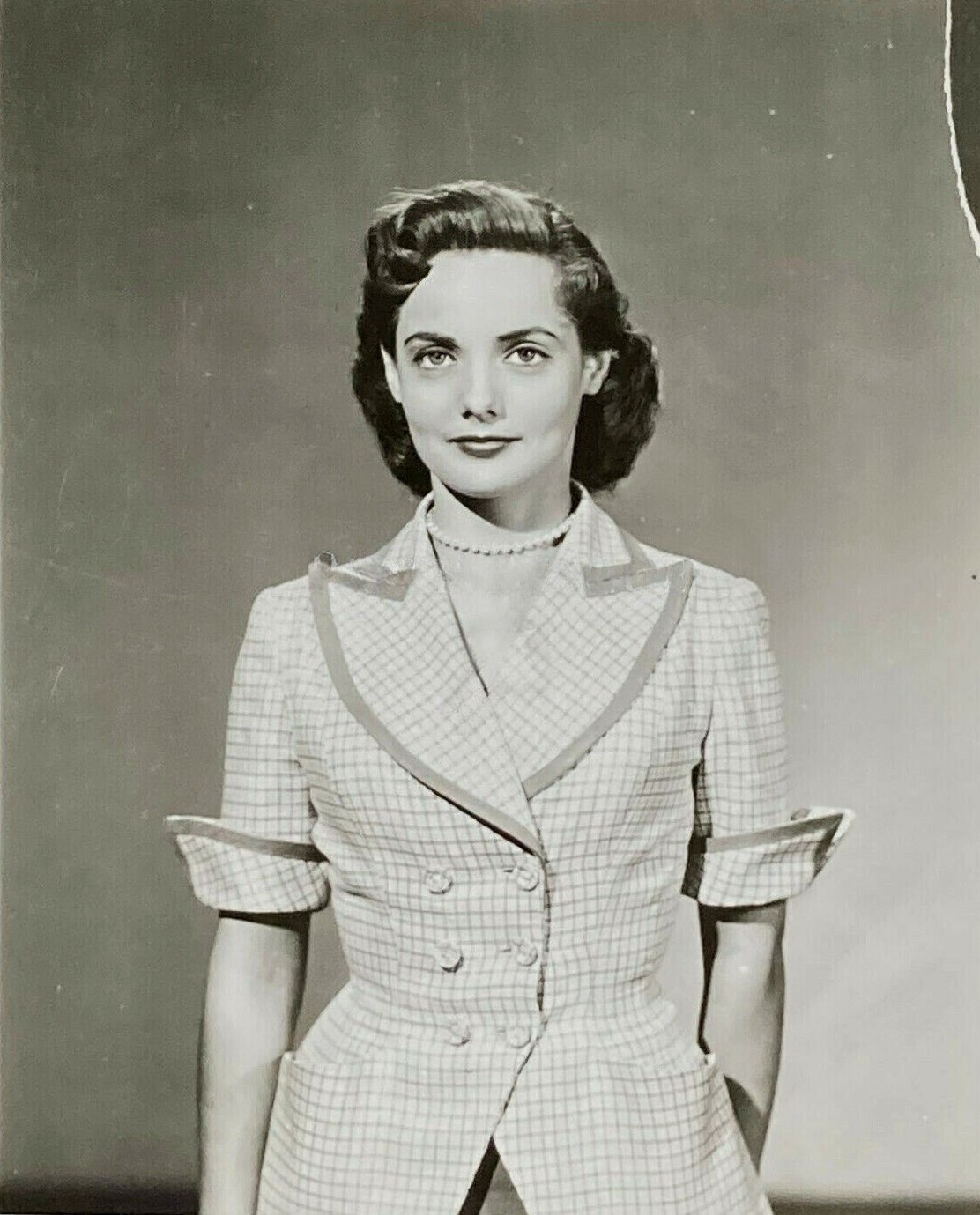
- Mary Ellen Kay in Government Agents vs. Phantom Legion (1951)
- Born: Mary Ellen Keaggy; August 29, 1929; Boardman, Ohio, U.S.
- Died: 2017 (aged 87–88)
- Occupation: Actress
- Years active: 1950–1966 (film)
- Spouse(s): New York cosmetics executive (1954-1959); Tim Ruffalo (1963-1993) his death
- Children: 1
- Relatives: Phil Keaggy (brother)

Mary Ellen Ruffalo (née Keaggy, August 29, 1929 – 2017), better known as Mary Ellen Kay, was an American television and film actress.

== Biography ==
Kay was born in Boardman, Ohio, on August 29, 1929. She was one of ten siblings and the sister of virtuoso guitarist Phil Keaggy. Her brother credits her with introducing him to the Christian faith. Prior to her acting career, Kay was a singer, having started at the age of 6. She later toured with Gene Ryan's orchestra, and by the time she was 17, she had become a headliner in supper clubs. Her initial foray into acting occurred through Little Theatre productions in the Hollywood area. Kay co-starred with Rex Allen in 19 western films.

In 1963, she married her second husband, Tim Ruffalo. They had one son, Bill, and remained together until his passing from a stroke in 1993. In an interview dated August 14, 2018, Kay's brother, Phil Keaggy, revealed that Mary Ellen had died in 2017 at the age of 87.

== Selected filmography ==
- Girls' School (1950)
- Streets of Ghost Town (1950)
- Tarzan and the Slave Girl (1950)
- Fort Dodge Stampede (1951)
- Desert of Lost Men (1951)
- Rodeo King and the Senorita (1951)
- Silver City Bonanza (1951)
- Government Agents vs. Phantom Legion (serial) (1951)
- Colorado Sundown (1952)
- The Last Musketeer (1952)
- Vice Squad (1953)
- Yukon Vengeance (1954)
- The Long Wait (1954)
- Thunder Pass (1954)
- Runaway Daughters (1956)
- Voodoo Woman (1957)
- Buffalo Gun (1961)

== Bibliography ==
- Bernard A. Drew. Motion Picture Series and Sequels: A Reference Guide. Routledge, 2013.
