= Wallflower (film) =

1948 film by Frederick de Cordova

- Theatrical release poster
- Directed by: Frederick de Cordova
- Screenplay by: Henry Ephron; Phoebe Ephron
- Based on: Wallflower; 1944 play by Reginald Denham; Mary Orr
- Produced by: Alex Gottlieb
- Starring: Robert Hutton; Joyce Reynolds; Janis Paige; Edward Arnold; Barbara Brown; Jerome Cowan
- Cinematography: Karl Freund
- Edited by: Folmar Blangsted
- Music by: Friedrich Hollaender
- Production company: Warner Bros. Pictures
- Distributed by: Warner Bros. Pictures
- Release date: June 13, 1948
- Running time: 77 minutes
- Country: United States
- Language: English

Wallflower is a 1948 American comedy film directed by Frederick de Cordova, written by Henry Ephron and Phoebe Ephron adapted from the play of the same name by Reginald Denham and Mary Orr, and starring Robert Hutton, Joyce Reynolds, Janis Paige, Edward Arnold, Barbara Brown and Jerome Cowan. It was released by Warner Bros. Pictures on June 13, 1948.

== Plot ==
Joy Linnett and her stepsister Jackie miss a flight home to Ohio, but the attractive Joy, accustomed to getting her way with men, flirts with pilot Stevie Wilson until he agrees to personally fly the two young women.

At home, old beau Warren James comes calling and invites Jackie to a country club's dance. As soon as Joy emerges in a swimsuit, the smitten Warren not only neglects Jackie, he invites her sister to the dance.

A quarrel ensues between the women's parents. Jackie's dad is outraged by the way his daughter is treated, but Joy's mom says he's just miffed that her daughter is more popular than his.

Stevie calls out of the blue, giving Jackie an idea. She emulates her sister's behavior and wardrobe, persuading Stevie to accompany her to the dance. Once there, all the men get a look at the new Jackie and line up to dance with her, as sister Joy looks on, delighted. Now it is Warren who is neglected, so much so that he gets drunk and proposes marriage to both sisters. In the end, he comes to appreciate that Jackie is the one he really loves.

== Cast ==
- Robert Hutton as Warren James
- Joyce Reynolds as Jackie Linnett
- Janis Paige as Joy Linnett
- Edward Arnold as Andrew J. Linnett
- Barbara Brown as Mrs. Jessie Linnett
- Jerome Cowan as Robert 'Bob' James
- Don McGuire as Stevie Wilson
- Ann Shoemaker as Mrs. Dixie James
- Lotte Stein as Minna the Housekeeper

== Reception ==
T.M.P. of The New York Times reviewed the film positively, describing the plot and direction as unoriginal but praising the screenwriters for their adaptation of the original play and commenting positively on the acting.
