= Black Hills Ambush =

1952 film

- Film poster
- Directed by: Harry Keller
- Written by: Ronald Davidson; M. Coates Webster
- Produced by: Harry Keller
- Starring: Allan Lane; Leslie Banning; Eddy Waller
- Cinematography: Bud Thackery
- Edited by: Tony Martinelli
- Music by: Stanley Wilson
- Production company: Republic Pictures
- Distributed by: Republic Pictures
- Release date: May 20, 1952
- Running time: 53 minutes
- Country: United States
- Language: English

Black Hills Ambush is a 1952 American Western film directed by Harry Keller and starring Allan Lane, Leslie Banning and Eddy Waller.

== Cast ==
- Allan Lane as Rocky Lane
- Black Jack as Black Jack
- Eddy Waller as Nugget Clark
- Leslie Banning as Sally
- Roy Barcroft as Henchman Bart
- Michael Hall as Larry Stewart
- John Vosper as Gaines
- Ed Cassidy as Sheriff
- John L. Cason as Henchman Jake
- Wes Hudman as Wagon Driver
- Michael Barton as Clay Stewart
- Art Dillard as 2nd Wagon Driver

== Bibliography ==
- Bernard A. Drew. Motion Picture Series and Sequels: A Reference Guide. Routledge, 2013.
