= George Washington Slept Here =

1942 film by William Keighley

- Film poster
- Directed by: William Keighley
- Screenplay by: Everett Freeman
- Based on: 1940 Play: by Moss Hart and George S. Kaufman
- Produced by: Jerry Wald
- Starring: Jack Benny; Ann Sheridan; Charles Coburn
- Cinematography: Ernest Haller
- Edited by: Ralph Dawson
- Music by: Adolph Deutsch
- Production company: Warner Bros. Pictures
- Distributed by: Warner Bros. Pictures
- Release date: November 28, 1942
- Running time: 93 minutes
- Country: United States
- Language: English
- Box office: $1.3 million (US rentals)

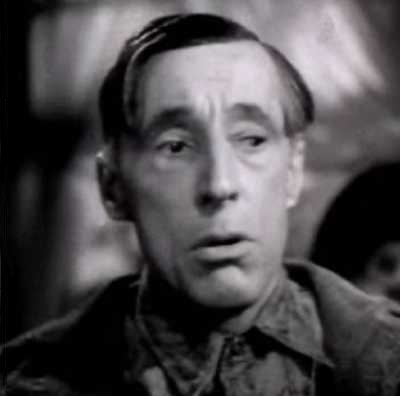
Percy Kilbride

George Washington Slept Here is a 1942 comedy film starring Jack Benny, Ann Sheridan, Charles Coburn, Percy Kilbride, and Hattie McDaniel. It was based on the 1940 play of the same name by Moss Hart and George S. Kaufman, adapted by Everett Freeman, and was directed by William Keighley.

The Warner Archive Collection released the film on DVD in November 2013. George Washington Slept Here was cited in the John Wayne film Operation Pacific (1951) when two American submarines traded films at sea. It was traded for Destination Tokyo.

== Plot ==
Manhattanite Connie Fuller (Ann Sheridan) secretly acquires a dilapidated house in rural Bucks County, Pennsylvania, without her husband Bill's (Jack Benny) knowledge. The couple were forced out of their New York City apartment after their dog damaged the carpets. The house Connie buys is believed to have served as George Washington's temporary home during the Revolutionary War. Connie takes Bill on a tour of the countryside including the house, hoping that Bill will fall in love with it.

Connie's plan is to surprise her husband with the news that they own the house but is frustrated when he announces that he hates it. Bill only sees the poor condition of the house and its poor location for commuting into the city. Having nowhere else to live, they move into the house. Connie's sister Madge (Joyce Reynolds) moves with them. They hire Mr. Kimber (Percy Kilbride) to help with the renovations. They uncover evidence that it was not Washington who had slept there, but Benedict Arnold. Connie's spoiled nephew Raymond (Douglas Croft) also moves into the home during the summer. Connie's wealthy uncle Stanley (Charles Coburn) plans to visit also.

One rainy day, married actors Rena Leslie (Lee Patrick) and Clayton Evans (John Emery) seek shelter from the downpour. Madge falls in love with Clayton and plans to run away with him, abandoning Rena. Bill suspects Connie of infidelity with local antiques dealer Jeff Douglas (Harvey Stephens) and confronts her. Connie explains that Jeff helped her determine that they own a well and an access road - facilities that their unfriendly neighbor Prescott (Charles Dingle) claims as his.

Prescott uses the poor state of the Fullers' house to engineer a foreclosure against them, intending to buy their forfeited property at auction afterward. The Fullers desperately seek funds to finish the renovations and stop the foreclosure. They ask Stanley to finance them, but he reveals that he has been secretly bankrupt since the Depression in 1929. Instead, he helps them with their lawful claim to the well and service road. Everything changes for the better when the Fullers' dog digs up a boot on the property, containing a letter written by George Washington. The valuable historical find is worth enough money for the couple to complete the renovations and stop Prescott's attempts to buy them out.

The arrival of the expected 17-year locusts leads to the accidental discovery of the well that the couple need.

== Cast ==
- Jack Benny as Bill Fuller
- Ann Sheridan as Connie Fuller
- Charles Coburn as Uncle Stanley J. Menninger
- Percy Kilbride as Mr. Kimber, the handyman
- Hattie McDaniel as Hester, the Fullers' maid
- William Tracy as Steve Eldridge
- Joyce Reynolds as Madge
- Lee Patrick as Rena Leslie
- Charles Dingle as Mr. Prescott
- John Emery as Clayton Evans
- Douglas Croft as Raymond
- Harvey Stephens as Jeff Douglas

== Production ==
Jack Benny was starring in his first Warner Bros. feature, and when the stage play George Washington Slept Here was proposed, Benny went to a performance. In the original stage production, it was the husband, not the wife, who bought the property, and had been the "straight man". The focus was changed for the film, reversing the roles to play into Benny's established persona of being a miser as well as the comic foil. Originally, Olivia de Havilland was to be cast as the female lead.

To recreate the country home that was central to the film's plot, the house in Arsenic and Old Lace (1944) which was actually shot in 1941 for a later theatrical release, was used. To ensure it looked the part of a dilapidated home, Warner Bros. crews knocked out bannisters, rafters and floors on the set. There is dialogue in Arsenic and Old Lace where one officer asks another, "Did George Washington ever do any sleeping around here?" to which the reply is "Of course he did." According to syndicated columnist Ted Gill, 100 tons of ranch land soil were used to build the set for the house exterior, which was built on an interior set for reasons of wartime economy. The cast and crew dealt with "bugs, ticks and other insects" that migrated into the studio via the grass and shrubbery brought in to dress the set.

== Reception ==
In his review for The New York Times, Bosley Crowther wrote "just knock-about fun. Mr. Benny goes through his paces with his customary strain on shoe-leather, whines and pulls his hair (figuratively) with the air of a martyred saint. Miss Sheridan plays straight to his foibles, but does so quite fetchingly, and Percy Kilbride is highly amusing as a dead-panned, laconic hired hand. Charles Coburn plays the four-flushing uncle with gleeful treachery and Hattie McDaniel, Douglas Croft and Charles Dingle are amusing in other roles."

== Awards and honors ==
George Washington Slept Here was nominated for an Oscar for Best Art Direction for Max Parker, Mark-Lee Kirk and Casey Roberts.

== Adaptations to other media ==
George Washington Slept Here was adapted as a half-hour radio play for the November 8, 1943 broadcast of The Screen Guild Theater, starring Carole Landis and Jack Carson. It also was presented on the November 23, 1947 broadcast of the Ford Theatre with Karl Swenson and Claudia Morgan in lead roles.

== See also ==
- Mr. Blandings Builds His Dream House
- The Money Pit
