= Renegades of the Sage =

1949 film

- Theatrical release poster
- Directed by: Ray Nazarro
- Screenplay by: Earle Snell
- Produced by: Colbert Clark
- Starring: Charles Starrett; Smiley Burnette; Leslie Banning; Trevor Bardette; Douglas Fowley; Jock Mahoney
- Cinematography: Fayte M. Browne
- Edited by: Paul Borofsky
- Production company: Columbia Pictures
- Distributed by: Columbia Pictures
- Release date: November 24, 1949
- Running time: 56 minutes
- Country: United States
- Language: English

Renegades of the Sage is a 1949 American Western film directed by Ray Nazarro and written by Earle Snell. The film stars Charles Starrett, Smiley Burnette, Leslie Banning, Trevor Bardette, Douglas Fowley and Jock Mahoney. The film was released on November 24, 1949, by Columbia Pictures. This was the forty-third of 65 films in the Durango Kid series.

== Cast ==
- Charles Starrett as Steve Duncan / The Durango Kid
- Smiley Burnette as Smiley Burnette
- Leslie Banning as Ellen Miller
- Trevor Bardette as Miller
- Douglas Fowley as Sloper
- Jock Mahoney as Lt. Hunter
- Fred F. Sears as Lt. Jones
- Jerry Hunter as Johnny
- Selmer Jackson as Brown
- George Chesebro as Worker
- Frank McCarroll as Drew
