= Beauty on Parade (film) =

1950 American drama film

- Directed by: Lew Landers
- Written by: George Bricker; Arthur E. Orloff
- Produced by: Wallace MacDonald
- Starring: Robert Hutton; Ruth Warrick; Lola Albright
- Cinematography: Vincent J. Farrar
- Edited by: Aaron Stell
- Music by: Mischa Bakaleinikoff
- Production company: Columbia Pictures
- Distributed by: Columbia Pictures
- Release date: March 18, 1950 (Los Angeles)
- Running time: 66 minutes
- Country: United States
- Language: English

Beauty on Parade is a 1950 American drama film directed by Lew Landers and starring Robert Hutton, Ruth Warrick and Lola Albright. It opened in Los Angeles on March 18, 1950, as the second feature to Guilty of Treason.

== Plot ==
Having abandoned her dreams of beauty-queen stardom 20 years earlier when she married, a mother channels her ambitions through her young daughter, who win a beauty pageant and is entered into a national contest.

== Cast ==
- Robert Hutton as Gil McRoberts
- Ruth Warrick as Marian Medford
- Lola Albright as Kay Woodstock
- John Ridgely as Jeffrey Woodstock
- Hillary Brooke as Gloria Barton
- Wally Vernon as Sam Short
- Jimmy Lloyd as Johnny Fennell
- Donna Gibson as Mona Booker
- Frank Sully as Murph
- Robert C. Hasha as Walker
- Lillian Bronson as Mrs. Enfield-Hyphen-Hatch

== Bibliography ==
- Bernard F. Dick. Columbia Pictures: Portrait of a Studio. University Press of Kentucky, 2015.
