= The Last Musketeer =

1952 film

- Theatrical release poster
- Directed by: William Witney
- Screenplay by: Arthur E. Orloff
- Produced by: Edward J. White
- Starring: Rex Allen; Mary Ellen Kay; Koko; Slim Pickens; James Anderson; Boyd Morgan; Monte Montague
- Cinematography: John MacBurnie
- Edited by: Harold Minter
- Music by: Nathan Scott; R. Dale Butts
- Production company: Republic Pictures
- Distributed by: Republic Pictures
- Release date: March 1, 1952
- Running time: 67 minutes
- Country: United States
- Language: English

The Last Musketeer is a 1952 American Western film directed by William Witney, written by Arthur E. Orloff and starring Rex Allen, Mary Ellen Kay and Slim Pickens. The film was released on March 1, 1952 by Republic Pictures.

== Plot ==
A greedy rancher is charging excessive prices for access to the area's only water supply, extorting the smaller ranchers in the area. A water diviner teams with a cattle buyer to force the villain to share the water with his neighbors.

== Cast ==
- Rex Allen as Rex Allen
- Koko as Koko
- Mary Ellen Kay as Sue
- Slim Pickens as Slim Pickens
- James Anderson as Russ Tasker
- Boyd Morgan as Barney
- Monte Montague as Matt Becker
- Michael Hall as Johnny Becker
- Al Bridge as Lem Shaver
- Stan Jones as Sheriff Blake
- The Republic Rhythm Riders as Musicians / Cowhands
