= Frank Arrigo =

American art director (1917–1977)

- Born: November 3, 1917; Los Angeles, California, U.S.
- Died: May 9, 1977 (aged 59); Los Angeles, California, U.S.
- Occupation: Art director
- Years active: 1945 - 1977 (film & TV)

Frank Arrigo (1917–1977) was an American art director. He worked on more than a hundred and fifty films and television series during his career. From 1959 to 1971 he also directed episodes of several television series.

== Selected filmography ==
- Will Tomorrow Ever Come? (1947)
- Rustlers of Devil's Canyon (1947)
- Renegades of Sonora (1948)
- Heart of Virginia (1948)
- Duke of Chicago (1949)
- Sheriff of Wichita (1949)
- Rustlers on Horseback (1950)
- Under Mexicali Stars (1950)
- Gunmen of Abilene (1950)
- Desert of Lost Men (1951)
- Buckaroo Sheriff of Texas (1951)
- Captive of Billy the Kid (1952)
- Lady Possessed (1952)
- Savage Frontier (1953)
- Fair Wind to Java (1953)
- Iron Mountain Trail (1953)
- Down Laredo Way (1953)
- Sea of Lost Ships (1953)
- Phantom Stallion (1954)
- Jubilee Trail (1954)
- Untamed Heiress (1954)
- The Fighting Chance (1955)
- Come Next Spring (1956)
- Lisbon (1956)
- Hell's Crossroads (1957)
- Duel at Apache Wells (1957)
- Affair in Reno (1957)

== Bibliography ==
- Pitts, Michael R. Western Movies: A Guide to 5,105 Feature Films. McFarland, 2012.
