= Silver City Bonanza =

1951 film by George Blair

- Theatrical release poster
- Directed by: George Blair
- Screenplay by: Robert Creighton Williams
- Produced by: Melville Tucker
- Starring: Rex Allen; Buddy Ebsen; Mary Ellen Kay; Billy Kimbley; Alix Ebsen; Bill Kennedy
- Cinematography: John MacBurnie
- Edited by: Robert M. Leeds
- Music by: Stanley Wilson
- Production company: Republic Pictures
- Distributed by: Republic Pictures
- Release date: March 1, 1951
- Running time: 67 minutes
- Country: United States
- Language: English

Silver City Bonanza is a 1951 American Western film directed by George Blair, written by Robert Creighton Williams and starring Rex Allen, Buddy Ebsen, Mary Ellen Kay, Billy Kimbley, Alix Ebsen and Bill Kennedy. The film was released on March 1, 1951 by Republic Pictures.

== Cast ==
- Rex Allen as Rex Allen
- Buddy Ebsen as Gabe Horne
- Mary Ellen Kay as Katie McIntosh
- Billy Kimbley as Jimmy McIntosh
- Alix Ebsen as Susie McIntosh
- Bill Kennedy as Monk Monroe
- Gregg Barton as Henchman Hank
- Clem Bevans as Town Loafer
- Frank Jenks as Theater Owner
- Hank Patterson as Postman
- Harry Lauter as Pete Horne
- Harry Harvey, Sr. as Groggins
