= Clem Bevans =

American actor (1879–1963)

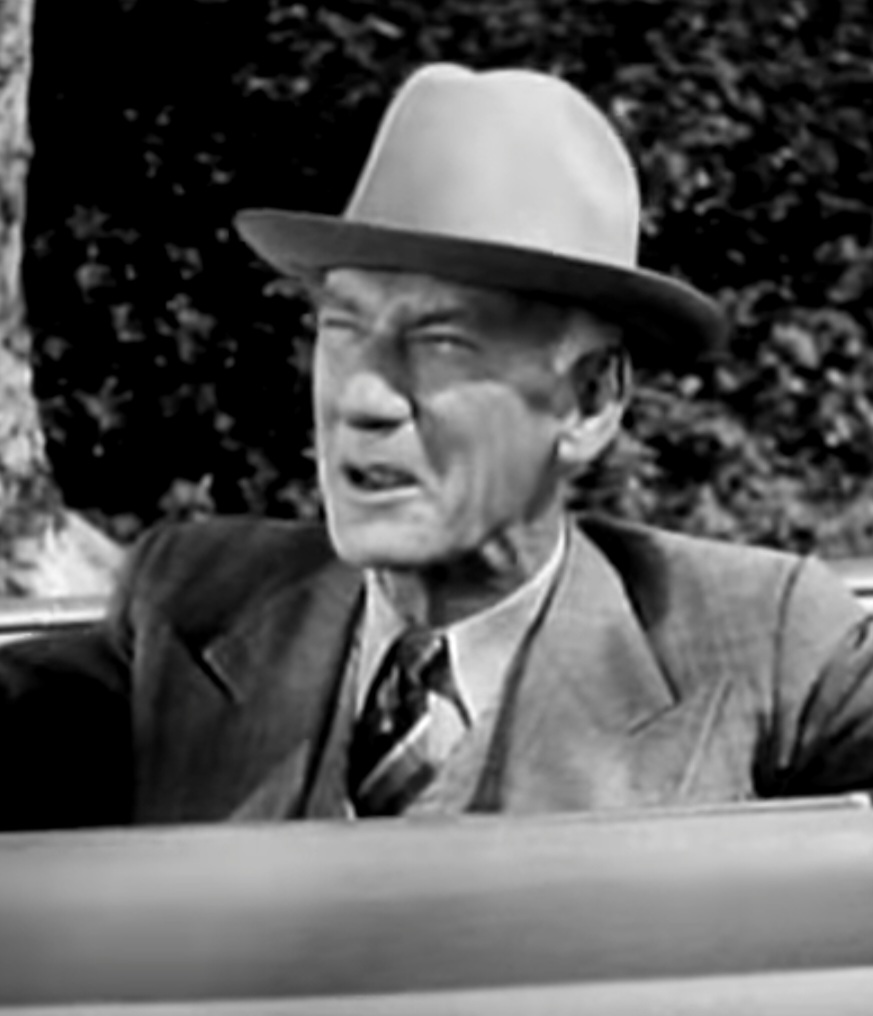
- Bevans in Half a Sinner (1940)
- Born: Clem Guy Bevans; October 16, 1879; Cozzadale, Ohio, U.S.
- Died: August 11, 1963 (aged 83); Woodland Hills, California, U.S.
- Resting place: Valhalla Memorial Park Cemetery, North Hollywood
- Occupation: Actor
- Years active: 1900–1962
- Spouse(s): Edith May Sketchley (m. 1905; div. 19??) Lillian Luppee (m. 1930)
- Children: 4

Clem Guy Bevans (October 16, 1879 – August 11, 1963) was an American character actor best remembered for playing eccentric, grumpy old men.

== Early life ==
Bevans was born in Cozzadale, Ohio.

== Career ==
Bevans's career began in vaudeville in 1900 in an act with Grace Emmett. He went on to perform in stock theater and light opera, eventually achieving stardom after 45 years, at age 67. Watching David Warfield "turn comedy to pathos by creating the character of a sad old man" in 1901 prompted Bevans to portray old men. He spent time in country stores in New England observing voices and gestures of old men before he began portraying old characters on stage.

Bevans's film debut came in Way Down East (1935). His portrayal was so good, he became stereotyped and played mostly likable old codgers for the rest of his life. He was a contract player for 20th Century Fox for a number of years. Bevans played the neighbor of Gregory Peck's character in The Yearling and the gatekeeper in Harvey (1950). However, he did occasionally play against type, for example as a Nazi spy in Alfred Hitchcock's Saboteur (1942).

Bevans made his first television appearance in the half-hour Christmas program, The Guiding Star, in 1946. His other work on TV included portraying Captain Hugo in the 1958 Perry Mason episode "The Case of the Demure Defendant" and Pete in The Twilight Zone episode "Hocus-Pocus and Frisby" (1962). He played Captain Cobb in Disney's TV miniseries Davy Crockett.

He was the last surviving charter member of the Screen Actors Guild.

== Personal life and death ==
Bevans and his wife had two adopted daughters. On August 11, 1963, he died at the Motion Picture & Television Country House and Hospital in Woodland Hills, California, aged 83. His remains are interred at Valhalla Memorial Park Cemetery in North Hollywood.

== Filmography ==
Year	Title	Role	Director	Notes
1935	Way Down East	Doc Wiggin	Henry King	
1936	Two in Revolt	Mr. Woods	Glenn Tryon	Uncredited
1936	Rhythm on the Range	Gila Bend	Norman Taurog	
1936	The Phantom Rider	Mr. Hudson	Ray Taylor	Serial chapters 11–13
1936	The President's Mystery	Bus Passenger	Phil Rosen	Uncredited
1936	Come and Get It	Gunnar Gallagher	William Wyler	Uncredited
1937	Dangerous Number	Monte Christo (Actor Friend)	Richard Thorpe	Uncredited
1937	Angel's Holiday	Sheriff	James Tinling	Uncredited
1937	Mountain Music	Medicine Show Spectator	Robert Florey	Uncredited
1937	Riding on Air	Sheriff	Edward Sedgwick	
1937	Marry the Girl	W.W. McIntosh	William C. McGann	Uncredited
1937	Topper	Board Member	Norman Z. McLeod	Uncredited
1937	The Toast of New York	Hungry Panhandler	Rowland V. Lee	uncredited
1937	Big City	Grandpa Sloane	Frank Borzage	
1937	Idol of the Crowds	Andy Moore	Arthur Lubin	
1938	Of Human Hearts	Elder Massey	Clarence Brown	
1938	One Wild Night	Deaf old man	Eugene Forde	Uncredited
1938	Young Fugitives	Benjie Collins	John Rawlins	
1938	Mr. Chump	Pop	William Clemens	uncredited
1938	Valley of the Giants	Clem – Old Man	William Keighley	Uncredited
1938	Comet Over Broadway	Benson	John Farrow (uncredited)	
1938	Tom Sawyer, Detective	Sheriff Slocum	Louis King	
1939	Stand Up and Fight	Bum in jail	W.S. Van Dyke	Uncredited
1939	King of the Underworld	Villager #3	Lewis Seiler	Uncredited
1939	Ambush	Pop Stebbins	Kurt Neumann	
1939	They Made Me a Criminal	Second Fight Ticket Taker	Busby Berkeley	Uncredited
1939	Idiot's Delight	Jimmy Barzek	Clarence Brown	Uncredited
1939	Yes, My Darling Daughter	Henry – Baggage Man	William Keighley	Uncredited
1939	The Oklahoma Kid	Postman	Lloyd Bacon	Uncredited
1939	Dodge City	Charley	Michael Curtiz	Uncredited
1939	Zenobia	Sheriff	Gordon Douglas	
1939	Outside These Walls	Smedley	Ray McCarey	Uncredited
1939	The Kid from Kokomo	Man who didn't turn around	Lewis Seiler	Uncredited
1939	Undercover Doctor	Sam Whitmore	Louis King	
1939	Maisie	Station Agent	Edwin L. Marin	Uncredited
1939	Hell's Kitchen	Mr. Quill	E. A. Dupont	
1939	The Cowboy Quarterback	Lem, the Mailman	Noel M. Smith	
1939	Night Work	Smokestack Smiley	George Archainbaud	
1939	Thunder Afloat	'Cap' Finch	George B. Seitz	
1939	Main Street Lawyer	Zeke	Dudley Murphy	
1940	Abe Lincoln in Illinois	Ben Mattling	John Cromwell	
1940	Young Tom Edison	Mr. Waddell	Norman Taurog	
1940	Granny Get Your Gun	Smokey	George Amy	
1940	Half a Sinner	Snuffy	Al Christie	
1940	20 Mule Team	Chuckawalla	Richard Thorpe	
1940	The Captain Is a Lady	Samuel Darby	Robert B. Sinclair	
1940	Untamed	'Smokey' Moseby, the Blind Man	George Archainbaud	
1940	Gold Rush Maisie	'Pop' Graybeard	Norman Taurog	Uncredited
1940	Girl from God's Country	Ben	Sidney Salkow	
1940	Calling All Husbands	Judge Todd	Noel M. Smith	
1940	Wyoming	Pa McKinley	Richard Thorpe	Uncredited
1940	Who Killed Aunt Maggie?	Driver	Arthur Lubin	Uncredited
1940	Go West	Railroad Official	Edward Buzzell	Uncredited
1940	She Couldn't Say No	Eli Potter	William Clemens	
1941	Sergeant York	Zeke	Howard Hawks	
1941	The Parson of Panamint	Crabapple Jones	William C. McGann	
1941	The Smiling Ghost	Sexton	Lewis Seiler	
1941	Texas	Abilene Fight Spectator	George Marshall	Uncredited
1941	Pacific Blackout	Midas Plant Night Watchman	Ralph Murphy	
1942	Fly-by-Night	Train Station Watchman	Robert Siodmak	
1942	Captains of the Clouds	Sam 'Store-Teeth' Morrison	Michael Curtiz	
1942	Saboteur	Neilson	Alfred Hitchcock	
1942	This Gun for Hire	Scissor Grinder	Frank Tuttle	
1942	Tombstone, the Town Too Tough to Die	Tadpole Foster	William C. McGann	
1942	Mrs. Wiggs of the Cabbage Patch	Postman	Ralph Murphy	
1942	The Forest Rangers	Terry McCabe	George Marshall	
1942	Lucky Jordan	Gas Station Attendant	Frank Tuttle	
1943	Lady Bodyguard	Elmer Frawley	William Clemens	
1943	Happy Go Lucky	Mr. Smith	Curtis Bernhardt	
1943	The Human Comedy	Henderson	Clarence Brown	
1943	The Kansan	Bridge-Tender	George Archainbaud	
1943	The Woman of the Town	Buffalo Burns	George Archainbaud	
1944	Tall in the Saddle	Card Game Spectator	Edwin L. Marin	Uncredited
1945	Night Club Girl	Mayor	Edward F. Cline	
1945	Grissly's Millions	Young Tom	John English	
1945	Captain Eddie	Jabez	Lloyd Bacon	
1946	Wake Up and Dream	Henry Pecket	Lloyd Bacon	
1946	Gallant Bess	Smitty	Andrew Marton	
1946	The Yearling	Pa Forrester	Clarence Brown	
1947	Yankee Fakir	Professor Davis	W. Lee Wilder	
1947	The Millerson Case	Sheriff Luke Akers	George Archainbaud	
1947	Mourning Becomes Electra	Ira Mackel	Dudley Nichols	
1948	Relentless	Dad	George Sherman	
1948	Texas, Brooklyn & Heaven	Capt. Bjorn	William Castle	
1948	Moonrise	Jake – Coroner	Frank Borzage	
1948	Loaded Pistols	Jim Hedge	John English	
1948	The Paleface	Hank Billings	Norman Z. McLeod	
1948	Portrait of Jennie	Capt. Cobb	William Dieterle	
1948	Highway 13	Bill 'Pops' Lacy	William Berke	
1949	Big Jack	Saltlick Joe	Richard Thorpe	
1949	Streets of Laredo	Pop Lint	Leslie Fenton	
1949	Rim of the Canyon	Loco John	John English	
1949	The Gal Who Took the West	Hawley (as old Timer)	Frederick de Cordova	
1949	Deputy Marshal	Doc Allen Vinson	William Berke	
1949	Tell It to the Judge	Alonzo K. Roogle	Norman Foster	
1950	Hurricane At Pilgrim Hill	Sam Smedley	Richard L. Bare	
1950	Joe Palooka Meets Humphrey	Mr. Edwards	Jean Yarbrough	
1950	Harvey	Mr. Herman Shimelplatzer	Henry Koster	
1951	Silver City Bonanza	Town Loafer	George Blair	
1951	Gold Raiders	Doc Mason	Edward Bernds	
1951	Man in the Saddle	Pay Lankershim	Andre de Toth	
1952	Captive of Billy the Kid	Skeeter Davis	Fred C. Brannon	
1952	Hangman's Knot	Plunkett, the Station agent	Roy Huggins	
1953	The Stranger Wore a Gun	Jim Martin	Andre de Toth	
1954	The Boy from Oklahoma	Pop Pruty	Michael Curtiz	
1955	Ten Wanted Men	Tod Grinnel	Bruce Humberstone	
1955	The Kentuckian	Pilot of the 'River Queen'	Burt Lancaster	Uncredited
1955	The Twinkle in God's Eye	Prospector	George Blair	Uncredited
1956	Davy Crockett and the River Pirates	Captain Cobb	Norman Foster	(archive footage)
1957	The Restless Gun	Clay Davis	Justus Addiss	Episode "The Gold Buckle"
1958	Gunsmoke	Fly	Seymour Berns	Episode "Overland Express"
1958	Girl with an Itch	Gramps	Ronald V. Ashcroft	
