= Janie (1944 film) =

1944 film by Michael Curtiz

- Directed by: Michael Curtiz
- Screenplay by: Charles Hoffman; Agnes Christine Johnston
- Based on: Janie (1942 play) by Josephine Bentham; Herschel V. Williams Jr.
- Produced by: Alex Gottlieb
- Starring: Joyce Reynolds; Robert Hutton
- Narrated by: Alex Gottlieb
- Cinematography: Carl E. Guthrie
- Edited by: Owen Marks
- Music by: Heinz Roemheld
- Distributed by: Warner Bros. Pictures
- Release date: September 2, 1944
- Running time: 102 minutes
- Country: United States
- Language: English

Janie is a 1944 romantic comedy film directed by Michael Curtiz, based on a 1942 Broadway play by Josephine Bentham and Herschel V. Williams Jr. The play was adapted from Bentham's 1940 novel by the same name. It was nominated for one Academy Award, for film editing.

== Plot ==
Janie is a free-spirited teenager living in a small town. Her father, the local newspaper publisher, opposes the establishment of an army camp nearby. Janie and her bobby soxer friends are excited at the prospect of having so many young soldiers nearby. She dates one of them, which makes her boyfriend jealous.

== Cast ==
- Joyce Reynolds as Janie Conway
- Robert Hutton as Pfc. Dick Lawrence
- Edward Arnold as Charles Conway
- Ann Harding as Lucille Conway
- Alan Hale as Professor Reardon
- Robert Benchley as John Van Brunt
- Clare Foley as Elsbeth Conway
- Barbara Brown as Thelma Lawrence
- Hattie McDaniel as April
- Richard Erdman as Scooper Nolan
- Jackie Moran as Mickey the Sailor
- Ann Gillis as Paula Rainey
- Russell Hicks as Colonel Lucas
- Ruth Tobey as Bernadine Dodd
- Virginia Patton as Carrie Lou
- Colleen Townsend as Hortense Bennett
- William Frambes as Private Hackett

Unbilled players include Keefe Brasselle, Jimmie Dodd, Sunset Carson, Julie London, Virginia Sale and the Williams Brothers with Andy Williams.

== Reception ==
In a contemporary review for The New York Times, critic Bosley Crowther wrote: "The authors of Janie, play and picture, have simply cut a theatrical farce with some kids. And the bluntness with which they have done so provides very little warm appeal ... The performance of Joyce Reynolds in the title role is completely surface and pretentious; she had nothing with which to work."

The film was followed two years later by the sequel Janie Gets Married.

== See also ==
- List of American films of 1944
