= Michael Hall (actor, born 1926) =

American actor (1926–2020)

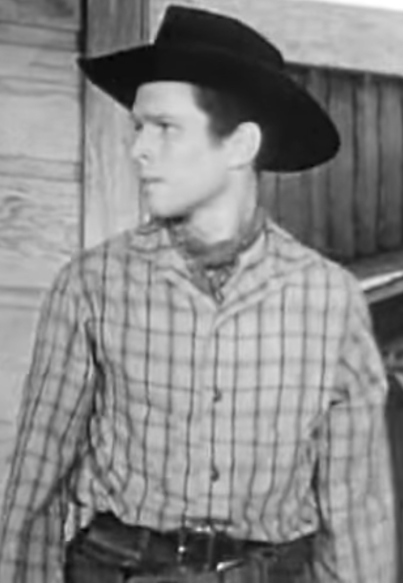
- Hall in Stories of the Century, 1954
- Born: Maurice Everett Hall Jr. September 7, 1926; Wichita, Kansas, U.S.
- Died: May 24, 2020 (aged 93); Miami Beach, Florida, U.S.
- Occupation(s): Actor, art collector, art dealer
- Years active: 1946–1960 (as actor)
- Spouse: Thomas Malmberg

Maurice Everett Hall Jr., known professionally as Michael Hall (September 7, 1926 – May 24, 2020) was an American actor who later was an art dealer and collector.

As an actor, he is best known for his role as Rob Stephenson, the son of Fredric March's character in the film The Best Years of Our Lives.

== Personal life ==
Hall was born Maurice Everett Hall Jr. on September 7, 1926, in Wichita, Kansas the only child of Maurice Everette Hall, Sr. (1897–1959) and Vera Elizabeth Bray Hall (1901–1994). His father worked in the petroleum industry and the family moved between California and Missouri during his childhood. In 1947, Maurice Sr. was reported to be a Major in the Army Air Forces based in Denver.

Hall won the declamation contest at Denver High School in 1943, and in 1947 the Boston Globe reported that he was attending the University of California at Los Angeles. Hall also said that he didn't like girls his age and found Radcliffe undergraduates to be "typical giggly undergraduates." He said that he preferred older women but that they did not like him. Studio publicity called his mother "his best pal."

Later in life he reportedly became a friend and traveling companion of the heiress Doris Duke.

== Career ==
=== Acting ===
According to Hall, the character he played in Best Years of Our Lives was not developed further because his contract ended in the middle of filming, and Samuel Goldwyn refused to pay extra to rehire him.

In a 1947 interview with the Boston Globe, Hall told the newspaper that he didn't really enjoy acting and would rather be a rancher. He said that he acted because he was "good at it," and that he had just turned down an offer to do a film in Great Britain for the Rank Organization. Hall said that he hoped to appear on Broadway in Hamlet or L'Aiglon.

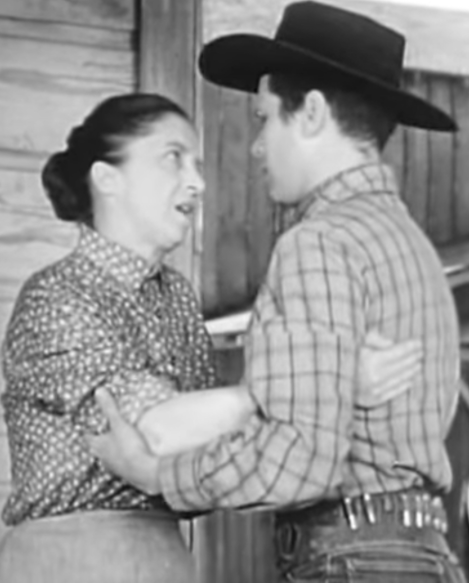
Hall (right) with Jean Inness in Stories of the Century, 1954

In addition to The Best Years of Our Lives, Hall had credited roles in three films, The Last Musketeer, Black Hills Ambush, and Blood of Dracula. He also appeared in numerous television programs in the 1950s. His last credited role as an actor was in a 1960 episode of Johnny Midnight.

=== Art collector and dealer ===
Hall's friendship with the actress Marion Davies granted him access to William Randolph Hearst's art collection as it was being dissolved. He thus was able to acquire early Chinese stone sculptures and "the purported marriage bed of the 16th-century Florentine noblewoman Maria Salviati, on which Hall subsequently slept for many years."

In 1963, following his acting career, Hall moved to New York City to work as an art collector and dealer, opening a gallery at 6 East 79th Street. His early mentors in art collecting included Wilhelm Valentiner and John Pope-Hennessy.

He ran his gallery from what has been described as "a series of progressively larger apartments and townhouses that he occupied on the Upper East Side of Manhattan, each of them filled to bursting with his ever-growing collections." Pieces from his collections would be included in exhibits and museums such as the Yale University Art Gallery and the National Gallery of Art in Washington, D.C.

He was considered an expert in Renaissance and mannerist sculpture.

== Death ==
Hall died at his home in Miami Beach, Florida, on May 24, 2020. He was survived by his husband, Thomas Malmberg.

== Filmography ==
Year	Title	Role	Notes
1946	Tomorrow Is Forever	Fraternity Boy	Uncredited
1946	The Best Years of Our Lives	Rob Stephenson	
1949	Samson and Delilah	Prince	Uncredited
1950	Katie Did It	Delivery Boy	Uncredited
1952	The Last Musketeer	Johnny Becker	
1952	Black Hills Ambush	Larry Stewart	
1953	Flight Nurse	G.I.	Uncredited
1954	Francis Joins the WACS	George	Uncredited
1957	Blood of Dracula	Glenn	
