= Joyce Reynolds (actress) =

American actress (1924–2019)

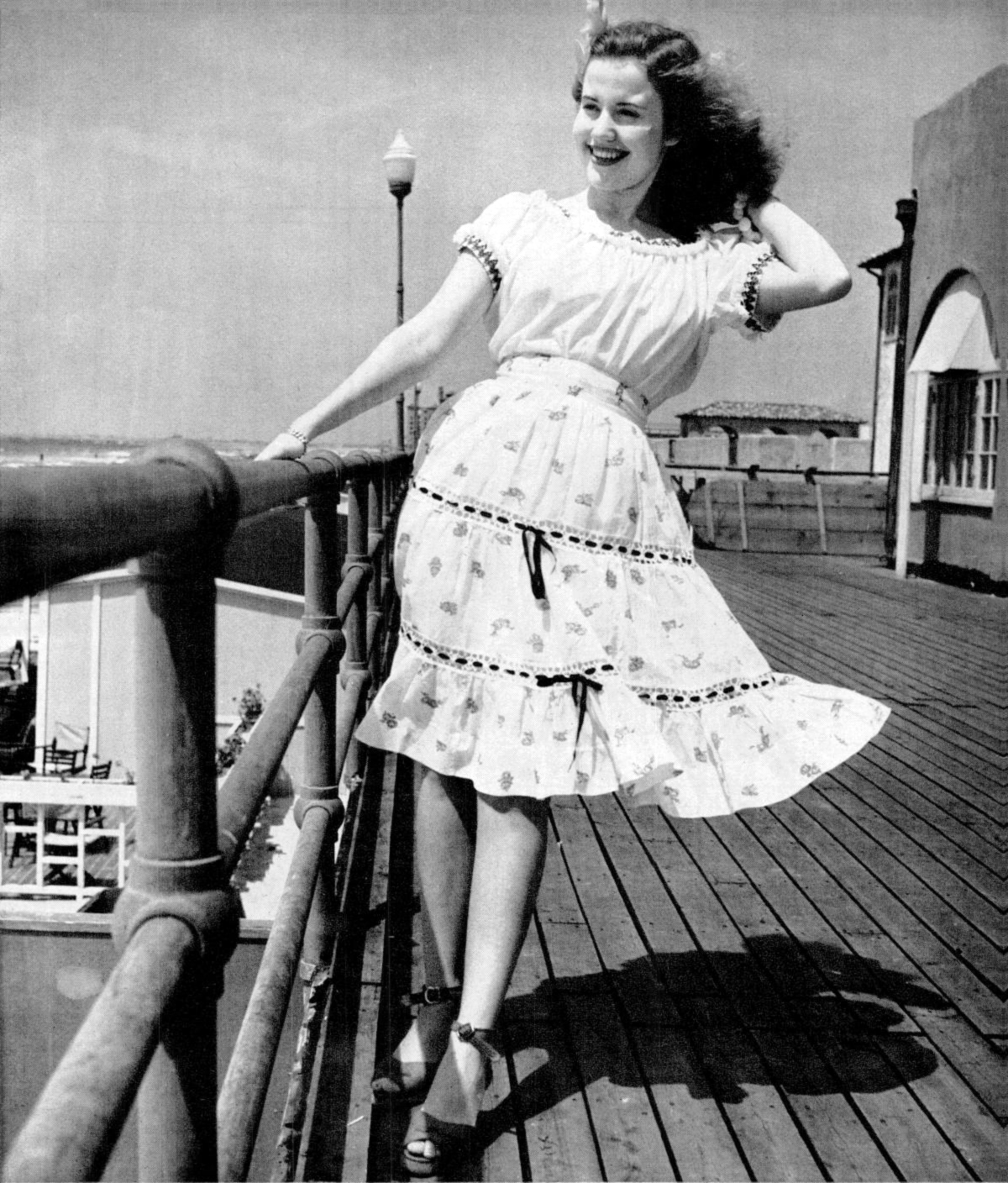
- Joyce Reynolds (1944)
- Born: Helen Joyce Reynolds; October 7, 1924; San Antonio, Texas, U.S.
- Died: September 24, 2019 (aged 94); Los Angeles, California, U.S.
- Education: University of California, Los Angeles
- Occupation: Film actress
- Years active: 1942–1950
- Spouses: Robert Lewis (m. 1945; div. 1947) Don Gallery (m. 1947; div. 1950) Carlyle Ahrens (m. 1951; div. 1953) Melvin Shaw (m. 1957, divorced) Arthur White (m. 1963; died 1980)
- Children: 2

Helen Joyce Reynolds (October 7, 1924 – September 24, 2019) was an American film actress who was under contract with Warner Bros. during the 1940s.

== Early life and education ==
Helen Joyce Reynolds was born in San Antonio, Texas on October 7, 1924 to Joel B. Reynolds and Mary (Dunn) Reynolds. She attended the University of California, Los Angeles. A talent scout who saw her in a play there arranged for a screen test, which led to a film contract.

== Career ==
Reynolds made her acting debut with a small part in the 1942 film Yankee Doodle Dandy (she is the enthusiastic teen asking the retired George M. Cohan about his show-business background). Her roles became more substantial throughout the decade, appearing in movies such as George Washington Slept Here as Madge, The Constant Nymph as Paula Sanger, and The Adventures of Mark Twain as Clara Clemens. She had top billing in the musical comedy film Janie as Janie Conway, directed by Michael Curtiz.

In 1944, she appeared in Hollywood Canteen as herself. In 1945, Warner announced that Reynolds was retiring to resume her education, and that her contract with the studio had been abrogated. Her final leading role on the big screen came in Girls' School, a 1950 melodrama for Columbia Pictures. Her Hollywood career ended in 1950, with ten credits to her name.

== Personal life and death ==
On January 11, 1945, Reynolds married Lieutenant Robert Floyd Lewis of Houston, Texas, in Hollywood. They separated in early 1947. On October 24, 1947, she married Donald Michael Gallery, the adopted son of ZaSu Pitts, in Hollywood. By 1950 the couple were estranged, and the marriage ended in divorce.

By 1951, Reynolds was running a nursery in Brentwood, California. That same year she married Dr. Carlyle L. Ahrens. Ahrens was 31 years her senior, and they divorced in March 1953. Reynolds married fourth Melvin Shaw in Arlington, Virginia on May 1, 1957, and then finally to Arthur George White in Clark County, Nevada on December 7, 1963. White died in Malibu, California on April 7, 1980, at the age of 60.

Reynolds died in Los Angeles on September 24, 2019, at the age of 94.

== Filmography ==
Year	Title	Role	Notes
1942	Yankee Doodle Dandy	Girl	uncredited
1942	George Washington Slept Here	Madge	
1943	The Constant Nymph	Paula Sanger	
1943	Thank Your Lucky Stars	Girl with book	uncredited
1944	The Adventures of Mark Twain	Clara Clemens	
1944	Janie	Janie Conway	
1944	Hollywood Canteen	Herself	
1947	Always Together	Jane Barker	
1948	Wallflower	Jackie Linnett	
1950	Girls' School	Peggy Donovan	
