= Girls' School (1950 film) =

1950 film directed by Lew Landers

- Theatrical release poster
- Directed by: Lew Landers
- Written by: Jack Henley; Brenda Weisberg
- Produced by: Wallace MacDonald
- Starring: Joyce Reynolds; Ross Ford; Kasey Rogers; Julia Dean; Thurston Hall; Leslie Banning
- Cinematography: Henry Freulich
- Edited by: Edwin H. Bryant
- Production company: Columbia Pictures
- Distributed by: Columbia Pictures
- Release date: February 9, 1950
- Running time: 62 minutes
- Country: United States
- Language: English

Girls' School is a 1950 American drama film directed by Lew Landers and starring Joyce Reynolds, Ross Ford, Kasey Rogers, Julia Dean, Thurston Hall, and Leslie Banning. The film was released by Columbia Pictures on February 9, 1950.

== Cast ==
- Joyce Reynolds as Peggy Donovan
- Ross Ford as Barry Sheppard
- Kasey Rogers as Lucille Farnsworth (as Laura Elliot)
- Julia Dean as Emily Matthews
- Thurston Hall as Colonel Selby Matthews
- Leslie Banning as Martha Frawley
- Joyce Otis as Connie Watkins
- Louise Beavers as Hattie
- Sam McDaniel as Willie Jackson
- Wilton Graff as Dave Vickers
- Grant Calhoun as Carter Ingraham
- Mary Ellen Kay as Elspeth
- Boyd Davis as Ephraim Baines
- Harry Cheshire as Calhoun Robie
- Joan Vohs as Jane Ellen
- Diantha Pattison as Louise
- Toni Newman as Henrietta
- Kay Riehl as Jane Ellen's Mother (uncredited)
