= Savage Frontier (film) =

1953 film by Harry Keller

- Directed by: Harry Keller
- Written by: Dwight V. Babcock; Gerald Geraghty
- Produced by: Rudy Ralston
- Starring: Allan Lane; Dorothy Patrick; Eddy Waller
- Cinematography: Bud Thackery
- Edited by: Harold Minter
- Music by: Stanley Wilson
- Production company: Republic Pictures
- Distributed by: Republic Pictures
- Release date: May 15, 1953
- Running time: 54 minutes
- Country: United States
- Language: English

Savage Frontier is a 1953 American Western film directed by Harry Keller and starring Allan Lane, Dorothy Patrick and Eddy Waller.

The film's sets were designed by the art director Frank Arrigo.

== Cast ==
- Allan Lane as U.S. Marshal Rocky Lane
- Black Jack as Rocky's Stallion
- Eddy Waller as Nugget Clark
- Bob Steele as Sam Webb
- Dorothy Patrick as Elizabeth Webb
- Roy Barcroft as William Oakes
- Richard Avonde as Cherokee Kid
- William Phipps as Johnny Webb
- Jimmy Hawkins as Davie
- Lane Bradford as Henchman Tulsa Tom
- John L. Cason as Henchman Buck Matson
- Kenneth MacDonald as Marshal Bradley
- William Henry as Deputy Dan Longley
- Gerry Flash as Henchman Pete
- Ed Cassidy as Townsman
- Art Dillard as Henchman
- Frank O'Connor as Townsman
- Jack O'Shea as Townsman
- Lee Shumway as Doc Pearson
- Tom Steele as Henchman

== Bibliography ==
- Bernard A. Drew. Motion Picture Series and Sequels: A Reference Guide. Routledge, 2013.
