= Hurricane at Pilgrim Hill =

1950 film

- Directed by: Richard L. Bare
- Written by: James Charles Lynch (magazine story "The Battle at Pilgrim Hill")
- Produced by: Hal Roach Jr.
- Starring: Clem Bevans; Cecil Kellaway; Virginia Grey
- Distributed by: Howco
- Release date: 1950
- Running time: 51 minutes
- Country: United States
- Language: English

Hurricane at Pilgrim Hill is a 1950 American Western television film produced by Hal Roach Jr. for Magnavox Theatre. The film was directed by Richard L. Bare and starred Clem Bevans, Cecil Kellaway and Virginia Grey. The film was included in a series of hour-long television films produced by Magnavox Theatre, it aired December 8, 1950.

== Cast ==
- Clem Bevans as Sam "Bigmouth" Smedley
- Cecil Kellaway as Jonathan Huntoon Smith
- David Bruce as Tom Adams, Smith's Attorney
- Virginia Grey as Janet Smedley Adams
- Robert Board as Steve Terhune
- Leslie Banning as Debbie Smith, Jonathan's Daughter
- Syd Saylor as Sheriff Luke Arundle
- Frank Lackteen as Broken Head (Running Deer in Credits)
- Oliver Blake as Running Deer (Broken Head in Credits)
- Billy Gray as Johnny, Bigmouth's Grandson
- Ann Doran as Katie, his mother
- Harry Hayden as Man on Train
