= Carl E. Guthrie =

American cinematographer (1905–1967)

- Born: October 15, 1905; St. Louis, Missouri
- Died: April 23, 1967 (aged 61); Los Angeles, California

Carl E. Guthrie (October 15, 1905 - April 23, 1967) was an American cinematographer.

== Career ==
He began as an assistant cameraman, working on films such as Howard Hawks's Tiger Shark (1932) with Tony Gaudio. He was known for films such as Janie (1944), Hotel Berlin (1945), Christmas in Connecticut (1945), Caged (1950), Lady Godiva of Coventry (1955), Too Much, Too Soon (1958), House on Haunted Hill (1959), and Up Periscope (1959).
