= Robert M. Leeds =

American film editor and television director

- Born: October 10, 1920; New York City, United States
- Died: October 8, 2000 (aged 79); Hemet, California, United States
- Occupation: Editor
- Years active: 1948–1957 (film)
- Spouse: Donna Douglas (m. 1971; div. 1980)

Robert M. Leeds (October 10, 1920 – October 8, 2000) was an American film editor and television director.

== Selected filmography ==
- Frisco Tornado (1950)
- Wells Fargo Gunmaster (1951)
- Silver City Bonanza (1951)
- Million Dollar Pursuit (1951)
- Return of the Beverly Hillbillies (1981)

== Bibliography ==
- Len D. Martin. The Republic Pictures Checklist: Features, Serials, Cartoons, Short Subjects and Training Films of Republic Pictures Corporation, 1935-1959. McFarland, 1998.
