= Dalbert =

Dalbert is a name. It may refer to:

- Suzanne Dalbert (1927–1970), French actress
- Dalbert (footballer) (Dalbert Henrique Chagas Estevão, born 1993), Brazilian football left-back
