= Walter Wanger =

American film producer (1894–1968)

- Born: Walter Feuchtwanger; July 11, 1894; San Francisco, California, U.S.
- Died: November 18, 1968 (aged 74); New York City, U.S.
- Education: Dartmouth College (attended)
- Occupation: Film producer
- Years active: 1921–1968
- Spouses: Justine Johnstone (m. 1919; div. 1938) Joan Bennett (m. 1940; div. 1965)
- Children: 2

Walter Wanger (born Walter Feuchtwanger; July 11, 1894 – November 18, 1968) was an American film producer. A two-time recipient of the Academy Honorary Award, he was active from the 1920s until his career concluded with the turbulent production of Cleopatra, his last film, in 1963. Strongly influenced by European films, Wanger developed a reputation as an intellectual, socially conscious film producer who spearheaded controversial but politically provocative message films and romantic melodramas. Throughout his career, he made eloquent statements about the social responsibilities of the filmmaker and his educational role in a democracy.

Born in 1894, Wanger attended Dartmouth College, where he briefly headed their theatre department. Wanger next served in the U.S. Army during World War I as an aviation pilot. During the early 1920s, Wanger joined Paramount Pictures, where he acquired the rights to The Shiek (1921). He quickly became one of Paramount's top production executives before he left due to management disputes. In 1931, he became a vice president for Columbia Pictures until he resigned to work for Metro-Goldwyn-Mayer (MGM).

After he left MGM, Wanger formed his own independent production company, in which he produced films for Paramount and United Artists (UA). Meanwhile, he served twice as president of the Academy of Motion Picture Arts and Sciences (1939–1945, with a brief interruption). In recognition of his service, he received an Academy Honorary Award in 1946.

In 1940, Wanger married actress Joan Bennett. In December 1951, believing she was having an affair with her talent agent Jennings Lang, Wanger confronted and shot Lang, who survived. Wanger pleaded guilty to assault and served three months in prison. The experience inspired him to produce the prison film Riot in Cell Block 11 (1954). Wanger later produced Invasion of the Body Snatchers (1956) and I Want to Live! (1958), which won Susan Hayward an Academy Award for Best Actress.

In 1958, Wanger signed with Twentieth Century-Fox to produce Cleopatra (1963). The production endured numerous difficulties, including a heavily publicized extramarital affair between the film's stars Elizabeth Taylor and Richard Burton. Although the film eventually became a commercial success, Cleopatra effectively ended Wanger's producing career. He died of a heart attack in New York City on November 18, 1968, aged 74.

== Early life ==
Wanger was born Walter Feuchtwanger in San Francisco. He was the son of Stella (Stettheimer) and Sigmund Feuchtwanger, who were from German Jewish families that had emigrated to the United States in the 19th century. Wanger was from a non-observant Jewish family, and later attended Episcopalian services with his wife. In order to assimilate into American society, his mother altered the family name to Wanger in 1908. The Wangers were well-connected and upper middle class, something which later differentiated Wanger from the other Jewish film moguls who came from lower class, mercantile backgrounds.

In 1905, when Wanger was eleven, his father died and his mother subsequently moved the family across the country to New York. In New York, he attended Cascadilla Preparatory School (now called Cascadilla School) in Ithaca. Wanger later studied at Dartmouth College in Hanover, New Hampshire, where he was a founding member of the Dartmouth Laboratory Theatre. After leaving college, Wanger became a professional theatrical producer in New York City where he worked with figures such as the influential British manager Harley Granville-Barker and the Russian actress Alla Nazimova.

Following the American entry into World War I in 1917, Wanger served with the U.S. Army in Italy initially in the Signal Corps where he worked as a pilot on reconnaissance missions, and later in propaganda operations directed at the Italian public. It was during this period that Wanger first came into contact with filmmaking. In April 1918 Wanger was transferred to the Committee on Public Information, and joined an effort to combat anti-war or pro-German sentiment in Allied Italy. This was partly accomplished through a series of short propaganda films screened in Italian cinemas promoting democracy and Allied war aims.

After the Allied victory, Wanger returned to the United States in 1919 and was discharged from the army. Wanger married silent film actress Justine Johnstone in 1919. He initially returned to theatre production, before a chance meeting with film producer Jesse Lasky drew him into the world of commercial filmmaking. Lasky was impressed with Wanger's ideas and his experiences in the theatre, and hired him to head a New York office vetting and acquiring books and plays for use as film stories for Famous Players–Lasky (later to become Paramount), which was then the largest film production company in the world.

== Career ==
=== 1921–1931: Paramount ===
Wanger's job at Famous Players–Lasky was to meet the studio's large annual requirement for fresh stories. One of Wanger's major successes in his early years was his selection to adapt The Sheik into a feature film. In 1921, it became an extremely successful film starring Rudolph Valentino. The film helped establish the popularity of the Orientalist genre, which Wanger returned to a number of times during his career.

By 1921, Wanger was unhappy with the salary terms he was receiving and left his job with Paramount. He travelled to Britain where he worked as a prominent cinema and theatre manager until 1924. While on a visit to London, Jesse Lasky offered to appoint him as "general manager of production" on improved terms and Wanger accepted.

Wanger's second spell with Paramount lasted from 1924 to 1931, during which time his annual wage rose from $150,000 to $250,000. He was tasked with overseeing the work of the studio heads, which meant he had little involvement with the production of individual films. Because he was based in New York, Wanger worked more closely with the company's Astoria Studios in Queens. A rivalry developed between Wanger-influenced Astoria productions and those of B. P. Schulberg, who ran the Paramount productions in Hollywood. From the mid-1920s, the company was rapidly overtaken by the recently formed Metro-Goldwyn-Mayer (MGM) as the industry's leading company. Along with the heavy financial losses incurred on big-budget films, Paramount shut down the Astoria Studios and shifted all production to Hollywood. Wanger opposed this move and felt he was being squeezed out of the company.

In 1926, Warner Bros. premiered Don Juan, a film with music and sound effects. During an intermission for Don Juan, Wanger raced into the lobby, called Lasky in California and exclaimed, "Jesse, this is a revolution!" The following year, Warner Bros. released The Jazz Singer with partial synchronized dialogue and singing scenes. In April 1928, Adolph Zukor called Paramount's studio executives into a meeting and demanded to know why they hadn't produced a sound film. Along with other film studios, Paramount initially resisted adopting sound films and continued to exclusively produce silent ones. Wanger convinced his colleagues of the importance of sound and synchronized a completed 1928 silent baseball film Warming Up to sound.

After being closed for a year, the Astoria Studios were re-opened in 1929 to make sound films, taking advantage of their close proximity to Broadway where many actors were recruited to appear in early talkies. Wanger recruited several performers including Maurice Chevalier, the Marx Brothers, Claudette Colbert, Jeanette MacDonald, Fredric March and Miriam Hopkins; directors such as George Cukor and Rouben Mamoulian; and playwrights Noël Coward, Preston Sturges, and Donald Ogden Stewart. Wanger's New York films were often adapted from stage plays and focused on sophisticated comedies, often with European settings, while Schulberg concentrated on more populist stories in Hollywood.

By 1930, Wanger's division expanded its production output to 30 films per year. Among those films were the fallen woman genre. Wanger produced Tarnished Lady (1931), which starred Tallulah Bankhead and was George Cukor's directorial debut. While these films were popular in New York, they were not as successful among regional audiences. When the Great Depression hit the film industry in the early 1930s, the Astoria Studios increasingly struggled to produce box office hits, and in December 1931 it was closed down again. Wanger was later informed that his contract would not be renewed and he left Paramount.

=== 1931–1932: Columbia ===
After he left Paramount, Wanger attempted to become an independent film producer but was unable to secure financing. In December 1931, Wanger joined Columbia Pictures when Harry Cohn, the studio's co-founder, had wanted to improve his studio's prestige from its Poverty Row past by producing special, large-budget productions each year to complement the bulk of the studio's low-budget films.

Hired as a vice president, Wanger worked in Columbia's New York story department, where he searched through literary material to adapt into films. At Wanger's insistence, they interviewed and hired inexperienced writers, one of which was Dore Schary. Within three months, he signed playwrights S. N. Behrman and Preston Sturges, and actors Bryan Foy, Bert Wheeler, and Robert Woolsey to Columbia. Also, he instituted a profit-sharing system to reduce production costs and sign non-contracted talents to Columbia.

In April 1932, Cohn asked Wanger to move to Hollywood as a production supervisor. There, Wanger acquired the screen rights to Grace Zaring Stone's 1930 novel The Bitter Tea of General Yen. Herbert Brenon was hired to direct the adaptation, but he quit Columbia because of the profit-sharing contract. Frank Capra took over as director, so Wanger consented provided he received screen credit as the producer. Released in January 1933, the film lost money because it was banned in the United Kingdom and the British Commonwealth due to its racial subject matter.

Inspired by the politically themed films, Wanger turned his attention to producing a political drama. Adapted from the novel Robert Sharon Allen and Drew Pearson, Wanger produced Washington Merry-Go-Round (1932). The film depicts Button Gwinnett Brown, a young congressman, whose campaign was supported by Prohibition bootleggers, who arrives to rid Washington, D.C. of corruption while he courts Alice Wylie, a senator's daughter. Released one month before the 1932 presidential election, the film earned favorable reviews from critics. Prior to the film's success, in August 1932, Wanger's contract with Columbia was renewed. Shortly after, Jack Cohn blocked his brother Harry's nomination of Wanger to Columbia's board of directors. Columbia later closed the New York story department, and Wanger decided to leave.

=== 1933–1934: MGM ===
In December 1932, Wanger turned down an invitation from David O. Selznick to join RKO Radio Pictures. Instead, he accepted Irving Thalberg's offer to join MGM. In January 1933, Wanger was open to producing another political melodrama. He asked MGM's story editor Samuel Marx to purchase the film rights to the novel Gabriel Over the White House by Thomas F. Tweed. The film starred Walter Huston as U.S. President Judson "Judd" Hammond, who has a near-fatal automobile accident and becomes a benevolent dictator under the divine influence of the archangel Gabriel. Eventually, he resolves the nation's crises and achieves world peace before he dies. Wanger decided not to receive screen credit, following Thalberg's mantra: "Credit you give yourself is not worth having."

In October 1932, Thalberg hired Bess Meredyth to collaborate with Salka Viertel on Queen Christina (1933), a biopic of the Queen of Sweden starring Greta Garbo. After Meredyth and Viertel submitted their third draft, Wanger hired several screenwriters Ernest Vajda, H. M. Harwood, and Joseph L. Mankiewicz to drastically rewrite it. At Garbo's request, Rouben Mamoulian was hired to direct the film. Near the end of production, Mayer objected to the film's ending, but Mamoulian and Wanger supported it. The ending was notably similar to the conclusion of The Bitter Tea of General Yen.

Before the film's release, Joseph Breen of the newly formed Production Code Administration (PCA) objected to one bedroom scene featuring Christina and her lover Antonio Pimentel de Prado after they had spent the night together in a country inn. Wanger refused to alter the scene, and in violation of the Code, the scene was sent to a jury of producers to decide. Representatives from RKO, Universal, and Fox agreed that no further cuts should be made.

Wanger next produced Another Language (1933). As filming for Queen Christina concluded, Wanger produced Going Hollywood (1933), which starred Marion Davies and Bing Crosby. For his follow-up project with Davies, Wanger and Raoul Walsh had creative differences with William Randolph Hearst. Ten days into filming, Hearst fired them both. Before he resigned MGM in May 1934, he supervised the script completion for Stamboul Quest (1934) and Vanessa: Her Love Story (1935). Wanger's resignation was due to his personal conflicts with Louis B. Mayer, and in his own words, "too much interference" from associate film producers. That same month, Variety reported that Wanger would become an independent film producer.

=== 1934–1936: Independent producer for Paramount Pictures ===
During the summer of 1934, Wanger and Jay Paley, the uncle of CBS president William S. Paley, formed JayPay Productions. They planned to produce four films in one year, which would be financed by selling $800,000 (nearly $19.9 million in 2026) of private stock to themselves and their immediate family. JayPay signed with Paramount, in which they would receive 65 percent of the profits while Paramount, as the distributor, would receive 35 percent.

Paramount wanted JayPay to have their first film ready by November 1934. Therefore, Wanger fast-tracked The President Vanishes (1934), which he considered as the third installment of his "trilogy of political productions." The film tells of President Craig Stanley, a noninterventionist, who disregards pressure from Congress to engage in a European war. When President Stanley is late for a congressional meeting, it is feared that he has been kidnapped, and a conspiracy unravels. Due in part to the film's depiction of corrupt businessmen, Wanger again faced opposition from the Production Code Association, led by Joseph Breen. Contractually obligated to have Paramount make censorship changes, one phrase which read "Join the Communist Party" was removed, though another phrase "capitalist bloodsuckers" was kept in the final film.

Having triumphed over the PCA, journalist Frank S. Nugent observed Wanger "still burns with a crusader's zeal to go out and break up this entire censorship business. He was not reticent in expressing his opinion of film censorship and, being hot-eyed with combat, those opinions, if reduced to paper, would reduce that paper to ashes." Released in December 1934, The President Vanishes received positive reviews. Andre Sennwald of The New York Times wrote the film was "an exciting example of the topical cinema, a racy and biting melodrama which assaults the war-makers with picturesque violence."

JayPay Productions was later renamed Walter Wanger Productions, with its company logo adorned with an eagle. For his next production Private Worlds (1935), Wanger cast Claudette Colbert, Charles Boyer, and his future wife Joan Bennett. Before the film's release, Paley left Wanger Productions in March 1935, frustrated by Paramount's share of the profits and The President Vanishes failing to recoup its production costs. Regardless, Wanger was promoted to a unit producer within Paramount.

Impressed with the 1934 film La Cucaracha, Wanger embraced the "three-strip" Technicolor film process with The Trail of the Lonesome Pine (1936). Departing from his usual productions filmed at the General Service Studios, Wanger decided to shoot on location at Big Bear Lake in southern California. While his productions with Paramount were box office successes, Wanger retained only $50,000 in profit for his independent studio. Despite Paramount's request, he decided to leave the studio.

=== 1936–1938: United Artists ===
In July 1936, Wanger signed a ten-year contract with United Artists (UA) to produce films independently, relocating his production unit to the studio lot. As the "executive producer in charge of production," Wanger approved the marketing campaigns for his films and exercised his right to negotiate with theater exhibitors to distribute films singly rather than block booking. At the time he signed with UA, Wanger had seven films in development—You Only Live Once (1937), Walter Wanger's Vogues of 1938 (1937), History Is Made at Night (1937), Arabian Nights (1942), A Woman Loves Once, Desert Intrigue, and an adaptation of Emily Brontë's Wuthering Heights. His roster of contracted actors included Joan Bennett, Charles Boyer, Madeleine Carroll, Henry Fonda, and Sylvia Sidney.

One month later, in August 1936, Wanger signed Fritz Lang direct You Only Live Once, which starred Fonda and Sidney. According to Sidney, the genesis came from a chance encounter between her and Wanger seated at the table, and Theodore Dreiser. At the time, Dreiser was researching Bonnie and Clyde for a magazine story and commented that if anyone ever made a film about the bank robbers, Sidney would be perfect to portray Bonnie Parker.

Years earlier, Sidney had starred in Mary Burns, Fugitive (1935), which told of a small-town coffee shop owner who falls in love with a handsome customer, unaware that he is a wanted fugitive. Wanger had produced the film at Paramount and hired screenwriters Gene Towne and Charles Graham Baker to write You Only Live Once. The new scenario involved a paroled inmate named Eddie Taylor who attempts to go straight. Married to Joan Graham, a secretary in a public defender's office, Eddie fails to land a steady job. Accused of driving a getaway car for bank robbers, Eddie pleads his innocence but is found guilty. Joan believes in her husband's innocence, breaks him out of jail, and they go on the run from the police.

Because of his success with Fury (1936), Wanger assured Lang his creative autonomy and refused to allow outside tampering with the footage during the editing process. Principal photography began in September 1936 and wrapped 15 days of retakes, which totaled 46 days of filming. When You Only Live Once was released in January 1937, the critical reception was positive, with Fonda's performance being universally applauded by film critics. However, it failed to break even at the box office.

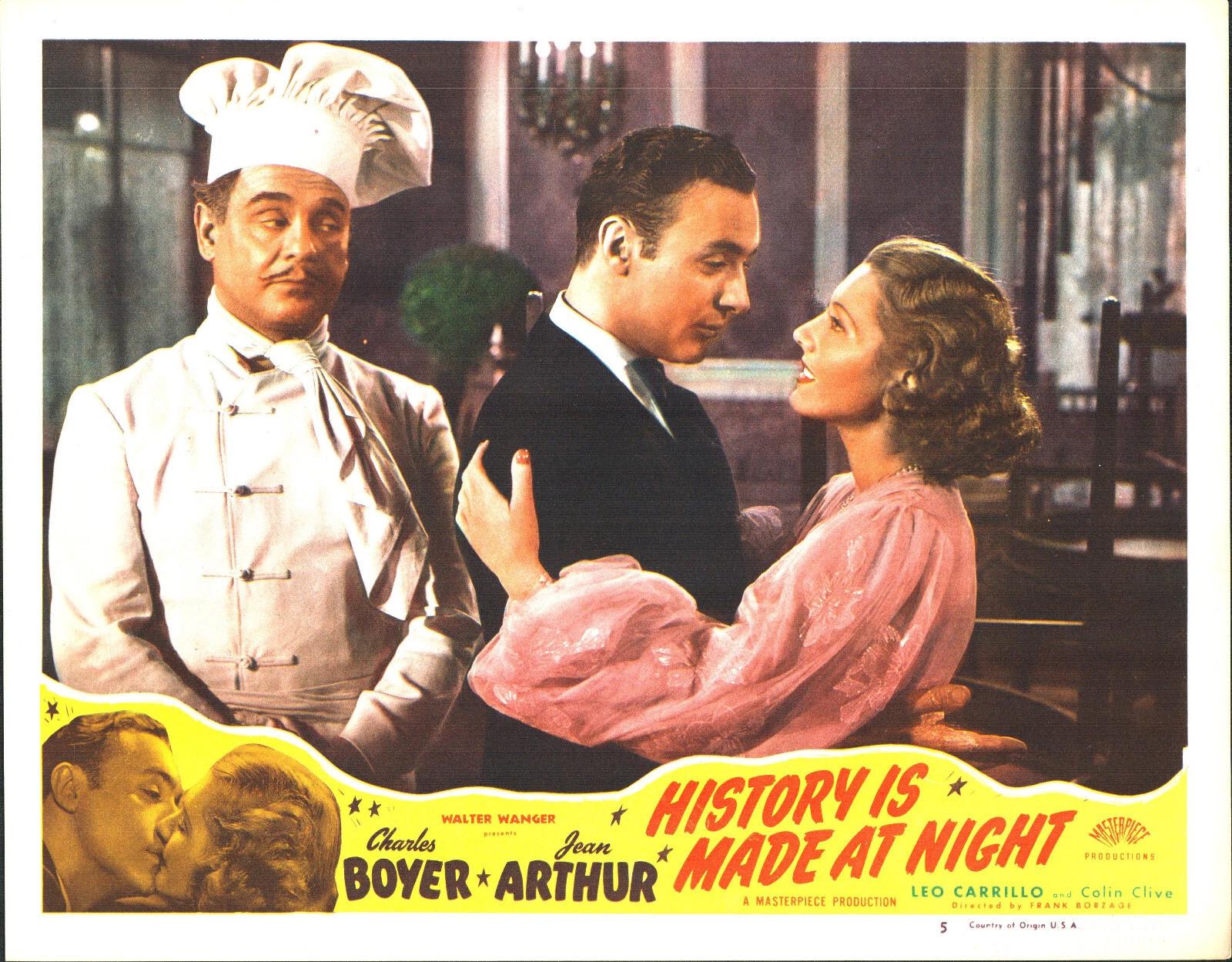
A lobby card for History Is Made at Night with Charles Boyer and Jean Arthur

For History Is Made at Night, Wanger hired Frank Borzage as director and reteamed with Towne and Baker to write the script. Production went ahead without a completed script on November 4, 1936. A romantic comedy-drama, Colin Clive portrays a jealous ex-husband who is determined to win back his wealthy divorcée (Jean Arthur) who falls for a charming Parisian (Charles Boyer). Wanger had cast Boyer based on his performance in The Garden of Allah (1936) while Arthur replaced Madeleine Carroll. Filming lasted until December 30, 1936.

After History Is Made at Night, Wanger released a follow-up titled Stand-In (1937) directed by Tay Garnett. A satire of Hollywood, Leslie Howard played a humorless accountant sent to save a floundering movie studio whose chief assets appear to be a hotheaded producer (Humphrey Bogart) and an attractive stand-in (Joan Blondell). Wanger and Garnett reteamed for the 1938 screwball comedy Trade Winds, which centered on a detective (Fredric March) as he chases a murder suspect (Joan Bennett) from San Francisco to Asia.

Wanger produced Blockade in 1938, the first major Hollywood feature film to depict the Spanish Civil War. A year earlier, the production was scheduled to begin filming as The River Is Blue and directed by Lewis Milestone, based on a script by playwright Clifford Odets. However, it was postponed when Wanger and Milestone disagreed over the casting. Wanger revived the project and hired John Howard Lawson, who envisioned a new story about a peasant's involvement with the Spanish Republicans against Francisco Franco's Nationalist insurgency when they enforce a blockade against their town.

Directed by William Dieterle, and starring Henry Fonda and Madeleine Carroll, Blockade generated controversy from the Production Code Association, which demanded rewrites to remove references to the Italian and German-backed Francoists. The film was condemned by the Catholic Church and various U.S. Catholic organizations including the Knights of Columbus within the New York City Council, all of whom supported Franco. The Knights of Columbus characterized the film as an "excursion of the motion-picture industry into the field of Leftist propaganda." They organized protests and proceeded on a measure to have the film banned in Boston. Blockade was ultimately banned in Somerville, Massachusetts.

In response, Wanger defended the project as a humanitarian plea against war's atrocities, reflecting his growing alarm over European fascism. Despite the protests, Blockade was successful at the Loew's State Theatre and the Orpheum, both in Boston. On the other hand, Fox–West Coast Theatres refused to book the film for its first-run engagements and was widely banned abroad.

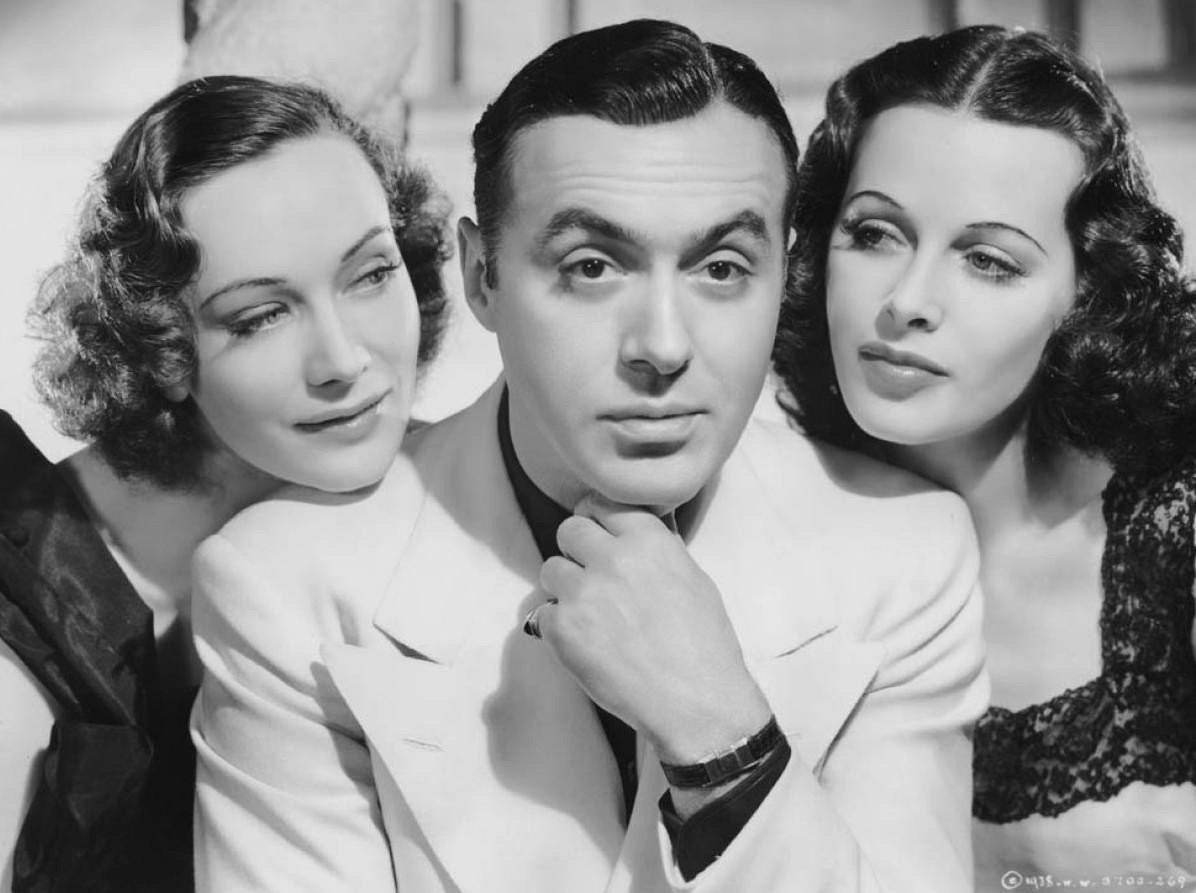
Sigrid Gurie, Charles Boyer, and Hedy Lamarr

In January 1938, Wanger purchased the distribution rights to the French film Pépé le Moko, starring Jean Gabin, and pursued a remake in which he bought all prints of the film to prevent it from competing with his film in the United States. When the first draft of the script was submitted to the PCA, Joseph Breen wrote back to Wanger that it was not acceptable as the film's two central female characters were "kept women". To tone down the script, Wanger hired James M. Cain to rewrite the first twenty minutes and later John Howard Lawson to intensify the central romance.

Retitled Algiers (1938), Charles Boyer starred as Pepe le Moko who falls for Gaby, a Parisian woman, portrayed by Hedy Lamarr, whom Wanger borrowed from MGM. Initially, Sylvia Sidney was considered for Gaby but after Lamarr was cast, she was again considered for the role of Ines. However, Sidney declined the part and Sigrid Gurie was cast. Released during the summer of 1938, Algiers was praised for the performances of Boyer and Lamarr.

By the end of 1938, Wanger's unit had released seven films, yet only two films returned a profit. The musical revue Walter Wanger's Vogues of 1938 went over budget, costing $1.4 million. Due in part to Wanger's disregard for budgets, his unit ran $640,000 in considerable debt to United Artists, Consolidated Film Industries, and the Bank of America. Most of the financial overhead was due to the actors' salaries. Eager to keep Wanger's unit financially solvent, UA permitted Wanger to borrow $2 million from the Bank of America to finance his next slate of films.

=== 1939–1945: Continued success, president of the Motion Picture Academy ===
In 1937, director John Ford purchased the screen rights to Ernest Haycox's short story "The Stage to Lordsburg." During the summer of 1938, Ford approached Wanger about the project. Wanger read the story and approved Ford's decision to hire Dudley Nichols to adapt the script, although he was apprehensive about Ford's decision to cast John Wayne as the Ringo Kid. Ford tested other actors out of courtesy to Wanger, but Ford stuck with Wayne. Nevertheless, at Wanger's insistence, Ford cast Louise Platt, a contract actress who had appeared in Wanger's earlier production I Met My Love Again (1938). Filmed in Monument Valley during the fall and winter of 1938, Wanger favored a hands-off approach.

Released in 1939, Stagecoach received universal acclaim from film critics. Variety called the film "[a] sweeping and powerful drama of the American frontier." It grossed $1.1 million at the domestic box office, and returned a net profit of $300,000. The film received seven Academy Awards nominations, including for Best Picture. It won two for Best Supporting Actor (Thomas Mitchell) and Best Scoring.

During the fall of 1939, Wanger was elected as president of the Academy of Motion Picture Arts and Sciences (AMPAS). After two years, he was later succeeded by Bette Davis, who became the first female president while Wanger was the first vice president. Davis's initiatives to reorganize the Academy were widely opposed, and after Pearl Harbor was attacked, she cancelled the Oscars banquet while the awards ceremony would be presented under a different format. Davis resigned as president on January 7, 1942, due to health issues, and was succeeded by Wanger. The banquet was reinstated "to boost civil morale" but on a more modest scale. For the 16th Academy Awards, in 1944, Wanger cancelled the banquet, moved the venue to the Grauman's Chinese Theatre, and gave free passes to 200 active military personnel. Wanger resigned as Academy president in 1945, and was awarded an Honorary Academy Award for his six-year service.

In 1940, Wanger produced Alfred Hitchcock's Foreign Correspondent, adapted from Vincent Sheean's 1935 political memoir Personal History. Four years prior, Wanger had acquired the rights for $10,000, on which numerous screenwriters worked on the script. Shortly after Britain declared war on Germany, Wanger approached Selznick about loaning out Hitchcock. Selznick agreed, stipulating Hitchcock would be available after Rebecca (1940) was completed.

Unlike Selznick, Wanger allowed Hitchcock creative control over the casting, production design, and even the final editing. He allowed Hitchcock to hire production designer William Cameron Menzies and score composer Alfred Newman from other studios. However, after the production wrapped, Wanger and Hitchcock learned that Germany began bombing England, and dissatisfied with the original ending, they asked Ben Hecht to write a new epilogue that would make the film more current. Upon its August 1940 premiere in New York, Foreign Correspondent received an enthusiastic critical reception and was a box office success. It garnered six Academy Awards nominations, including one for Best Picture, but did not win any.

Due to the success of Stagecoach, Wanger was anxious to resume his collaboration with Ford. In February 1940, he signed a two-picture contract with Argosy Pictures, co-founded by Ford and Merian C. Cooper. The first was an adaptation of one-act plays by Eugene O'Neill while the second film Eagle Squadron (1942) would be "co-produced and personally supervised" by Cooper on behalf of Argosy. Directed by Ford, Wanger's next production was The Long Voyage Home (1940). Released in the fall of 1940, The Long Voyage Home earned critical praise but was a financial flop. It also received six nominations at the Academy Awards.

Already discontent with United Artists over the distribution of The Long Voyage Home, Wanger was released from his ten-year contract with United Artists in October 1941. Wanger let the studio retain their profit share for the yet unreleased Sundown (1941) in exchange for the uncompleted footage already shot for Eagle Squadron. In November 1941, Wanger signed a lucrative deal with Universal Pictures to set up Eagle Squadron there. At Universal Pictures, Wanger's contract stipulated that he had "complete supervision and control of this production", though Universal had ultimate approval of director, cast, and final cut. Meanwhile, Wanger had full access to Universal's personnel and studio facilities, and was allowed a budget range within $700,000 (nearly $16 million in 2026). Universal and Wanger split the profits 50-50.

For Eagle Squadron, Cooper had wanted to produce the film as a documentary without a script, while Wanger favored a conventional aerial epic. Wanger's vision won out, and the film was profitable upon its initial release. Wanger's second film with Universal was Arabian Nights (1942), which the studio advanced into production following the commercial success of The Thief of Bagdad (1940) and Zoltan Korda's Jungle Book (1942). Wanger hired screenwriter Michael Hogan to write the adaptation, and cast Jon Hall and Maria Montez in leading roles.

The commercial success of Arabian Nights influenced a series of exotic Technicolor romances with Hall and Montez, which generated a cycle of second-rate costume dramas co-starring Yvonne De Carlo and Rod Cameron. Wanger produced Salome, Where She Danced (1945), which became another box office success despite poor reviews, and made Wanger the highest paid Hollywood figure behind Louis B. Mayer. Outside the Technicolor romances, Wanger had another financial success with the 1943 war film Gung Ho!. Based on the U.S. military raid of Makin Island under forces led by Lieutenant Colonel Evans Carlson, Wanger secured the film rights, though Lt. Albert J. Bolton, a Navy technical advisor, insisted that neither Carlson nor his executive officer James Roosevelt be singled out.

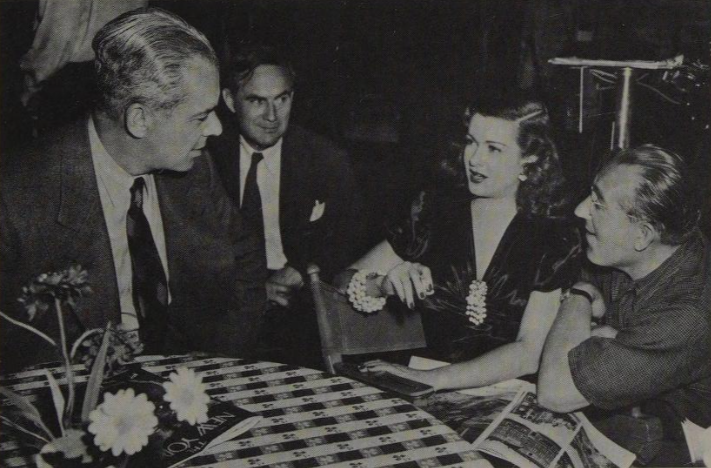
From left to right: Walter Wanger, screenwriter Dudley Nichols, Joan Bennett, and Fritz Lang.

In 1945, Wanger co-founded Diana Productions with his wife Joan Bennett and director Fritz Lang. While Lang was the majority stakeholder and held artistic control, Wanger negotiated the contracts and handled the financing and distributing. A remake of the 1931 French film La Chienne, Wanger and Lang co-produced Scarlet Street (1945) starring Bennett and Edward G. Robinson. While Lang was filming Cloak Dagger (1946) at Warner Bros., Wanger and editor Arthur Hilton made minor cuts to secure approval from the New York State Board of Censors. Upon its release in December 1945, Scarlet Street was a critical and commercial success, earning back its negative cost within six months.

=== 1946–1950: Financial difficulties ===
Their follow-up project Secret Beyond the Door (1947) fared less successfully, in which it went over schedule and over budget. Released in January 1948, the film received the worst reviews of Lang's career at that point. Bennett and Wanger departed from Diana Productions, and Wanger later moved to Eagle-Lion Films. In October 1947, Wanger signed with Eagle-Lion to produce four films a year, and was made a shareholder within Pathé Industries, Eagle-Lion's parent company. His contract also extended Wanger's contract with actress Susan Hayward. Earlier, in 1945, Wanger had placed her under a seven-year contract. Hayward was cast in Canyon Passage (1946), Smash-Up, the Story of a Woman (1947) and The Lost Moment (1947).

At Eagle-Lion, Wanger produced Tulsa (1949), another Hayward star vehicle. On Reign of Terror (1949), Wanger transferred the producing duties to William Cameron Menzies while he was occupied with Joan of Arc (1948). Due to production overhead cuts, Wanger's projects in pre-production—Annie, Queen of the Pirates and The Blank Wall—were shelved, though the former was produced into Anne of the Indies (1951) at Twentieth Century-Fox. Despite their publicity campaigns, Reign of Terror was Wanger's only postwar box office success.

In 1946, Wanger formed another independent production company, Sierra Pictures, with Ingrid Bergman and director Victor Fleming, to produce Joan of Arc (1948). Adapted from the play Joan of Lorraine by Maxwell Anderson, Wanger desired to emulate Laurence Olivier's 1944 film Henry V. He raised independent financing through stock purchasing and secured loans from MGM's parent company Loew's Inc., Security First National Bank, and Bankers Trust. By April 1947, MGM signed with Sierra Pictures to distribute the film, which was intended to begin shooting at Hal Roach Studios. Two weeks before shooting, Loew's president Nicholas Schenck asked Wanger to reduce the budget and renegotiate their completion guarantee of Sierra's bank loans. When Wanger refused, MGM withdrew from the production and four days after, he signed with RKO Radio Pictures.

RKO refused to co-finance the project, so Wanger borrowed loans from the Landau Investment Company and Eagle-Lion. Principal photography began on September 14, 1947, and ended on December 18, with Fleming directing nine days of reshoots. Joan of Arc premiered at the Victoria Theater on November 11, 1948, to a positive critical reception. Bosley Crowther of The New York Times called it "one of the most magnificent films ever made, bespeaking the vast sum of money and the effort expended on it. Dramatically, it has moments of tremendous excitement and shock."

However, it was a financial failure as the release coincided with Bergman's extramarital scandal with Roberto Rossellini while filming Stromboli (1950). Despite not being nominated for Best Picture, the film earned seven Academy Awards nominations and won two for Best Cinematography—Color and Best Costume Design—Color. Although he coveted the Thalberg Memorial Award, Wanger was handed another honorary Oscar for his "distinguished service to the industry in adding to its moral stature in the world community by his production of the picture Joan of Arc."

Financially devastated from Joan of Arc, Wanger revived The Blank Wall into The Reckless Moment (1949) with Joan Bennett and James Mason. Distributed by Columbia Pictures and directed by Max Ophüls, the film was a commercial flop, though it has since become highly regarded. In 1948, Wanger signed Greta Garbo to film an adaptation of Balzac's La Duchesse de Langeais in Italy, with Ophüls slated to write and direct. However, the production was abandoned when the financing fell through. By the spring of 1950, Wanger and Romulus Films were to co-produce The Ballad and the Source until the British censor board objected to Ophüls's script. With little income left, Wanger sold his ownership stake in his Universal-produced films to Sol Lesser. He then filed for bankruptcy on January 9, 1951, unable to repay an outstanding $178,500 loan to Bank of America for The Reckless Moment.

=== 1951–1952: Personal scandal ===
Interested in producing for television, Wanger became acquainted with Jennings Lang, talent agent of Joan Bennett, while he pitched his Aladdin television pilot to American Broadcasting Company (ABC). While Wanger was in Europe, Lang looked after Bennett when she became ill. By late 1950, Wanger began suspecting Lang was romantically involved with his wife. He hired a private detective to follow Jennings and Bennett. The detective found they had spent time in New Orleans, the Caribbean, and in a Beverly Hills apartment owned by one of Wanger's friends, agent Jay Kanter. Meanwhile, Wanger signed a nine film, three-year contract production deal with Allied Artists.

On 2:30 p.m., Friday, December 13, 1951, Wanger found his wife's green Cadillac convertible in the MCA parking lot in Beverly Hills. He returned one hour later, seeing her car still parked there, and waited for Bennett to return. At 5:30 p.m., Lang and Bennett arrived in the parking in Lang's car. After Lang helped Bennett to her convertible, he stood talking by her window. According to a parking lot attendant, who witnessed the incident, there was a violent argument between the two men, with Bennett yelling, "Get away from here and leave us alone." Though Lang held up his hands, Wanger fired two shots in his general direction. One bullet ricocheted against the vehicle while the other struck Lang in the groin, who collapsed in agony to the ground. The attendant drove Bennett and Lang to the Midway Hospital, where Lang received emergency surgery. Lang recovered without major medical complications.

Wanger was taken into police custody immediately to the Beverly Hills station across the street. "I've just shot the son of a bitch who tried to break up my home," Wanger told the officers as they arrested him. On December 14, Bennett issued a public statement, in which she hoped her husband "will not be blamed too much" for wounding her agent. She added her husband's arrest came from his financial difficulties from the films he was involved with and said he was on the verge of a nervous breakdown. The same day, Wanger, free on bond, was ordered to appear for arraignment the next week at the Superior Court in Santa Monica.

On the evidence of seven witnesses and only five minutes of deliberation, Wanger was indicted on December 19, 1951, for assault with intent to commit murder. If found guilty, the charge carried a potential prison sentence of five to fourteen years. His defense, led by attorney Jerry Giesler, entered a plea of not guilty by reason of "temporary insanity", stating Wanger was aroused with jealousy over the suspected affair which triggered a momentary lapse in rationality. Judge Harry J. Borde of the Santa Monica Supreme Court reduced the charge to assault with a deadly weapon, and on April 22, 1952, Wanger was sentenced to four months in the Los Angeles County Jail after he waived trial and threw himself at the mercy of the court.

On June 6, 1952, Wanger began serving his four-month sentence in the Castaic Honor Farm in northern Los Angeles. At his request, Wanger worked as a prison librarian. He told reporters, whom he invited: "It's been a revelation. It's nothing like I thought it would be. The men in my tank certainly are a more polite and interesting group than any I've met at some Hollywood parties." Wanger was released early on September 12, 1952, having served 98 days in prison. In 2021, Wanger's scandal was chronicled in a podcast titled Love Is a Crime, hosted by Vanessa Hope (the granddaughter of Wanger and Bennett) and Karina Longworth.

=== 1952–1958: Career comeback ===
Affected by his prison experience, Wanger stated the U.S. prison system was "the nation's number one scandal" and vowed to produce a film about it. Meanwhile, Walter Mirisch of Allied Artists placed Wanger's name as a producer for the war film Battle Zone (1952) followed by two Westerns Kansas Pacific (1953) and Fort Vengeance (1953). Each of the films was shot in two weeks for $200,000 and were produced without Wanger's supervision. This allowed Wanger to receive a producer's billing, salary and profit participation. Wanger was compensated nearly $86,000. Mirisch reflected: "It was something we did for a friend in trouble."

Wanger's first major post-scandal project was Riot in Cell Block 11 (1954), a low-budget Allied Artists release directed by Don Siegel. Wanger hired screenwriter Richard Collins, who modeled his script on the widely reported 1952 prison riot in Jackson, Michigan where 2,600 inmates took nine prison guards hostage, which resulted in $2.5 million in damages. Filmed on location at Folsom State Prison, the film starred Neville Brand and Leo Gordon as two convict leaders who negotiate with prison authorities during a stand-off. Actual convicts during the production were featured as extras.

Released in February 1954, Riot in Cell Block 11 received critical acclaim, earning Wanger the best reviews in years. A. H. Weiler of The New York Times wrote, "Although it is explosive enough to satisfy the most rabid of the "cons versus 'screws'" school of moviegoer, it also makes a sincere and adult plea for a captive male society revolting against penal injustices. In its own small way, Riot in Cell Block 11 is a realistic and effective combination of brawn, brains and heart." The film earned $1.5 million at the box office and returned nearly $300,000 in profit.

Under a new three-picture contract with Allied Artists, Wanger decided to adapt Jack Finney's 1955 science fiction horror novel The Body Snatchers. He had read the serialization published in Collier's weekly magazine, which ran in November to December 1954. While Siegel agreed to direct, Collins was unavailable and Wanger instead hired screenwriter Daniel Mainwaring.

Initially, Wanger considered Gig Young, Dick Powell, and Joseph Cotten among others for the role of Miles. For Becky, he considered casting Anne Bancroft, Donna Reed, Kim Hunter, and Vera Miles among other actresses. Due to budget constraints, however, he abandoned these choices and offered the part to Richard Kiley, who had just starred in The Phenix City Story (1955) for Allied Artists. Kiley declined the role and Wanger cast Kevin McCarthy, an Academy Award nominee five years earlier for Death of a Salesman (1951). Relative newcomer Dana Wynter, who had done several major dramatic roles on television, was cast as Becky.

Wanger and Siegel had intended to shoot the film on location in Mill Valley, California, north of San Francisco. However, location shooting proved to be too expensive. Siegel and other Allied Artists studio executives chose instead to film in Sierra Madre, Glendale, the Chatsworth and Loz Feliz neighborhood districts, and the Bronson and Beachwood Canyons. To satisfy Allied Artists' budget preferences, Wanger proposed a budget of $350,000 and a shooting schedule of 20 days. Principal photography began on March 23, 1955 and wrapped on April 18, with the production crew working six days a week. Ultimately, the production went over schedule by three days due to Siegel's preference for night-for-night shooting. The special effects for the space pods were created from rubber, at a low-cost of $3,000.

Initially titled The Body Snatchers, Wanger wanted to avoid confusion with the 1945 Val Lewton film The Body Snatcher. Unable to come up with his own, he accepted Allied Artists' proposed title They Come from Another World by the summer of 1955. Siegel objected to this title, and he and Wanger suggested alternative titles. On November 23, 1955, Allied Artists settled on Invasion of the Body Snatchers. After a sneak preview in June 1955, Wanger proposed a prologue, as he previously did with Eagle Squadron and Riot in Cell Block 11. When Wanger was unable to secure the services of Edward R. Murrow or Orson Welles, Mainwaring scripted a framing device, both filmed by Siegel in September 1955.

Released on a double bill with The Atomic Man (1955), Invasion of the Body Snatchers was largely ignored by mainstream film critics during its initial run. The film has since grown into a cult classic when it was first syndicated for television in 1959. A month after the film's premiere in February 1956, Wanger suffered a heart attack while he was at the Cedars of Lebanon Hospital for observation.

Afterwards, Wanger declined to renew his contract with Allied Artists and instead signed a six-picture, three-year contract with RKO Radio Pictures, then headed by veteran producer William Dozier. Earlier, in 1955, Dozier announced an ambitious release schedule to distribute 12 to 15 films within the next year. There, Wanger intended to produce Underworld U.S.A. (1961) and an adaptation of W. R. Burnett's 1957 crime novel Underdog. Due to Wanger's heart attack, Dozier reassigned Underworld U.S.A. to Samuel Fuller. When Wanger eventually recovered, RKO effectively shuttered its operations by February 1957, and its studio facilities was acquired by Desilu Productions, owned by Desi Arnaz and Lucille Ball.

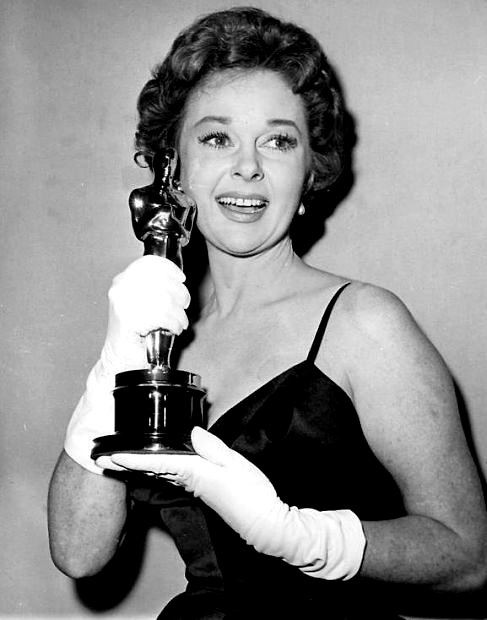
Hayward received an Oscar for her portrayal of Barbara Graham. In her acceptance speech, she thanked Wanger.

In September 1956, Wanger joined Joseph L. Mankiewicz's independent production company, Figaro, Inc. There, Wanger pitched numerous film projects, but most of these were turned down. After six months of no progress, by April 1957, Wanger proceeded with a star vehicle for Susan Hayward. Earlier, in Thanksgiving 1956, Wanger met Edward S. Montgomery, a San Francisco Examiner journalist who had won a 1951 Pulitzer Prize for Local Reporting for his exposé on tax fraud. At the time, Montgomery was revising a book of the most interesting criminal cases he had covered. After reading it, Wanger decided to adapt the real-life account of Barbara Graham's criminal history and lethal execution in 1955. Wanger hired Mankiewicz's nephew Don Mankiewicz to write the script, and by December 1957, he hired Robert Wise to direct.

Before principal photography began on I Want to Live! (1958), in February 1958, Wanger suffered a second heart attack, though not as severe as his previous one in 1956. The film received a "C" rating from the Legion of Decency and condemnations from the Los Angeles Police Department (LAPD). William H. Parker, then-LAPD chief, stated, "This movie has an unjustified premise that an innocent woman was driven to her death. In reality, chances are we would never have had a murder on our hands if it wasn't for Barbara Graham. Her accomplices went to the Monahan home in search of a cache of money they erroneously thought the elderly widow had in her house. It was Barbara who pistol-whipped and strangled the poor woman to death."

Nevertheless, Hayward received universal acclaim for her performance, as the film's anti-capital punishment stance. It was a commercial success, earning over $5.6 million with a net profit of nearly $2.5 million. At the 31st Academy Awards, Hayward won an Academy Award for Best Actress for her role in the film. In her acceptance speech, she thanked Wanger.

=== 1958–1963: Cleopatra ===
In 1958, Wanger tried to convince Figaro, Inc. to adapt Carlo Maria Franzero's The Life and Times of Cleopatra into a $5 million film starring Cary Grant as Julius Caesar, Burt Lancaster as Marc Antony, and either Sophia Loren or Audrey Hepburn as Cleopatra. When Figaro declined, Wanger pitched the project to Twentieth Century-Fox. On September 30, Wanger held his first meeting about Cleopatra with Spyros Skouras, then the president of Twentieth Century Fox. A month later, in October, Wanger signed a two-year producer deal with Twentieth Century Fox.

Aside from Cleopatra, Wanger also optioned three other properties: Lawrence Durrell's novel Justine, Elaine Dundy's The Dud Avocado, and Albert Camus's The Fall. By May 1960, Joseph L. Mankiewicz was hired to write and direct Justine with Ava Gardner and David Niven. By December 1959, The Dud Avocado was shelved.

In October 1958, Wanger envisioned Cleopatra as an opulent epic with a voluptuous actress as Cleopatra. Buddy Adler, the head of production for Fox, and Skouras preferred a cheaper epic with one of their contract actresses such as Joan Collins, Joanne Woodward, or Suzy Parker. To illustrate his desired visual scale, Wanger hired art director John DeCuir, and later Oliver Messel to design the costumes. Elizabeth Taylor—Wanger's first choice—was contacted by him several times in London while filming Suddenly, Last Summer (1959). In September 1959, she was cast as Cleopatra when the studio met her demand for a $1 million salary. A month later, Rouben Mamoulian was hired as director. Meanwhile, the script underwent numerous revisions from several writers, including Ludi Claire, Nigel Balchin, Dale Wasserman, and Lawrence Durrell.

Principal photography began on September 15, 1960, at Pinewood Studios in London. However, Taylor contracted a cold, which forced Mamoulian to film certain scenes around her. On the same day, the British hairdressers' union threatened to leave production, as Taylor had brought Sydney Guilaroff, an American hairstylist. Taylor's cold progressed into meningitis, which cost the studio $2 million to cover her medical expenses. On November 18, with nothing left to film without Taylor, Wanger indefinitely postponed production until her health recovered.

In January 1961, before shooting resumed, Taylor and Mamoulian were displeased with the new script by Nunnally Johnson. At Taylor's suggestion, Wanger sent a copy of the script to Paddy Chayefsky, who estimated it would take six months to rewrite. Mamoulian resigned as director, shortly thereafter. Joseph L. Mankiewicz was hired, and within a month, he conceived a "modern, psychiatrically rooted concept of the film." To help Mankiewicz finish the script, Durrell, Sidney Buchman, and later Ranald MacDougall were hired. During this time, Taylor was diagnosed with pneumonia but recovered following a tracheotomy. Meanwhile, Twentieth Century-Fox dismantled the Pinewood sets, and the production was moved to Cinecittà in Rome. Taylor's co-stars were recast with Richard Burton and Rex Harrison.

At Skouras and new production head Peter Levathes' insistence, principal photography on Cleopatra began on September 25, 1961 without a completed shooting script. Mankiewicz therefore directed scenes during the day and wrote the script longhand by night. By October 1961, as the weather conditions postponed the filming of Cleopatra's procession into Rome, Wanger faced pressure from Levathes and Sid Rogell to reduce cost overruns and have more control over Mankiewicz. Regardless, Wanger declined to pull rank with Mankiewicz.

On January 22, 1962, Taylor and Burton filmed their first scene together. Wanger observed in his journal: "There comes a time during the making of a movie when the actors become the characters they play... It was quiet, and you could almost feel the electricity between Liz and Burton." Four days later, Mankiewicz told Wanger in his hotel room: "I have been sitting on a volcano all alone for too long, and I want to give you some facts you ought to know. Liz and Burton are not just playing Antony and Cleopatra." When the extramarital scandal became known, Skouras and several studio executives blamed Wanger for failing to discipline Taylor and Burton, and the subsequent production delays it caused.

By early June 1962, with Skouras's approval, Levathes, Otto Koegel and Joseph Moskowitz, whom Wanger jokingly named as the "Three Wise Men," were dispatched to Rome to deliver three directives. Inside the Grand Hotel Palace Rome, the committee met with Wanger, Mankiewicz, and Sid Rogell to demand that Taylor's salary be terminated on June 9, informally fire Wanger by discontinuing his salary and expense account, and that all filming be halted by June 30. Earl Wilson, a syndicated newspaper columnist, was the first to report Wanger's dismissal, in which Wanger suspected Fox executive Robert Goldstein of leaking the news. Mankiewicz read Wilson's column and asked Lewis "Doc" Merman, the studio's production manager, if he could assume Wanger's position and thereby reinstate the filming of several sequences, including the Battle of Pharsalus, that were cut.

Taylor and Burton, angered over Wanger's dismissal, had planned to protest unless Wanger was reinstated. Back in Los Angeles, Merman consulted with Levathes, in which they both agreed that Wanger would remain as producer. Samuel Rosenman, then the studio chairman, permitted for Taylor's availability to be extended until June 23. Principal photography for Cleopatra wrapped a month afterwards on July 28, 1962.

During the film's post-production, Wanger advised Mankiewicz on his five-hour rough cut of the cut, supervised the dubbing and recording of Alex North's score, and wrote a lengthy statement in support of Mankiewicz's sole screenwriting credit for the film. However, he was shut out during Mankiewicz's public feud with Darryl F. Zanuck, who had returned as studio president for Twentieth Century-Fox, over the film's final cut. Zanuck wrote a letter to Wanger, offering him to screen the film in Paris but the studio would not compensate the expenses. Furthermore, Wanger had heard internal studio reports that he had been derelict during production, which would impugn his reputation as a film producer.

To protect his reputation, Wanger co-authored the memoir My Life with Cleopatra with Joe Hyams, detailing his involvement throughout the production of Cleopatra. In early June 1963, Wanger filed a $2.6 million lawsuit for breach of contract against Twentieth-Century-Fox, Zanuck, Skouras, and Earl Wilson, in which he sought monetary compensation and filed an injunction to restrain the studio from releasing Cleopatra without first giving him an opportunity to view it and judge its quality. Skouras countersued Wanger for libel he found in Wanger's book. By October 1965, Wanger's attorneys reached a settlement with Fox for $100,000, and Wanger issued a public apology to Skouras. As part of his settlement, Wanger surrendered his rights to produce Justine. Zanuck handed the project to Pandro S. Berman, who then hired George Cukor to direct a 1969 film adaptation.

On June 11, 1963, Cleopatra premiered at the Rivoli Theatre, with Wanger present with his daughters Shelley and Stephanie. However, he was not allowed entrance on the red carpet and instead stood on the sidelines with a crowd of ten thousand onlookers. Despite mixed reviews, Cleopatra became the highest-grossing film of 1963, generating $26 million in distributor rentals. However, the film held a negative cost of $44 million and did not break even until Fox sold the television broadcasting rights to ABC in September 1966. At the 37th Academy Awards, among nine nominations, Cleopatra was nominated for Best Picture and won four.

=== 1964–1968: Later career ===
In October 1964, it was reported that Wanger had signed with MGM to produce two films: Night of the Short Knives, based on the novel by Burke Wilkinson, and the novel The Rector of Justin by Louis Auchincloss. Wanger and producer Gabriel Katzka interested Gregory Peck in starring in The Night of the Short Knives and hired screenwriters Ring Lardner Jr. and Ian McLellan Hunter to develop a script. By 1966, MGM cancelled the project and Wanger failed to sell the project to other studios.

In May 1966, Wanger received the Commendation of the Order of Merit, Italy's third-highest honor, from Consul General Alvaro v. Bettrani, "for your friendship and cooperation with the Italian government in all phases of the motion picture industry."

In 1968, Wanger acquired the film rights to John H. Reese's novel The Looters, about small-time burglars who rob a bank with Mafia connections. Preoccupied with Coogan's Bluff (1968), Don Siegel declined to direct and instead recommended Peter Bogdanovich, who wrote the script. However, it was shelved after Wanger's death and was later revived as Charley Varrick (1973).

== Personal life and death ==
Wanger married silent film actress Justine Johnstone in 1919. They divorced in 1938, and in 1940, he married actress Joan Bennett. They had two daughters, Stephanie (born 1943) and Shelley Antonia (born 1948). Wanger adopted Bennett's daughter, Diana, by her marriage to John Fox. In September 1965, Bennett and Wanger divorced on grounds of incompatibility, after 25 years of marriage, in Juárez, Mexico.

On November 18, 1968, Wanger died of a heart attack, aged 74, in New York City. His estate was worth $18,000 at the time of death, which he left to his daughter Shelley. He was interred in the Home of Peace Cemetery in Colma, California.

== Partial filmography ==
- The Sheik (1921)
- The Cocoanuts (1929)
- The Lady Lies (1929)
- Roadhouse Nights (1930)
- Tarnished Lady (1931)
- Washington Merry-Go-Round (1932)
- Gabriel Over the White House (1933)
- The Bitter Tea of General Yen (1933)
- Going Hollywood (1933)
- Queen Christina (1933)
- The President Vanishes (1934)
- Private Worlds (1935)
- Every Night at Eight (1935)
- Shanghai (1935)
- Palm Springs (1936)
- The Trail of the Lonesome Pine (1936)
- History Is Made at Night (1937)
- Stand-In (1937)
- 52nd Street (1937)
- You Only Live Once (1937)
- Blockade (1938)
- Trade Winds (1938)
- I Met My Love Again (1938)
- Stagecoach (1939)
- Eternally Yours (1939)
- Foreign Correspondent (1940)
- Slightly Honorable (1940)
- The Long Voyage Home (1940)
- The House Across the Bay (1940)
- Sundown (1941)
- Eagle Squadron (1942)
- Arabian Nights (1942)
- We've Never Been Licked (1943)
- Gung Ho! (1943)
- Ladies Courageous (1944)
- To the People of the United States (1944)
- Salome Where She Danced (1945)
- Scarlet Street (1945)
- Night in Paradise (1946)
- Canyon Passage (1946)
- Smash-Up, the Story of a Woman (1947)
- The Lost Moment (1947)
- Secret Beyond the Door (1947)
- Tap Roots (1948)
- Joan of Arc (1948)
- Tulsa (1949)
- Reign of Terror (aka The Black Book) (1949)
- The Reckless Moment (1949)
- Lady in the Iron Mask (1952)
- Battle Zone (1952)
- Kansas Pacific (1953)
- Fort Vengeance (1953)
- Riot in Cell Block 11 (1954)
- The Adventures of Hajji Baba (1954)
- Invasion of the Body Snatchers (1956)
- Navy Wife (1956)
- I Want to Live! (1958)
- Cleopatra (1963)

== Bibliography ==
- Balio, Tino (1976). United Artists, Volume 1, 1919–1950: The Company Built by the Stars. University of Wisconsin Press. ISBN 978-0-299-23003-6.
- Bernstein, Matthew (2000) [1994]. Walter Wanger, Hollywood Independent. University of Minnesota Press. ISBN 978-0-816-63548-1.
- Capra, Frank (1971). Frank Capra, The Name Above the Title: An Autobiography. Macmillan Company. ISBN 0-306-80771-8.
- Dumont, Hervé (2006). Frank Borzage: The Life and Films of a Hollywood Romantic. Jefferson, North Caroline: McFarland & Company. ISBN 978-0-786-42187-9.
- Eyman, Scott (1999). Print the Legend: The Life and Times of John Ford. New York: Simon & Schuster. ISBN 978-0-684-81161-1.
- Geist, Kenneth L. (1978). Pictures Will Talk: The Life and Films of Joseph L. Mankiewicz. New York: Scribners. ISBN 978-0-684-15500-5.
- Gabler, Neal (1988). An Empire of Their Own: How the Jews Invented Hollywood. New York: Crown. ISBN 978-0-385-26557-7.
- Holden, Anthony (1993). Behind the Oscar: The Secret History of the Academy Awards. New York: Simon & Schuster. ISBN 978-0-671-70129-1.
- Kamp, David (April 1998). "When Liz Met Dick". Vanity Fair. pp. 366–393.
- LaValley, Al, ed. (1989). Invasion of the Body Snatchers: Don Siegel, director. New Brunswick, New Jersey: Rutgers University Press. ISBN 978-0-81351-461-1.
- Luperi, Kim; Reid, Danny (2025). Pre-Code Essentials: Must-See Cinema from Hollywood's Untamed Era, 1930–1934. New York: Running Press. ISBN 979-8-894-14057-5.
- Milne, Tom (1970). Rouben Mamoulian. Bloomington: Indiana University Press. ISBN 978-0-253-15015-8.
- McGilligan, Patrick (1997). Fritz Lang: The Nature of the Beast. New York: St. Martin's Press. ISBN 978-0-321-13247-5.
- McGilligan, Patrick (2003). Alfred Hitchcock: A Life in Darkness and Light. New York: Regan Books. ISBN 978-0-06-039322-9.
- Mirisch, Walter (2008). I Thought We Were Making Movies, Not History. University of Wisconsin Press. ISBN 978-0-299-22640-4.
- Schatz, Thomas (1996) [1989]. The Genius of the System: Hollywood Filmmaking in the Studio Era. New York: Henry Holt and Company. ISBN 978-0-39453-979-9.
- Silverman, Stephen M. (1988). The Fox That Got Away: The Last Days of the Zanuck Dynasty at Twentieth Century-Fox. L. Stuart. ISBN 978-0-818-40485-6.
- Spoto, Donald (1983). The Dark Side of Genius: The Life of Alfred Hitchcock. New York: Da Capo Press. ISBN 978-0-306-80932-3.
- Stern, Sydney Ladensohn (2019). The Brothers Mankiewicz: Hope, Heartbreak, and Hollywood Classics. University Press of Mississippi. ISBN 978-1-617-03267-7.
- Thomas, Bob (1990). King Cohn: The Life and Times of Hollywood Mogul Harry Cohn. McGraw-Hill. ISBN 978-0-070-64261-4.
- Wanger, Walter; Hyams, Joe (2013) [1963]. My Life with Cleopatra: The Making of a Hollywood Classic. New York: Vintage Books. ISBN 978-0-345-80405-1.

Non-profit organization positions
Preceded by Frank Capra	President of Academy of Motion Pictures, Arts and Sciences; 1939–1941	Succeeded by Bette Davis
Preceded by Bette Davis	President of Academy of Motion Pictures, Arts and Sciences; 1941–1945	Succeeded by Jean Hersholt
Other offices
Preceded by Bob Hope; 12th Academy Awards	Oscars host 13th Academy Awards	Succeeded by Bob Hope; 14th Academy Awards
