= Bob Dylan North America Tour 1965 =

Concert tour

- Tour by Bob Dylan
- Location: North America
- Associated album: Highway 61 Revisited
- Start date: September 24, 1965
- End date: December 19, 1965

Bob Dylan concert chronology
- Tour of England (1965); North America Tour (1965); World Tour 1966 (1966)

The Bob Dylan North America Tour 1965 was a concert tour by American singer-songwriter Bob Dylan during the autumn of 1965. The tour was Dylan's first with a rock band, the Hawks, most of whom would later follow Dylan to Woodstock in 1967 and become The Band while helping Dylan record what become known as The Basement Tapes. Except for two shows at Massey Hall in Toronto, all concerts took place in the United States, with all the December dates taking place in California.

== Background ==
In May, Dylan returned to New York City from his short tour of England. A month later, he entered the studio of Columbia Records to record his next single, "Like a Rolling Stone," with session players including Mike Bloomfield of the Butterfield Blues Band and Al Kooper. Both Kooper and Bloomfield, along with Barry Goldberg and the rhythm section from the Butterfield band of Jerome Arnold and Sam Lay, would support Dylan when he went electric at the 1965 Newport Folk Festival on July 24, four days after the release of the single. At that concert, Dylan would configure his backing band of second guitar, two keyboards, bass, and drums, that would be his accompaniment for this tour.

Bloomfield and Kooper would also participate in sessions for the subsequent album, Highway 61 Revisited, recorded in late July and early August and released at the end of that month. Only two additional concerts would be played in between Newport and this tour, one at Forest Hills Stadium in Queens on August 28 and one a week later at the Hollywood Bowl on September 3. The Butterfield band had its own commitments, Dylan retaining Kooper along with session bassist Harvey Brooks for these shows and adding two members of the Hawks, Levon Helm and Robbie Robertson. When Brooks and Kooper declined to participate in the fall tour, Helm and Robertson convinced Bob to hire the rest of their band, keyboardists Garth Hudson and Richard Manuel along with bassist Rick Danko. Helm would quit before the group went to California, his place taken by session drummer Bobby Gregg who had played on the Highway 61 sessions.

== Tour dates ==
Date	City	Country	Venue
September 24, 1965	Austin	United States	Palmer Municipal Auditorium
September 25, 1965	Dallas	United States	Moody Coliseum
October 1, 1965	New York City	United States	Carnegie Hall
October 2, 1965	Newark	United States	Mosque Theater
October 9, 1965	Atlanta	United States	Municipal Auditorium
October 16, 1965	Worcester	United States	Memorial Auditorium
October 22, 1965	Providence	United States	Rhode Island Auditorium
October 23, 1965	Burlington	United States	Patrick Gymnasium
October 24, 1965	Detroit	United States	Cobo Arena
October 29, 1965	Boston	United States	Back Bay Theatre
October 30, 1965	Hartford	United States	Bushnell Memorial Hall
October 31, 1965	Boston	United States	Back Bay Theatre
November 5, 1965	Minneapolis	United States	Minneapolis Auditorium
November 6, 1965	Buffalo	United States	Kleinhans Music Hall
November 7, 1965	Yellow Springs	United States	Antioch College
November 12, 1965	Cleveland	United States	Music Hall
November 14, 1965	Toronto	Canada	Massey Hall
November 15, 1965	Toronto	Canada	Massey Hall
November 18, 1965	Cincinnati	United States	Cincinnati Music Hall
November 19, 1965	Columbus	United States	Memorial Hall
November 20, 1965	Rochester	United States	Rochester Community War Memorial
November 21, 1965	Syracuse	United States	War Memorial
November 26, 1965	Chicago	United States	Arie Crown Theater
November 27, 1965	Chicago	United States	Arie Crown Theater
November 28, 1965	Washington, DC	United States	Washington Coliseum
December 3, 1965	Berkeley	United States	Berkeley Community Theater
December 4, 1965	Berkeley	United States	Berkeley Community Theater
December 5, 1965	San Francisco	United States	Grand Masonic Auditorium
December 7, 1965	Long Beach	United States	Municipal Auditorium
December 8, 1965	Santa Monica	United States	Santa Monica Civic Auditorium
December 9, 1965	Pasadena	United States	Pasadena Civic Auditorium
December 10, 1965	San Diego	United States	Community Concourse Theater
December 11, 1965	San Francisco	United States	Grand Masonic Auditorium
December 12, 1965	San Jose	United States	Civic Auditorium
December 18, 1965	Pasadena	United States	Pasadena Civic Auditorium
December 19, 1965	Santa Monica	United States	Santa Monica Civic Auditorium

== Set lists ==
The first half of the concert would feature the familiar Dylan, alone with his guitar and harmonica. After an intermission, the second half would be Dylan with his rock band backing. By all accounts, there were no opening acts.

Acoustic half

1. "She Belongs to Me"
2. "To Ramona"
3. "Gates of Eden"
4. "Love Minus Zero/No Limit"
5. "Desolation Row"
6. "It's All Over Now, Baby Blue"
7. "Mr. Tambourine Man"

Electric Half

1. "Tombstone Blues"
2. "I Don't Believe You (She Acts Like We Never Have Met)"
3. "Baby, Let Me Follow You Down"
4. "Just Like Tom Thumb's Blues"
5. "Maggie's Farm"
6. "It Ain't Me Babe"
7. "Ballad of a Thin Man"
8. "Positively 4th Street"
9. "Like a Rolling Stone"

== Tour personnel ==
- Bob Dylan — vocal, guitars, harmonica, piano
- Robbie Robertson — electric guitar
- Richard Manuel — piano
- Garth Hudson — organ
- Rick Danko — bass
- Levon Helm — drums through the end of November
- Bobby Gregg — drums dates in December
