= Stand-In =

1937 American film directed by Tay Garnett

- Theatrical release poster
- Directed by: Tay Garnett; Charles Kerr (assistant)
- Written by: Clarence Budington Kelland (story); Gene Towne; C. Graham Baker
- Produced by: Walter Wanger (uncredited)
- Starring: Leslie Howard; Joan Blondell; Humphrey Bogart
- Production company: Walter Wanger Productions
- Distributed by: United Artists
- Release date: October 29, 1937
- Running time: 91 minutes
- Country: United States
- Language: English
- Budget: $523,869
- Box office: $617,521

Stand-In is a 1937 American screwball comedy directed by Tay Garnett and starring Leslie Howard, Joan Blondell and Humphrey Bogart. The film's screenplay was written by Gene Towne and C. Graham Baker from a story by Clarence Budington Kelland. It was produced by independent producer Walter Wanger, and released by United Artists. The film is set in Hollywood and satirizes the film industry during the classical Hollywood era.

== Plot ==
During the Great Depression, Fowler Pettypacker, a Wall Street banker, is debating whether or not to accept an offer from Ivor Nassau to buy "Colossal Pictures," a fictional film studio on Poverty Row. The studio has not been turning a profit, but financial analyst Atterbury Dodd advises against selling. He stakes his reputation on his mathematical calculations that show Colossal should turn a profit. The bank sends Dodd to Hollywood as the new head of the studio.

Colossal's star actress, Thelma Cheri, eccentric foreign director Koslofski, and press agent Tom Potts are conspiring with Nassau to sabotage the studio. They are deliberately running up costs on producer Douglas Quintain's jungle feature, Sex and Satan, so that the film flops and the studio goes bankrupt.

In Hollywood, Dodd meets Lester Plum, a cheerful former child star currently working as a stand-in for Cheri. Lester teaches Dodd about the business of filmmaking and eventually becomes his secretary. Under Lester's tutelage, Dodd comes to see that the workers are more than just numbers. Lester falls in love with Dodd, but he is initially oblivious to her feelings.

When Dodd is unimpressed by a viewing of Sex and Satan, Koslofski puts the blame squarely on Quintain. Quintain had discovered Cheri and made her a star, falling in love with her in the process, but she sides with Koslofski. As a result, Dodd fires Quintain. After an audience preview confirms that the film is awful (they prefer the ape over Cheri's performance), Dodd seeks out the heartbroken producer. Once he sobers up from his drunken binge, Quintain comes up with the idea to salvage the film by cutting down Cheri's part and expanding the ape's. However, before they can do so, Pettypacker telephones Dodd, informing him that he has sold the studio to Nassau, and that Dodd is fired. Dodd convinces the initially hostile workers into rallying behind him to finish the film. Then, he asks Plum to marry him.

== Cast ==
- Leslie Howard as Atterbury Dodd
- Joan Blondell as Lester Plum
- Humphrey Bogart as Doug Quintain
- Alan Mowbray as Koslofski
- Marla Shelton as Thelma Cheri
- C. Henry Gordon as Ivor Nassau
- Jack Carson as Tom Potts
- Tully Marshall as Fowler Pettypacker
- J. C. Nugent as Junior Pettypacker
- William V. Mong as Cyrus Pettypacker

== Themes and interpretations ==
Despite acknowledging director Tay Garnett, screenwriters Graham Baker and Gene Towne, and producer Walter Wanger as not being known for having leftist leanings, author Matthew Kennedy wrote that the film's "respect for the little people of Hollywood [is] reflected in its anti-capitalist, leftist ideology as rendered by original story writer Clarence Budington Kelland, the man who was also behind the 1936 populist classic Mr. Deeds Goes to Town." Kennedy adds that Dodd, "a pawn for the bankers", has to stop "treating labor as 'cogs' or 'units'" in order to win the affection of Plum. Kennedy also refers to a scene in which a group of below-the-line crew members throw Nassau over the studio walls as an allegory for revolution, and concludes that, "it is the stand-in, not the star, who ultimately gets the man. At the final fade, however, Lester Plum is still a nameless face in the machinery."

== Production ==
Stand-In is based on the story Kelland, Clarence Budington (February 13, 1937). "Stand-In". The Saturday Evening Post..

PCA Director Joseph Breen found the story submitted to the PCA in Mar 1937 "unacceptable" because of the portrayal of "Thelma Cheri" as a "loose woman" and that of other characters as being involved in "illicit sex relations." Breen also commented, "The specific and general treatment of the characters and situations, which reflect unfavorably upon the motion picture industry and its personnel, is objectionable from the point of view of general industry policy." Subsequently, suggestions by the PCA were accepted by Walter Wanger Productions, including changing the character of "Thelma Cheri" to that of an unmarried woman; deleting a speech about the stifling of competition in the industry and the crushing of independent companies by the majors; and deleting a speech by Atterbury at the end, in which he says he is going to start a Senate investigation of the motion picture business.

Joan Blondell, after working on the 1937 film The Perfect Specimen for Warner Bros. Pictures, was cast in Stand-In (a Walter Wanger Productions, Inc. production and a United Artists release) as part of a "studio talent swap." She reportedly enjoyed the working environment of Stand-In. Blondell had previously worked with Bogart on the 1932 film Three on a Match and the 1936 film Bullets or Ballots, and stated of him, "He wasn't a man one ever felt close to—nobody did. But I liked him." Shortly after production on Stand-In wrapped, Blondell was hospitalized for neuritis and exhaustion.

In Garnett's autobiography, he relates that after Bogart's wife, Mayo Methot, complained that Bogart was only getting "heavy" parts, Garnett convinced Walter Wanger to use Bogart in this role, hoping that it would lead to romantic leads for him.

Bogart was loaned from Warner Bros. Pictures.

== Reception ==
The film recorded a profit of $9,274.

A reviewer for Life called the film "a pretty good one", and praised Howard's role as Dodd as "a comic part like nothing he has ever done before," and "one of his most engaging performances."
