= She Couldn't Take It =

1935 film by Tay Garnett

- Directed by: Tay Garnett
- Written by: Oliver H.P. Garrett
- Based on: story by C. Graham Baker; Gene Towne
- Produced by: B. P. Schulberg
- Starring: George Raft; Joan Bennett; Walter Connolly; Billie Burke; Lloyd Nolan; Wallace Ford
- Cinematography: Leon Shamroy
- Edited by: Gene Havlick
- Music by: Howard Jackson; Louis Silvers
- Production company: Columbia Pictures
- Distributed by: Columbia Pictures
- Release date: October 8, 1935
- Running time: 77 minutes
- Country: United States
- Language: English

She Couldn't Take It is a 1935 American screwball comedy film made at Columbia Pictures, directed by Tay Garnett, written by C. Graham Baker, Gene Towne and Oliver H.P. Garrett, and starring George Raft and Joan Bennett. It was one of the few comedies Raft made in his career.

== Plot ==
The film tells the story of the wealthy family Van Dyke: a frustrated patriarch Dan (Walter Connolly); his self-centered wife (Billie Burke); and his spoiled children Tony (James Blakeley) and Carol (Joan Bennett). They have constant run-ins for outrageous behavior.

Dan Van Dyke is sent to prison for tax evasion. His cellmate is bootlegger and fellow convicted tax evader Ricardi. The two men become friends and when Van Dyke dies from a poor heart, he puts Ricardi in charge of his interests.

== Cast ==
- George Raft as Ricardi
- Joan Bennett as Carol Van Dyke
- Walter Connolly as Mr. Van Dyke
- Billie Burke as Mrs. Van Dyke
- Lloyd Nolan as Tex
- Wallace Ford as Finger Boston
- Alan Mowbray as Alan Hamlin
- Donald Meek as Uncle Wyndersham
- James Blakely as Tony Van Dyke
- William Tannen as Cesar
- Donald Meek as Uncle Wyndersham
- Frank Rice as Milkman
- Frank Conroy as Raleigh

== Production ==
The film is based on a story by writers C. Graham Baker and Gene Towne, with the screenplay by Oliver H.P. Garrett.

Raft was loaned to Columbia by Paramount Pictures to make the film. Writers Baker and Towne and actress Joan Bennett were under contract to Walter Wanger, and Wanger had an agreement to distribute his films through Paramount. Bennett was thus considered on loan-out as well. Walter Byron was originally cast as Alec Hamlin, but was replaced by Alan Mowbray two weeks into filming. Donald Meek and James Blakely were added to cast the third week of August. Wallace Ford replaced Raymond Walburn a day later.

The film was originally known as Rich Man's Daughter, but was changed to She Couldn't Take It about August 22, 1935. It was B.P. Schulberg's first film in a six-picture deal he had with Columbia Pictures. Columbia Pictures, with little space at its Gower Street studios, leased California Studios, a single-soundstage motion picture production facility a block east of Gower Street just a few days before shooting on She Couldn't Take It began on July 16, 1935. The film was the first Columbia feature shot at California Studios. Columbia's chief costume and fashion designer, Robert Kalloch, designed Bennett's wardrobe. Previously known for her demure and conservative appearance, Kalloch's gowns permanently transformed the actress into the epitome of chic.

George Raft, Joan Bennett, Billie Burke, and Walter Connolly did an abbreviated version of the film's plot on Dick Powell's "Hollywood Hotel" radio program in late August 1935 to promote the film.

== Reception ==
The New York Times said the film "has a clinical interest as an example of the confused resentment against the idle rich which Hollywood has been displaying lately" in which the opening scenes "offer considerable promise for a bright-faced comedy of society foibles" but which went downhill once Walter Connolly's character died.

The Los Angeles Times called it "George Raft's best picture" with an "inventive scenario" and "unexpected twists".

After making the film, Tay Garnett went on an around the world cruise.

== Bibliography ==
- Bernstein, Matthew (1994). Walter Wanger, Hollywood Independent. Berkeley, California: University of California Press. ISBN 9780520081277.
- Parish, James Robert; Whitney, Steven (1973). The George Raft File: The Unauthorized Biography. New York: Drake Publishers. ISBN 9780877495208.
- Stephens, E.J.; Wanamaker, Marc (2014). Early Poverty Row Studios. Charleston, South Carolina: Arcadia Publishing. ISBN 9781467132589.
