= Loew's State Theater =

Loew's State Theater (or Theatre) can refer to any of various movie palaces at one time owned by Loew's, including:

- State Theatre (Los Angeles), California
- Holyoke Opera House, Massachusetts, as it was known from 1945 to 1955
- Landmark Theatre (Syracuse, New York)
- Loew's State Theatre (New York City), 1540 Broadway, now the site of the Bertelsmann Building
- Providence Performing Arts Center, formerly known as the Loew's State Theater, Providence, Rhode Island
- Loew's State Theatre (Boston)

== See also ==
- Loew's Grand Theatre, Atlanta, Georgia
- Loew's Wonder Theatres
