= Call of the Prairie =

1936 film by Howard Bretherton

- Film poster
- Directed by: Howard Bretherton
- Screenplay by: Doris Schroeder; Vernon Smith
- Produced by: Harry Sherman
- Starring: William Boyd; James Ellison; Muriel Evans; George "Gabby" Hayes; Chester Conklin; Al Bridge; Willie Fung
- Cinematography: Archie Stout
- Edited by: Edward Schroeder
- Music by: Earl Sitar
- Production company: Paramount Pictures
- Distributed by: Paramount Pictures
- Release date: March 6, 1936
- Running time: 63 minutes
- Country: United States
- Language: English

Call of the Prairie is a 1936 American Western film directed by Howard Bretherton and written by Doris Schroeder and Vernon Smith. The film stars William Boyd, James Ellison, Muriel Evans, George "Gabby" Hayes, Chester Conklin, Al Bridge and Willie Fung. The film was released on March 6, 1936, by Paramount Pictures.

== Cast ==
- William Boyd as Hopalong Cassidy
- James Ellison as Johnny Nelson
- Muriel Evans as Linda McHenry
- George "Gabby" Hayes as Charlie Shanghai McHenry
- Chester Conklin as Sheriff Sandy McQueen
- Al Bridge as Sam Porter
- Willie Fung as Wong
- Howard Lang as Buck Peters
- Hank Mann as Bartender Tom
- Al Hill as Henchman Tom Slade
- James Mason as Henchman Hoskins
- John Merton as Henchman Arizona
- Chill Wills as Singing Cowhand
- Art Green as Singing Cowhand
- Walter Trask as Singing Cowhand
- Don Brookins as Singing Cowhand
