= Dartmouth Laboratory Theatre =

Dartmouth College drama club

The Dartmouth Laboratory Theatre emerged from a dramatic club at Dartmouth College. The work in the genre of a little theatre began in earnest in 1913.

== Origins ==
Wallace F. Robinson was the founder of the Little Theatre; the student Walter F. Wanger (born Feuchtwanger) was the director. Wanger went on to work with Granville Barker soon after graduating from college. He became an influential Hollywood producer.

The students sought to reach the standards of "professional finish" and to recruit theatrical talent from the student body. A contemporary critic praised their "ambitious plays rather than the usual line of classics." Previously unknown plays – be they written by Dartmouth undergraduates or others – were to be performed in the manner of a theatre laboratory, but popular fare like musical theatre was also staged. Most performances were in Robinson Hall, which had 250 seats at the time. In the first decades of the Laboratory, all the roles were played by men.

== Ticket prices in 1913 ==
"The price of seats for the entire house of fifty cents, save at prom, commencement, and carnival weeks, when $1.50 is asked."

== Notable early performances ==
- The New Sin, by MacDonald Hastings
- The Little King, by Witter Bynner
- The Man from the Sea, by Charles Goddard and Paul Dickey
- Leave of Absence, by Carl Freybe
- James and John, by Gilbert Canaan
- The Intruder, by Maeterlinck
- Catherine Parr, by Maurice Baring
- Naughty Nero, a musical
- The Workhouse Ward, by Lady Gregory. The author travelled to the campus to see the show

== Performances off-campus ==
Several one-act plays were performed at a Boston theatre.
