= Three on the Trail (film) =

1936 film by Howard Bretherton

- Directed by: Howard Bretherton
- Screenplay by: Doris Schroeder; Vernon Smith
- Produced by: Harry Sherman
- Starring: William Boyd; James Ellison; Onslow Stevens; Muriel Evans; George "Gabby" Hayes; Claude King; William Duncan
- Cinematography: Archie Stout
- Edited by: Edward Schroeder
- Music by: Charles Sargent
- Production company: Paramount Pictures
- Distributed by: Paramount Pictures
- Release date: April 24, 1936
- Running time: 67 minutes
- Country: United States
- Language: English

Three on the Trail is a 1936 American Western film directed by Howard Bretherton, written by Doris Schroeder and Vernon Smith, and starring William Boyd, James Ellison, Onslow Stevens, Muriel Evans, George "Gabby" Hayes, Claude King and William Duncan. It was released on April 24, 1936, by Paramount Pictures.

== Plot ==
An evil gang is involved in both cattle rustling and the robbing of stagecoaches. Hoppy must stop them without help from the sheriff who turns out be a major outlaw himself.

== Cast ==
- William Boyd as Hopalong Cassidy
- James Ellison as Johnny Nelson
- Onslow Stevens as Pecos Kane
- Muriel Evans as Mary Stevens
- George "Gabby" Hayes as Windy Halliday
- Claude King as J. P. Ridley
- William Duncan as Buck Peters
- Clara Kimball Young as Rose Peters
- John St. Polis as Sheriff Sam Corwin
- Ernie Adams as Idaho
- Al Hill as Kit Thorpe
- Ted Adams as Henchman Jim Trask
- Jack Rutherford as Henchman Lewis
- Lita Cortez as Conchita
