= James Ellison (actor) =

American actor

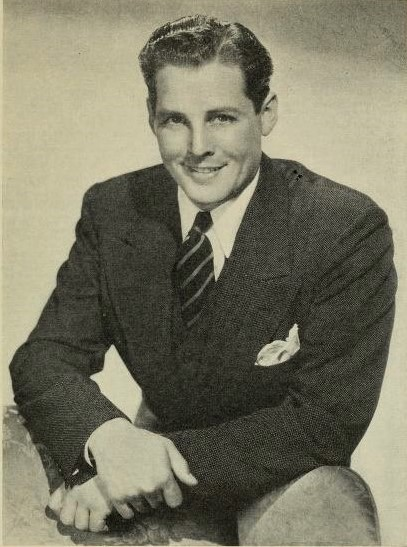
- Ellison in 1937
- Born: James Ellison Smith; May 4, 1910; Guthrie Center, Iowa, U.S.
- Died: December 23, 1993 (aged 83); Monterey, California, U.S.
- Occupation: Actor
- Years active: 1932–1962
- Spouses: Gertrude Durkin (1937-1970) (her death) (2 children); Lois Bretherton (m. 1972)

James Ellison (born James Ellison Smith; May 4, 1910 – December 23, 1993) was an American film actor who appeared in nearly 70 films from 1932 to 1962.

== Biography ==
Ellison was born in Guthrie Center, Iowa, the son of Edward James Smith and Ona Mary Ellis. He worked for a time in a film laboratory and while there was offered a screen test, after being discovered at Harold Lloyd's Beverly Hills Little Theatre for Professionals. He developed the film footage himself, and after he saw it, decided it was not satisfactory so he would not show it to the director. But the director saw it anyway and Ellison got a contract.

He spent much of his career in westerns, including a stint in the mid-1930s as Johnny Nelson, the sidekick of Hopalong Cassidy in Paramount's highly successful series. Although he was a "supporting player" in the series, his name is oddly billed the same size and format as veteran actor and matinee idol William Boyd's. Though it is not confirmed, this is believed to be because the character Johnny Nelson is very prominent in the original Hopalong Cassidy book series.

In 1936, he played his highest-profile role as Buffalo Bill in Cecil B. DeMille's The Plainsman, which also starred Gary Cooper and Jean Arthur. Although this film was a success, DeMille reportedly hated Ellison's performance and wanted to be certain the young actor never appeared in a film of equal quality again.

In 1938, he played the role of Keith Morgan in the romantic comedy Vivacious Lady, receiving third billing to Ginger Rogers and Jimmy Stewart.

The same year, he played a charming, romantic character opposite Lucille Ball in the RKO Pictures comedy Next Time I Marry. He later shared top billing with Ball in 1940's You Can't Fool Your Wife.

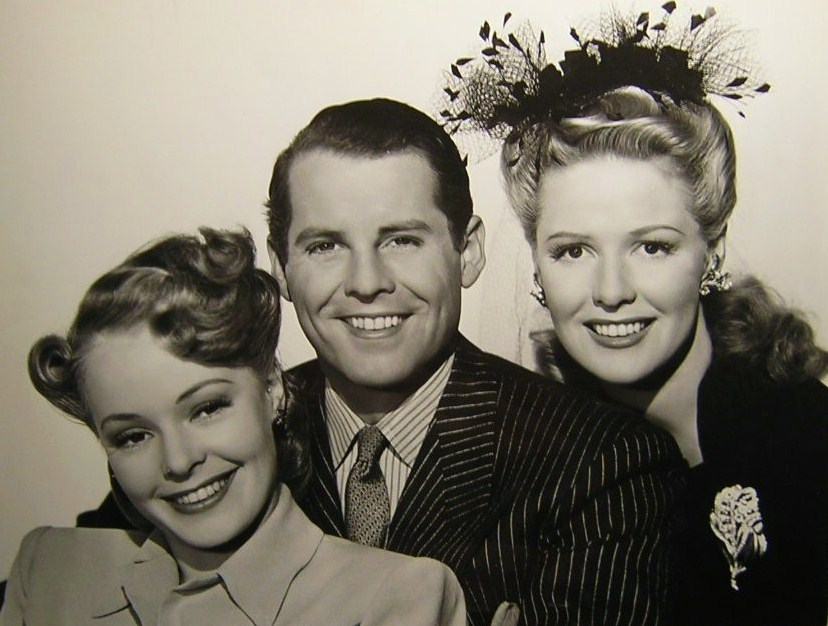
Virginia Gilmore, James Ellison and Janis Carter in the film That Other Woman (1942)

Ellison spent most of the remainder of his career shuttling between cowboy pictures and more varied roles, primarily in B movies like The Carter Case and The Undying Monster. He had a supporting role in 1941's Charley's Aunt (which starred Jack Benny) and played the romantic lead in 1943's The Gang's All Here, a Twentieth Century Fox musical in which he seemed somewhat lost among the vivid antics of Carmen Miranda, Charlotte Greenwood, and Edward Everett Horton (and was the only principal not to sing a note). He also co-starred with Tom Conway and Frances Dee in Val Lewton's production of I Walked with a Zombie, directed by Jacques Tourneur.

Ellison landed another romantic lead role as Jerry Gibson in the musical film Lady, Let's Dance (1944) which starred ice-skating sensation Belita. In 1950, Ellison landed the leading role in a series of B-western movies for Lippert Pictures, where he was billed as "Shamrock" Ellison.

In the early 1950s, Ellison moved from acting to real estate. Joining fellow veteran Jackie Coogan, Ellison returned to the screen to play Axel 'Longhorn' Gates in a picture called When the Girls Take Over (1962).

== Death ==
Ellison died at age 83 in Montecito, California, after suffering a broken neck as the result of a fall. He is interred at Forest Lawn Memorial Park in the Hollywood Hills of Los Angeles.

== Selected filmography ==
- Play Girl (1932) - Elmer
- The Famous Ferguson Case (1932) - Lane--Reporter (uncredited)
- Central Airport (1933) - Amarillo Pilot Crossing Fingers (uncredited)
- Eight Girls in a Boat (1934) - Romantic Boy (uncredited)
- Carolina (1934) - Dancer (uncredited)
- Death on the Diamond (1934) - Cubs Player (uncredited)
- Student Tour (1934) - Student (uncredited)
- Buried Loot (1935, Short) - Bob - Detective (uncredited)
- The Winning Ticket (1935) - Jimmy Powers
- After Office Hours (1935) - Harvey (uncredited)
- Reckless (1935) - Dale Every
- Hop-Along Cassidy (1935) - Johnny Nelson
- The Eagle's Brood (1935) - Johnny Nelson
- Bar 20 Rides Again (1935) - Johnny Nelson
- Hitch Hike Lady (1935) - Jimmy Peyton
- The Leathernecks Have Landed (1936) - Mac MacDonald
- Heart of the West (1936) - Johnny Nelson
- Call of the Prairie (1936) - Johnny Nelson
- Three on the Trail (1936) - Johnny Nelson
- The Plainsman (1936) - Buffalo Bill Cody
- Trail Dust (1936) - Johnny Nelson
- Borderland (1937) - Johnny Nelson
- 23 1/2 Hours Leave (1937) - Sgt. Robert Gray
- The Barrier (1937) - Lieutenant Burrell
- Annapolis Salute (1937) - Bill Martin
- Vivacious Lady (1938) - Keith Morgan
- Mother Carey's Chickens (1938) - Ralph Thurston
- Next Time I Marry (1938) - Anthony J. Anthony
- Almost a Gentleman (1939) - Dan Preston
- Zenobia (1939) - Jeff Carter
- Sorority House (1939) - Bill Loomis
- Hotel for Women (1939) - Jeff Buchanan
- Fifth Avenue Girl (1939) - Mike
- You Can't Fool Your Wife (1940) - Andrew 'Hinkie' Hinklin
- Anne of Windy Poplars (1940) - Tony Pringle
- Play Girl (1941) - Thomas Elwood Dice
- They Met in Argentina (1941) - Tim Kelly
- Charley's Aunt (1941) - Jack Chesney
- Ice-Capades (1941) - Bob Clemens
- Mr. District Attorney in the Carter Case (1941) - P. Cadwallader Jones
- Careful, Soft Shoulder (1942) - Thomas Aldrich
- Army Surgeon (1942) - Capt. James 'Jim' Mason
- That Other Woman (1942) - Henry Summers
- The Undying Monster (1942) - Robert Curtis
- Dixie Dugan (1943) - Roger Hudson
- I Walked with a Zombie (1943) - Wesley Rand
- Best Foot Forward (1943) - Cadet (uncredited)
- The Gang's All Here (1943) - Andy Mason
- Lady, Let's Dance (1944) - Jerry Gibson
- Johnny Doesn't Live Here Anymore (1944) - Mike O'Brien
- Hollywood and Vine (1945) - Larry Winters
- G.I. War Brides (1946) - Steve Giles
- Calendar Girl (1947) - Steve Adams
- The Ghost Goes Wild (1947) - Monte Crandall
- Last of the Wild Horses (1948) - Duke Barnum
- Hostile Country (1950) - Shamrock Ellison
- Everybody's Dancin' (1950) - Jimmy Ellison
- Marshal of Heldorado (1950) - James Shamrock Ellison
- Crooked River (1950) - Shamrock Ellison
- Colorado Ranger (1950) - Shamrock Kid
- West of the Brazos (1950) - James Everett Parkington 'Shamrock' Ellison
- Fast on the Draw (1950) - Shamrock Ellison
- I Killed Geronimo (1950) - Capt. Jeff Packard
- The Texan Meets Calamity Jane (1950) - Gordon Hastings
- Kentucky Jubilee (1951) - Jeff Benson
- Oklahoma Justice (1951) - Clancy
- Whistling Hills (1951) - Sheriff Dave Holland
- Texas Lawmen (1951) - Sheriff Tod Merrick
- Texas City (1952) - Jim Kirby
- Man from the Black Hills (1952) - Jim Fallon
- Dead Man's Trail (1952) - Dan Winslow
- When the Girls Take Over (1962) - Axel 'Longhorn' Gates (final film role, shot in 1960)
