= The Accused (1949 film) =

1949 film by William Dieterle

- Theatrical release poster
- Directed by: William Dieterle
- Screenplay by: Ketti Frings
- Based on: Be Still, My Love by June Truesdell
- Produced by: Hal B. Wallis
- Starring: Loretta Young; Robert Cummings
- Cinematography: Milton R. Krasner
- Edited by: Warren Low
- Music by: Victor Young
- Production company: Hal Wallis Productions
- Distributed by: Paramount Pictures
- Release date: January 12, 1949 (New York)
- Running time: 101 minutes
- Country: United States
- Language: English

The Accused is a 1949 American drama film starring Loretta Young, Robert Cummings and Wendell Corey. It was directed by William Dieterle, produced by Hal Wallis and written by Ketti Frings, based on Be Still, My Love, a 1947 novel written by June Truesdell.

== Plot ==
Wilma Tuttle is a college professor who unintentionally arouses the sexual interest of her student Bill. When Bill takes Wilma to a seaside cliff, he tries to force himself upon her. In Wilma's desperate attempt to repel Bill, she strikes him repeatedly with a piece of metal, causing his death. She hitches a ride home and opts to conceal her involvement in the crime, fearing that no one will believe her.

Wilma meets Warren Ford, a San Francisco attorney who had acted as Bill's guardian, as Bill was an impetuous, irresponsible man and an inveterate woman chaser. An inquest finds the death to be an accident, but detective Ted Dorgan suspects that it was murder. He gathers evidence that suggests that Bill was killed before falling down to the ocean below. Wilma becomes increasingly delirious as Dorgan continues to develop the case.

Wilma and Warren build a romantic relationship. Warren takes Wilma to a boxing match to forget her troubles, where she instead endures a wild fit of guilt and agony when she sees that one of the fighters resembles Bill. After Warren sees Dorgan inquiring at Wilma's apartment house, he proposes marriage and wants to bring her to live with him in San Francisco.

Dorgan learns of Bill's obsession with Wilma and, supported by physical evidence presented by crime-lab scientist Dr. Romley, Dorgan concludes that Wilma is the murderer. He confronts Wilma and a defiant Warren with his accusation and produces a note that Wilma had written after Bill's death in an attempt to avoid suspicion.

Warren defends Wilma at trial and delivers an impassioned speech to the jury explaining her actions and how her fear led her to conceal her involvement in Bill's death. After Warren's speech, Dorgan knows that the trial is essentially over and that Wilma will be acquitted.

== Cast ==
- Loretta Young as Dr. Wilma Tuttle
- Robert Cummings as Warren Ford
- Wendell Corey as Lt. Ted Dorgan
- Sam Jaffe as Dr. Romley
- Douglas Dick as Bill Perry
- Suzanne Dalbert as Susan Duval
- Sara Allgood as Mrs. Conner
- Mickey Knox as Jack Hunter
- George Spaulding as Dean Rhodes
- Francis Pierlot as Dr. Vinson
- Ann Doran as Miss Rice, Nurse
- Carole Mathews as Waitress
- Billy Mauch as Harry Brice
- Henry Travers as Blakely (uncredited)

== Production ==
In June 1946, Hal Wallis bought the film rights to an unpublished novel by June Trusedell, Be Still, My Love, for a reported price of $75,000. The film was to be a vehicle for Barbara Stanwyck and would be produced at Wallis' home base of Paramount Pictures. In December, Wallis disclosed that filming would begin in January 1947 with an overall budget of $8,500,000. However, production was delayed.

In March 1947, Don DeFore was announced as the male lead. In November, Stanwyck withdrew because "the script was too stupid to shoot". Wallis then cast her in Sorry, Wrong Number (1948), his only other script that was ready for production. In January 1948, Kirk Douglas, then under contract to Wallis, was linked to the project.

In February, Wallis announced that Loretta Young would play the lead and that the film would be titled Strange Deception. The other lead roles were assigned to Robert Cummings and Wendell Corey, both under contract to Wallis. According to Young, shortly before filming began, Wallis approached her suggesting that Cummings and Corey switch roles, with Cummings to play the detective and Corey the male lead. Young said: "I knew he wanted to switch because he had just put Wendell Corey under contract, and Robert Cummings was being eased out."

Filming finally began in April 1948.

Young later said that she loved the film and the script, adding that screenwriter Ketti Frings "was a wonderful writer ... she knew and liked women ... she also knew their stupid little frailties ... a very good story." Young also said that Wallis "bent over backwards trying to do everything nice all during the picture."

== Reception ==
In a contemporary review for The New York Times, critic Thomas M. Pryor called the film "no ordinary exercise in violence" and wrote:

This is a super-duper psychological job, well spiced with terminology which sounds impressive, if not always crystal clear in meaning, and the performers go about their business with an earnestness which commands attention. Under William Dieterle's assured direction, the story flows smoothly and methodically builds up suspense to a punchy climax ... On close examination it is possible to spot loopholes in the plot and, indeed, it may seem surprising that a woman of such intelligence couldn't view her dilemma with more perspicacity, but the authors have shrewdly attributed her desire to conceal the truth to her dread fear of the scandalous consequences. And who wants to argue about a person's actions when fear takes hold?"
