= A Blonde for a Night =

1928 film

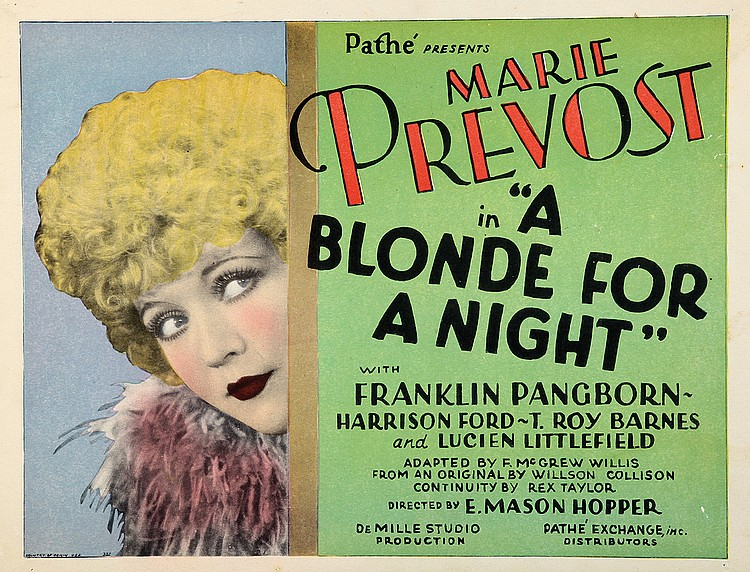
- Lobby card
- Directed by: E. Mason Hopper; F. McGrew Willis
- Written by: Betty Browne; Wilson Collison; John W. Krafft; Rex Taylor; F. McGrew Willis
- Starring: Marie Prevost; Franklin Pangborn; Harrison Ford
- Cinematography: Dewey Wrigley
- Edited by: James B. Morley
- Production company: DeMille Pictures Corporation
- Distributed by: Pathé Exchange
- Release date: February 26, 1928
- Running time: 60 minutes
- Country: United States
- Language: Silent (English intertitles)

A Blonde for a Night is a 1928 American silent comedy film directed by E. Mason Hopper and F. McGrew Willis and starring Marie Prevost, Franklin Pangborn and Harrison Ford.

The film's sets were designed by the art director Stephen Goosson.

== Plot ==
After an argument with her husband on their honeymoon in Paris, a wife disguises herself as a blonde woman to test her husband's fidelity.

== Cast ==
- Marie Prevost as Marcia Webster
- Franklin Pangborn as Hector
- Harrison Ford as Bob Webster
- T. Roy Barnes as George Mason
- Lucien Littlefield as Jenks

== Bibliography ==
- Munden, Kenneth White. The American Film Institute Catalog of Motion Pictures Produced in the United States, Part 1. University of California Press, 1997.
