= Vernon Smith (screenwriter) =

American screenwriter

Vernon Smith was a writer of American films. He contributed to 69 (mostly short) works between 1924 and 1951.

Some of his most known short works are The Constabule, Fight Night and All Night Long.

== Selected filmography ==
- The Girl from Everywhere (1927)
- Fugitives (1929)
- Call of the Prairie (1936) (screenplay)
- Three on the Trail (1936) (screenplay)
- Misbehaving Husbands (1940) (screenplay)
- Lady Luck, aka Lucky Ghost (1942) (story)
