= Richard Avonde =

Canadian film and television actor

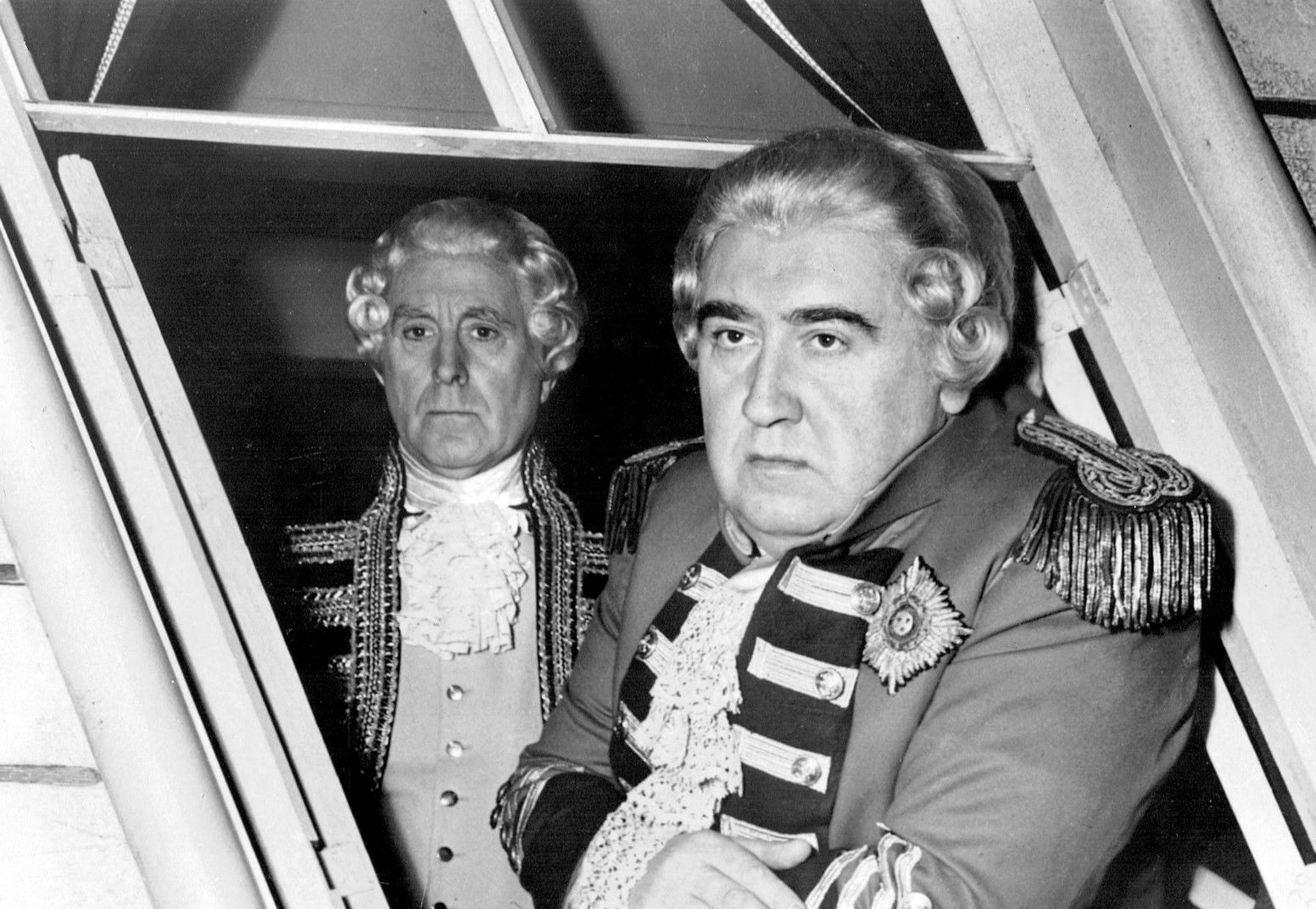
- Francis L. Sullivan (right) and Richard Avonde in "Margin for Victory", Cavalcade of America, 1954
- Born: May 22, 1914; Hamilton, Ontario, Canada
- Died: January 24, 1981 (aged 66); Van Nuys, California; United States
- Other name: Richard Louis Avonde
- Occupation: Actor
- Years active: 1946–1960 (film)

Richard Avonde (1914–1981) was a Canadian film actor who settled in the United States. He appeared in more than 50 films and television series.

In 1956, Avonde completed his 200th role in a television series when he appeared in an episode of Tales of the 77th Bengal Lancers on NBC.

== Filmography ==
Year	Title	Role	Notes
1946	The Razor's Edge	Escort at First Nightclub	Uncredited
1949	Tuna Clipper	Pete, a Pereira crewman	
1949	Always Leave Them Laughing	Minor Role	Uncredited
1950	Captain Carey, U.S.A.	Count Carlo de Cresci	
1950	Snow Dog	Henchman Phillippe	
1950	The Petty Girl	MC / Orchestra Leader	Uncredited
1950	Cyrano de Bergerac	Marquis	
1951	Oklahoma Justice	Hartley - Henchman	
1951	Lawless Cowboys	Ace Malloy	
1951	The Wild Blue Yonder	Joe Wurtzel	Uncredited
1952	Waco	Pedro - Henchman	
1952	The Gunman	Curt Blake - Henchman	
1952	Wild Horse Ambush	Jalisco	
1952	Outlaw Women	Frank Slater	
1952	Dead Man's Trail	Henchman Stewart	
1953	Fangs of the Arctic	Henchman Cheval	
1953	Rebel City	Dick - Bartender	Uncredited
1953	The 49th Man	Buzz Olin	
1953	Savage Frontier	Cherokee Kid	
1953	The Great Adventures of Captain Kidd	Captain of City Guard	Serial, (Chs. 2, 3), Uncredited
1953	Shadows of Tombstone	Deputy Todd	
1953	Vigilante Terror	Artie	
1954	Phantom of the Rue Morgue	Vendor	Uncredited
1955	The Purple Mask	Roger	
1957	Looking for Danger	Col. Ahmed Tabari	
1958	The Female Animal	Pepe, Lily's Gigolo	Uncredited

== Selected Television ==
Year	Title	Role	Notes
1953	The Lone Ranger	Pete Milliner	Episode " Right to Vote"
1953	The Lone Ranger	Pete Caspar	episode " El Toro"
1953	The Lone Ranger	Bart Devlin	Episode " The Perfect Crime"
1953	Hopalong Cassidy	Turk Shanns	Episode "Arizona Troubleshooters"
1954	Death Valley Days	Philo Clark	Season 2, Episode, "Little Papeete"
1954	Death Valley Days	Boy with Buggy / Reporter	Episode " Lotta Crabtree"
1955	Death Valley Days	Bruce Courtright	Episode "The Homeliest Man in Nevada"
1955	The Lone Ranger	Bart	Episode " The Bait: Gold!"
1956	The Adventures of Jim Bowie	Count Victor De Nivernais	Episode "The Swordsman"
1957	Gunsmoke	Nick Fane	Episode "Bureaucrat"
1957	The Life and Legend of Wyatt Earp	Lawrence Younger	Episode "The Vultures"
1957	The Adventures of Jim Bowie	Raul Guzman	Episode "Spanish Intrigue"
1957	The Adventures of Jim Bowie	Louis Colt	Episode "Charivari"
1960	Tales of Wells Fargo	Le Main	Episode "Kid Brother"

== Bibliography ==
- Blottner, Gene. Columbia Noir: A Complete Filmography, 1940-1962. McFarland, 2015.
