= The 49th Man =

1953 film by Fred F. Sears

- Theatrical poster
- Directed by: Fred F. Sears
- Screenplay by: Harry Essex
- Based on: Ivan Tors
- Produced by: Sam Katzman
- Starring: John Ireland; Richard Denning
- Narrated by: Gerald Mohr
- Cinematography: Lester White
- Edited by: William A. Lyon
- Production company: Columbia Pictures
- Distributed by: Columbia Pictures
- Release date: May 20, 1953
- Running time: 73 minutes
- Country: United States
- Language: English

The 49th Man is a 1953 American film noir crime film directed by Fred F. Sears, and starring John Ireland and Richard Denning. It was released by Columbia Pictures. The Cold War thriller was based on a story by Ivan Tors and the screenplay written by Harry Essex.

The film's title is a cryptic reference to the men in the film hired to smuggle 48 nuclear weapons components into the United States as part of a secret war game and the unexpected 49th man, using the war game as cover, smuggling in a real atomic bomb as part of a plot to destroy an American city.

== Plot ==
After a fatal car crash in Lordsburg, New Mexico, investigators find a mysterious machine component that they turn over to the nearby Los Alamos National Laboratory for identification. Scientists there declare that it is one component of an advanced portable nuclear weapon designed by an unknown, presumably hostile power. The discovery prompts Paul Reagan (Richard Denning), chief of the Security Investigation Division (SID), to send agent John Williams (John Ireland) to investigate the source of these components and to prevent them from being assembled into a functioning weapon. As more parts are smuggled into the United States, the investigation expands and a pattern begins to emerge which points to Marseilles, France.

After uranium is found welded to the hull of a U.S. Navy submarine in New London, Connecticut, Williams continues his investigation aboard that submarine, now bound for the French port, undercover as a naval officer preparing a training film. While in Marseilles, he learns that civilians Margo Wayne (Suzanne Dalbert) and her husband Leo Wayne (Peter Marshall) are working with clarinet player Buzz Olin (Richard Avonde) and an unknown member of the submarine's crew to smuggle the parts in special metal cases built by Pierre Neff (George Dee). After a fight near the dock, Williams believes that Lt. Magrew (Mike Connors) and Commander Jackson (Robert Foulk) are in on the plot. He orders them arrested, only to be betrayed by his colleague, agent Andy (Robert Hunter), and taken into custody himself.

Arriving in Washington, D.C., Williams escapes from his captors and contacts Reagan at SID headquarters where he finds Jackson and Magrew waiting for him in Reagan's office. The whole exercise was a war game, put on in secret by the Defense Department to test the nation's readiness for a subversive attack. However, the Waynes and Olin are not part of the war game. They have used Neff to construct 4 cases, in addition to the 48 ordered by the naval officers, and smuggled their own portable nuclear weapon into the United States. With less than 48 hours before the bomb's scheduled detonation at 3 p.m. on Tuesday, Williams and his team track Buzz Olin and the Waynes to the San Francisco area. After a desperate attempt to escape with the bomb and destroy San Francisco by air, Leo Wayne is killed and Jackson has just two hours to attempt to defuse the bomb while Williams flies towards Nevada. This fails and with less than a minute to go the bomb is dropped from the plane to detonate over Frenchman Flat at the Nevada Test Site. Crisis averted, the film ends with the narrator intoning, "...and three o'clock is just the middle of another afternoon in the life of a city."

== Cast ==
- John Ireland as SID agent John Williams
- Richard Denning as SID chief Paul Reagan
- Suzanne Dalbert as Margo Wayne
- Robert Foulk as Commander Jackson
- Mike Connors as Ensign Magrew (credited as "Touch Conners")
- Richard Avonde as Buzz Olin
- William Bryant as FBI Agent in Montage (as William R. Klein)
- Cicely Browne as Blonde Woman (as Cicely Brown)
- Tommy Farrell as Agent Reynolds
- Joseph Mell as Box of Taffy Man at Penn Station
- Robert Hunter as Andy - alias Andre
- Peter Marshall as Leo Wayne

== Production ==
- director of photography Lester White, A.S.C.
- art director Paul Palmentola
- film editor William A. Lyon, A.C.E.
- set decorator Louis Diage
- assistant director Milton Feldman
- sound engineer George Cooper
- musical director Mischa Bakaleinikoff
- certificate number 16329
- Western Electric recording
- produced by Sam Katzman
- associate producer Charles H. Schneer
