= The Girl from Everywhere =

1927 film

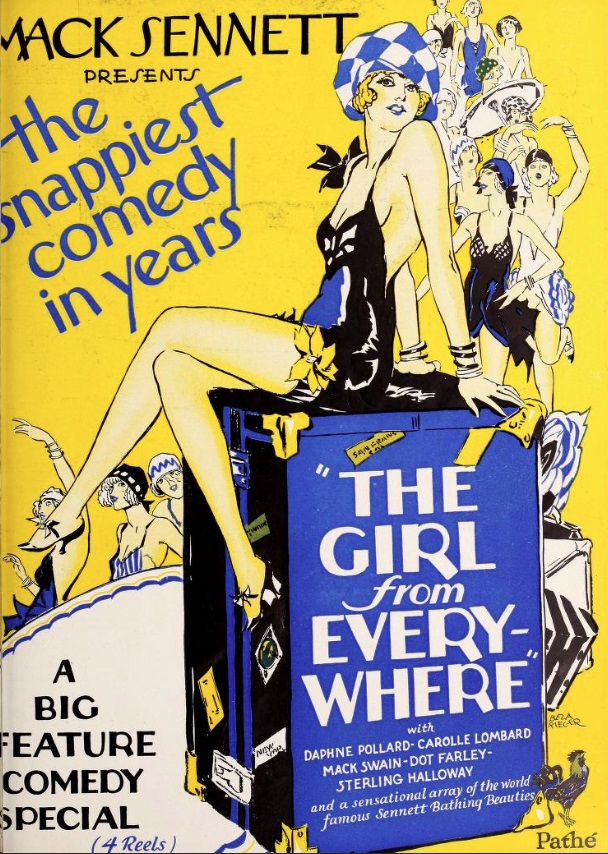
- Directed by: Edward F. Cline
- Written by: Vernon Smith; Harry McCoy; Al Giebler; Betty Browne
- Produced by: Mack Sennett; John A. Waldron
- Starring: Daphne Pollard; Dot Farley; Mack Swain; Carole Lombard
- Cinematography: St. Elmo Boyce; Lee Davis; Chandler House; Louis Jennings; Vernon L. Walker
- Edited by: William Hornbeck
- Production company: Mack Sennett Comedies
- Distributed by: Pathe Exchange; Wardour Films (UK)
- Release date: December 11, 1927
- Running time: 45 minutes
- Country: United States
- Languages: Silent; English intertitles

The Girl from Everywhere is a 1927 American silent comedy film directed by Edward F. Cline and starring Daphne Pollard, Dot Farley, Mack Swain and Carole Lombard. The film, produced by Mack Sennett, is a parody of silent filmmaking, and showcases his "bathing beauties".

== Cast ==
- Daphne Pollard as Minnie Stitch
- Dot Farley as Madame Zweibach
- Mack Swain as Wilfred Ashcraft - Director
- Carole Lombard as Vera Veranda - Miss Anybody
- Irving Bacon as The Casting Director
- Roger Moore as Mr. Filbert - Actor
- Sterling Holloway as Assistant Director
- Billy Bevan as Messenger
- Andy Clyde as Publicity Man
- Barney Hellum as Cameraman
- Willy Castello as Arab Sheik
- Carmelita Geraghty as Bathing Girl
- Ruth Hiatt as Mabel Smith
- Mary Ann Jackson as Bubbles Smith
- Raymond McKee as Jimmy Smith

== Bibliography ==
- Munden, Kenneth White. The American Film Institute Catalog of Motion Pictures Produced in the United States, Part 1. University of California Press, 1997.
