= Dead Man's Trail =

1952 film by Lewis D. Collins

- Directed by: Lewis D. Collins
- Written by: Joseph F. Poland
- Produced by: Vincent M. Fennelly
- Starring: Johnny Mack Brown; James Ellison; Barbara Woodell
- Cinematography: Ernest Miller
- Edited by: Sam Fields
- Music by: Raoul Kraushaar
- Production company: Silvermine Productions
- Distributed by: Monogram Pictures
- Release date: July 20, 1952
- Running time: 59 minutes
- Country: United States
- Language: English

Dead Man's Trail is a 1952 American Western film directed by Lewis D. Collins and starring Johnny Mack Brown, James Ellison and Barbara Woodell. It was distributed as a second feature by Monogram Pictures. The film's sets were designed by the art director Martin Obzina.

== Plot ==
Texas Ranger Johnny Mack Brown is sent to capture escaped convict Walt Winslow, who had been imprisoned for a $100,000 express robbery. The loot from the robbery was never recovered. When Brown finds him, Winslow has been fatally wounded by his ex-gang members in a stagecoach holdup and is only able to give the ranger a one-word clue to the stolen loot's hiding place before he dies. Brown finally discovers the money is hidden in a painting in a place called Silvertown.

== Cast ==
- Johnny Mack Brown as Johnny Mack Brown
- James Ellison as Dan Winslow
- Barbara Woodell as Mrs. Amelia Winslow
- I. Stanford Jolley as Silvertown Sheriff
- Terry Frost as Deputy Kelvin
- Lane Bradford as Brad Duncan
- Gregg Barton as Henchman Yeager
- Richard Avonde as Henchman Stewart
- Stanley Price as Blake
- Dale Van Sickel as Walt Winslow
- Bill Coontz as Stagecoach Driver
- John Hart as Ranger Captain
- Russ Whiteman as Lobo Sheriff
