= Wrestling Swordfish =

1931 film

- Written by: Gene Towne
- Produced by: Mack Sennett
- Distributed by: Educational Film Exchanges
- Release date: November 8, 1931
- Running time: 8 minutes
- Country: United States
- Language: English

Wrestling Swordfish is a 1931 American short adventure film produced by Mack Sennett. In 1932, it won an Oscar for Best Short Subject (Novelty) at the 5th Academy Awards.
