= Crooked River (film) =

1950 film by Thomas Carr

- Film poster
- Directed by: Thomas Carr
- Screenplay by: Ron Ormond; Maurie Tombragel
- Produced by: Robert L. Lippert
- Starring: James Ellison; Russell Hayden
- Cinematography: Ernest Miller
- Edited by: Hugh Winn
- Music by: Walter Greene
- Production company: Lippert Pictures
- Distributed by: Lippert Pictures
- Release date: May 5, 1950 (United States)
- Running time: 56 minutes
- Country: United States
- Language: English

Crooked River (also known as Hostile Country) is a 1950 American Western film directed by Thomas Carr and starring James Ellison and Russell Hayden.

== Plot ==
An outlaw helps a man hunt the bandits who killed his parents.

== Cast ==
- James Ellison as Shamrock Ellison (as Jimmie "Shamrock" Ellison)
- Russell Hayden as Lucky Hayden (as Russ "Lucky" Hayden)
- Raymond Hatton as Colonel
- Fuzzy Knight as Deacon
- Julie Adams as Ann Hayden (as Betty Adams)
- Tom Tyler as Weston - Henchman
- George J. Lewis as Deke Gentry (as George Lewis)
- John Cason as Kent
- Stanley Price as Sheriff
- Stephen Carr as Butch Henchman
- Dennis Moore as Bob - Henchman
- George Chesebro as Dad Ellison
- Bud Osborne as Bud - Stage Driver
- Jimmy Martin as Henchman (as Jimmie Martin)
