= Washington Merry-Go-Round (film) =

1932 film directed by James Cruze

- Theatrical release poster
- Directed by: James Cruze
- Screenplay by: Jo Swerling
- Story by: Maxwell Anderson
- Based on: the book Washington Merry-Go-Round by Robert Sharon Allen and Drew Pearson
- Produced by: Walter Wanger
- Starring: Lee Tracy; Constance Cummings; Walter Connolly; Alan Dinehart
- Cinematography: Ira H. Morgan (as Ira Morgan); Ted Tetzlaff
- Edited by: Richard Cahoon
- Production company: Columbia Pictures
- Distributed by: Columbia Pictures
- Release date: October 15, 1932
- Running time: 79 minutes
- Country: United States
- Language: English

Washington Merry-Go-Round is a 1932 American pre-Code political drama film starring Lee Tracy, Constance Cummings, Walter Connolly, and Alan Dinehart. It was produced by Walter Wanger and directed by James Cruze.

== Plot ==
Button Gwinnett Brown is a new congressman in the U.S. House of Representatives. He refuses bribes, vowing to rid Washington of corruption; but crosses swords with powerful senator Edward Norton, who wants to enlist Brown to help Prohibition bootleggers. Norton also happens to be chasing elder senator Wylie's granddaughter Alice, for whom Brown too has fallen. In order to silence the idealistic newcomer, politicians stage a phony re-count and Brown loses his Senate seat. However, with the help of Senator Wylie and Alice, Brown manages to win back his place and clean up the halls of government.

== Cast ==
- Lee Tracy as Button Gwinnett Brown
- Constance Cummings as Alice Wylie
- Walter Connolly as Senator Wylie
- Alan Dinehart as Edward T. Norton
- Arthur Vintonas as Beef Brannigan
- Arthur Hoyt as Willis
- Berton Churchill as Speaker of the House
- Frank Sheridan as John Kelleher
- Clay Clement as Conti
- Clarence Muse as Clarence

== Critical reception ==
The New York Times wrote: "Washington Merry-Go-Round is a sturdy piece of work with melodramatic interludes. At times it is somewhat reckless in its dealings, but, allowing for its explosive utterances and its eagerness to win popular favor as an entertainment, it arouses a certain amount of interest. There are excellent performances by the cast, headed by the vehement Lee Tracy, and Mr. Cruze's direction is for the most part genuinely able".

In the current day, Leonard Maltin wrote that the film "remains surprisingly relevant today, with engaging performances and strong feel for the political arena, but peters out after great first half".

AllMovie called it "a ridiculously contrived political tale that even in its time must have been viewed as overly simplistic".
