= Oklahoma Justice =

1951 film by Lewis D. Collins

- Directed by: Lewis D. Collins
- Written by: Joseph O'Donnell
- Produced by: Vincent M. Fennelly
- Starring: Johnny Mack Brown; James Ellison; Lane Bradford
- Cinematography: Ernest Miller
- Edited by: Sam Fields
- Music by: Raoul Kraushaar
- Production company: Frontier Pictures
- Distributed by: Monogram Pictures
- Release date: August 19, 1951
- Running time: 56 minutes
- Country: United States
- Language: English

Oklahoma Justice is a 1951 American Western film directed by Lewis D. Collins and starring Johnny Mack Brown, James Ellison and Lane Bradford. It was distributed as a second feature by Monogram Pictures. The film's sets were designed by the art director Dave Milton.

== Cast ==
- Johnny Mack Brown as Johnny Mack Brown
- James Ellison as Clancy
- Lane Bradford as Henchman Deuce Logan
- Phyllis Coates as Goldie Vaughn
- I. Stanford Jolley as Sam Fleming
- Marshall Reed as Blackie Martin
- Barbara Woodell as Ma Posey
- Zon Murray as Henchnan Tad
- Richard Avonde as Henchman Hartley
- Stanley Price as bartender
- Kenne Duncan as Sheriff Barnes
