= Bob Dylan England Tour 1965 =

1965 concert tour by Bob Dylan

- Tour by Bob Dylan
- Bob Dylan performing during his 1965 tour of England. This tour would be his last performed solo and acoustic.
- Location: United Kingdom
- Associated album: Bringing It All Back Home
- Start date: April 30, 1965
- End date: May 10, 1965

Bob Dylan concert chronology
- England Tour (1965); North America (1965)

The Bob Dylan England Tour 1965 was a concert tour by American singer-songwriter Bob Dylan during late April and early May 1965. The tour was documented by filmmaker D. A. Pennebaker, who used the footage of the tour in his documentary Dont Look Back.

== Tour dates ==
Date	City	Country	Venue
April 30, 1965	Sheffield	England	Sheffield City Hall
May 1, 1965	Liverpool	England	Liverpool Odeon Theatre
May 2, 1965	Leicester	England	De Montfort Hall
May 5, 1965	Birmingham	England	Birmingham Town Hall
May 6, 1965	Newcastle	England	Newcastle City Hall
May 7, 1965	Manchester	England	Free Trade Hall
May 9, 1965	London	England	Royal Albert Hall
May 10, 1965	London	England	Royal Albert Hall

== Set lists ==
As Dylan was still playing exclusively folk music live, much of the material performed during this tour was written pre-1965. Each show was divided into two halves, with seven songs performed during the first, and eight during the second. The set consisted of two songs from The Freewheelin' Bob Dylan, three from The Times They Are a-Changin', three from Another Side of Bob Dylan, a comic-relief concert staple; "If You Gotta Go, Go Now", issued as a single in Europe, and six songs off his then-recent album, Bringing It All Back Home, including the second side in its entirety.

First half

1. "The Times They Are a-Changin'"
2. "To Ramona"
3. "Gates of Eden"
4. "If You Gotta Go, Go Now (or Else You Got to Stay All Night)"
5. "It's Alright, Ma (I'm Only Bleeding)"
6. "Love Minus Zero/No Limit"
7. "Mr. Tambourine Man"

Second Half

1. "Talkin' World War III Blues"
2. "Don't Think Twice, It's All Right"
3. "With God on Our Side"
4. "She Belongs to Me"
5. "It Ain't Me Babe"
6. "The Lonesome Death of Hattie Carroll"
7. "All I Really Want to Do"
8. "It's All Over Now, Baby Blue"

Set list per Olof Bjorner.
