= Betty Browne =

American screenwriter

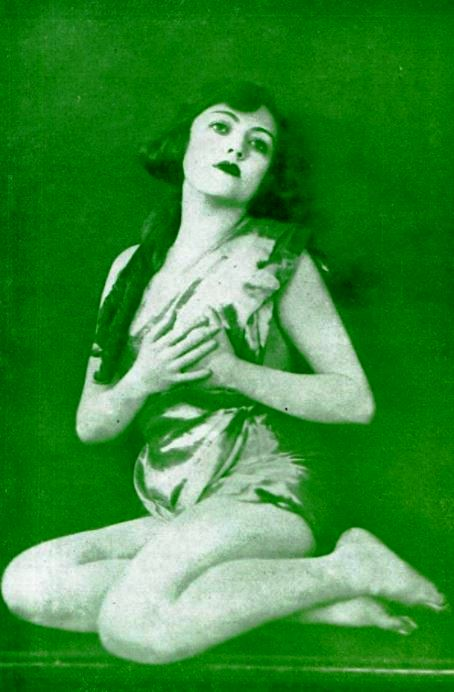
- Betty Browne in the 1922 Broadway musical operetta The Rose of Stamboul
- Born: Elizabeth L. Browne; January 19, 1900; New York, New York, US
- Died: December 30, 1959 (aged 59); Los Angeles, California, US
- Occupation: Screenwriter
- Years active: 1927–1929
- Spouse(s): Leslie Casey (div.); Gene Towne

Betty Browne was an American screenwriter and stage actress primarily known for writing intertitles for comedy shorts during Hollywood's silent era.

== Biography ==
Betty was born in New York City to Mr. Browne (who died when she was an infant) and Aimee Fitzgerald. She was the granddaughter of former Supreme Court Justice Edward Browne.

Betty started out her career in entertainment as an actress and a Ziegfeld girl. She married Australian actor and Broadway producer Leslie Casey in New York City in 1918. She later married fellow screenwriter Gene Towne for a time; the pair had a daughter before divorcing.

== Selected filmography ==
- Taxi Spooks (1929)
- Baby's Birthday (1929)
- Hubby's Weekend Trip (1929)
- A Taxi Scandal (1928)
- The Bargain Hunt (1928)
- Smith's Catalina Rowboat Race (1928)
- Motorboat Mamas (1928)
- Taxi for Two (1928)
- The Chicken (1928)
- The Bicycle Flirt (1928)
- A Blonde for a Night (1928)
- Love at First Flight (1928)
- The Girl from Everywhere (1927)
