= Suzanne Dalbert =

French actress (1927–1970)

- Born: 12 May 1927; Paris, France
- Died: 31 December 1970 (aged 43); France
- Occupation: Actress
- Years active: 1948 - 1957
- Spouse(s): Mike Conrad (1950-?); Jud Kinberg
- Children: 1

Suzanne Dalbert (12 May 1927 – 31 December 1970) was a French actress who appeared in a number of American films and television series during the 1940s and 50s.

== Biography ==
Dalbert was born in Paris, France. When her studies at the Lycee Victor Duruy school in Paris were completed, she performed with a troupe organized by Louis Jouvet for a South American tour. Over a span of three years she progressed from bit parts to lead roles.

After she moved to the United States in 1945, she first wrote and translated for broadcasts of the Voice of America. She later moved to Hollywood to find work in films. She was discovered by the Paramount studio head Hal Wallis who hoped to develop her into a major star. She was cast in a supporting role in The Accused but was left demoralised at her treatment by the overbearing director William Dieterle.

Dalbert did not develop as a leading star but she appeared in a mixture of small roles in larger-budget films while playing the female lead in B Pictures, such as Trail of the Yukon (1949). In 1949, she participated in a later famous Life magazine photo layout, in which she posed with other up-and-coming actresses, Marilyn Monroe, Lois Maxwell, Cathy Downs, Enrica Soma, Laurette Luez and Jane Nigh. From 1951 onwards, she appeared mostly in television before retiring in 1957 and returning to her native France.

== Personal life and death ==
Dalbert married film producer Jud Kinberg in 1953. She died on 31 December 1970 at age 43 from suicide by overdose.

== Filmography ==
Year	Title	Role	Notes
1948	Sorry, Wrong Number	Cigarette Girl	Uncredited
1949	The Accused	Susan Duval	
1949	Trail of the Yukon	Marie Laroux	
1950	Mark of the Gorilla	Nyobi	
1950	Breakthrough	Collette	
1951	My Favorite Spy	Theresa	
1951	The Lady and the Bandit	Cecile	
1951	Target Unknown	Barefoot Maid	Uncredited
1952	Thunderbirds	Marie Etienne	
1953	The 49th Man	Margo Wayne	
1956	The Best Things in Life Are Free	Hostess	Uncredited

== Bibliography ==
- Dick, Bernard F. Hal Wallis: Producer to the Stars. University Press of Kentucky, 2004.
