= Loew's State Theatre (Boston) =

Former theater in Boston, Massachusetts (1922–1968)

Coordinates: 42.34517°N 71.08702°W

Loew's State Theatre was a theater in Boston, Massachusetts, United States. Originally opened in 1922, it was later renamed the Donnelly Memorial Theatre in 1959 and the Back Bay Theatre in 1964. Designed by Thomas W. Lamb, the theater was located at 205 Massachusetts Avenue. The theater was closed in May, 1968 and demolished.

== History ==
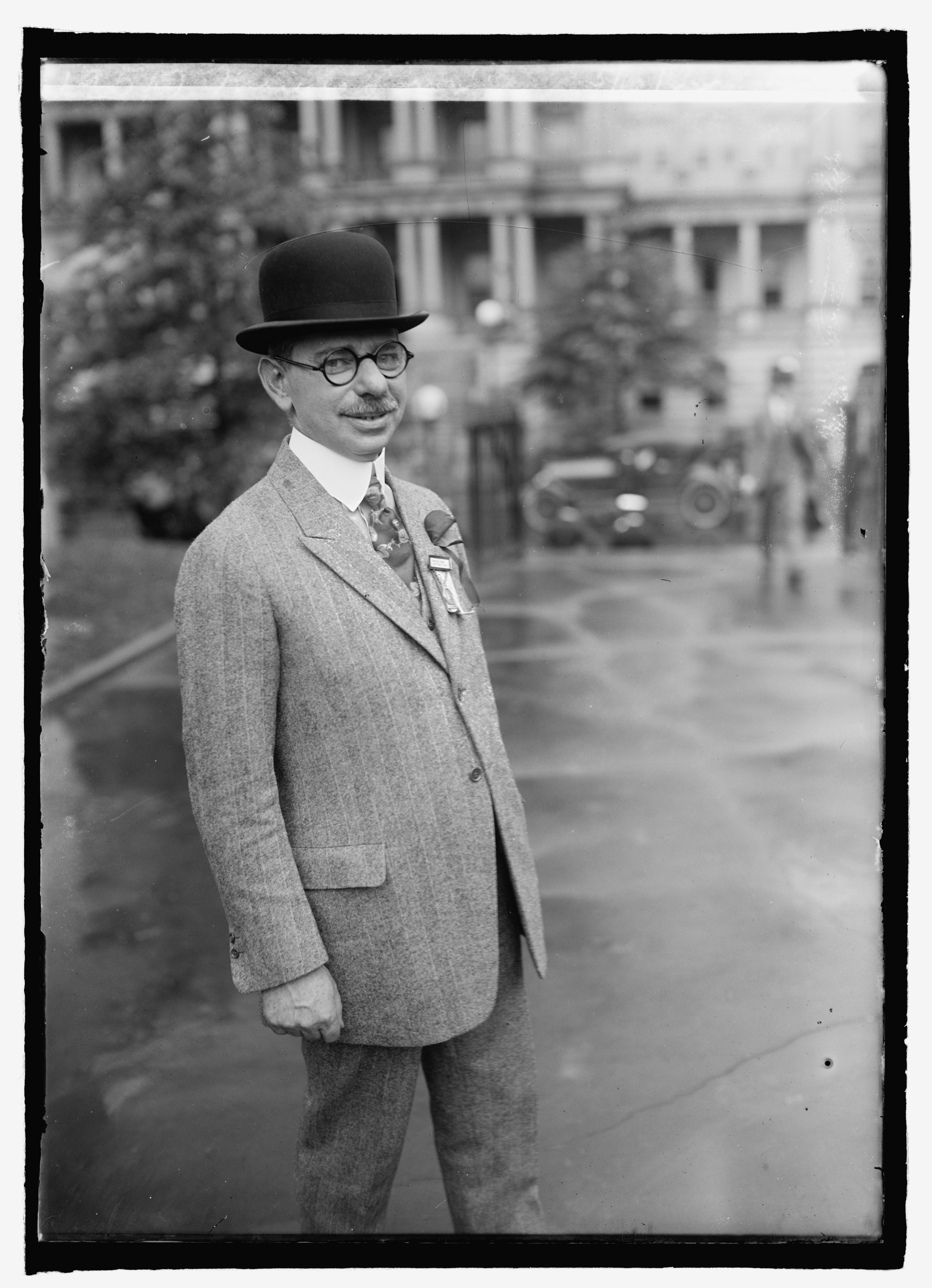
Marcus Loew in 1922

=== Loew's State Theatre ===
Marcus Loew's State Theatre Company separately acquired adjoining properties totaling 55,091 square feet along Massachusetts Avenue between Norway and Astor (now Burbank) streets in 1919 and 1920. Architect Lamb designed the theater in Adam style and the final cost exceeded $2 million. The venue seated 3,700 and was the second largest theater in the United States, the first being the other Loew's State in New York City^{[a]} A smaller, connected building named Fine Arts Theatre was also built and leased, which had a separate entrance on Norway Street.

Opening night was March 13, 1922. In the morning, dozens of actors arrived at South Station at 10:00 A.M. and afterward received at the Massachusetts State House and Boston City Hall in the afternoon prior to the screenings. A motorcade parade extended though the city proper and into South Boston. In the evening the pictures shown were The World's Champion starring Wallace Reid, comedy The Rainmaker, and And Women Must Weep. Ethel Clayton's The Cradle was scheduled to be shown but cut due to the lengthy opening ceremonies. Guests of honor governor Channing H. Cox and mayor James Michael Curley gave speeches.

Described as "the largest aggregation of movie stars ever assembled in one city", actors that participated in the festivities and the premier included: Diana Allen, Mary Anderson, Florence Avery, Theda Bara, Nora Bayes, Al Bedell, Monte Blue, Charles Brabin, Betty Browne, Marguerite Clayton, William Collier Jr., Miriam Cooper, Viola Dana, Helene "Smiles" Davis, Rubye De Remer, Doraldina, Billie Dove, Jeanne Eagels, Edward Earle, Frank Fay, Louise Fazenda, Ann Forrest, Pauline Garon, Edward Golden, Bernard Granville, Creighton Hale, Johnny Hines, Zena Keefe, Crawford Kent, James Kirkwood, Robert Z. Leonard, Sheldon Lewis, Montagu Love, Bert Lytell, Mae Marsh, Billy Mason, Loretta McDermott, Janet McGrew, Mae Murray, Virginia Pearson, Harry Pilcer, Teddy Sampson, Hermine Shone, Edith Stockton, Blanche Sweet, Conway Tearle, Grace Valentine, Nina Whitmore and Betty Woodmore. Thousands that could not get tickets jammed the streets in order to catch glimpses of the movie stars.

The Royal Ballet had a five day performance at the theater in 1957.

=== Donnelly Memorial Theatre ===
In 1959, the theater was purchased for an undisclosed amount by the Boston Archdiocese. Cardinal Richard Cushing acquired the property for the stated purpose of holding conventions, lectures, meetings and the showing of religious motion pictures. The cardinal also planned to use the theater as an instrument to warn Catholics in South America against the "false prophets of communism". The venue was christened the Donnelly Memorial Theatre in memory of Edward Calvin Donnelly, Sr., Catherine Donnelly, and John Donnelly for their long involvement and contributions to the Catholic Church. The Donnelly family business was in the outdoor advertising industry in Boston from 1850–1978. The archdiocese later sold the theater to the Christian Science Church in 1963.

=== Back Bay Theatre ===
Located across the street on Mass Ave, the First Church of Christ planned a future demolition of the building and expansion of their campus upon acquiring more area properties. In the interim, the building was renamed the Back Bay Theatre and rented as a live performance and concert hall. Pete Seeger, Al Hirt, Peter, Paul and Mary, Ray Charles, The Lovin' Spoonful, Cream, The Mothers of Invention, Jefferson Airplane, The Beach Boys and The Doors all performed at the venue. Jimi Hendrix also possibly played here in Little Richard's band in 1965.

== Theatre organ ==
During the silent film era, live background music accompanied the running of films. The State had a 3/13 Wurlitzer 235 Special, Opus 1349 theatre organ installed, which was removed from the theater shortly before demolition in 1968. The organ survives today, installed at Babson College.

== Closing and demolition ==
The theater was closed in May, 1968 with a sold out final performance by The Four Seasons. Razed during the summer of 1968, Symphony Community Park and Church Park Apartments now take up part of the former theater's footprint.

== See also ==
- Orpheum Theatre (Boston)
- Marcus Loew

== Notes ==
- ^{a} Despite Loew intimating the Boston venue was smaller, the seating in Boston outnumbered the New York building (3,700 to 3,200)
