= Gene Towne =

American screenwriter

- Born: March 27, 1904; New York, New York, U.S.
- Died: March 17, 1979 (aged 74); Woodland Hills, California, U.S.
- Occupation: Screenwriter
- Years active: 1921–1958
- Spouse: Betty Browne

Gene Towne (March 27, 1904 – March 17, 1979) was an American screenwriter. He wrote for 47 films between 1921 and 1958. He was born in New York, New York, and died in Woodland Hills, California from a heart attack.

== Partial filmography ==
- The Life of Riley (1927)
- Ladies' Night in a Turkish Bath (1928)
- The Butter and Egg Man (1928)
- Lady Be Good (1928)
- Outcast (1928)
- The Czar of Broadway (1930)
- Wrestling Swordfish (1931)
- Business and Pleasure (1932)
- Broadway Through a Keyhole (1933)
- Shanghai (1935)
- Mary Burns, Fugitive (1935)
- She Couldn't Take It (1935)
- The Girl Friend (1935)
- You Only Live Once (1937)
- Ali Baba Goes to Town (1937)
- Eternally Yours (1939)
