= The Case of the Black Cat =

1936 film by William C. McGann

- Directed by: William McGann; Alan Crosland (uncredited)
- Screenplay by: F. Hugh Herbert
- Story by: Erle Stanley Gardner
- Based on: The Case of the Caretaker's Cat; 1935 novel by Erle Stanley Gardner
- Produced by: Bryan Foy
- Starring: Ricardo Cortez; June Travis; Jane Bryan; Craig Reynolds
- Cinematography: Allen G. Siegler
- Edited by: Frank Magee
- Production company: Warner Bros. Pictures, Inc.
- Release date: 31 October 1936
- Country: United States
- Language: English

The Case of the Black Cat is a 1936 American mystery film directed by William C. McGann and an uncredited Alan Crosland, based on the 1935 Perry Mason novel The Case of the Caretaker's Cat by Erle Stanley Gardner. The film stars Ricardo Cortez as Perry Mason and co-stars June Travis and Jane Bryan in her film debut. The film is the fifth Perry Mason adaptation distributed by Warner Bros. Pictures in the 1930s and the first in the series not to feature Warren William as Mason.

== Plot ==
Mason is summoned to the Laxter mansion in the dead of night to write granddaughter Wilma out of invalid Peter Laxter's will, to keep her from marrying suspected fortune hunter Doug. Peter dies in a mysterious fire and Laxter's two grandsons, Sam Laxter and Frank Oafley, inherit his estate on the condition old caretaker Schuster and his cat Clinker are kept on. When cat-hating Sam threatens Clinker, Perry steps in and learns Laxter's death was suspicious and the family fortune and diamonds are missing.

== Cast ==
- Ricardo Cortez as Perry Mason
- June Travis as Della Street
- Garry Owen as Paul Drake
- Jane Bryan as Wilma Laxter
- Wild Bill Elliott as Sam Laxter
- Harry Davenport as Peter Laxter
- Craig Reynolds as Frank Oafley
- Clarence Wilson as Mr. Shuster
- Guy Usher as District Attorney Hamilton Burger
- Harry Hayden as Reverend Stillwell

== Production ==
The Case of the Black Cat was the penultimate of six Perry Mason feature films Warner Bros. made between 1934 and 1936. Despite promotional material connecting the film to Edgar Allan Poe and horror-like image, Michael R. Pitts described the film as a fast-paced murdery mystery. Ricardo Cortez and June Travis take over from Warren William and Claire Dodd as criminal attorney Perry Mason and his faithful secretary Della Street respectively. Although the characters had been married in the previous film, The Case of the Velvet Claws (1936), they are unattached again here.

Production began on the film in early July 1936 and was developed under the working title The Case of the Caretaker's Cat. The Hollywood Reporter reported that director William McGann took over as the director of the film after the death of Alan Crosland in a car accident.

== Release ==
The Case of the Black Cat was distributed by Warner Bros. Pictures and The Vitaphone Corp. on October 31, 1936.

Warner Home Video released the film on DVD via their Warner Archive Collection alongside The Case of the Howling Dog, The Case of the Curious Bride, The Case of the Lucky Legs, The Case of the Velvet Claws and The Case of the Stuttering Bishop in a set entitled Perry Mason: The Original Warner Bros. Movies Collection.

== Critical response ==
From contemporary reviews, Harrison's Reports described the film as "a pretty good program murder mystery melodrama" that "holds the spectator's attention because of the involved plot and the fact that the identity of the murderer is not disclosed until the end." Film Daily praised the film as one that will "really satisfy thrill fans, and keep the crime solvers guessing to the very end" opining that "it is practically impossible for anyone to guess the solution. Very effective work is done by Ricardo Cortez and June Travis." The Motion Picture Guide declared it "a passable mystery. Fair." while Variety said "will hold the patron's once they're inside, though its power to draw them in is doubtful." William Boehnel of the New York Herald Tribune found it to be "probably the least effective of all the Perry Mason detective films [...] A mediocre story to begin with, it is not only developed with a minimum of suspense and thrills" and declared it so confusing at times that it would take Sam Spade, Bill Crane and Reggie Fortune, Charlie Chan, Lord Peter Wimsey and Phil Vance to "piece it together convincingly."

From retrospective reviews, Pitts stated that the film will be "a disappointment to horror fans, The Case of the Black Cat is a fairly pleasing mystery." Hans J. Wollstein of AllMovie declared that the film was "better than its B-movie reputation" and that the film "may not deliver the glib repartee of its predecessors, but a strong and rather intricate plot that keeps the audience guessing makes up for this shortcoming." Wollstein continued that Ricardo Cortez "makes a fine Mason, closer, perhaps, to Erle Stanley Garner's original character than his suave predecessor, Warren William." and that the film suffered when it changed directors noting that William McGann "seems to have been little more than a competent traffic cop."
