= The Case of the Howling Dog =

1934 film by Alan Crosland

- Theatrical release poster
- Directed by: Alan Crosland
- Written by: Erle Stanley Gardner (story); Ben Markson
- Produced by: Sam Bischoff
- Starring: Warren William; Mary Astor
- Cinematography: William Rees
- Edited by: James Gibbon
- Music by: Bernhard Kaun
- Production company: First National Pictures
- Distributed by: Warner Bros. Pictures
- Release date: September 22, 1934
- Running time: 75 minutes
- Country: United States
- Language: English

The Case of the Howling Dog is a 1934 American mystery film directed by Alan Crosland, based on the 1934 novel of the same name by Erle Stanley Gardner. It is the first in a series of six Perry Mason films Warner Bros. Pictures made between the years 1934 and 1937.

The film stars Warren William and Mary Astor. William would star as Mason in the first four films: after The Case of the Howling Dog there were: The Case of the Curious Bride (1935), The Case of the Lucky Legs (1935), and The Case of the Velvet Claws (1936). Ricardo Cortez took over the role of Perry Mason in the fifth film, The Case of the Black Cat (1936), then Donald Woods became Mason in the sixth, The Case of the Stuttering Bishop (1937). Each film in the series would feature a different actress portraying Della Street except for Claire Dodd, who played her twice; in this movie Street is portrayed by Helen Trenholme. The characters were revived in the popular CBS television series Perry Mason which starred Raymond Burr as Perry Mason.

== Plot ==
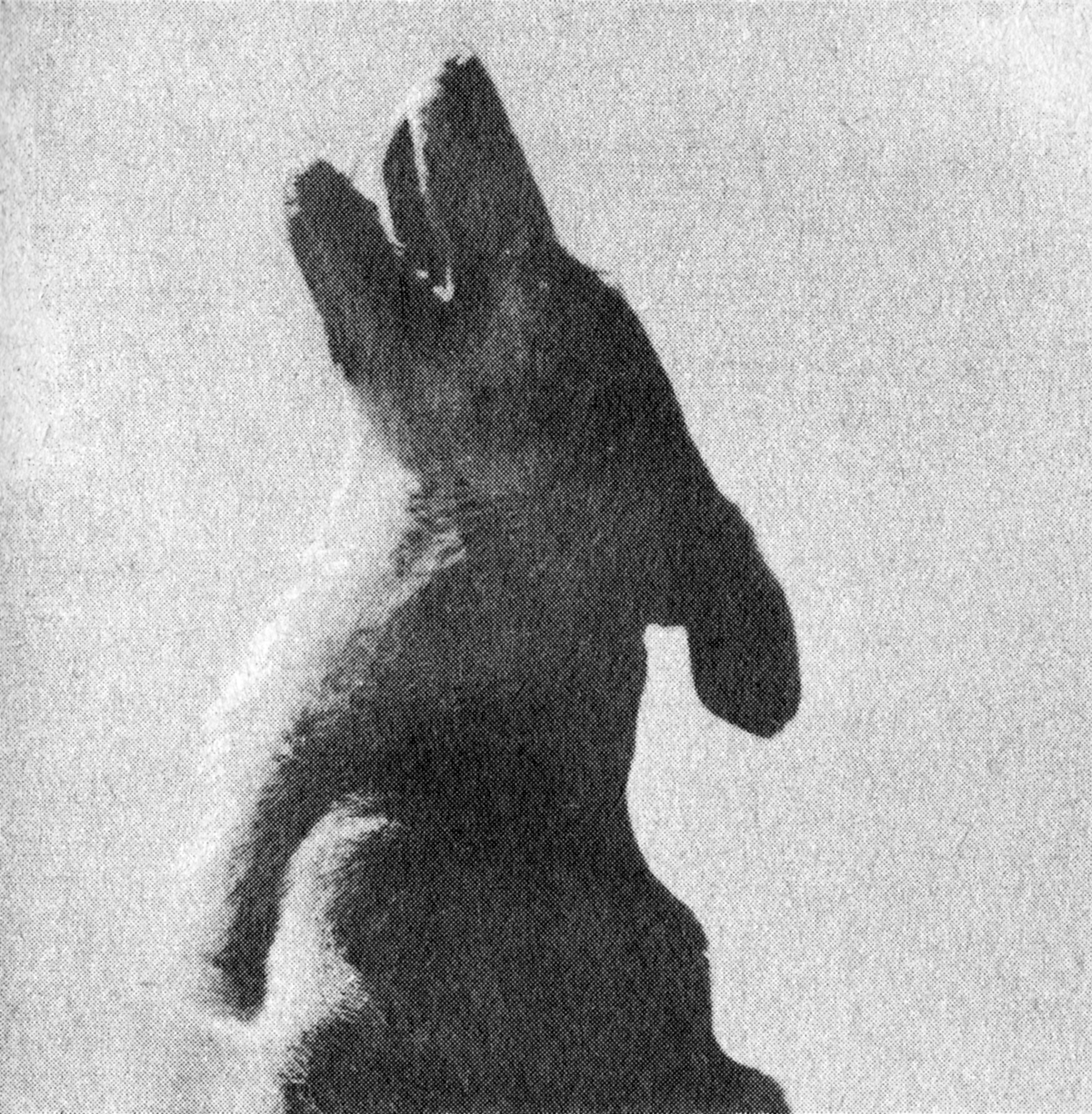
Lightning in The Case of the Howling Dog

Severely agitated by the howling of a German Shepherd police dog next door, millionaire Arthur Cartwright comes to Los Angeles lawyer Perry Mason to draw up his will, stating that the howling is a sign that a death has occurred. He wants to leave his money to the apparent wife of Clinton Foley, another millionaire and the dog's owner, explaining that while "Evelyn Foley" pretends to be Foley's wife, he is still legally married to someone else. Perry explains how Cartwright should word his odd bequest and after receiving a huge retainer fee, gives him a form to fill out and return. When Perry receives the form the next day, Cartwright has changed the beneficiary to Foley's actual wife. The fee paid by Cartwright obligates Perry to legally and morally represent the real Mrs. Foley to the best of his ability.

Foley attempts to file a complaint of insanity against Cartwright, claiming he is a homicidal maniac whose bizarre behavior prompted most of Foley's household staff to quit. A sheriff's deputy is assigned to investigate the complaint. He and Perry accompany Foley back to his house, where Perry questions why an addition to his garage is being built for yet another car if his chauffeur has quit. Attractive Lucy Benton, who Foley states is his housekeeper, rushes from the house with her right hand heavily bandaged to tell Foley that she was bitten by the dog while giving it an emetic, thinking it had been poisoned. When they ask to talk to Foley's "wife" Evelyn, Lucy tells them that she has just packed her bags and disappeared. A note left behind states that she loves Cartwright and is going away with him. Perry goes next door and finds that Cartwright has also disappeared overnight. A telegram sent from Ventura and signed by Evelyn is sent to Foley asking him to stop his actions.

Perry's private detectives investigate and learn that Evelyn was actually Cartwright's wife who ran away with Foley when they were friends in Santa Barbara with Foley and his wife Bessie. Lucy was Foley's private secretary then, unbeknownst to Evelyn. One of Perry's men is assigned to watch Foley's house and sees Lucy drive away with an unknown man. A cab arrives with a woman in black. When Foley shows annoyance that she "found him", she tells him that she "wants justice" and he releases the dog to attack her. Two shots are fired, killing the dog and Foley, followed by the slamming of the garden door, and the woman flees. Perry arrives for a meeting with Foley and discovers the bodies. He immediately tracks down the cab driver at his cab stand, learning that a perfumed handkerchief left in the cab links "Bessie" to the murder scene, and then finds the woman, who is the actual wife and his client, in a hotel under an assumed name. He sends his secretary, Della Street, to impersonate Bessie and claim the handkerchief before the cabbie turns it in. Bessie denies killing her husband. Perry warns her that she is going to be arrested for Foley's murder and orders her to say nothing to the police. Later, acting on a hunch when none of the handwriting samples of the three women gathered by his operatives matches the note and the handwritten copy of the telegram, Perry devises a ruse to obtain a page from Lucy's diary of the day after the Cartwrights disappeared.

During the trial, Perry discredits the cab driver's identification of his passenger when he demonstrates that he misidentified Della as Bessie. During his cross-examination of Lucy, Perry has the trial shifted to the scene of the crime, shows that the dog was devoted to all three women, and proves that Lucy was Foley's lover and is ambidextrous, writing the note, the telegram, and the diary page with her left hand. Just then, workers excavating the foundation of the garage addition discover the bodies of Cartwright and Evelyn, murdered by Foley. Bessie is acquitted after Perry in closing arguments states that because the dog loved her, he would never have attacked Bessie and been killed, destroying the prosecution's only other link of Bessie to the crime. After the trial, Perry presents Bessie with a dog that looks just like the dead animal, and the dog delightedly greets Bessie. Perry states that when the howling suddenly stopped, he searched kennels in the area and found one where a man matching Foley's description exchanged the dog for a lookalike. He gives Bessie the dog and orders her not to tell anyone what really happened. Perry later tells Della that he is sure that whatever Bessie did was in self-defense, and that she cannot be tried again for the murder due to double jeopardy.

== Cast ==
- Warren William as Perry Mason
- Mary Astor as Bessie Foley
- Gordon Westcott as Arthur Cartwright
- Allen Jenkins as Detective Sergeant Holcomb
- Grant Mitchell as District Attorney Claude Drumm
- Helen Trenholme as Della Street
- Helen Lowell as Elizabeth Walker, Cartwright's Housekeeper
- Dorothy Tree as Lucy Benton
- Harry Tyler as Sam Martin, Taxi Driver
- Arthur Aylesworth as Sheriff Bill Pemberton
- Russell Hicks as Clinton Foley
- Frank Reicher as Dr. Carl Cooper
- Addison Richards as Judge Markham
- James P. Burtis as George Dobbs (as James Burtis)
- Eddie Shubert as Edgar 'Ed' Wheeler
- Harry Seymour as David Clark
- Lightning (dog) as Prince

== Production ==
This was the very first screen adaptation of a Perry Mason novel. Erle Stanley Gardner's first Perry Mason mystery The Case of the Velvet Claws was published in March 1933, just the previous year (it would go on to be adapted as the fourth entry in the Warner Bros. film series: The Case of the Velvet Claws). The book this movie was based on, The Case of the Howling Dog, came out in March 1934; the movie was released in September. It was produced by First National Pictures, which since 1929 had been Warner Bros. trade name for the distribution of its modern comedies, dramas, and crime stories, but was dissolved the same year The Case of the Howling Dog came out.

== Home media ==
On October 23, 2012, Warner Home Video released the film on DVD in Region 1 via their Warner Archive Collection alongside The Case of the Curious Bride, The Case of the Lucky Legs, The Case of the Velvet Claws, The Case of the Black Cat and The Case of the Stuttering Bishop in a set entitled Perry Mason: The Original Warner Bros. Movies Collection. This is a manufacture-on-demand (MOD) release, originally available exclusively through Warner's online store and only in the United States, but as of 2013 available through Amazon, Barnes & Noble, and other on-line sources.
