= The Case of the Curious Bride =

1935 film by Michael Curtiz

- Lobby card
- Directed by: Michael Curtiz
- Written by: Tom Reed; Brown Holmes (add. dialogue)
- Based on: The Case of the Curious Bride; 1934 novel by Erle Stanley Gardner
- Produced by: Harry Joe Brown (uncredited)
- Starring: Warren William; Margaret Lindsay; Donald Woods; Claire Dodd
- Cinematography: David Abel
- Edited by: Terry Morse
- Music by: Bernhard Kaun
- Production company: First National Pictures
- Distributed by: Warner Bros. Pictures
- Release date: April 13, 1935
- Running time: 80 minutes
- Country: United States
- Language: English

The Case of the Curious Bride is a 1935 American mystery film, the second in a series of four starring Warren William as Perry Mason, following The Case of the Howling Dog. The script was based on the 1934 novel of the same name by Erle Stanley Gardner, published by William Morrow and Company, which proved to be one of the most popular of all the Perry Mason novels.

The film marked the American film debut of Errol Flynn. He appears twice, as a corpse and in flashback towards the end.

== Plot ==
Rhoda Montaine learns that her first husband, Gregory Moxley, is still alive, which makes things awkward for her, since she has remarried Carl, the son of wealthy C. Phillip Montaine. She turns to Perry Mason for help, but when he goes to see Moxley, he finds only his corpse. Rhoda is arrested for murder.

== Cast ==
- Warren William as Perry Mason
- Margaret Lindsay as Rhoda Montaine
- Donald Woods as Carl Montaine
- Claire Dodd as Della Street, Mason's secretary
- Allen Jenkins as Spudsy Drake, Mason's assistant
- Phillip Reed as Dr. Claude Millbeck
- Barton MacLane as Chief Detective Joe Lucas
- Wini Shaw as Doris Pender
- Warren Hymer as Oscar Pender
- Olin Howland as Coroner Wilbur Strong
- Charles Richman as C. Phillip Montaine
- Thomas E. Jackson as Toots Howard
- Robert Gleckler as Detective Byrd
- James Donlan as Detective Fritz
- Errol Flynn in his first-released American screen appearance, as Gregory Moxley
- Mayo Methot as Florabelle Lawson
- George Humbert as Luigi
- Henry Kolker as District Attorney Stacey

== Production ==
Warner Bros. Pictures announced they bought the film rights in May 1934. The same month they announced they had purchased the film rights to Captain Blood, which would star Errol Flynn. Warners had earlier bought the rights to Gardner's Case of the Howling Dog and announced they would make the two films with Warren William as Perry Mason, with plans for an additional four films. Alan Crosland was originally announced as director but the job eventually went to Michael Curtiz.

Filming started early 1935. Errol Flynn, described as an "Irish leading man of the London stage" was signed in February.

== Reception ==
The Chicago Daily Tribune praised the film's "laudable speed and suspense". The Los Angeles Times liked William's performance but thought his character "was almost too darn clever."

Filmink magazine said "The film is mostly worth seeing for the novelty of" Flynn's "American debut and seeing the serious-in-the-books-and-the-TV-series Perry Mason transmorphed into a wacky screwball hero."

== Home media ==
On October 23, 2012, Warner Home Video released the film on DVD in Region 1 via their Warner Archive Collection alongside The Case of the Howling Dog, The Case of the Lucky Legs, The Case of the Velvet Claws, The Case of the Black Cat and The Case of the Stuttering Bishop in a set entitled Perry Mason: The Original Warner Bros. Movies Collection. This is a manufacture-on-demand (MOD) release, available exclusively through Warner's online store and only in the United States.
