= The Case of the Stuttering Bishop =

1937 film

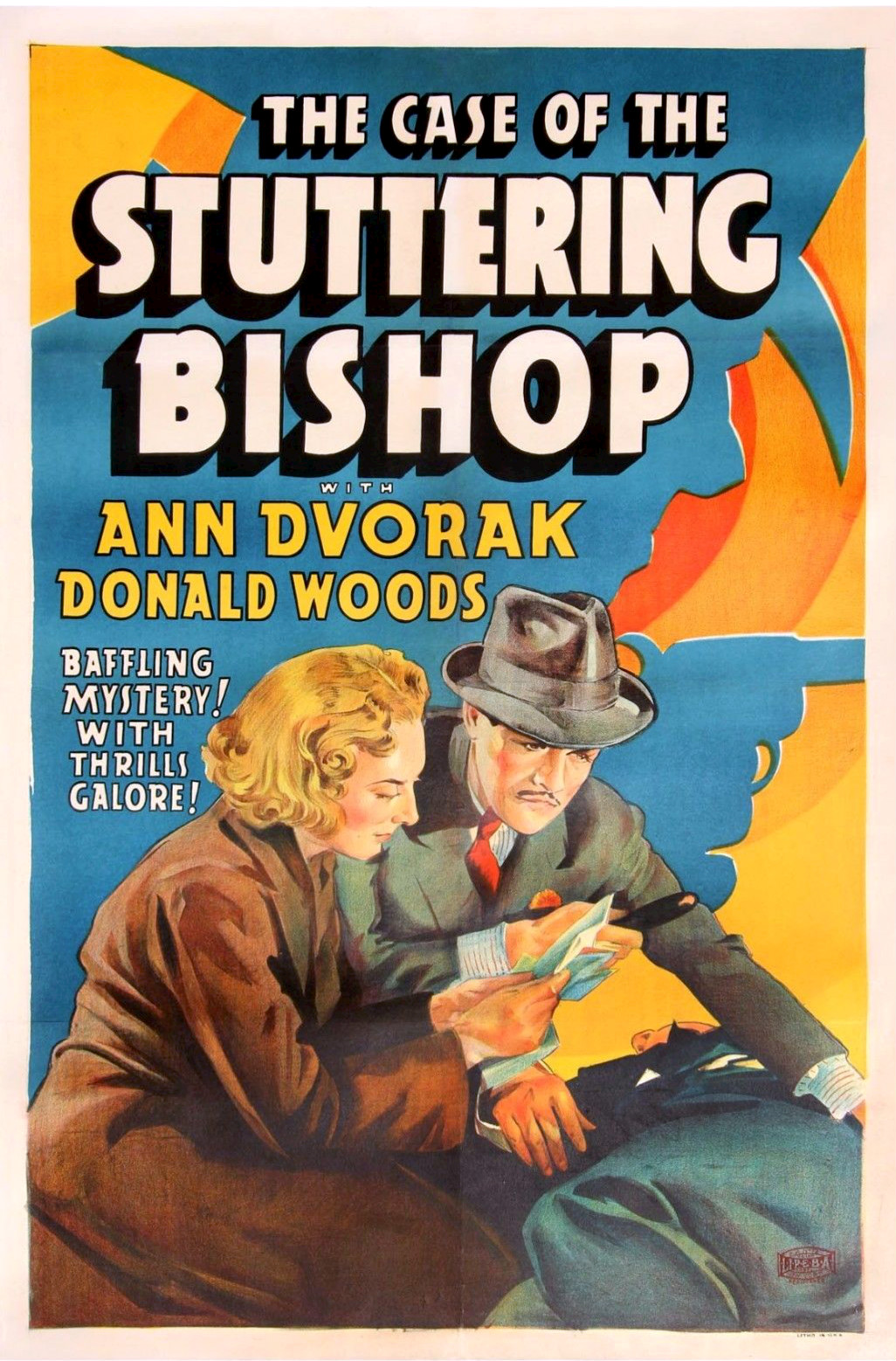
- Theatrical release poster
- Directed by: William Clemens
- Written by: Kenneth Gamet; Don Ryan
- Based on: The Case of the Stuttering Bishop by Erle Stanley Gardner
- Produced by: Bryan Foy
- Starring: Donald Woods; Ann Dvorak; Anne Nagel
- Cinematography: Rex Wimpy
- Edited by: Jack Saper
- Music by: Heinz Roemheld
- Production company: Warner Bros. Pictures
- Distributed by: Warner Bros. Pictures
- Release date: June 8, 1937
- Running time: 70 minutes
- Country: United States
- Language: English

The Case of the Stuttering Bishop is a 1937 American mystery film directed by William Clemens and starring Donald Woods as Perry Mason and Ann Dvorak as Della Street, his secretary. Edward McWade plays the role of stuttering Bishop William Mallory. It is the sixth and final film in the Warner Bros. Pictures Perry Mason series. It is based on the novel The Case of the Stuttering Bishop (1936), by Erle Stanley Gardner.

== Plot ==
Perry is asked by an Australian bishop to take the case of a woman who was falsely accused of manslaughter 22 years ago. During his investigations, Perry gets involved in another murder for which Ida, the woman he is supposed to free, gets arrested.

== Cast ==
- Donald Woods as Perry Mason
- Ann Dvorak as Della Street
- Anne Nagel as Janice Alma Brownley
- Linda Perry as Janice Seaton
- Craig Reynolds as Gordon Bixler
- Gordon Oliver as Philip Brownley
- Joseph Crehan as Paul Drake
- Helen MacKellar as Stella Kenwood (as Helen McKellar)
- Edward McWade as Bishop William Mallory
- Tom Kennedy as Jim Magooney
- Mira McKinney as Ida Gilbert
- Frank Faylen as Charlie Downs
- Douglas Wood as Renald C. Brownley
- Veda Ann Borg as Gladys
- George Lloyd as Peter Sacks
- Selmer Jackson as Victor Stockton
- Charles Wilson as Hamilton Burger

== Cultural references ==
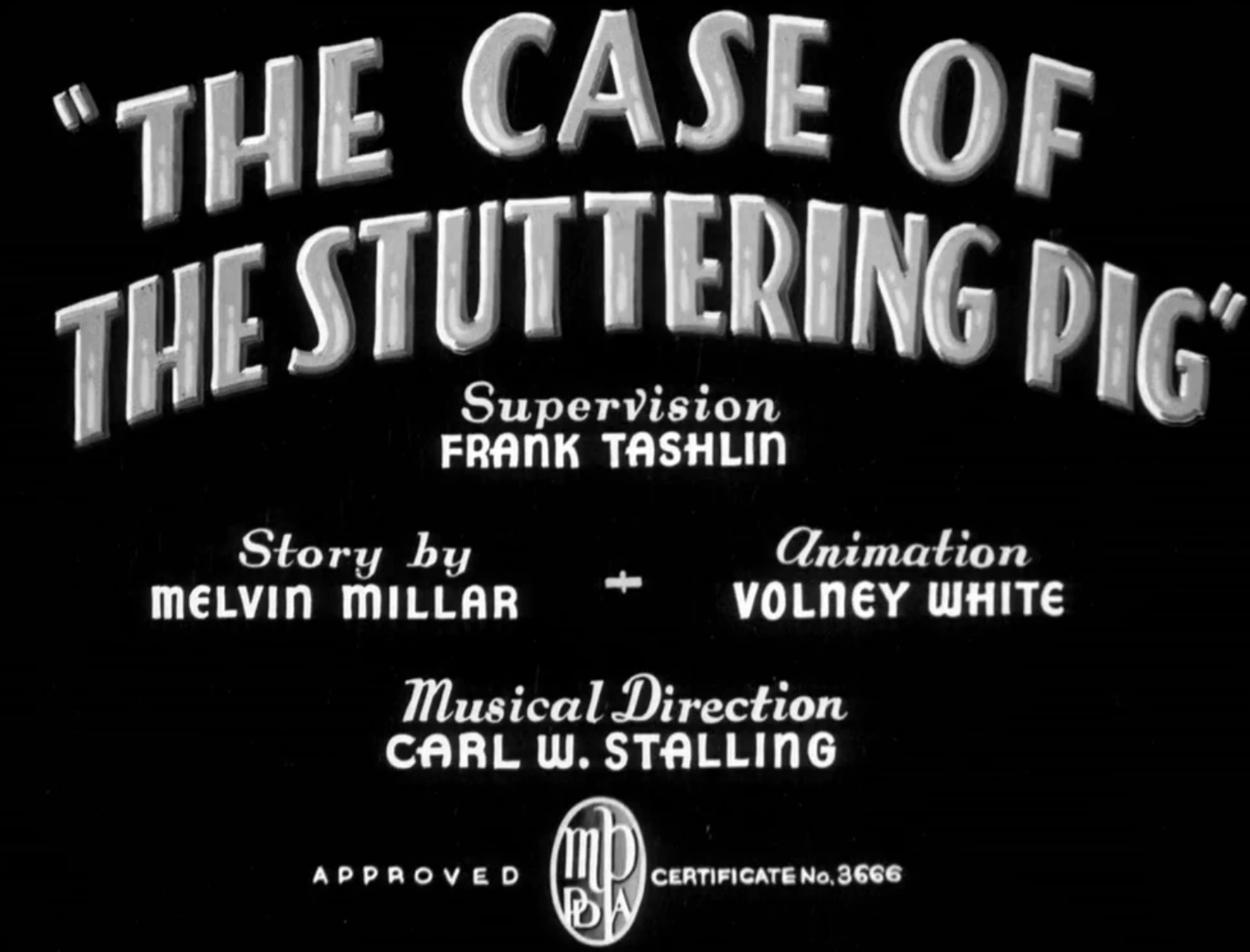
Intertitle for The Case of the Stuttering Pig

In September 1937, Warner Bros. produced the Looney Tunes cartoon, The Case of the Stuttering Pig, featuring Porky Pig. Although a lawyer figures in the story, the cartoon has no relationship to the Warner Bros. Perry Mason feature that inspired its clever title.

== Home media ==
On October 23, 2012, Warner Home Video released the film on DVD in Region 1 via their Warner Archive Collection alongside The Case of the Howling Dog, The Case of the Curious Bride, The Case of the Lucky Legs, The Case of the Velvet Claws and The Case of the Black Cat in a set entitled Perry Mason: The Original Warner Bros. Movies Collection. This is a manufacture-on-demand (MOD) release, available exclusively through Warner's online store and only in the United States.
