= The Case of the Velvet Claws =

1936 film by William Clemens

- Film poster
- Directed by: William Clemens
- Screenplay by: Tom Reed
- Based on: The Case of the Velvet Claws; 1933 novel by Erle Stanley Gardner
- Produced by: Henry Blanke (uncredited)
- Starring: Warren William; Claire Dodd; Wini Shaw
- Cinematography: Sidney Hickox
- Edited by: Jack Saper
- Music by: Bernhard Kaun; Heinz Roemheld
- Production company: First National Pictures
- Distributed by: Warner Bros. Pictures
- Release date: August 15, 1936
- Running time: 63 minutes
- Country: United States
- Language: English

The Case of the Velvet Claws is a 1936 American mystery film directed by William Clemens and starring Warren William, Claire Dodd and Wini Shaw. It is based on the first Perry Mason novel (1933) by Erle Stanley Gardner, and it features the fourth and final appearance of William as defense attorney Mason.

== Plot summary ==
Mason finally marries his longtime secretary Della Street, but has to cut their honeymoon short in order to defend a woman accused of murder.

== Cast ==
- Warren William as Perry Mason
- Claire Dodd as Della Street Mason
- Wini Shaw as Eva Belter (as Winifred Shaw)
- Bill Elliott as Carl Griffin (as Gordon Elliott)
- Joe King as George C. Belter (as Joseph King)
- Addison Richards as Frank Locke
- Eddie Acuff as Spudsy Drake
- Olin Howland as Wilbur Strong
- Dick Purcell as Crandal
- Kenneth Harlan as Peter Milnor
- Clara Blandick as Judge Mary F. O'Daugherty

== Home media ==
On October 23, 2012, Warner Home Video released the film on DVD in Region 1 via their Warner Archive Collection alongside The Case of the Howling Dog, The Case of the Curious Bride, The Case of the Lucky Legs, The Case of the Black Cat and The Case of the Stuttering Bishop in a set entitled Perry Mason: The Original Warner Bros. Movies Collection. This is a manufacture-on-demand (MOD) release, available exclusively through Warner's online store and only in the US. The box set can also be purchased through Amazon.com.
