= The Case of the Lucky Legs =

1935 film by Archie Mayo

- Theatrical release poster
- Directed by: Archie Mayo
- Written by: Jerome Chodorov (adaptation); Brown Holmes; Ben Markson
- Based on: The Case of the Lucky Legs; 1934 novel by Erle Stanley Gardner
- Produced by: Henry Blanke
- Starring: Warren William; Genevieve Tobin; Patricia Eills; Lyle Talbot
- Cinematography: Tony Gaudio
- Edited by: James Gibbon
- Music by: Leo F. Forbstein
- Distributed by: Warner Bros. Pictures
- Release date: October 5, 1935
- Running time: 77 minutes
- Country: United States
- Language: English

The Case of the Lucky Legs is a 1935 mystery film, the third in a series of Perry Mason films starring Warren William as the famed lawyer.

== Plot ==
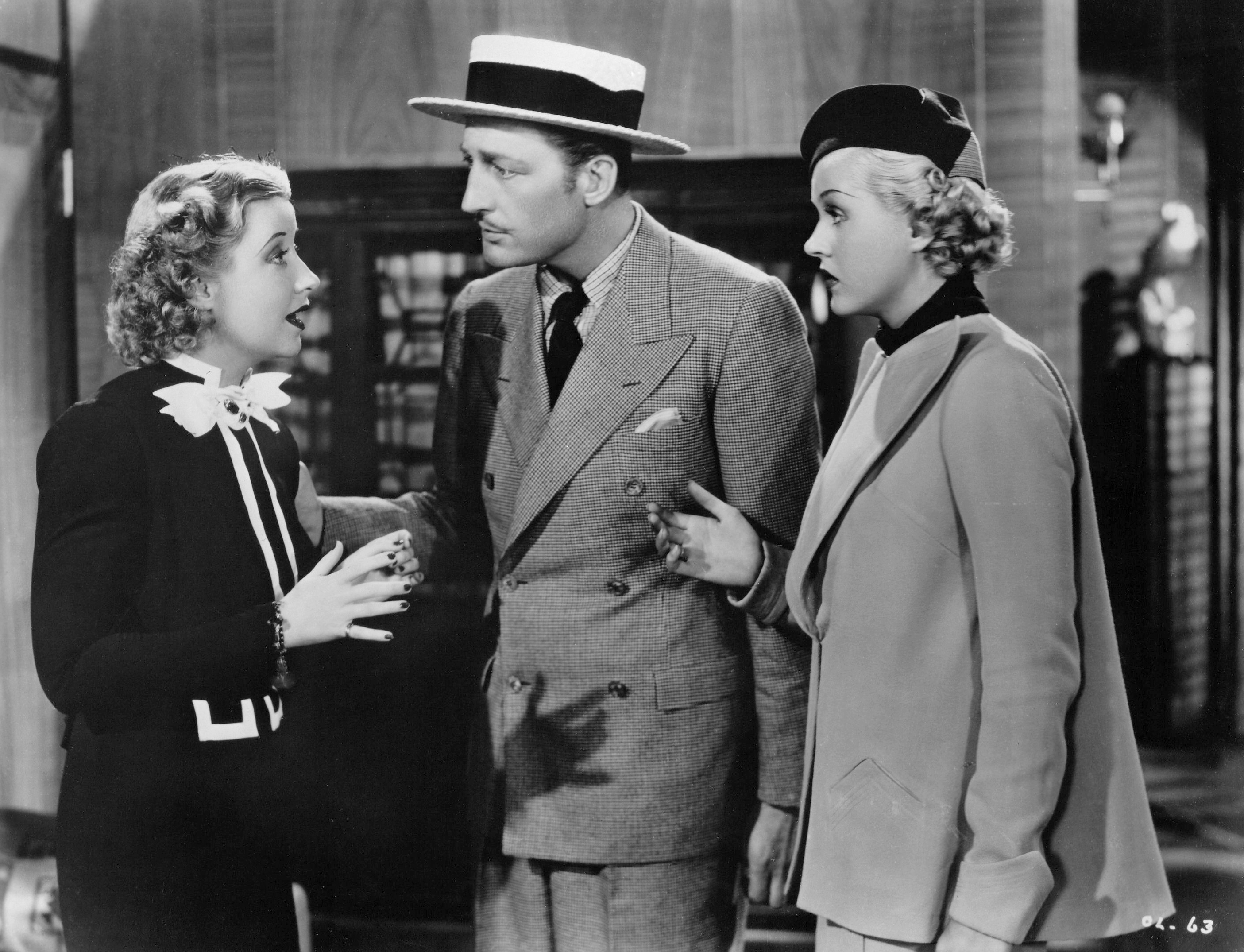
Genevieve Tobin, Warren William and Patricia Ellis in The Case of the Lucky Legs (1935)

Margie Clune wins the "Lucky Legs" beauty contest concocted by Frank Patton, but has trouble collecting her $1,000 prize when the promoter skips town. It turns out it is all a scam he has pulled before. When he later turns up stabbed to death, she is a strong suspect.

== Cast ==
- Warren William as Perry Mason
- Genevieve Tobin as Della Street
- Patricia Ellis as Margie Clune
- Lyle Talbot as Dr. Bob Doray
- Allen Jenkins as Spudsy Drake, Mason's private investigator
- Barton MacLane as Police Chief Bisonette
- Peggy Shannon as Thelma Bell
- Porter Hall as Bradbury
- Anita Kerry as Eva Lamont
- Craig Reynolds as Frank Patton
- Henry O'Neill as District Attorney Manchester
- Charles Wilson as Police Officer Ricker
- Joseph Crehan as Detective Johnson
- Olin Howland as Dr. Croker, Perry's doctor
- Mary Treen as Spudsy's wife

== Critical reception ==
Writing for The Spectator in 1936, Graham Greene praised the film as "an admirable film" sadly partnered as makeweight to I Give My Heart (a film Greene characterized as appalling). Comparing the character of Perry Mason to other similar fictional detectives like Sherlock Holmes, Lord Peter Wimsey, Charlie Chan, and those created by William Powell, Greene concludes that Mason is his favorite film detective because he is a more genuine creation and recommends the film as "good Mason if not good detection".

== Home media ==
On October 23, 2012, Warner Home Video released the film on DVD in Region 1 via their Warner Archive Collection alongside The Case of the Howling Dog, The Case of the Curious Bride, The Case of the Velvet Claws, The Case of the Black Cat and The Case of the Stuttering Bishop in a set entitled Perry Mason: The Original Warner Bros. Movies Collection. This is a manufacture-on-demand (MOD) release, available exclusively through Warner's online store and only in the United States.

"The Case of the Lucky Legs" was remade for the TV series Perry Mason starring Raymond Burr, Season three; episode 10, first shown December 19, 1959.
