= Hamilton Burger =

Fictional district attorney

- Perry Mason character
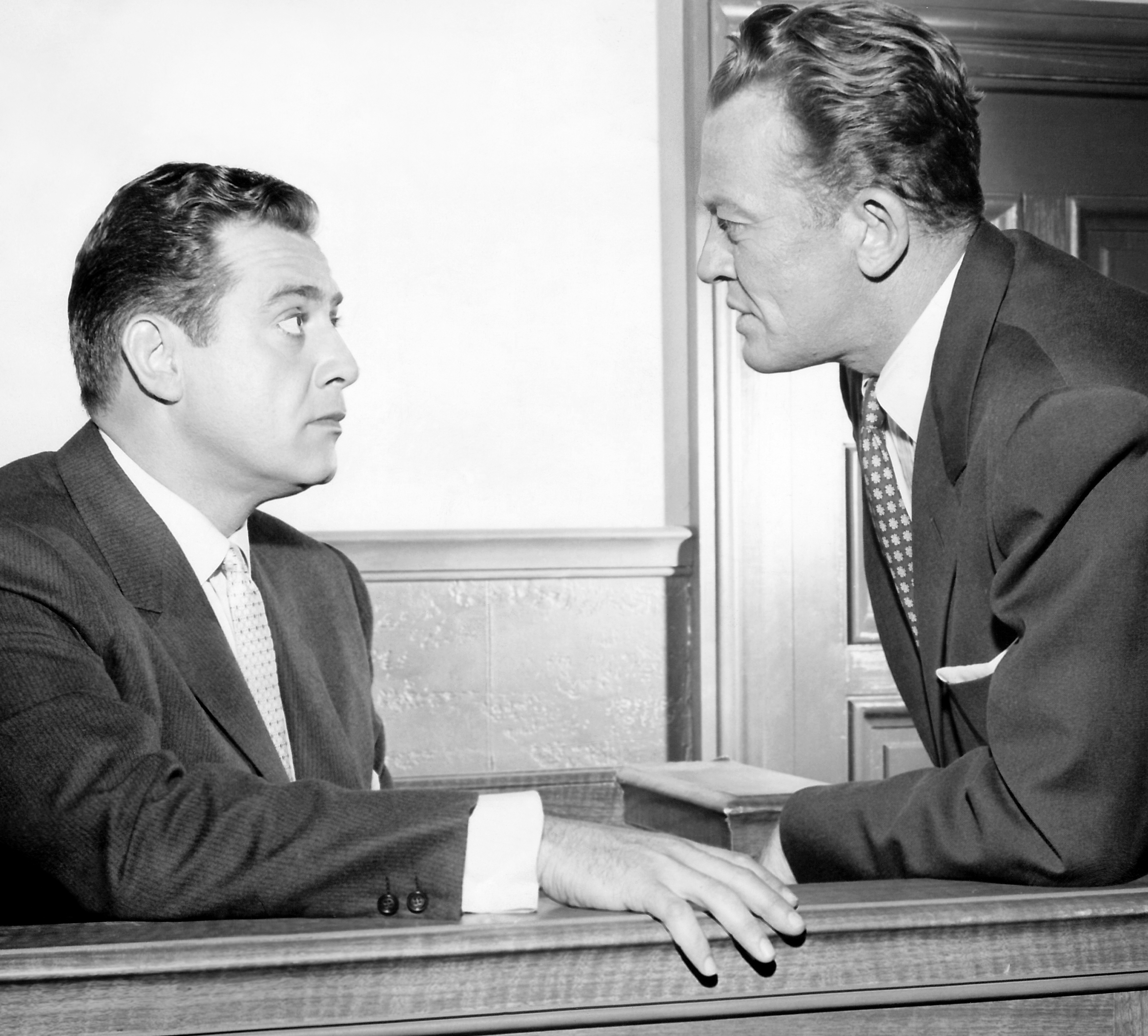
- William Talman (right) as Hamilton Burger, with Raymond Burr in the CBS-TV series Perry Mason (1957–66)
- First appearance: The Case of the Counterfeit Eye (1935)
- Created by: Erle Stanley Gardner
- Portrayed by: Guy Usher; Charles C. Wilson; William Talman; Harry Guardino; Justin Kirk

In-universe information
- Gender: Male
- Occupation: District Attorney
- Nationality: American

Hamilton Burger is the fictional Los Angeles County District Attorney (D.A.) in the series of novels, films, and radio and television programs featuring Perry Mason, the fictional defense attorney created by Erle Stanley Gardner.

== Character ==
Hamilton Burger first appears in chapter 10 of Gardner's 1935 novel, The Case of the Counterfeit Eye, in which he is described as "a broad-shouldered, thick-necked individual with a close-cropped moustache". Gardner describes Burger in the cast of characters of that novel as an "honest but stubborn" D.A. In chapter 15 of The Case of the Caretaker's Cat (1935), Burger's residential address is given as 3297 West Lakeside, and his phone number is EXposition 9–6949.

Burger is one of literature's least successful district attorneys, and critics have suggested that he must have been the most incompetent lawyer in history, although his record against defense attorneys other than Mason is unknown. He inevitably prosecutes the wrong person – Mason's client – whom Mason exonerates, while revealing the true culprit, through dramatic and even spectacular courtroom tactics.

Burger's bag of tricks was comparatively empty, chiefly comprising expressions of exasperation at whatever Mason was doing. Once Mason had exposed the true perpetrator, Burger often joined in Mason's motion to dismiss the charges against Mason's client so that Burger could then charge the actual wrongdoer.

== In film ==
Hamilton Burger appeared in the fifth installment of the Warner Bros. Perry Mason movie series of the 1930s, The Case of the Black Cat. He was portrayed by Guy Usher. The character, now portrayed by Charles C. Wilson, played a larger role in the sixth and final film in the series, The Case of the Stuttering Bishop.

== Television portrayal ==
=== Perry Mason ===
Burger was portrayed by William Talman in the long-running CBS-TV series Perry Mason (1957–66). Asked how he felt about Burger losing to Mason week after week, Talman said, "Burger doesn't lose. How can a district attorney lose when he fails to convict an innocent person? Unlike a fist or gun fight, in court you can have a winner without having a loser. As a matter of fact Burger in a good many instances has joined Mason in action against unethical attorneys, lying witnesses, or any one else obstructing justice. Like any real-life district attorney, justice is Burger's main interest."

Burger did defeat Mason twice on the television series: in "The Case of the Terrified Typist" (episode 1-38), and in "The Case of the Deadly Verdict" (episode 7–4), a much-publicized episode that begins with Mason's client being sentenced to death.

The character of Hamilton Burger temporarily disappeared from the TV series during the series' third season. Talman was fired by CBS March 18, 1960, hours after he entered a not-guilty plea to misdemeanor charges related to his presence at a party that was raided by police. The schedule was immediately juggled to minimize Talman's presence on the show. "The Case of the Crying Cherub" (episode 3-20) debuts a pared-down title sequence that omits Talman; he is credited only in the four episodes he filmed before he was fired. Talman was defended by the show's executive producer Gail Patrick Jackson, Raymond Burr, and others, but even dismissal of the charges in June did not soften the network's position. Patrick said that the role of Burger would not be recast, but that various actors would play assistant district attorneys. CBS reinstated Talman only after Gardner himself spoke out, along with Raymond Burr, the star of the show, and millions of viewers who wrote to CBS asking for Talman to return. Talman went back to work in December 1960, and Burger returned in "The Case of the Fickle Fortune" (episode 4.15).

=== The New Perry Mason ===
In the short-lived CBS-TV series, The New Perry Mason (1973–74), Burger was played by Harry Guardino.

=== Perry Mason television films ===
Talman had died by the time of the Perry Mason television movies of the 1980s and 1990s, but his character was referenced in the first of the series, Perry Mason Returns. In it, a cocky young deputy prosecutor describes her case against Mason's client as a "dead-bang winner," to which the district attorney replies, "You know how many times Hamilton Burger said that?"

=== HBO's Perry Mason ===
In the HBO series, Perry Mason (2020), assistant district attorney Burger was a graduate of Yale Law with 22 years of trial experience, played by Justin Kirk. This series takes place 1931–1932, before Mason becomes a defense attorney. The adversary is district attorney Maynard Barnes, a character created for the series, played by Stephen Root. Burger, meanwhile, is depicted as helping Mason study for the bar exam. Mason believes, as does Della Street, that Burger is helping mainly so that he can run for DA when Barnes is humiliated by losing the high-profile case, but he does not himself confirm this. In the series, he is depicted as a closeted gay man who keeps up his facade by making public appearances with Della, who is herself a lesbian.

== Influence ==
In her confirmation hearings before the Senate Judiciary Committee in July 2009, Supreme Court nominee Sonia Sotomayor prefaced her remarks on the role of the prosecutor by claiming that she was inspired by watching Perry Mason as a child, explaining, "I was influenced so greatly by a television show in igniting the passion that I had as being a prosecutor, and it was Perry Mason. In her 2013 memoir, Sotomayor, now a Supreme Court justice, wrote of the show's influence on her while she was growing up in a Bronx housing project. (Note: Nina Totenberg's NPR story on Sonia Sotomayor uses an excerpt from "The Case of the Prodigal Parent" (episode 1-36).) Sotomayor granted that the defense attorney was the show's hero, "but my sympathies were not entirely monopolized by Perry Mason. I was fond of Burger, the prosecutor, too. I liked that he was a good loser, that he was more committed to finding the truth than to winning his case. If the defendant was truly innocent, he once explained, and the case was dismissed, then he had done his job because justice had been served."
