= Mississippi Gambler (film) =

1942 film

- Theatrical release poster
- Directed by: John Rawlins
- Screenplay by: Al Martin; Roy Chanslor
- Story by: Al Martin; Marion Orth
- Produced by: Paul Malvern
- Starring: Kent Taylor; Frances Langford; John Litel; Shemp Howard; Claire Dodd; Wade Boteler
- Cinematography: John W. Boyle
- Edited by: Arthur Hilton
- Music by: Score: Frank Skinner; Songs: Jimmy McHugh (music); Harold Adamson (lyrics)
- Production company: Universal Pictures
- Distributed by: Universal Pictures
- Release date: April 17, 1942
- Running time: 60 minutes
- Country: United States
- Language: English

Mississippi Gambler is a 1942 American crime film directed by John Rawlins and written by Al Martin and Roy Chanslor. The film stars Kent Taylor, Frances Langford, John Litel, Shemp Howard, Claire Dodd and Wade Boteler. The film was released on April 17, 1942, by Universal Pictures.

== Cast ==
- Kent Taylor as Johnny Forbes
- Frances Langford as Beth Cornell
- John Litel as Jim Hadley aka Francis Carvel
- Shemp Howard as Milton Davis
- Claire Dodd as Gladys La Verne
- Wade Boteler as Eric Brandon
- Douglas Fowley as Chet Matthews
- Aldrich Bowker as Judd Higgins
- Eddie Dunn as Dexter
- Harry Hayden as Sheriff Dan Calkins
- David Oliver as Croupier
- Eddie Acuff as Everett
- Paul Phillips as Sid
- George H. Reed as Roy
- Alexander Lockwood as Spence
- Robert Barron as Bert
