= Perry Mason =

Fictional attorney

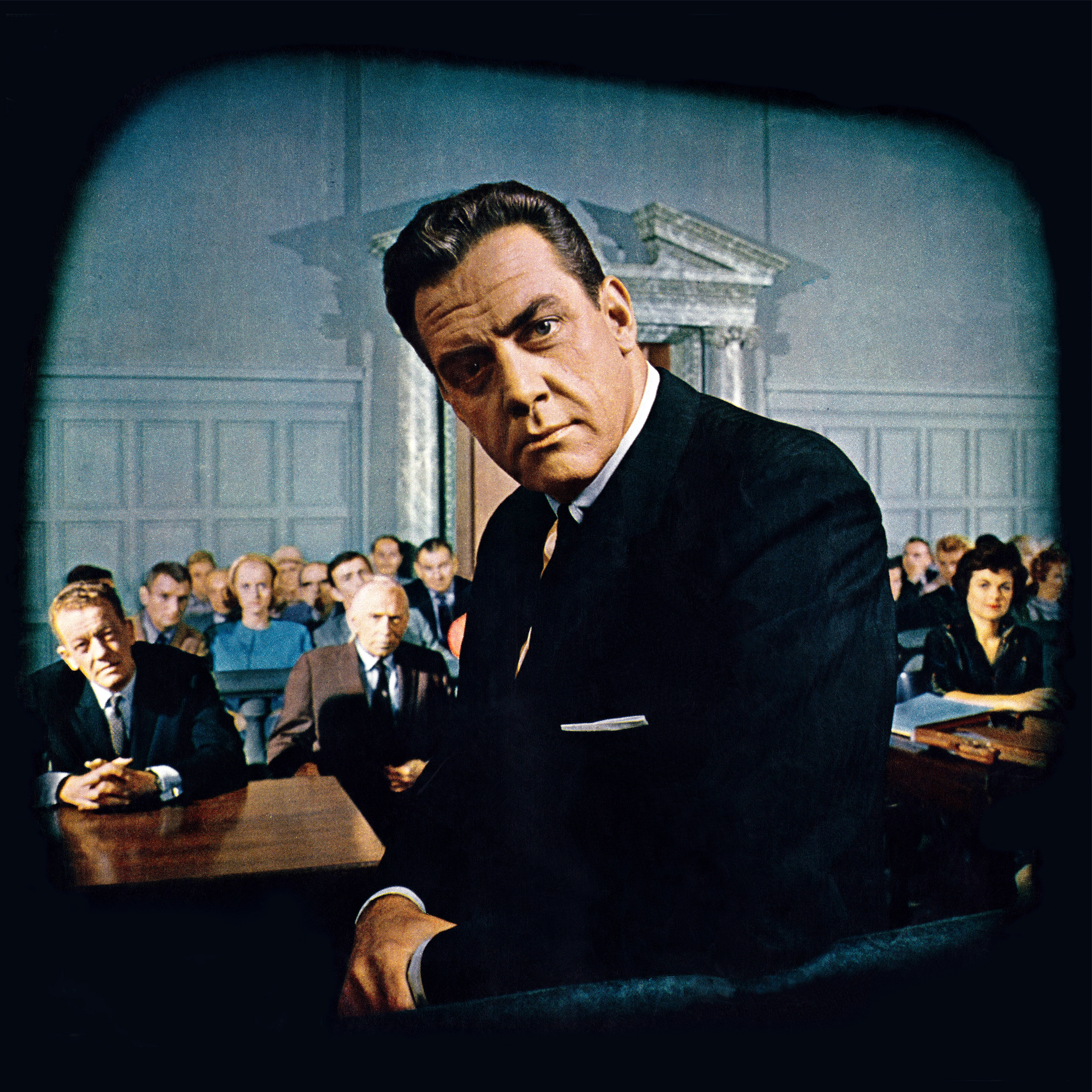
- Raymond Burr as Perry Mason in the CBS-TV series Perry Mason, from the cover of Look magazine for October 10, 1961
- First appearance: The Case of the Velvet Claws (1933)
- Created by: Erle Stanley Gardner
- Portrayed by: Warren William; Ricardo Cortez; Donald Woods; Bartlett Robinson; Santos Ortega; Donald Briggs; John Larkin; Raymond Burr; Monte Markham; Matthew Rhys

In-universe information
- Occupation: Lawyer
- Nationality: American

Perry Mason is a fictional American criminal defense lawyer who is the main character in the detective fiction written by Erle Stanley Gardner. Perry Mason appears in 82 novels and four short stories, all involving a client charged with murder, usually centered on a preliminary hearing or jury trial. Mason typically establishes his client's innocence by finding the real murderer. The character was inspired by Los Angeles criminal defense attorney Earl Rogers.

Perry Mason was adapted for motion pictures and a long-running radio series. These were followed by the best-known adaptation, the CBS television series Perry Mason (1957–1966), starring Raymond Burr. A second television series, The New Perry Mason starring Monte Markham, ran from 1973 to 1974. Thirty Perry Mason television films aired from 1985 to 1995, with Burr reprising the role in 26 of them up to his death in 1993. A third television series, HBO's Perry Mason, starring Matthew Rhys, aired from 2020 to 2023.

The Perry Mason series ranks third in the top ten best-selling book series. In 2015, the American Bar Association's publishing imprint, Ankerwycke, began reissuing Gardner's Perry Mason books, which had been out of print in the United States.

== Character ==
As a child, Gardner read the magazine Youth's Companion, published by the Perry Mason Company, a name he later borrowed for his fictional attorney. Gardner provided more information about Mason's character in earlier novels, while knowledge of his character is largely taken for granted in the later works, the television series, and films. In the first novel (The Case of the Velvet Claws, 1933), Mason describes himself:

"You'll find that I'm a lawyer who has specialized in trial work, and in a lot of criminal work...I'm a specialist on getting people out of trouble. They come to me when they're in all sorts of trouble, and I work them out ... If you look me up through some family lawyer or some corporation lawyer, he'll probably tell you that I'm a shyster. If you look me up through some chap in the District Attorney's office, he'll tell you that I'm a dangerous antagonist but he doesn't know very much about me."

Gardner depicts Mason as a relentless attorney attracted to complex, unconventional cases that appear unwinnable. He frequently accepts clients on a whim, driven by curiosity about their problems, for a minimal retainer, and finances the case investigations himself when necessary. In The Case of the Caretaker's Cat (1935), his principal antagonist, District Attorney Hamilton Burger, says:

"You're a better detective than you are a lawyer. When you turn your mind to the solution of a crime, you ferret out the truth."

In The Case of the Moth-Eaten Mink (1952), a judge who witnesses one of Mason's unusual tactics says:

"Mr. Mason...from time to time you seem to find yourself in predicaments from which you extricate yourself by unusual methods which invariably turn out to be legally sound. The Court feels you are fully capable of looking after your own as well as your clients' interests."

Another frequent antagonist, Lieutenant Arthur Tragg of the homicide squad, has a discussion with Mason about his approach to the law. Mason is recovering from poisoning, and Tragg is investigating. In The Case of the Drowsy Mosquito (1943), he says:

"How does it feel to be the victim for once? … You've been sticking up for criminals and now you can see the other side of the picture."
"Not 'sticking up for criminals,'" Mason protested indignantly. "I have never stuck up for any criminal. I have merely asked for the orderly administration of an impartial justice ... Due legal process is my own safeguard against being convicted unjustly. To my mind, that's government. That's law and order."

Beyond what is presented in the novels, little is known about Perry Mason. His family, personal life, background, and education are not depicted. In the first chapter of The Case of the Sleepwalker's Niece (1935), his astrological sign is given as Leo. Mason has a professional relationship with Paul Drake. Della Street is Mason's only evident, though not sharply delineated, romantic interest. He is shown to live in an apartment, as he is occasionally awakened to go to his office; he does not entertain guests at home. His tastes in food are shown in restaurant scenes, and he is depicted as an excellent driver through occasional car chases. Beyond these limited details, there is little physical description of Mason.

The 1930s films were not closely based on the character as portrayed in the books and include plot and character developments not considered canonical in later works and adaptations. For instance, in one film, Mason marries his longtime secretary Della Street, while Paul Drake turns into comic sidekick Spudsy Drake.

Likewise, the television series diverges significantly from the books, which was a practical necessity considering that there were only about 80 Perry Mason novels written altogether and over 270 episodes of the TV series. Thus, there was a need for a great deal of invented material, including background, plots, and characters—none of which Gardner incorporated into his ongoing series of novels. Gardner wrote more than 30 additional Perry Mason novels between 1957, when the television series began, and his death in 1970.

The television series contains some hints of what Mason did in the past. In The Case of the Misguided Missile, Mason states that he served in the Navy on Ulithi atoll during World War II. In The Case of the Travelling Treasure, he states that he served aboard a minesweeper. In The Case of the Bluffing Blast, he states that he was on the deck of a destroyer in the Pacific when the engine room exploded.

The HBO series presents him as a private detective who becomes a lawyer to salvage the case he is working on. In this series, he lives on what remains of a dairy farm which has been in his family for at least two prior generations. He is also a veteran of World War I, having been discharged with a "blue ticket" (i.e. with negative connotations), after reportedly mercy-killing comrades who were severely wounded in a poison gas attack and unable to escape. In the first episode, Mason is shown with a tattoo of the Cross of Lorraine with the number 79 and the inscription "infantry", indicating he was an infantryman in the 79th Division whose emblem of the cross signifies its service in France during the war. Mason is also an alcoholic, divorced father who is struggling to maintain ownership of his deceased parents' farm.

== Novels ==
Julian Symons noted that Erle Stanley Gardner "had spent more than twenty years practicing law in California, and the knowledge he gained was put to good use in the Perry Mason stories, which hinge on points of law, forensic medicine, or science as clever as a watch mechanism … and also the total lack of characterization".

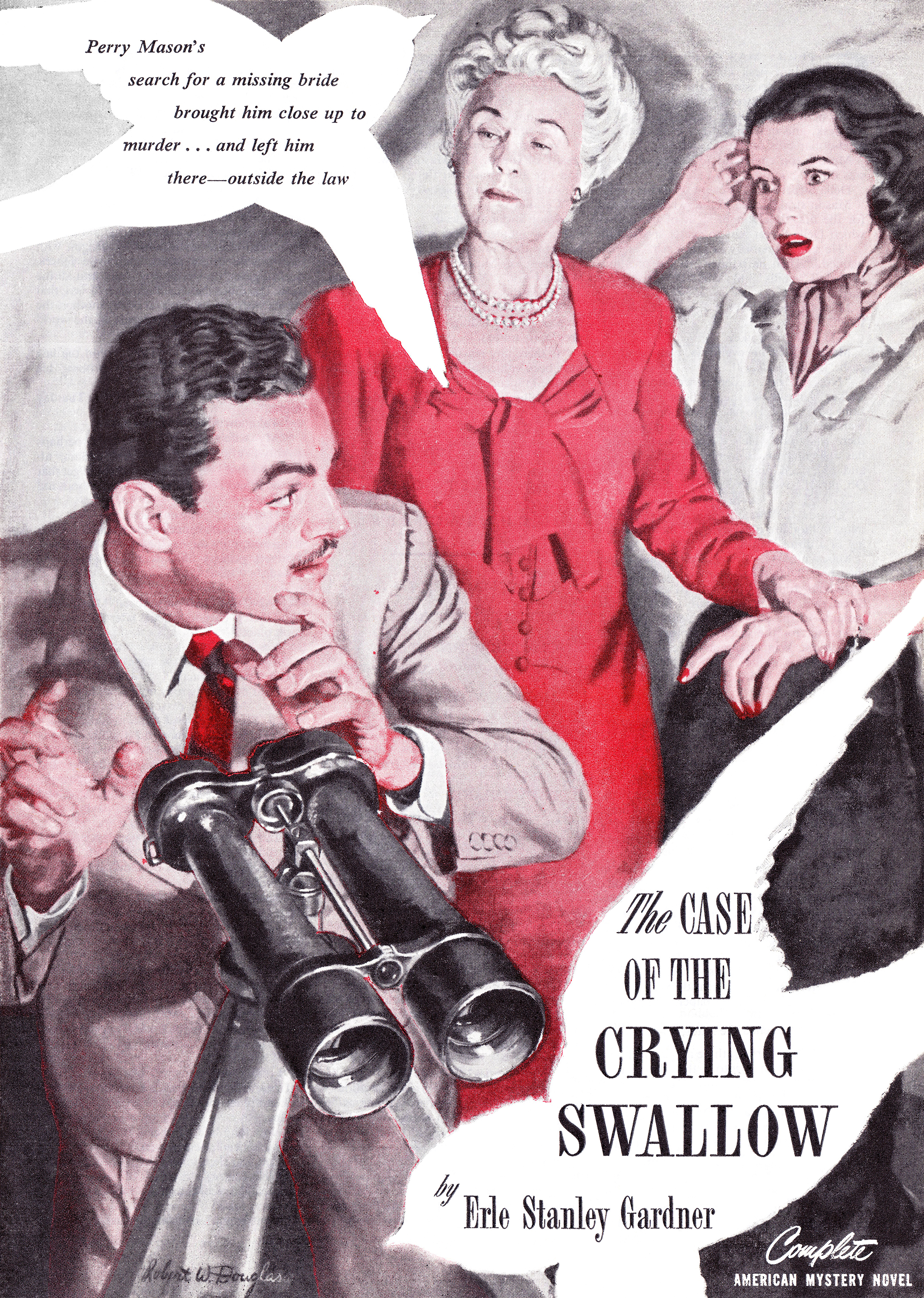
Robert W. Douglass illustrated "The Case of the Crying Swallow" for the August 1947 issue of The American Magazine

While the Mason novels were largely a form of pulp fiction that began Gardner's writing career, they are unusual in that the whodunit mysteries typically present two solutions: a plausible but incorrect one believed by authorities, in which Mason's client appears guilty, and an alternative explanation in which the client is innocent and another party committed the crime. In most cases, the second half of each novel is devoted to a courtroom scene in which Mason presents the alternative explanation and proves it to the court. "It is perfectly true that our author works to formula; in one sense, the plot never varies," wrote Jacques Barzun. "Having said this, one must add that the variety of persons and circumstances and the ingenuity in contriving the details that Gardner dreamed up in his dozens of cases are astonishing and entrancing."

A hallmark of the stories is that once Mason, assisted by his secretary Della Street and private investigator Paul Drake, accepts a case, he manipulates the evidence using unusual, sometimes bizarre tactics to mislead the police—though, except in the earliest novels, he does so within ethical bounds:

It's my contention, Della, that an attorney doesn't have to sit back and wait until a witness gets on the stand and then test his recollection simply by asking him questions. If facts can be shuffled in such a way that it will confuse a witness who isn't absolutely certain of his story, and if the attorney doesn't suppress, conceal, or distort any of the actual evidence, I claim the attorney is within his rights.

— Erle Stanley Gardner, The Case of the Long-Legged Models (1958)

The influence of the television series has given the general public the impression that Mason is highly ethical. In the earliest novels, however, Mason was not above using questionable tactics to win a case. In The Case of the Counterfeit Eye (1935), he breaks the law several times, including manufacturing false evidence (glass eyes). Mason manipulates evidence and witnesses, resulting in the acquittal of the murderer in The Case of the Howling Dog (1934). The Case of the Curious Bride (1934) is

… a good Perry Mason except for one great flaw, which the author would scarcely have been guilty of later on: he tampers with the evidence, by having a friend move into an apartment and testify to the state of the doorbells. … One is left with the uncomfortable idea that maybe the murder did not take place as Mason reconstructs it.

— Jacques Barzun and Wendell Hertig Taylor, A Catalogue of Crime

In the later novels, the only crime which he appears to commit is illegal entry while he and Paul Drake search for evidence. Even then, he would expect to mount defense leading to an acquittal. Hamilton Burger is constantly under the impression that Mason has done something illegal, but is never able to prove it. Gardner prefaced many of his later novels with tributes to coroners and forensic pathologists whose work was instrumental to solving cases. Gardner inserts his ideas about the importance of proper autopsies into many of his Mason novels. In The Case of the Fugitive Nurse, for example, dental records play a key role in identifying burned bodies. In that same story, the possible use of additives to track illegal resale of medical narcotics is examined.

Critic Russel B. Nye identified a pattern in Gardner's novels, describing them as formal as Japanese Noh drama. He described fairly rigid plot points:

- Attorney Perry Mason's case is introduced.
- Mason and his crew investigate.
- Mason's client is accused of a crime.
- Further investigations ensue.
- The trial begins.
- In a courtroom coup, Mason introduces new evidence and often elicits a confession from the lawbreaker.

The Perry Mason series ranks third among the best-selling book series, with sales of 300 million.

In June 2015, the American Bar Association announced that its new publishing imprint, Ankerwycke, would reissue Gardner's Perry Mason novels. The Case of the Velvet Claws, The Case of the Sulky Girl, The Case of the Lucky Legs, The Case of the Howling Dog and The Case of the Curious Bride were the first five novels announced for trade paperback release. The Perry Mason books had been out of print in the United States.

== Adaptations ==
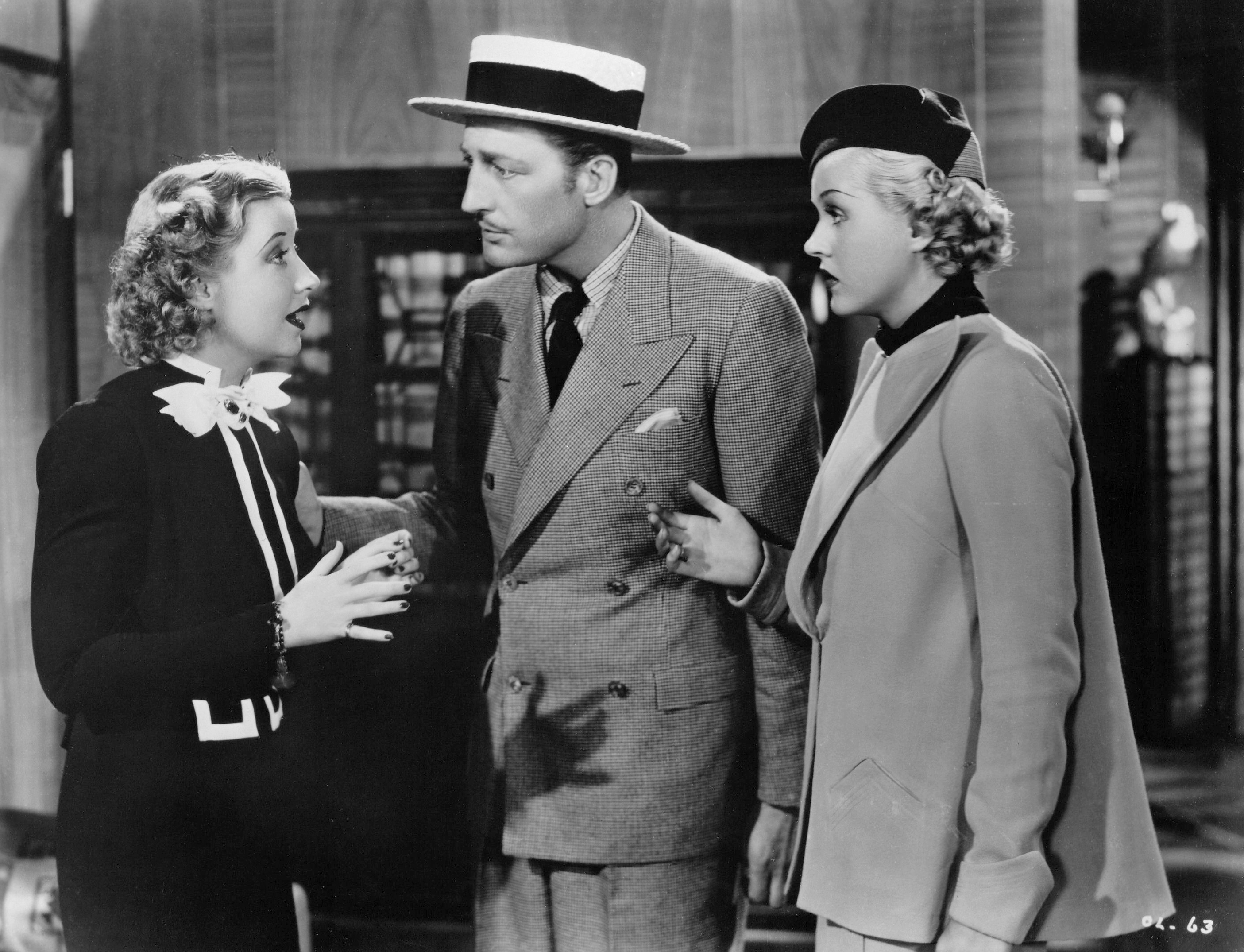
Warren William as Perry Mason in The Case of the Lucky Legs (1935), with Genevieve Tobin and Patricia Ellis

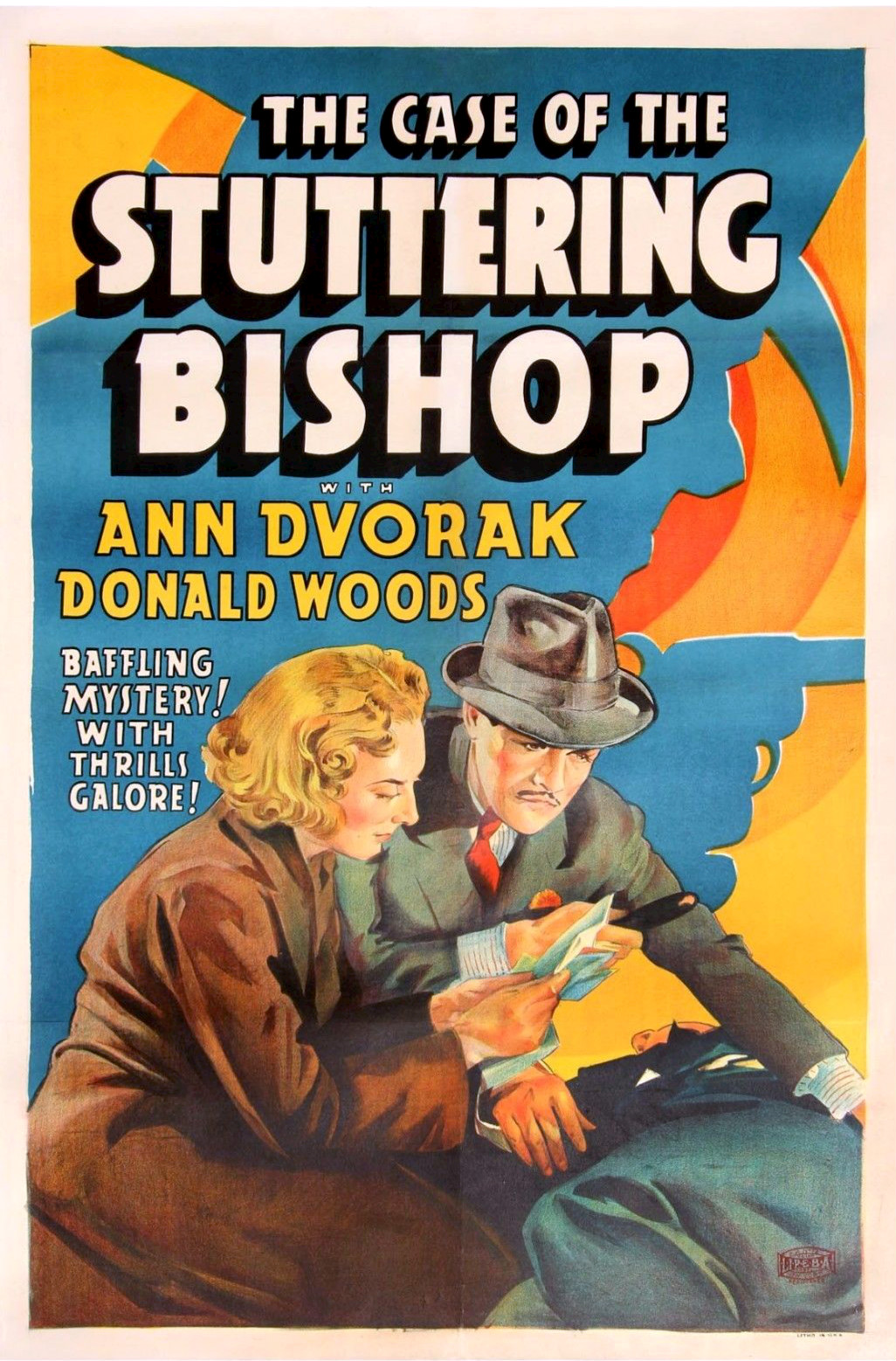
Donald Woods portrayed Perry Mason in The Case of the Stuttering Bishop (1937)

=== Film ===
Warner Bros. Pictures released a series of six Perry Mason films in the 1930s.

- The Case of the Howling Dog (1934), with Warren William as Perry Mason and Helen Trenholme as Della Street.
- The Case of the Curious Bride (1935), with Warren William and Claire Dodd as Della Street. Notable for the first-released American screen appearance of Errol Flynn as the corpse, who is seen alive but not speaking in a brief flashback.
- The Case of the Lucky Legs (1935), with Warren William and Genevieve Tobin as Della Street.
- The Case of the Velvet Claws (1936), with Warren William and Claire Dodd as Della Street Mason.
- The Case of the Black Cat (1936) (from The Case of the Caretaker's Cat [1935]), with Ricardo Cortez as Perry Mason and June Travis as Della Street.
- The Case of the Stuttering Bishop (1937), with Donald Woods as Perry Mason and Ann Dvorak as Della Street.

The six Perry Mason films are available on DVD as a single-set release from the Warner Archive Collection.

The 1940 Warner Bros. film, Granny Get Your Gun, was loosely based on the 1937 Perry Mason novel The Case of the Dangerous Dowager. May Robson stars as Minerva Hatton. The film does not include Perry Mason or any of the regular characters.

=== Radio ===
Perry Mason was adapted for radio as a 15-minute daily crime series that aired from 1943 to 1955 on CBS Radio. It had little in common with the usual portrayal of Mason, leading Gardner to withdraw his support for a television version of the daytime serial that began airing on CBS in 1956. The general theme of the radio series was continued under a different title and with different characters as The Edge of Night.

For much of the run, Mason was voiced by John Larkin, who later made multiple guest appearances on the Raymond Burr series.

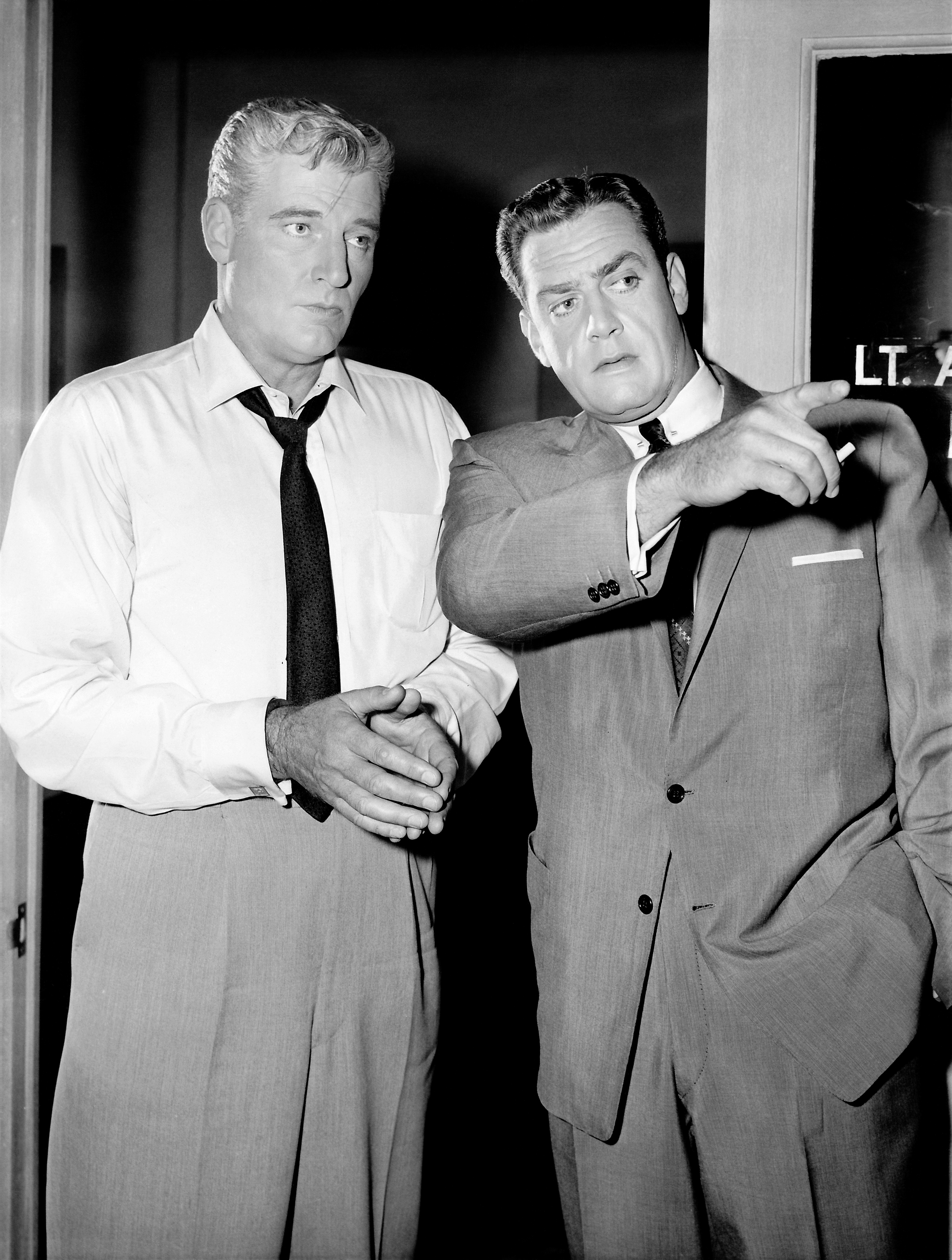
William Hopper and Raymond Burr in the CBS-TV series Perry Mason (1957–1966)

=== TV ===
==== Perry Mason (1957–1966) ====
The best-known incarnation of Perry Mason is the CBS series, which ran from 1957 to 1966 and starred Raymond Burr in the title role. The series also featured Barbara Hale as Della Street, William Hopper as Paul Drake, William Talman as Hamilton Burger, and Ray Collins as Lt. Tragg. The entire series has been released on DVD, and reruns are a staple in syndication.

Paramount+ has made available most of the episodes from seasons 1, 2, 3, 4, 5, 7, and 8 on its website for streaming.

==== The New Perry Mason (1973–1974) ====
Several years after Perry Mason was cancelled, a new series, The New Perry Mason, aired in 1973, featuring Monte Markham in the title role. A total of 15 episodes aired before being cancelled halfway through its first season.

==== Television films (1985–1995) ====
American television producers Dean Hargrove and Fred Silverman resurrected the Perry Mason character in a series of television films for NBC beginning in 1985. The two surviving stars of the CBS-TV series, Raymond Burr and Barbara Hale, reprised their roles as Mason and Della Street. In the first telefilm, Perry Mason Returns, Mason is an appellate court judge who resigns to defend his secretary Della against murder charges. William Katt, Hale's son, was cast as Paul Drake, Jr. William Hopper, who played private investigator Paul Drake in the original TV series, had died years earlier; Hopper's photograph appears on Paul Drake Jr.'s desk. In the later television films, Mason works with attorney Ken Malansky, played by William R. Moses.

The Perry Mason series of TV movies continued until Burr's death from kidney cancer in 1993. The Case of the Killer Kiss was Burr's final portrayal of Mason. The film aired after his death and was dedicated to Burr's memory. Thereafter, the series was retitled A Perry Mason Mystery and starred either Paul Sorvino or Hal Holbrook as lawyers and friends of Mason. Hale and Moses continued in their roles; Mason was ostensibly out of town.

==== Perry Mason (2020) ====
In August 2016, HBO announced a potential new series. In August 2017, a change in the writing staff for the project was announced, with Rolin Jones and Ron Fitzgerald taking over for Nic Pizzolatto. In January 2019, Robert Downey Jr. announced on Twitter that Matthew Rhys would be portraying Perry Mason in the new production; Downey was originally going to portray Mason, but withdrew due to scheduling conflicts. The HBO revival and reboot adapted its setting to Great Depression-era Los Angeles, some twenty years earlier than the CBS show (but in line with the earliest novels by Gardner). It features John Lithgow and Tatiana Maslany in additional roles. This miniseries had a budget of about $74.3 million and premiered on June 21, 2020. In July 2020, HBO announced that the miniseries had been picked up for a second season, and that the show would become a regular series.

=== Other adaptations ===
The Perry Mason character has appeared in comic books and a short-lived (October 16, 1950 – June 21, 1952) comic strip. He was also the inspiration for The Whole Truth (1986) by James Cummins, a book-length collection of sestinas.

In 2008, The Colonial Radio Theatre on the Air began producing a series of full-cast audio theater dramatizations of Gardner's Perry Mason novels, adapted by M. J. Elliott.

== Regular characters ==
Recurring characters in the Perry Mason stories include the following:

- Perry Mason: Los Angeles attorney introduced in the 1933 novel, The Case of the Velvet Claws.
- Della Street: Mason's confidential secretary introduced in the 1933 novel, The Case of the Velvet Claws.
- Paul Drake: Private investigator introduced in the 1933 novel, The Case of the Velvet Claws.
- Hamilton Burger: District attorney introduced in the 1935 novel, The Case of the Counterfeit Eye.
- Lt. Arthur Tragg: Police homicide investigator introduced in the 1940 novel, The Case of the Silent Partner.
- Gertie Lade: Mason's switchboard operator, an "incurable romantic" introduced in the 1939 novel, The Case of the Rolling Bones, and occasionally appearing in the CBS-TV series.
- Sergeant Holcomb: Homicide detective often featured in the early novels, but in only two episodes of the CBS-TV series. Holcomb in the novels is portrayed as a mean, derby-wearing, cigar-smoking thug. In at least one novel, it is implied that Paul Drake has beaten him in a fistfight before, and is quite willing to do so again, making Holcomb tread carefully around him.
- Carl Jackson: Law clerk in Mason's law firm, appearing in the novels and a few episodes of the CBS-TV series Perry Mason. (Note: See Chapter 1 of The Case of the Caretaker's Cat: "Perry Mason criminal lawyer, frowned at Carl Jackson, one of his assistants." See also Chapter 3 of The Case of Negligent Nymph: "'Well,' Della Street said, 'that's one consolation. Her beauty will be utterly wasted on Carl Jackson.'")
- David Gideon: Young legal assistant working with Mason in nine episodes of the CBS-TV series.
- Lt. Andy Anderson: Police homicide investigator in the CBS-TV series.
- Lt. Steve Drumm: Police homicide investigator in the CBS-TV series.
- Terrance Clay: Restaurateur and friend of Mason in the CBS-TV series.
- Paul Drake, Jr.: Paul Drake's son, also a private investigator, in the first nine Perry Mason television films.
- Ken Malansky: Attorney who replaced Paul Drake, Jr., in 21 of the television films.
- Lieutenant Ed Brock: Police commander in several of the television films.
- Michael Reston: District attorney in eight of the television films.
- Amy Hastings: Ken Malansky's girlfriend and assistant to Mason in three of the television films.
- Elinor Harrelson: Judge in seven of the Perry Mason television films.
- Barbara August: District attorney in two of the Perry Mason television films.

== Influence ==
In her confirmation hearings before the Senate Judiciary Committee in July 2009, Supreme Court nominee Sonia Sotomayor prefaced her remarks on the role of the prosecutor by saying that she was inspired by watching the Perry Mason television series as a child:

I was influenced so greatly by a television show in igniting the passion that I had as being a prosecutor, and it was Perry Mason … In one of the episodes, at the end of the episode … Perry said to the prosecutor, "It must cause you some pain having expended all that effort in your case to have the charges dismissed." And the prosecutor looked up and said, "No. My job as a prosecutor is do justice and justice is served when a guilty man is convicted and when an innocent man is not." And I thought to myself that's quite amazing to be able to serve that role …

The Perry Mason novels inspired Robert M. Bell, former Chief Judge of the Maryland Court of Appeals, to become a lawyer. "I used to read those growing up," he recalled in 2012. "I got the sense that a lawyer could do good things for folk and was important to our community. That’s what I wanted to do."

The singer Ozzy Osbourne released a song called "Perry Mason" in his album Ozzmosis in 1995, about a hitman undercovered as a painter, which only a mind like Perry Mason's could unmask.

== Cultural references ==
A British Solicitor references many Perry Mason novels in the BBC television series May to December (1989). He even has a picture of Raymond Burr in his office, to which he speaks.
