= Under Eighteen =

1931 film

- Directed by: Archie Mayo
- Written by: Charles Kenyon
- Based on: Sky Life; 1929 story in Everybody's Magazine by Frank Mitchell Dazey; Agnes Christine Johnston
- Starring: Marian Marsh; Anita Page; Regis Toomey; Warren William
- Cinematography: Barney McGill
- Edited by: George Marks
- Music by: Leo F. Forbstein
- Production company: Warner Bros. Pictures, Inc.
- Release date: December 24, 1931 (New York City)
- Running time: 80 minutes
- Country: United States
- Language: English

Under Eighteen is a 1931 American pre-Code romantic drama film directed by Archie Mayo and starring Marian Marsh, Anita Page, Regis Toomey and Warren William. It is based on the short story "Sky Life" by Frank Mitchell Dazey and Agnes Christine Johnston.

== Plot ==
Marge Evans is a seamstress, supporting her mother but fearing that poverty will ruin her romance with boyfriend Jimmie Slocum. Her fears are heightened when her sister Sophie moves in with her and her unemployed husband Alf, and the two are constantly arguing over money. When a wealthy playboy and Broadway producer Raymond Harding becomes interested in Marge, Jimmie gets jealous and insists that they marry immediately. Sophie wants a divorce but cannot afford a lawyer; when both Jimmie and her boss refuse to lend her the money, Marge turns to Harding. Harding's original intent is to seduce Marge, but he is moved by her innocence and gives her the money as a gift. Jimmie misinterprets the situation and attacks Harding, causing a brief panic until they discover that Harding is unharmed. The money is rendered unnecessary when Alf wins a pool tournament and reconciles with Sophie.

== Cast ==
- Marian Marsh as Margie Evans
- Anita Page as Sophie
- Regis Toomey as Jimmie Slocum
- Warren William as Raymond Harding
- Norman Foster as Alf
- Joyce Compton as Sybil
- J. Farrell MacDonald as Pop Evans
- Claire Dodd as Babsy
- Paul Porcasi as François
- Maude Eburne as Mrs. McCarthy
- Murray Kinnell as Peterson
- Dorothy Appleby as Elsie

== Critical reception ==
In his New York Times review, Mordaunt Hall described the film as "earnest, rather than intelligent" and stated that "The authors have more to answer for than the players."

Variety gave a negative review and also blamed the quality of the writing saying that it "handcuffs everyone." They continued, "Mayo, the director, has permitted all the usual studio exaggerations which invariably go with this much-repeated interpretation of Cinderella." They noted that this marked the first starring role for Marian Marsh and that the studio was aiming to build Marsh and co-star Warren William, but stated that this film "will not benefit either of them" and that Marsh "fails to impress" in the dramatic scenes.

The Film Daily described the story as "artificial" and "old fashioned", and commented, "Almost from the beginning the outcome of this story is so obvious that it hardly seems to justify the lavishness expended upon it."
