= Della Street =

Confidential secretary of Perry Mason

- Perry Mason character
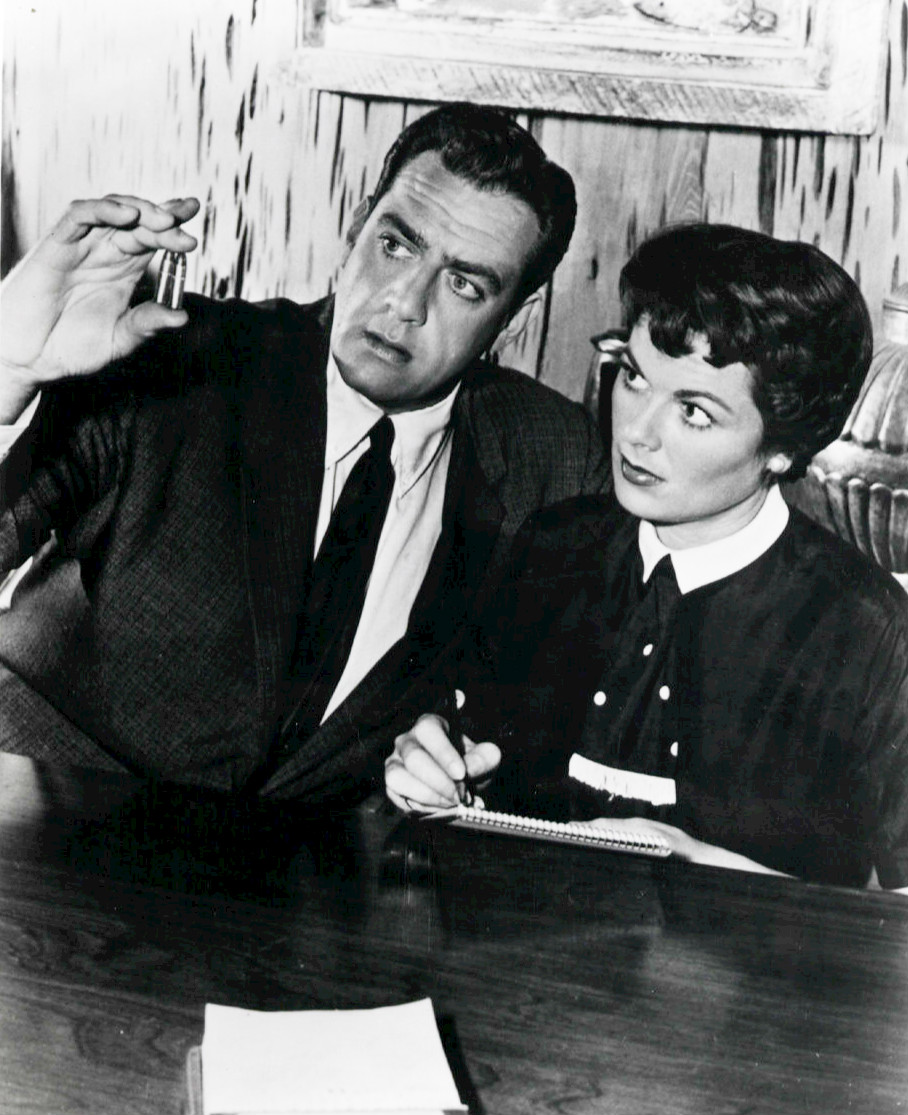
- Perry Mason (Raymond Burr) and Della Street (Barbara Hale) in the CBS-TV series, Perry Mason (1958)
- First appearance: The Case of the Velvet Claws (1933)
- Created by: Erle Stanley Gardner
- Portrayed by: Helen Trenholme; Claire Dodd; Genevieve Tobin; June Travis; Ann Dvorak; Gertrude Warner; Joan Alexander; Jan Miner; Barbara Hale; Sharon Acker; Juliet Rylance

In-universe information
- Gender: Female
- Occupation: Secretary
- Nationality: American

Della Street is the fictional secretary of Perry Mason in the long-running series of novels, short stories, films, and radio and television programs featuring the fictional defense attorney created by Erle Stanley Gardner.

In 1950, Gardner published the short story "The Case of the Suspect Sweethearts" under the pseudonym Della Street.

== Description ==
=== Original novels ===
A character named Della Street first appeared in Gardner's unpublished novel Reasonable Doubt, where she was a secretary, but not the secretary of the lawyer, Ed Stark. Gardner described her this way: "Della Street … Secretary, twenty-seven, quiet, fast as hell on her feet, had been places. Worked in a carnival or side show, knows all the lines, hard-boiled exterior, quietly efficient, puzzled over the lawyer, chestnut hair, trim figure, some lines on her face, a hint of weariness at the corners of her eyes." When Gardner submitted Reasonable Doubt to William Morrow, an editor suggested that "Della Street is a better character than the secretary." Gardner took this suggestion when he rewrote Reasonable Doubt as The Case of the Velvet Claws and made Della Street Perry Mason's secretary. In the published novel, the carnival or side show was jettisoned, and Street came from a more "respectable" background.

The Case of the Velvet Claws, the first Perry Mason novel, was written in the early days of the Great Depression. In it, Della Street is revealed to have come from a wealthy, or at least well-to-do, family that was wiped out by the stock market crash of 1929. Della was forced to get a job as a secretary. By the time of the TV series in the 1950s and 1960s, this would not have fit well with the age of the characters as then portrayed. According to The Case of The Caretaker's Cat, she is about 15 years younger than Perry Mason.

Several instances of sexual tension are seen between Mason and Street in the Gardner novels, multiple glances, kisses, and so on, and several proposals of marriage, all of which Della turned down because, at the time, wives of professional men did not work. Thus, she could not have continued as his secretary (and effective partner) and she did not want to give up this aspect of her life.

=== Adaptations ===
Gardner was disappointed by the initial set of Perry Mason films. One such change was how Street ended up married to Mason.

In the 2020 HBO adaptation, Della Street is a lesbian, living with her girlfriend.

== Origin ==
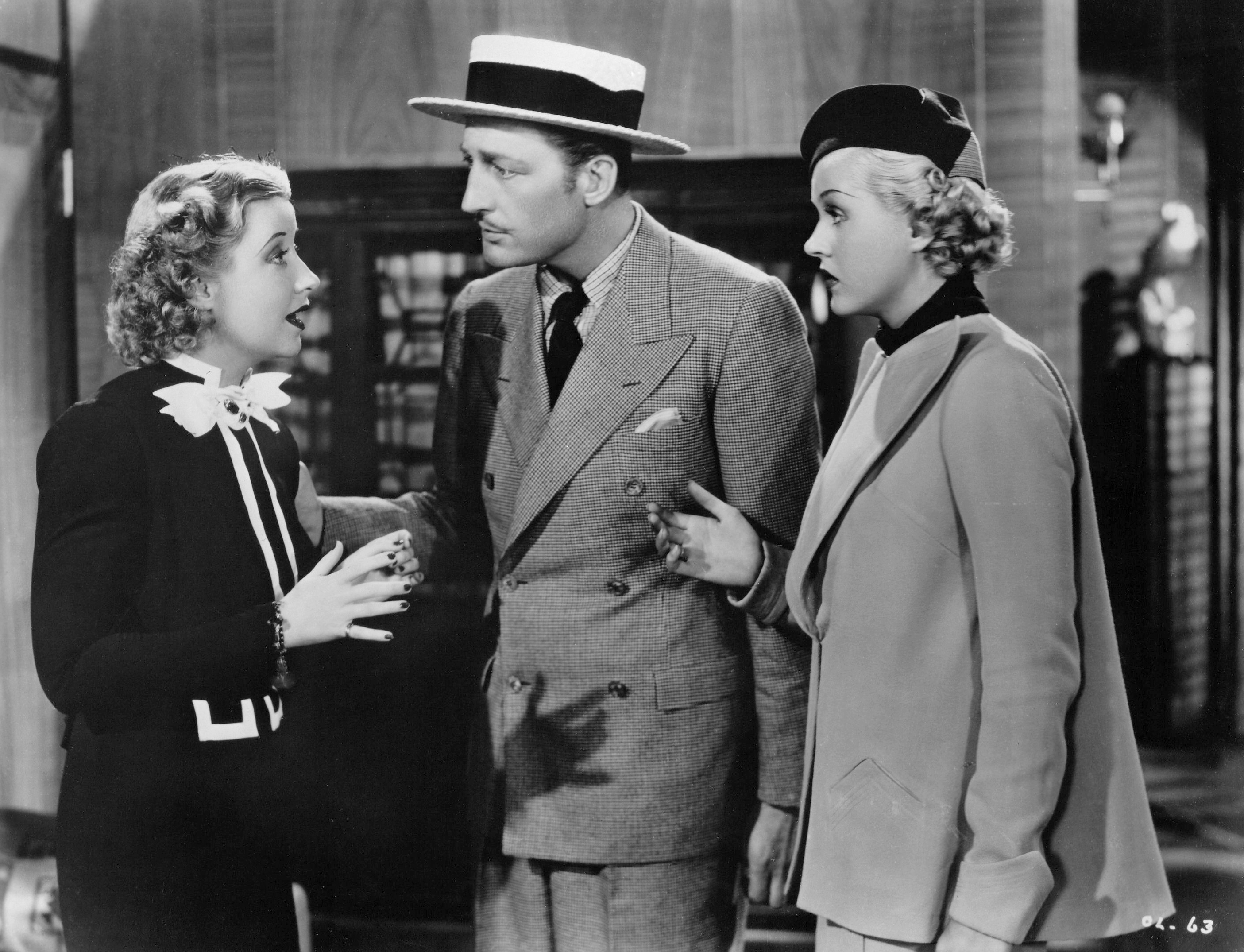
Genevieve Tobin (left) as Della Street, with Warren William and Patricia Ellis in The Case of the Lucky Legs (1935)

Erle Stanley Gardner, the creator of Perry Mason in a series of novels, was a very prolific author, who simultaneously employed three secretaries—all sisters—to keep up with his output. One of them he eventually married, after his first wife—from whom he was separated for 30 years—died. This was Jean Gardner, born Agnes Helene Walter. People who knew her believed she was the inspiration for Della Street, though neither she nor Gardner himself admitted it. Mrs. Gardner said she thought he put several women together to create the character.

== Portrayals ==
Juliet Rylance in HBO's Perry Mason (2020)

=== Film ===
In the film adaptations made in the 1930s, Della Street was portrayed by five different actresses: Helen Trenholme (The Case of the Howling Dog), Claire Dodd (The Case of the Curious Bride and The Case of the Velvet Claws), Genevieve Tobin (The Case of the Lucky Legs), June Travis (The Case of the Black Cat), and Ann Dvorak (The Case of the Stuttering Bishop).

=== Radio ===
Gertrude Warner was the first actress to portray Street regularly, albeit on the radio series. She was succeeded in the role by Joan Alexander, better known for portraying Lois Lane in the Superman radio series, and Jan Miner (Palmolive's "Madge").

The character portrayed in the radio series was reworked into Sara Lane on the daytime show Edge of Night, which was to be the daytime Perry Mason series until Gardner pulled his support for the project.

=== Television ===
On television, Della Street was played by Barbara Hale in the series, for which she received an Emmy Award, and in the 30 made-for-TV movies. Sharon Acker played Della Street in the short-lived revival series The New Perry Mason starring Monte Markham as Mason.

In the HBO series, Della Street is portrayed by British actress Juliet Rylance.
