= Claire Dodd =

American actress (1911–1973)

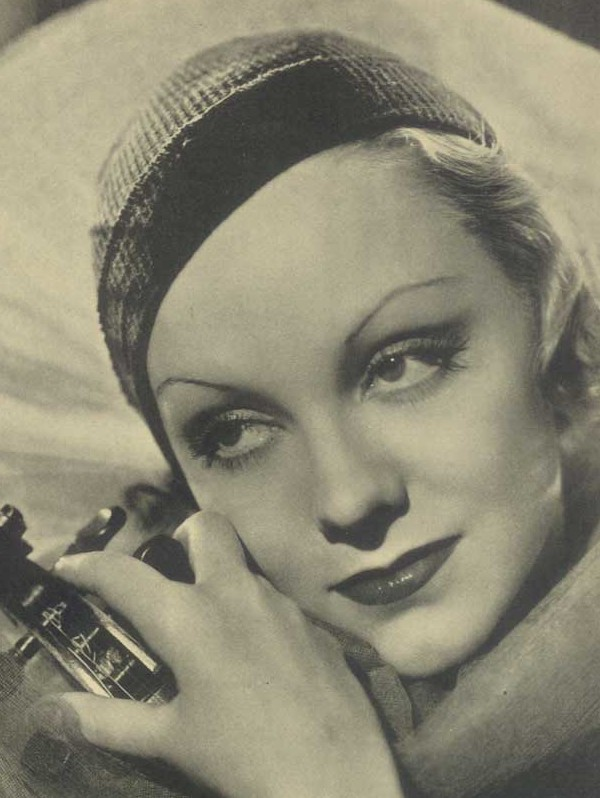
- Dodd in 1933
- Born: Dorothy Arlene Dodd; December 29, 1911; Baxter, Iowa, U.S.
- Died: November 23, 1973 (aged 61); Beverly Hills, California, U.S.
- Resting place: Brand Family Cemetery, Glendale, California
- Occupation: Actress
- Years active: 1930–1942
- Spouses: Jack Milton Strauss (m. 1931; div. 1938) H. Brand Cooper (m. 1942)
- Children: 5

Claire Dodd (born Dorothy Arlene Dodd; December 29, 1911 – November 23, 1973 ) was an American film actress.

== Early life ==
Dorothy Arlene Dodd was born on December 29, 1911, in Baxter, Iowa, to Walter Willard Dodd, a farmer whose family were early Jasper County pioneers, and his wife, Ethel Viola (née Cool) Dodd, daughter of Baxter postmaster Peter J. Cool. Her parents married on June 28, 1911. The family moved frequently while she was growing up, living in Denver, Kansas City, Phoenix, St. Louis, and Missoula, Montana, among other places. Her parents separated in Montana. Young Dorothy went to California around 1927 where she worked as a model in Los Angeles and auditioned for minor film roles.

== Career ==
Claire Dodd

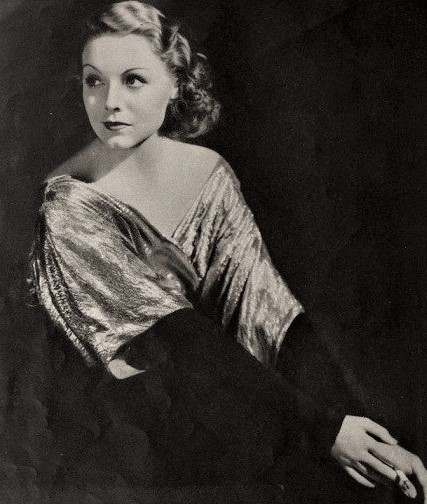
Dodd in 1935

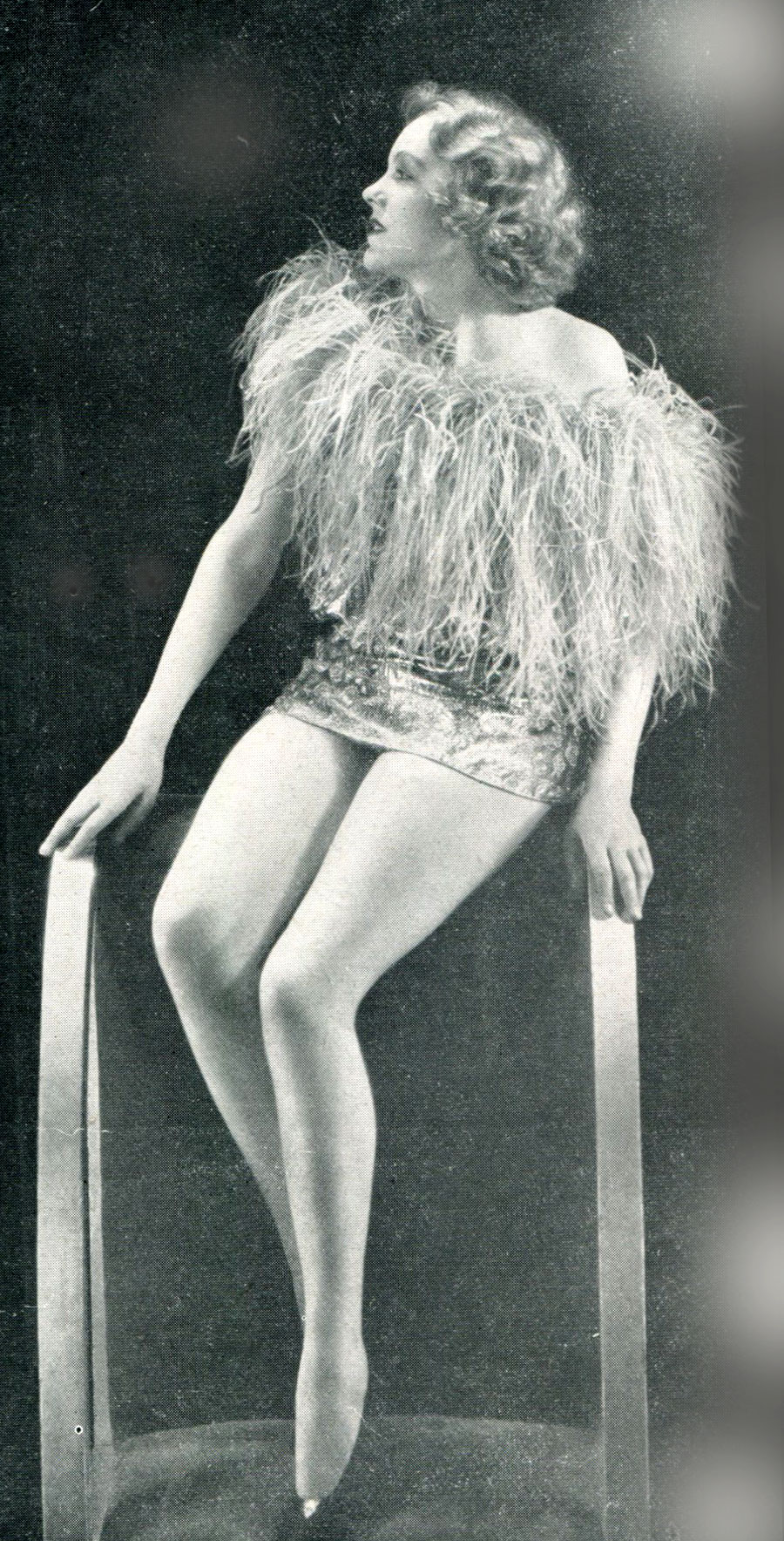
Dodd in 1933

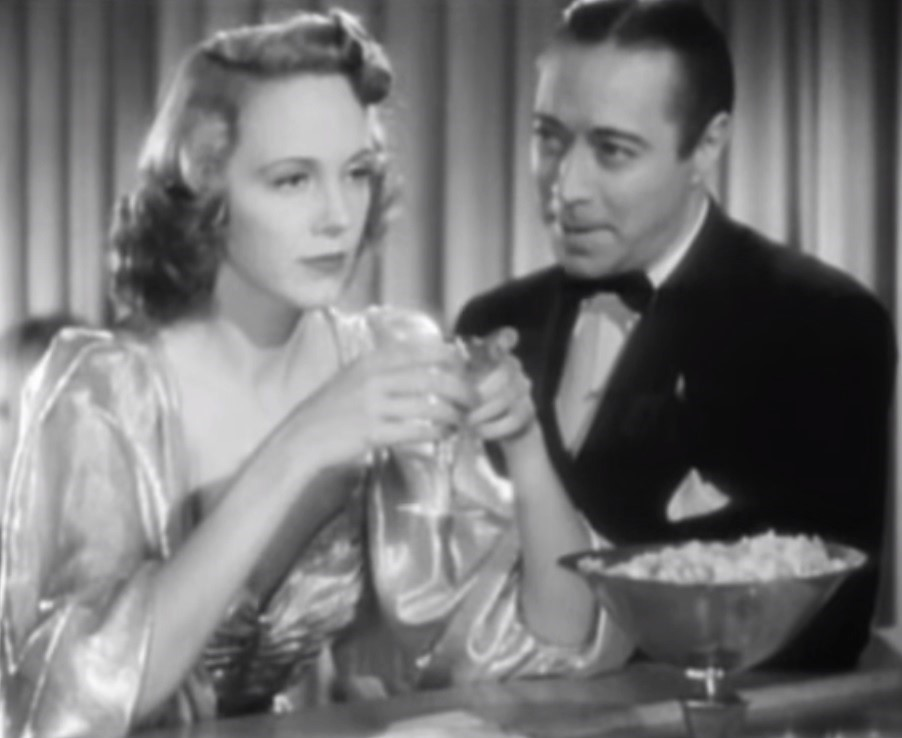
Dodd with Bernard Nedell in Slightly Honorable (1939)

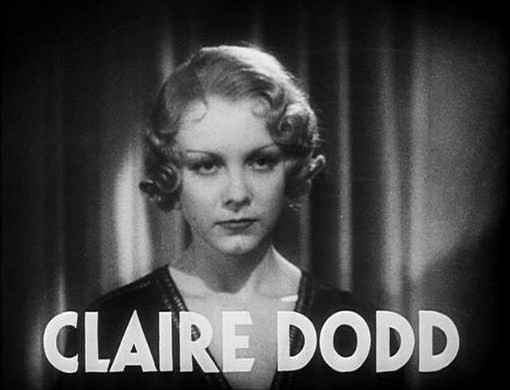
Trailer for Footlight Parade (1933)

While working as a model in Los Angeles, she was cast in a small part in Eddie Cantor's movie Whoopee!, which was produced by Florenz Ziegfeld. Ziegfeld offered Dodd a part in his next Broadway musical, Smiles. She moved to New York City, where she studied singing and dancing. After Smiles ended, she signed a five-year contract with Paramount Pictures. After acting in bit parts in several films, she was signed to a Warner Bros. contract by Darryl F. Zanuck.

Some confusion has led to Dodd's birthplace being listed as Des Moines, Iowa. Early in her career, Dodd applied for a passport in preparation for a trip to Europe, and was reported as saying she only knew she was born in Iowa. Whether an attempted bit of publicity, she wound up with plenty in her home state. "My early childhood is just a blur to me," she once said. "I don't remember a thing about Iowa, I'm sorry to say. I was so small when I left there." Dodd had numerous relatives who still lived in and around Baxter when her apparent memory lapse was reported in the Register & Tribune's Iowa News Service on April 29, 1935. Locals were in an uproar for a time, spurred on by newspaper editorials taking the incident as an insult to a small town in rural Iowa. Deputy Jasper County Clerk John B. Norris quickly sent a copy of her birth certificate to Dodd by registered mail to end the question.

Dodd went on to work at Warner Brothers, Paramount and Universal studios in more than sixty films over a dozen years, from 1930-1942. Dodd was usually type-cast as the "other woman", a femme fatale, siren, seductress, mistress, blackmailer, or other kind of predator or schemer.

She also twice played secretary Della Street to Warren William's Perry Mason, in The Case of the Curious Bride (1935), and The Case of the Velvet Claws (1936). In the latter, Dodd's character was the only incarnation of Della Street to ever wed Mason. One of her last films was Abbott and Costello's In the Navy (1941).

== Personal life ==
Claire Dodd was Hollywood's "mystery girl" in the 1930s -- a label she acquired because she was good at keeping her personal and professional lives separate. In 1931, Dodd married John Milton Strauss, an investment banker. She gave birth to her first child, Jon Michael Strauss (born 1936), which surprised many in Hollywood society who did not even know she was married. The couple divorced in 1938.

She retired from acting and married her second husband, Harry Brand Cooper, a member of the prominent Brand family in Glendale, in 1942. They had four children: a daughter (Austeene); and three sons (John T., Brand, and Peter).

== Death ==
She died at her home in Beverly Hills, California, from cancer, aged 61. She is buried in the Brand Family Cemetery on the grounds of the Brand Library and Art Center in Glendale, California.

== Partial filmography ==
- Our Blushing Brides (1930) as A Mannequin
- Whoopee! (1930) as Goldwyn Girl (uncredited)
- Up Pops the Devil (1931) as Minor Role (uncredited)
- The Lawyer's Secret (1931) as Party Guest (uncredited)
- Confessions of a Co-Ed (1931) as Co-Ed in Chapel (uncredited)
- The Secret Call (1931) as Maisie
- An American Tragedy (1931) as Gaile Warren (uncredited)
- The Road to Reno (1931) as Party Girl (uncredited)
- Girls About Town (1931) as Dot, Party Girl (uncredited)
- Working Girls (1931) as Jane
- Under Eighteen (1931) as Babsy
- Two Kinds of Women (1932) as Sheila Lavery (uncredited)
- Alias the Doctor (1932) as Mrs. Beverly (uncredited)
- The Broken Wing (1932) as Cecelia Cross
- This Is the Night (1932) as Chou-Chou (uncredited)
- Man Wanted (1932) as Ann Le Maire
- Guilty as Hell (1932) as Ruth Tindal
- The Crooner (1932) as Mrs. Constance Brown
- Lawyer Man (1932) as Virginia St. Johns
- The Match King (1932) as Ilse Wagner
- Parachute Jumper (1933) as Mrs. Newberry
- Hard to Handle (1933) as Marlene Reeves
- Blondie Johnson (1933) as Gladys LaMann
- Elmer, the Great (1933) as Evelyn Corey
- Ex-Lady (1933) as Iris Van Hugh
- Ann Carver's Profession (1933) as Carole Rodgers
- Footlight Parade (1933) as Vivian Rich
- My Woman (1933) as Muriel Bennett
- Massacre (1934) as Norma
- Gambling Lady (1934) as Sheila Aiken
- Journal of a Crime (1934) as Odette Florey
- Smarty (1934) as Anita
- The Personality Kid (1934) as Patricia Merrill
- I Sell Anything (1934) as Millicent
- Secret of the Chateau (1934) as Julie Verlaine
- Babbitt (1934) as Tanis Judique
- Roberta (1935) as Sophie Teale
- The Case of the Curious Bride (1935) as Della Street
- The Glass Key (1935) as Janet Henry
- Don't Bet on Blondes (1935) as Marilyn Youngblood
- The Goose and the Gander (1935) as Connie
- The Payoff (1935) as Maxine
- Two Against the World (1936) as Cora Latimer
- The Singing Kid (1936) as Dana Lawrence
- Navy Born (1936) as Bernice Farrington
- Murder by an Aristocrat (1936) as Janice Thatcher
- The Case of the Velvet Claws (1936) as Della Street
- The Women Men Marry (1937) as Claire Raeburn
- Romance in the Dark (1938) as Countess Monica Foldesay
- Fast Company (1938) as Julia Thorne
- Three Loves Has Nancy (1938) as Vivian Herford
- Charlie Chan in Honolulu (1938) as Mrs. Carol Wayne
- Woman Doctor (1939) as Gail Patterson
- Slightly Honorable (1939) as Alma Brehmer
- If I Had My Way (1940) as Brenda Johnson
- The Black Cat (1941) as Margaret Gordon
- In the Navy (1941) as Dorothy Roberts
- Don Winslow of the Navy (1942) as Mercedes Colby
- The Mad Doctor of Market Street (1942) as Patricia Wentworth
- Mississippi Gambler (1942) as Gladys La Verne
- Daring Young Man (1942) as Marlene

== Sources ==
- "When Dorothy forgot: 'There's no place like home'", Sunday Times-Republican Past Times, November 17, 1996, Marshalltown, Iowa.
