= Warren William =

Broadway and Hollywood actor (1894–1948)

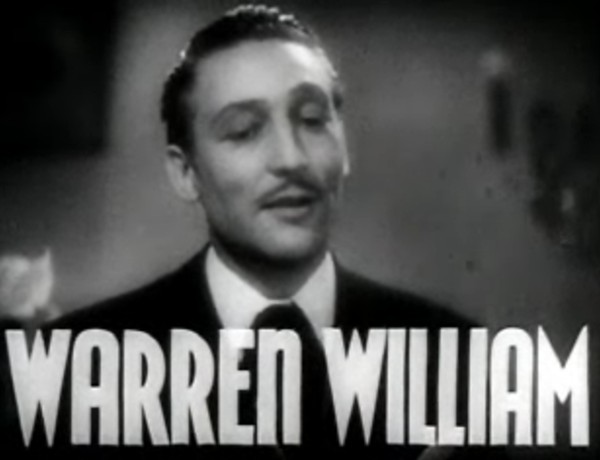
- William in Goodbye Again (1933)
- Born: Warren William Krech; December 2, 1894; Aitkin, Minnesota, U.S.
- Died: September 24, 1948 (aged 53); Hollywood, California, U.S.
- Other name: Warren W. Krech
- Education: American Academy of Dramatic Arts
- Occupation: Actor
- Years active: 1919–1947
- Spouse: Helen Barbara Nelson (m. 1923)
- Military career
- Allegiance: United States
- Branch: United States Army
- Service years: 1917-1919
- Conflicts: World War I

Warren William Krech (December 2, 1894 – September 24, 1948) was an American stage and screen actor, who achieved Hollywood stardom during the early 1930s. Later earning the nickname the "King of Pre-Code", he typified the cunning, often-amoral leading men of early sound cinema. According to one critic, "no other actor embodied the classy mix of charm and sleaze that epitomized pre-Code Hollywood." He was also the first actor to portray fictional lawyer Perry Mason.

== Early life ==
William was born in Aitkin, Minnesota, in 1894, to parents of German ancestry. His family originated in Bad Tennstedt, Thuringia, Germany. His grandfather, Ernst Wilhelm Krech (born 1819), fled Germany during the first year of the German revolutions of 1848–49, going first to France and later emigrating to the United States. He wed Mathilde Grow in 1851, and had six children. Freeman E. Krech, Warren's father, was born in 1856. Around the age of 25, Freeman moved to Aitkin, a small town in Minnesota, where he bought a newspaper, The Aitkin Age, in 1885. He married Frances Potter, daughter of a merchant, September 18, 1890. Their son Warren was born December 2, 1894.

William's interest in acting began in 1903, when an opera house was built in Aitkin. He was an avid and lifelong amateur inventor and was personally involved in working his farm, pursuits that may have contributed to his death by exposing him to a variety of dangerous contaminants, ranging from sawdust to DDT, and held a patent on the first lawn vacuum. After high school, William auditioned for, and was enrolled in, the American Academy of Dramatic Arts (AADA) in New York City in October 1915.

As his senior year at AADA was coming to an end, the United States had entered the First World War, and William enlisted in the United States Army. He was assigned from base to base, in charge of training new men at various locations, and in 1918 was assigned to Fort Dix, New Jersey, near New York City. During this period, he met his future wife, Helen Barbara Nelson, who was 17 years his elder. In October 1918, William's unit was deployed to the front in France, and the war ended one month later. William's military service ended in 1919, after which he embarked on an acting career. In 1923, he and Helen were married.

== Career ==
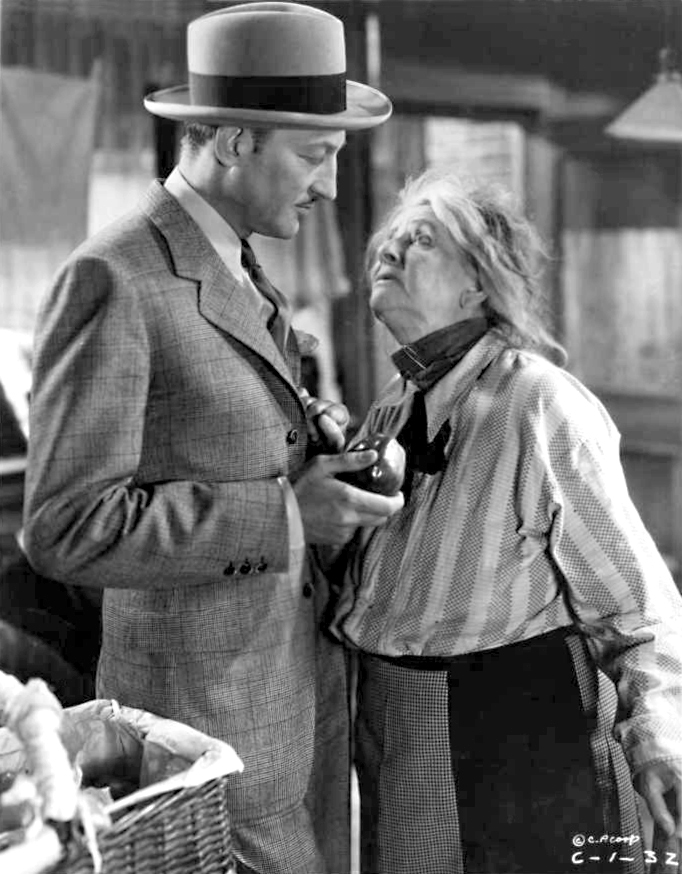
Dave the Dude (William) and Apple Annie (May Robson) in Lady for a Day (1933)

William appeared in his first Broadway play in 1920, and soon made a name for himself in New York. Between 1920 and 1931 he appeared in more than 20 plays on Broadway, and in two silent films, The Town That Forgot God (1922) and Plunder (1923).

He moved from New York City to Hollywood in 1931. Looking back at his career in 2011, The Village Voice christened him "The King of Pre-Code". He began as a contract player at Warner Bros. and quickly became a star. He developed a reputation for portraying ruthless, amoral businessmen (Under 18, Skyscraper Souls, The Match King, Employees' Entrance), crafty lawyers (The Mouthpiece, Perry Mason), and outright charlatans (The Mind Reader). These roles were considered controversial, yet were highly satisfying. This was the harshest period of the Great Depression, characterized by massive business failures and oppressive unemployment. Movie audiences jeered at the businessmen, who were often portrayed as predators.

William did play some sympathetic roles, including Dave the Dude in Frank Capra's Lady for a Day, and a loving father and husband cuckolded by Ann Dvorak's character in Three on a Match (1932). He was a young songwriter's comically pompous older brother in Gold Diggers of 1933. William was Julius Caesar in Cecil B. DeMille's Cleopatra (1934; starring Claudette Colbert), and with Colbert again the same year as her character's love interest in Imitation of Life (1934). He played the swashbuckling musketeer d'Artagnan in The Man in the Iron Mask (1939), directed by James Whale.

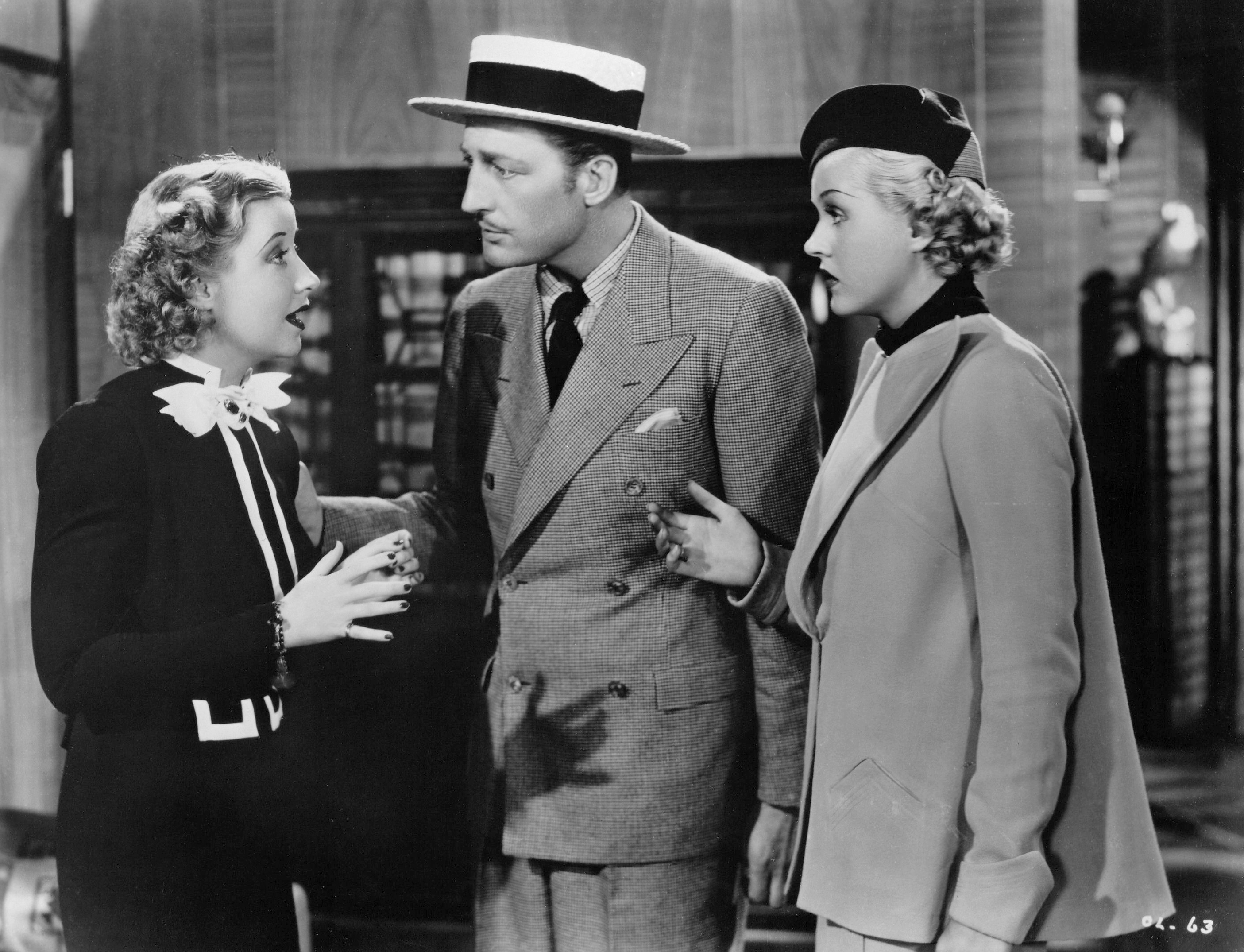
William as Perry Mason in The Case of the Lucky Legs (1935), with Genevieve Tobin and Patricia Ellis

The studios capitalized on William's popularity by placing him in multiple "series" films, particularly as detectives and crime solvers. William was the first to portray Erle Stanley Gardner's fictional defense attorney Perry Mason on the big screen, starring in four Perry Mason mysteries. He played a Raffles-like reformed jewel thief The Lone Wolf in nine films, beginning with The Lone Wolf Spy Hunt (1939), and appeared as Detective Philo Vance in two of the series films, The Dragon Murder Case (1934) and the comedic The Gracie Allen Murder Case (1939). He also starred as Sam Spade (renamed Ted Shane) in Satan Met a Lady (1936), the second screen version of The Maltese Falcon.

Other roles included Mae West's manager in Go West, Young Man (1936); a jealous district attorney in another James Whale film, Wives Under Suspicion (1938); copper magnate Jesse Lewisohn in 1940's Lillian Russell; the evil Jefferson Carteret in Arizona (also 1940); and the sympathetic Dr. Lloyd in The Wolf Man (1941). In 1945, he played Brett Curtis in cult director Edgar G. Ulmer's 1945 modern-day version of Hamlet, called Strange Illusion. In what would be his last film, he played Laroche-Mathieu in The Private Affairs of Bel Ami in 1947.

On radio, William starred in the transcribed series Strange Wills, which featured "stories behind strange wills that run the gamut of human emotion."

== Personal life ==
Although on-screen William was an actor audiences loved to hate, off-screen he was a private man, and he and his wife Helen kept out of the limelight. She and Warren remained a couple throughout his entire adult life. He was often described as having been shy in real life. Co-star Joan Blondell once said, "[He] ... was an old man – even when he was a young man."

=== Death ===
William died on September 24, 1948, from multiple myeloma, at age 53. His wife died a few months later. He was recognized for his contribution to motion pictures with a star on the Hollywood Walk of Fame in February 1960.

== Filmography ==
Year	Title	Role	Studio/Distributor	Notes	Ref(s)
1923	The Town That Forgot God	Eben, the carpenter	Fox Film	as 'Warren Krech'	
1923	Plunder	Mr. Jones	George B. Seitz Productions	as 'Warren Krech'; 15-episode Pearl White silent serial	
1931	Honor of the Family	Captain Boris Barony	First National Pictures		
1931	Expensive Women	Neil Hartley	Warner Bros. Pictures		
1932	Three on a Match	Robert Kirkwood	First National Pictures		
1932	The Dark Horse	Hal Samson Blake	First National Pictures		
1932	Skyscraper Souls	David Dwight	Metro-Goldwyn-Mayer		
1932	The Mouthpiece	Vincent Day	Warner Bros. Pictures		
1932	The Match King	Paul Kroll	First National Pictures		
1932	Beauty and the Boss	Baron Josef von Ullrich	Warner Bros. Pictures		
1932	The Woman from Monte Carlo	Lieutenant d'Ortelles	First National Pictures		
1932	Under Eighteen	Raymond Harding	Warner Bros. Pictures		
1933	Goodbye Again	Kenneth Bixby	First National Pictures		
1933	Lady for a Day	Dave the Dude	Columbia Pictures		
1933	The Mind Reader	Chandra Chandler	First National Pictures		
1933	Gold Diggers of 1933	J. Lawrence Bradford	Warner Bros. Pictures		
1933	Employees' Entrance	Kurt Anderson	First National Pictures		
1933	Just Around the Corner	Mr. Sears	General Electric	Promotional short	
1934	The Secret Bride	Robert Sheldon	Warner Bros. Pictures		
1934	Cleopatra	Julius Caesar	Paramount Pictures		
1934	Dr. Monica	John Braden	Warner Bros. Pictures		
1934	Smarty	Tony Wallace	Warner Bros. Pictures		
1934	Imitation of Life	Stephen Archer	Universal Pictures		
1934	The Case of the Howling Dog	Perry Mason	Warner Bros. Pictures	First film depiction of Perry Mason	
1934	The Dragon Murder Case	Philo Vance	First National Pictures		
1934	Bedside	Bob Brown	First National Pictures		
1934	Upperworld	Alex Stream	Warner Bros. Pictures		
1935	Living on Velvet	Walter "Gibraltar" Pritcham	First National Pictures		
1935	Don't Bet on Blondes	Odds Owen	Warner Bros. Pictures		
1935	The Case of the Curious Bride	Perry Mason	First National Pictures		
1935	The Case of the Lucky Legs	Perry Mason	Warner Bros. Pictures		
1936	Satan Met a Lady	Ted Shane	Warner Bros. Pictures		
1936	Go West, Young Man	Morgan	Major Pictures Corp.		
1936	The Widow from Monte Carlo	Major Allan Chepstow	Warner Bros. Pictures		
1936	The Case of the Velvet Claws	Perry Mason	First National Pictures		
1936	Times Square Playboy	Vic Arnold	Warner Bros. Pictures		
1936	Stage Struck	Fred Harris	First National Pictures		
1937	Outcast	Dr. Wendell Phillips Jones	Major Pictures Corp.		
1937	Midnight Madonna	Blackie Denbo	Major Pictures Corp.		
1937	Madame X	Bernard Fleuriot	Metro-Goldwyn-Mayer		
1937	The Firefly	Major de Rouchemont	Metro-Goldwyn-Mayer		
1938	Wives Under Suspicion	District Attorney Jim Stowell	Universal Pictures		
1938	The First Hundred Years	Harry Borden	Metro-Goldwyn-Mayer		
1938	Arsène Lupin Returns	Steve Emerson	Metro-Goldwyn-Mayer		
1939	The Gracie Allen Murder Case	Philo Vance	Paramount Pictures		
1939	The Lone Wolf Spy Hunt	Michael Lanyard / "The Lone Wolf"	Columbia Pictures		
1939	Day-Time Wife	Bernard Dexter	20th Century Fox		
1939	The Man in the Iron Mask	d'Artagnan	Edward Small Productions		
1940	Lillian Russell	Jesse Lewisohn	20th Century Fox		
1940	Trail of the Vigilantes	Mark Dawson	Universal Pictures		
1940	The Lone Wolf Meets a Lady	Michael Lanyard / "The Lone Wolf"	Columbia Pictures		
1940	The Lone Wolf Keeps a Date	Michael Lanyard / "The Lone Wolf"	Columbia Pictures		
1940	The Lone Wolf Strikes	Michael Lanyard / "The Lone Wolf"	Columbia Pictures		
1940	Arizona	Jefferson Carteret	Columbia Pictures		
1941	The Wolf Man	Dr. Lloyd	Universal Pictures		
1941	The Lone Wolf Takes a Chance	Michael Lanyard / "The Lone Wolf"	Columbia Pictures		
1941	Secrets of the Lone Wolf	Michael Lanyard / "The Lone Wolf"	Columbia Pictures		
1941	Wild Geese Calling	Blackie Bedford	20th Century Fox		
1942	Counter-Espionage	Michael Lanyard / "The Lone Wolf"	Columbia Pictures		
1942	Wild Bill Hickok Rides	Harry Farrel	Warner Bros. Pictures		
1943	One Dangerous Night	Michael Lanyard / "The Lone Wolf"	Columbia Pictures		
1943	Passport to Suez	Michael Lanyard / "The Lone Wolf"	Columbia Pictures		
1945	Strange Illusion	Brett Curtis	Producers Releasing Corporation		
1946	Fear	Police Capt. Burke	Monogram Pictures		
1947	The Private Affairs of Bel Ami	Laroche-Mathieu	United Artists		

== Partial stage credits ==
Note: The list below is limited to New York/Broadway theatrical productions; listed as Warren William, except where noted

Broadway credits of Warren William
Run	Title	Role	Notes	Ref(s)
Mar 29, 1920 - May 1920	Mrs. Jimmie Thompson	Edgar Blodgett	as 'Warren W. Krech'	
Jan 24, 1921 - Jan 1921	John Hawthorne	John Hawthorne	as 'Warren W. Krech'	
Nov 09, 1921 - Nov 1921	We Girls	Doctor Tom Brown	as 'Warren W. Krech'	
Feb 12, 1924 - Apr 1924	The Wonderful Visit	Sir John Gotch, K.B.E.		
Apr 16, 1924 - Jun 1924	Expressing Willie	George Cadwalader		
Feb 16, 1925 - Feb 1925	Nocturne	Keith Reddington		
Mar 24, 1925 - Apr 1925	The Blue Peter	David Hunter		
May 5, 1925 - May 1925	Rosmersholm	Johannes Rosmer		
Nov 16, 1925 - Apr 1926	Twelve Miles Out	Gerald Fey		
Mar 18, 1926 - Apr 1926	Easter One More Day	Elis		
Sep 21, 1926 - Nov 1926	Fanny	Joe White		
Dec 26, 1927 - Jan 1928	Paradise	Dr. Achilles Swain		
Mar 13, 1928 - Mar 1928	Veils	Mr. Robert Sloan		
Apr 24, 1928 - Apr 1928	The Golden Age	The Stranger		
Dec 11, 1928 - Jan 1929	Sign of the Leopard	Captain Leslie		
Feb 19, 1929 - Dec 1929	Let Us Be Gay	Bob Brown	Replaced by Barry O'Neill for unknown number of performances	
Oct 22, 1929 - Oct 1929	Week-End	Brett Laney		
Feb 08, 1930 - Feb 1930	Out of a Blue Sky	Paul Rana		
May 12, 1930 - May 1930	The Vikings	Sigurd		
Oct 06, 1930 - Oct 1930	Stepdaughters of War	Geoffrey Hilder		
Nov 19, 1930 - Jun 1931	The Vinegar Tree	Max Lawrence		

== Bibliography ==
- Stangeland, John (2010). Warren William: Magnificent Scoundrel of Pre-Code Hollywood. McFarland. ISBN 978-0-7864-6182-0.
