= Erle Stanley Gardner =

American writer and lawyer (1889–1970)

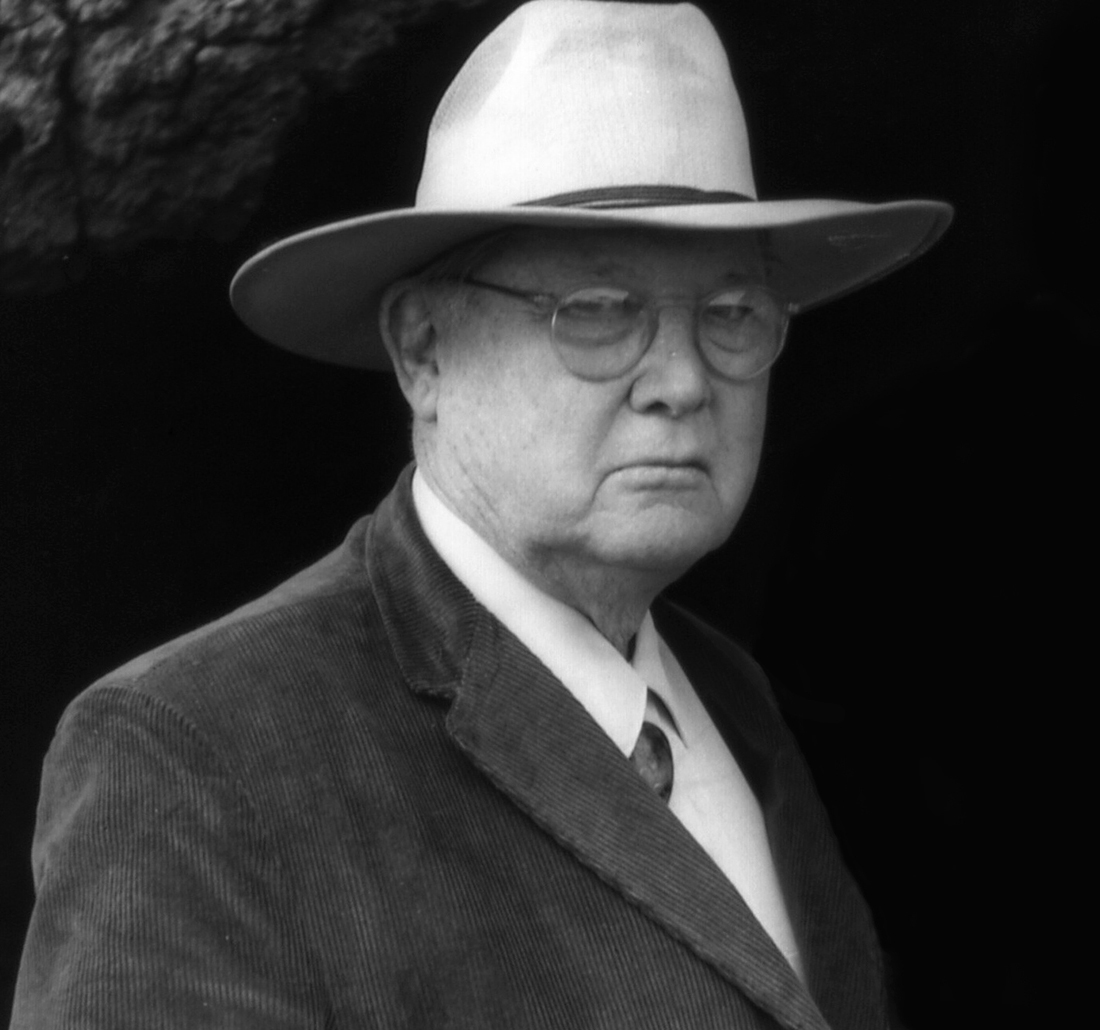
- Gardner in 1966
- Born: July 17, 1889; Malden, Massachusetts, U.S.
- Died: March 11, 1970 (aged 80); Temecula, California, U.S.
- Education: Palo Alto High School (1909); Valparaiso University School of Law (1 month)
- Occupations: Lawyer, writer
- Spouses: Natalie Frances Talbert (m. 1912; died 1968) Agnes Jean Bethell (m. 1968)
- Children: 1
- Writing career
- Pen name: A. A. Fair, Carl Franklin Ruth, Carleton Kendrake, Charles M. Green, Charles J. Kenny, Della Street, Edward Leaming, Grant Holiday, Kyle Corning, Les Tillray, Robert Parr, Stephen Caldwell
- Genres: Detective fiction, true crime, travel writing
- Notable works: Perry Mason; Cool and Lam; Doug Selby
- Notable awards: Grand Master Award, Mystery Writers of America; Edgar Award

Erle Stanley Gardner (July 17, 1889 – March 11, 1970) was an American author and lawyer, best known for the Perry Mason series of legal detective stories. Gardner also wrote numerous other novels and shorter pieces as well as a series of nonfiction books, mostly narrations of his travels through Baja California and other regions in Mexico.

The best-selling American author of the 20th century at the time of his death, Gardner also published under numerous pseudonyms, including A. A. Fair, Carl Franklin Ruth, Carleton Kendrake, Charles M. Green, Charles J. Kenny, Edward Leaming, Grant Holiday, Kyle Corning, Les Tillray, Robert Parr, Stephen Caldwell, and once as the Perry Mason character Della Street ("The Case of the Suspect Sweethearts"). Three stories were published anonymously: "A Fair Trial", "Part Music and Part Tears", and "You Can't Run Away from Yourself", also known as "The Jazz Baby".

== Life and work ==
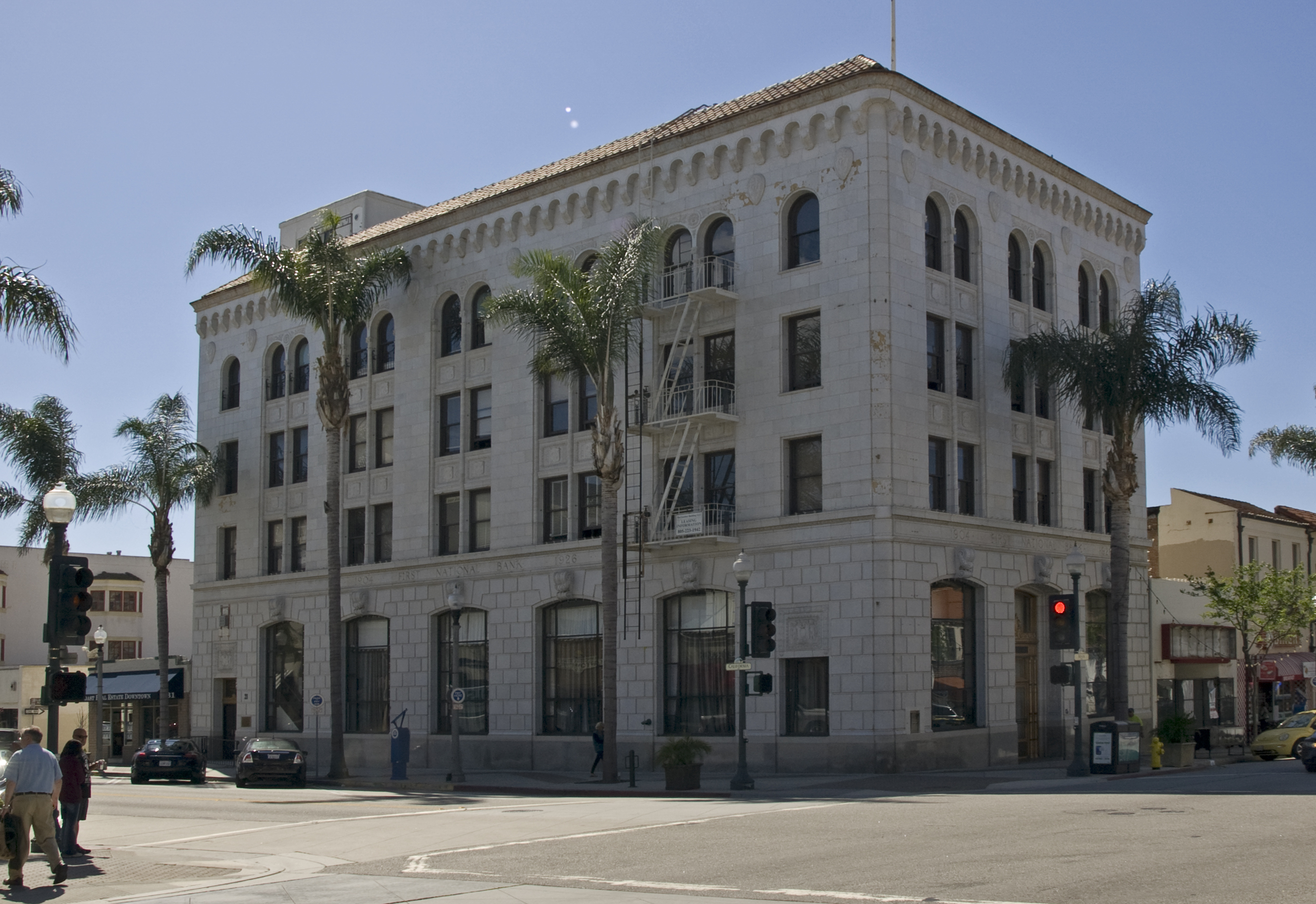
The First National Bank Building in Ventura, California, where Gardner wrote drafts for the first Perry Mason novels

Gardner was born in Malden, Massachusetts, the son of Grace Adelma (Waugh) and Charles Walter Gardner. Gardner graduated from Palo Alto High School in California in 1909 and enrolled at Valparaiso University School of Law in Indiana. He was suspended after approximately one month when his interest in boxing became a distraction. He returned to California, pursued his legal education on his own, and passed the California State Bar examination in 1911.

Gardner started his legal career by working as a typist at a law firm in California for three years. Once he was admitted to the Bar, he started working as a trial lawyer by defending impoverished people, in particular Chinese and Mexican immigrants. This experience led to his founding the Court of Last Resort in the 1940s. The Court of Last Resort, dedicated to helping people who were imprisoned unfairly or couldn't get a fair trial, was the first of several organizations that advocate for the wrongly convicted, which among others include Innocence Project, Center on Wrongful Convictions at Northwestern Pritzker School of Law, and Centurion.

In 1912, Gardner wed Natalie Frances Talbert. They had a daughter, Grace. He opened his first law office in Merced in 1917, but closed it after accepting a position at a sales agency. In 1921, he returned to law as a member of the Ventura firm Sheridan, Orr, Drapeau, and Gardner, where he remained until the publication of his first Perry Mason novel in 1933.

Gardner enjoyed litigation and the development of trial strategy but was otherwise bored by legal practice. In his spare time, he began writing for pulp magazines. His first story, "The Police in the House", was published in June 1921 in Breezy Stories magazine. He created many series characters for the pulps, including the ingenious Lester Leith, a parody of the "gentleman thief" in the tradition of A. J. Raffles; and Ken Corning, crusading lawyer, crime sleuth, and archetype for his most successful creation, Perry Mason.

== Perry Mason ==
The Perry Mason character was inspired by Earl Rogers, a trial attorney who appeared in 77 murder trials but lost only three. He was recognized for the extensive use of demonstratives, e.g., visuals, charts and diagrams, during trial before it became common practice. Rogers is famous for his defense of, and attorney-client disagreement with, Clarence Darrow, a fellow attorney who was charged with attempted jury bribery in 1912.

While the Perry Mason novels seldom delved deeply into characters' lives, the novels were rich in plot detail which was reality-based and drawn from his own experience. In his early years writing for the pulp magazine market, Gardner set himself a quota of 1,200,000 words a year. Early on, he typed stories himself, using two fingers, but later dictated them to a team of secretaries.

Much of the first Perry Mason novel,The Case of the Velvet Claws, published in 1933, is set at the historic Pierpont Inn near Gardner's old law office in Ventura, California. In 1937, Gardner moved to Temecula, California, where he lived for the rest of his life. With the success of the Mason series, more than 80 novels, Gardner gradually reduced his contributions to the pulp magazines until the medium died in the 1950s.

Perry Mason executive producer Gail Patrick Jackson (left) and Gardner speak with Hollywood columnist Norma Lee Browning during filming of the last episode, "The Case of the Final Fade-Out" (1966)

Warner Bros. produced a series of Perry Mason feature films in the 1930s, casting a succession of actors in the Mason role: Warren William in the first four, then Ricardo Cortez and Donald Woods in one film each. Warners dropped the series in 1937 but Gardner's novel The Case of the Dangerous Dowager went unfilmed until 1940: the movie version, Granny Get Your Gun, retained the Perry Mason plotline but the Mason character was removed from the film entirely.

The radio program Perry Mason ran from 1943 to 1955. In 1954, CBS proposed transforming Perry Mason into a TV soap opera. When Gardner opposed the idea, CBS created The Edge of Night, featuring John Larkin—who voiced Mason on the radio show—as a thinly veiled imitation of the Mason character.

In 1957, Perry Mason became a long-running CBS-TV courtroom drama series, starring Raymond Burr in the title role. Burr had auditioned for the role of the district attorney Hamilton Burger, but asked to read for the Mason role. Burr's performance as Mason was so intense and persuasive that Gardner, watching the screen test in a projection room, pointed at the screen and stated, "That's Perry Mason." Gardner made an uncredited appearance as a judge in "The Case of the Final Fade-Out" (1966), the last episode of the series.

== Gardner's other works ==
Beginning in 1937 with the novel The D. A. Calls It Murder, Gardner wrote a companion series reversing the format of the Mason books. The protagonist was the resolute district attorney Doug Selby, battling in court against devious attorney Alphonse Baker Carr. Prosecutor Selby is portrayed as a courageous and imaginative crime solver; his antagonist Carr is a wily shyster whose clients are invariably "as guilty as hell."

In 1939, under the pen name A. A. Fair, Gardner launched a series of novels about the private detective firm Cool and Lam.

After World War II Gardner also published a few short stories for the "glossies" (magazines) such as Collier's, Sports Afield, and Look, but most of his postwar magazine contributions were nonfiction articles on travel, Western history, and forensic science. Gardner's readership was a broad and international one, including the English novelist Evelyn Waugh, who in 1949 called Gardner the best living American writer. He also created characters for various radio programs, including Christopher London (1950), starring Glenn Ford, and A Life in Your Hands (1949–1952).

== Personal interests and causes ==
Gardner had a lifelong fascination with Baja California and wrote a series of nonfiction travel accounts describing his extensive explorations of the peninsula by boat, truck, airplane, and helicopter.

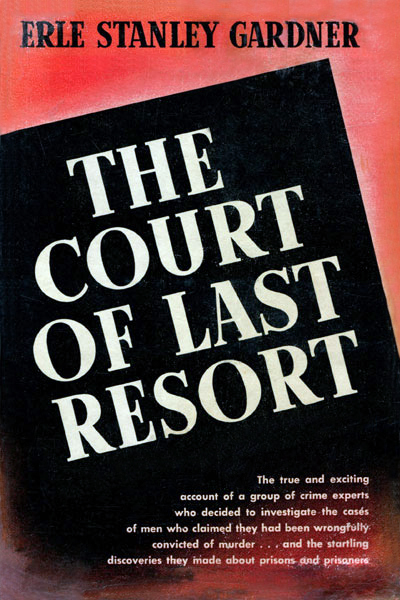
The Court of Last Resort (1952) earned Gardner his only Edgar Award, in the Best Fact Crime category.

Gardner devoted thousands of hours to the Court of Last Resort, in collaboration with his many friends in the forensic, legal, and investigative communities. The project sought to review and, when appropriate, reverse miscarriages of justice against criminal defendants who had been convicted because of poor legal representation, abuse, misinterpretation of forensic evidence, or careless or malicious actions of police or prosecutors. The resulting 1952 book earned Gardner his only Edgar Award, in the Best Fact Crime category, and was later made into a TV series, The Court of Last Resort.

== Personal life ==
In 1912, Gardner wed Natalie Frances Talbert (July 16, 1885 – February 26, 1968). Their only child, Natalie Grace Gardner (January 25, 1913 — February 29, 2004), was born in Ventura, California. Gardner and his wife separated in the early 1930s, but did not divorce, and in fact their marriage lasted 56 years, until Natalie's death in 1968. After that, Gardner married his secretary, Agnes "Jean" Bethell (née Walter; May 19, 1902 – December 5, 2002), the daughter of Ida Mary Elizabeth Walter (née Itrich; December 24, 1880 – March 3, 1961).

Through his daughter, Gardner had two grandchildren: Valerie Joan Naso (née McKittrick; August 19, 1941 – November 12, 2007) and Alan G. McKittrick.

Gardner's widow died in 2002, aged 100, in San Diego. She was a member of Jehovah's Witnesses. She was survived by her brother, Norman Walter.

== Death ==
Gardner died of cancer, diagnosed in the late 1960s, on March 11, 1970, at his ranch in Temecula. At the time of his death, he was the best-selling American writer of the 20th century. He died five days after William Hopper, who played private detective Paul Drake in the Perry Mason TV series. Gardner was cremated and his ashes scattered over his beloved Baja California peninsula. The ranch, known as Rancho del Paisano at the time, was sold after his death, then resold in 2001 to the Pechanga tribe, renamed Great Oak Ranch, and eventually absorbed into the Pechanga reservation.

== Legacy ==
The Harry Ransom Center at the University of Texas at Austin holds Gardner's manuscripts, art collection, and personal effects. From 1972 to 2010, the Ransom Center featured a full-scale reproduction of Gardner's study that displayed original furnishings, personal memorabilia, and artifacts. The space and a companion exhibition were dismantled, but a panoramic view of the study is available online.

In 2003, a new school in the Temecula Valley Unified School District was named Erle Stanley Gardner Middle School.

In December 2016, Hard Case Crime published The Knife Slipped, a Bertha Cool–Donald Lam mystery, which had been lost for 75 years. Written in 1939 as the second entry in the Cool and Lam series, the book was rejected at the time by Gardner's publisher. Published for the first time in 2016 as a trade paperback and ebook, the work garnered respectful reviews. In 2017, Hard Case Crime followed the publication of The Knife Slipped with a reissued edition of Turn On the Heat, the book Gardner wrote to replace The Knife Slipped, and published a new edition of The Count of Nine in October 2018.

== In popular culture ==
An unspecified article that Gardner wrote for True magazine is referred to by William S. Burroughs in his 1959 novel, Naked Lunch.

Gardner's name is well known among avid crossword puzzle solvers, because his first name contains an unusual series of common letters, starting and ending with the most common letter of the English alphabet, and because few other famous people have that name. As of January 2012, he is noted for having the highest ratio (5.31) of mentions in the New York Times crossword puzzle to mentions in the rest of the newspaper among all other people since 1993.

In 2001, Huell Howser Productions, in association with KCET, Los Angeles, featured Gardner's Temecula Rancho del Paisano in California's Gold. The 30-minute program is available as a VHS tape.
