= List of Perry Mason episodes =

This is a list of episodes for Perry Mason, an American legal drama series that aired on CBS television for nine seasons (September 21, 1957 – May 22, 1966). The title character, portrayed by Raymond Burr, is a fictional Los Angeles criminal defense lawyer who originally appeared in detective fiction by Erle Stanley Gardner. Many episodes are based on novels and short stories written by Gardner, with some stories having been adapted more than once.

== Series overview ==
Season	Episodes	Originally released	
Season	Episodes	First released	Last released
1	39	September 21, 1957	June 28, 1958
2	30	September 20, 1958	June 27, 1959
3	26	October 3, 1959	June 11, 1960
4	28	September 17, 1960	June 10, 1961
5	30	September 2, 1961	May 26, 1962
6	28	September 27, 1962	May 16, 1963
7	30	September 26, 1963	May 21, 1964
8	30	September 24, 1964	May 13, 1965
9	30	September 12, 1965	May 22, 1966

== Episodes ==
=== Season 1 (1957–58) ===
No. overall	No. in season	Title	Directed by	Written by	Based on	Original release date
1	1	"The Case of the Restless Redhead"	William D. Russell	Russell S. Hughes	1954 novel	September 21, 1957
Perry defends a waitress accused of killing a con man. Cast: Whitney Blake (Evelyn Bagby), Vaughn Taylor (Lewis Boles), Grandon Rhodes (Judge Kippen), Gloria Henry (Helene Chaney)
2	2	"The Case of the Sleepwalker's Niece"	William D. Russell	Laurence Marks, Gene Wang	1936 novel	September 28, 1957
Perry represents a sleepwalking businessman in a divorce case and must also defend him when the man's stepbrother and business partner is murdered. Cast: John McNamara (Peter Cole), John Archer (Frank Maddox), Darryl Hickman (Steve Harris), Hillary Brooke (Doris Cole) (Note: After seeing this episode, Erle Stanley Gardner wrote Gail Patrick Jackson: "I don't think I have ever seen a better show at any time on television than 'Sleepwalker's Niece' last Saturday night. I was so darned excited at how perfect it was I just couldn't settle down afterwards.—It had the suspense, intrigue and everything else one looks for and doesn't find in most plays and I kept wondering how on earth you ever chose every single actor so they were perfectly cast.—I saw the first one so imperfectly on a motel TV set that this is really my first one and I'm still thrilled whenever I think of it, and mentally say, 'Thank you, Gail, for everything you've done.'")
3	3	"The Case of the Nervous Accomplice"	William D. Russell	Stirling Silliphant	1955 novel	October 5, 1957
A woman's attempts to win back her unfaithful husband result in her being framed for the murder of the head of a real estate development company. Cast: Margaret Hayes (Sybil Granger), Greta Thyssen (Roxy Howard), Morris Ankrum (Judge Hoyt), Robert Cornthwaite (Herbert Dean)
4	4	"The Case of the Drowning Duck"	William D. Russell	Al C. Ward	1942 novel	October 12, 1957
Perry Mason, Della Street and Paul Drake head to a small town to defend a young man who is charged with poisoning a blackmailer. Cast: Nolan Leary (Judge Harry Meehan), Gary Vinson (Marv Adams), Carolyn Craig (Helen Waters), Don Beddoe (George Norris)
5	5	"The Case of the Sulky Girl"	Christian Nyby	Harold Swanton	1933 novel	October 19, 1957
An impetuous niece who demands her trust fund be released comes to Perry Mason for help. Cast: Olive Sturgess (Frances Celane), Brian G. Hutton (Rod Gleason), William Schallert (Graves)
6	6	"The Case of the Silent Partner"	Christian Nyby	Donald S. Sanford	1940 novel	October 26, 1957
The owner of a lucrative orchid business is charged with murder after her husband loses shares in the company to a sleazy ex-con in a poker game. Cast: Peggy Maley (Lola Florey), Anne Barton (Mildred Kimber)
7	7	"The Case of the Angry Mourner"	William D. Russell	Francis Cockrell	1951 novel	November 2, 1957
There's no rest for Perry Mason. While on vacation at his remote cabin, a woman in the area is charged with murdering a playboy. Cast: Sylvia Field (Belle Adrian), Barbara Eden (Carla Adrian), Paul Fix (District Attorney), Joan Weldon (Marion Keats)
8	8	"The Case of the Crimson Kiss"	Christian Nyby	Joel Murcott, Walter Doniger, Milton Geiger	1948 story	November 9, 1957
When a lipstick print is found on the forehead of a murder victim, Mason's client is charged with the crime, even though she and her roommate were poisoned and unconscious at the time. Cast: Jean Willes (Anita Bonsal), Sue England (Fay Allison), Frances Bavier (Louise Barlow)
9	9	"The Case of the Vagabond Vixen"	Christian Nyby	Al C. Ward	1948 novel (Note: Title changed from Gardner's original, The Case of the Vagabond Virgin)	November 16, 1957
A film mogul discovers that a pretty hitchhiker may be trying to blackmail him. And he has other worries...he's just been charged with murdering his rival. Cast: Robert Ellenstein (John Addison), Paul Cavanagh (Edgar Ferrell), Barbara Pepper (Martha Dale)
10	10	"The Case of the Runaway Corpse"	Christian Nyby	Malvin Wald, Jack Jacobs	1954 novel	November 23, 1957
Perry defends a wife suspected of killing her husband with arsenic, but the corpse disappears under the eyes of a doctor only to reappear miles away in a freshly dug grave. Cast: June Dayton (Myrna Davenport), John Stephenson (Ed Davenport)
11	11	"The Case of the Crooked Candle"	Christian Nyby	Robert Tallman	1944 novel	November 30, 1957 a #
12	12	"The Case of the Negligent Nymph"	Christian Nyby	Richard Grey	1950 novel	December 7, 1957
While on a fishing trip, Perry Mason pulls a beautiful woman out of the ocean. In her possession is a note she found, intended for her employer, accusing him of killing his rich relative. Cast: Peggie Castle (Sally Fenner), Joan Banks (Karen Alder)
13	13	"The Case of the Moth-Eaten Mink"	Ted Post	Laurence Marks, Ben Starr	1952 novel	December 14, 1957
Perry and Della's visit to a restaurant is interrupted when a waitress is shot at. After they hide her mink, they discover it contains a pawn ticket that may hold the key to a past murder. Cast: Robert Osterloh (Morey Allen), Kay Faylen (Dixie Dayton), Douglas Kennedy (Sergeant Jaffrey)
14	14	"The Case of the Baited Hook"	Christian Nyby	Richard Grey	1940 novel	December 21, 1957
Perry receives a phone call by a strange man saying someone has been murdered and he has $2,000 for a retainer and half of a $10,000 bill that will serve to introduce Perry's mysterious client. Cast: Judith Braun (Carol Stanley), Geraldine Wall (Abigail Leeds), Mary Castle (Enid Shaw)
15	15	"The Case of the Fan-Dancer's Horse"	William D. Russell	Stirling Silliphant	1947 novel	December 28, 1957
After a car accident, Perry Mason finds some fans and shoes that belong to a fan dancer. He places an ad that several people mistake for a missing horse. A fan dancer shows up, but so does her husband...dead. Cast: Susan Cummings (Lois Fenton Callender), Hugh Sanders (John Callender), Judy Tyler (Cherie Chi-Chi)
16	16	"The Case of the Demure Defendant"	Laslo Benedek	Ben Brady, Richard Grey	1956 novel	January 4, 1958
A young woman confesses to her psychiatrist on tape under a truth serum that she poisoned her uncle. Police believe Perry is responsible for evidence that has been tampered with and planted. Cast: Christine White (Nadine Marshall), Clem Bevans (Captain Hugo), Alexander Campbell (Martin Wellman)
17	17	"The Case of the Sun Bather's Diary"	Ted Post	Gene Wang	1955 novel	January 11, 1958
A woman's trailer was stolen as she was sunbathing, and inside, it contained her diary, which has the truth about a bank heist her father was convicted of. She asks for Perry's help. Cast: Susan Morrow (Arlene Dowling), Carl Betz (Dr. Ralph Chandler), Gertrude Michael (Helen Rucker), Ralph Moody (George L. Ballard), Peter Leeds (Bill Emory)
18	18	"The Case of the Cautious Coquette"	Laslo Benedek	Leo Townsend, Gene Wang	1949 novel	January 18, 1958
A woman is being threatened and blackmailed by her husband so she consults Perry. The husband later ends up dead. Cast: Virginia Gregg (Sheila Cromwell), Kipp Hamilton (Elaine Barton), James Seay (Ross Hollister), Harry Jackson (Harry Pitkin)
19	19	"The Case of the Haunted Husband"	Lewis Allen	Gene Wang	1941 novel	January 25, 1958
Della convinces Perry to take a case of a girl who was in a car accident and was framed for stealing the car and killing the driver of a truck. Two murders later and Perry is still trying to prove her innocence. Cast: Karen Steele (Doris Stephanak), Patricia Hardy (Claire Olger), John Hubbard (Michael Greeley)
20	20	"The Case of the Lonely Heiress"	Laslo Benedek	Donald S. Sanford	1948 novel	February 1, 1958
An heiress looks for the con man who swindled her sister through a lonely hearts magazine which lead to her sister's death. The heiress finds Charles Barnaby, who winds up dead and she is charged with his murder. Cast: Anna Navarro (Delores Coterro), L. Q. Jones (Charles Baker), Kathleen Crowley (Marilyn Cartwright), Gail Kobe (Margo)
21	21	"The Case of the Green-Eyed Sister"	Christian Nyby	Richard Grey	1953 novel	February 8, 1958
A woman comes to Perry for help because her ailing father is being blackmailed by a private investigator for embezzling. She is afraid if her fiancé finds out, he'll end their engagement. Cast: Virginia Vincent (Harriet Bain), Robin Hughes (Addison Doyle), James Bell (Jeremiah Hosiah Stanley), Morris Ankrum (Judge)
22	22	"The Case of the Fugitive Nurse"	Laslo Benedek	Al C. Ward, Gene Wang	1954 novel (Note: Also filmed in 1968 as "The Case of the Vanishing Victim" for episode #258)	February 15, 1958
A physician's wife is arrested for drugging her husband, apparently causing him to crash his private plane and perish. He later turns up alive and living in Mexico, after the dead man's true identity is revealed. Cast: Bethel Leslie (Janet Morris), Dabbs Greer (David Kirby), Jeanette Nolan (Angela Kirby), Shepperd Strudwick (Dr. Morris), Maxine Cooper (Gladys Strome), Woodrow Chambliss (Phil Reese)
23	23	"The Case of the One-Eyed Witness"	Christian Nyby	Robert C. Dennis	1950 novel	February 22, 1958
A woman is being blackmailed and hires Perry after seeing him at a French restaurant. When the supposed blackmailer and her husband are killed, she is charged with their murders. Cast: Angie Dickinson (Marian Fargo), Luis van Rooten (Samuel D. Carlin), Paul Picerni (Charles Gallagher), Dorothy Green (Diana Maynard)
24	24	"The Case of the Deadly Double"	Andrew V. McLaglen	Sam Neuman	N/A	March 1, 1958
Perry defends the brother of a woman whose purse contains his gun. She says that in her nightmare she saw her husband shot. Perry must prove the nightmare was real. Cast: Constance Ford (Helen Reed), Denver Pyle (Robert Crane), Murray Hamilton (John Davis Hale), Abraham Sofaer (Dr. Daniel Maitland)
25	25	"The Case of the Empty Tin"	Andrew V. McLaglen	Seeleg Lester	1941 novel	March 8, 1958
A woman attempting to claim an inheritance from a man she believes was her father is accused of murdering the original beneficiary who accused her of being a fraud. Cast: Toni Gerry (Doris Hocksley Jackson), Warren Stevens (Alan Neil), Anthony Jochim (Elston Carr), Olive Deering (Rebecca Gentrie)
26	26	"The Case of the Half-Wakened Wife"	Anton M. Leader	Stanley Niss	1945 novel	March 15, 1958
Perry defends an old wartime buddy who is framed for the murder of the husband of the woman with whom he is accused of having an affair. Cast: Phyllis Avery (Marion Shelby), Stewart Bradley (Frank Lawton), Tom Palmer (Scott Shelby), Claude Akins (Detective Sgt. Phillip Dix)
27	27	"The Case of the Desperate Daughter"	Arthur Hiller	Gene Wang	N/A	March 22, 1958
A teenage girl is having a fling with a shady East German who is an acquaintance of her stepmother. He is later murdered and the teen has been diagnosed with global amnesia. Cast: Gigi Perreau (Doris Bannister), Robert F. Simon (Edward Bannister), Werner Klemperer (Stefan Riker), Osa Massen (Lisa Bannister)
28	28	"The Case of the Daring Decoy"	Anton M. Leader	Seeleg Lester	1957 novel	March 29, 1958
A secretary who has been spying on an oil executive, is found murdered, apparently by the executive, who takes the gun. The star witness in the case is an elevator operator who identifies the suspect by their shoes. Cast: H.M. Wynant (Daniel Conway), Jack Weston (Fred Calvert), Jacqueline Scott (Amelia Armitage), Pamela Duncan (Rose Calvert), Johnny Mack Brown (Warner Griffith), Marie Windsor (Linda Griffith)
29	29	"The Case of the Hesitant Hostess"	Christian Nyby	Al C. Ward	1953 novel	April 5, 1958
A woman winds up dead after blackmailing a man. Perry's client is charged with the murder, and he has to depend on the murdered woman's friend to assist in the defense, but she double-crosses him at every turn. Cast: Karen Sharpe (Inez Kaylor), Fred Sherman (Albert Sanders), June Vincent (Martha Rayburn), Les Tremayne (Frederick Archer III), Fay Roope (Judge)
30	30	"The Case of the Screaming Woman"	Andrew V. McLaglen	Dick Stenger, Gene Wang	1957 novel	April 26, 1958
A nurse visits Perry for advice, but does not listen. She later confesses to the police to killing a columnist who was using a book stolen from a doctor to blackmail him into giving her a baby to be her own. Cast: Josephine Hutchinson (Leona Walsh), Marian Seldes (Mary K. Davis), Ruta Lee (Connie Cooper), Karin Booth (Susan Marshall)
31	31	"The Case of the Fiery Fingers"	Arthur Marks	Laurence Marks	1951 novel	May 3, 1958
A woman believes her husband is having an affair and will not allow him into her room. Only her cousin and nurse may see her. When she dies of arsenic poisoning, her nurse is charged with murder. Cast: Mary LaRoche (Victoria Braxton), Edward Norris (George Gordon), Lenore Shanewise (Nora Mae Quincy),Fay Spain (Charlotte Lynch), Charles Lane (Dr. Williams)
32	32	"The Case of the Substitute Face"	William D. Russell	Francis Cockrell	1938 novel	May 10, 1958
A wife is accused of shooting and pushing her bank accountant husband overboard on a cruise; complicated by the fact that he mysteriously "acquired" $100,000 in cash prior to the trip. When the bank reports no funds missing, Perry is determined to link the cryptic source of the $100,000 to the true motive for murder. Cast: Lurene Tuttle (Anna Houser), Joan Tabor (Evelyn Whiting), Theodore Newton (Carl Houser)
33	33	"The Case of the Long-Legged Models"	Anton M. Leader	Seeleg Lester	1958 novel	May 17, 1958
A gambler is murdered by a man who tries to collect a debt from the dead man's daughter. He is then murdered and the daughter is charged. Cast: Peggy McCay (Stephanie Falkner), Alix Talton (Eva Elliott), Joe De Santis (George Castle), Lyle Talbot (Michael Garvin Sr.)
34	34	"The Case of the Gilded Lily"	Andrew V. McLaglen	Richard Grey, Gene Wang	1956 novel	May 24, 1958
Perry defends his office building's owner when he is charged with the murder of a man blackmailing him over his new wife's past. Cast: Peggy Knudsen (Sheila Bowers), Barbara Baxley (Enid Griffin), Mari Aldon (Anne Brent), Grant Withers (Charles Stewart Brent), Richard Erdman (Arthur Binney), Wally Brown (Harry Mitchell)
35	35	"The Case of the Lazy Lover"	William D. Russell	Francis Cockrell	1947 novel	May 31, 1958
While moving his car in his driveway, the homeowner finds an unconscious acquaintance and it appears his stepdaughter struck the man as she was pulling into the driveway. A cover-up ensues which results in murder. Cast: Harry Townes (Robert Fleetwood), James Bell (P. E. Overbrook), Yvonne Craig (Patricia Faxon), Neil Hamilton (Bertrand Allred)
36	36	"The Case of the Prodigal Parent"	Arthur Marks	Seeleg Lester, Gene Wang	N/A	June 7, 1958
When a man is killed, his stepfather, who was recently divorced from the man's mother, is charged with the crime. His ex-wife asks Perry to defend him and then she disappears. Cast: Virginia Field (Irene Collaro), Fay Wray (Ethel Harrison), John Hoyt (Joseph Harrison), Herbert Rudley (George Durrell), Nancy Kulp (Sarah Winslow)
37	37	"The Case of the Black-Eyed Blonde"	Roger Kay	Gene Wang	1944 novel	June 14, 1958
A woman arrives at Perry's office with a black eye. She is concerned about her boss' grandson. The woman's former roommate is murdered and Perry's client is charged. Cast: Whitney Blake (Diana Reynolds), Irene Hervey (Helen Bartlett), R.G. Armstrong (Matthew Bartlett), Phyllis Coates (Norma Carter), Judith Ames (Marian Shaw)
38	38	"The Case of the Terrified Typist"	Andrew V. McLaglen	Robert C. Dennis, Philip MacDonald, Ben Brady	1956 novel	June 21, 1958
A terrified typist rushes into Perry's office pretending to be a temp, as the office of the diamond importers on the floor above Perry's office has been invaded and a partner killed. Another partner is charged with the crime. Cast: Alan Marshal (James Kincaid), Joanna Moore (Patricia Taylor), Ben Wright (Walter Lumis), Jack Raine (George Baxter),
39	39	"The Case of the Rolling Bones"	Roger Kay	Gene Wang	1939 novel	June 28, 1958
A man is forcibly placed in a mental sanitarium. Perry takes the case and wins the man's freedom on a writ of habeas corpus. Before the writ can be served, the man escapes and is charged with murder. Cast: Edgar Stehli (Daniel Reed), Arthur Space (Willard Scott), Richard Gaines (Judge Treadwell), Morris Ankrum (Judge Morrisey)

=== Season 2 (1958–59) ===
No. overall	No. in season	Title	Directed by	Written by	Based on	Original release date
40	1	"The Case of the Corresponding Corpse"	Arthur Marks	Don Brinkley, Gene Wang	N/A	September 20, 1958
A man who faked his death is being blackmailed. He wants Perry to help him return his wife, but he is found dead and the woman he had a relationship with is charged with his murder. Cast: Joan Camden (Ruth Whittaker), Vaughn Taylor (Harry Folsom), Jeanne Cooper (Laura Beaumont), William Ching (Glenn McKay), Ross Elliott (George Hartley Beaumont), Lillian Bronson (Judge)
41	2	"The Case of the Lucky Loser"	William D. Russell	Seeleg Lester	1957 novel	September 27, 1958
Perry is hired to defend a man who faces a murder charge for shooting a man after pleading guilty of vehicular manslaughter in the same death. Cast: Patricia Medina (Harriet Balfour), Bruce Bennett (Lawrence Balfour), Heather Angel (Florence Ingle), Douglas Kennedy (Steven Boles), Richard Hale (Addison Balfour), Woodrow Chambliss (Fred Haley)
42	3	"The Case of the Pint-Sized Client"	Buzz Kulik	Herman Epstein	N/A	October 4, 1958
A teenage boy seeks Perry's legal help after finding the loot from a robbery. His grandfather is later charged with grand theft and murder. Cast: Nita Talbot (Iris Anderson), Elisha Cook, Jr. (Art Crowley), Bobby Clark (Nicky Renzi)
43	4	"The Case of the Sardonic Sergeant"	William D. Russell	Samuel Newman	N/A	October 11, 1958
An Army sergeant is accused of murdering a payroll officer. Cast: John Dehner (Major Lewis), Paul Picerni (Sgt. Joseph Dexter), BarBara Luna (Rikki Stevens), Kevin Hagen (Sgt. Burke)
44	5	"The Case of the Curious Bride"	Arthur Marks	Jonathan Latimer	1934 novel	October 18, 1958
A woman is blackmailed for a past indiscretion which she would like to keep from her husband and his overbearing father. When the blackmailer turns up dead, the woman is charged with his murder. Cast: Christine White (Rhoda Reynolds), Casey Adams (Carl Reynolds), John Hoyt (Philip Reynolds), Peggy Maley (Edna Freeman), S. John Launer (Judge)
45	6	"The Case of the Buried Clock"	William D. Russell	Francis Cockrell	1943 novel	November 1, 1958
A man steals $100,000 from the bank where he works. While investigating, Drake discovers the man's father-in-law rifling through his home and the man found dead. Cast: Don Beddoe (Doctor Blane), Fredd Wayne (Jack Hardisty), June Dayton (Sue Hardisty), Paul Fix (District Attorney), Charles Cooper (Philip Strague)
46	7	"The Case of the Married Moonlighter"	Arthur Marks	Stanley Niss, Gene Wang	N/A	November 8, 1958
A schoolteacher holds a second job at a diner. When a man who flashed a wad of cash is robbed and killed, the schoolteacher is charged with the crime. Cast: Arthur Franz (Danny Harrison), Jesse White (Luke Hickey), Anne Sargent (Eileen Harrison), Stacy Harris (Frank Curran)
47	8	"The Case of the Jilted Jockey"	William D. Russell	Robert Warnes Leach, Seeleg Lester	N/A	November 15, 1958
A jockey's wife tries to persuade him to throw a race for a gambler with whom she is having an affair. When the gambler is killed, the jockey is charged with murder. Cast: Billy Pearson (Tic Barton), Barbara Lawrence (Gloria Barton), June Vincent (Victoria Bannion), Don Durant (Johnny Starr), Kenneth MacDonald (Judge Carter)
48	9	"The Case of the Purple Woman"	Gerd Oswald	Robert Bloomfield, Gene Wang	N/A	December 6, 1958
An art collector has bought a famous painting, but the painting may be a forgery and the art dealer's wife consults Perry regarding the suspected fraud. Cast: George Macready (Milo Gerard), Bethel Leslie (Evelyn Girard), Robert H. Harris (Aaron Hubble), Doris Singleton (Doris Andrews)
49	10	"The Case of the Fancy Figures"	Arthur Hiller	Barry Trivers, Gene Wang	N/A	December 13, 1958
A man is serving time for embezzlement, a charge he denies. New evidence emerges that casts doubt on his conviction so his wife consults Perry. Cast: Frank Silvera (Jonathan Hyett), Joan Banks (Valerie Brewster), William Phipps (Martin Ellis), Ralph Clanton (Charles Brewster), S. John Launer (Judge)
50	11	"The Case of the Perjured Parrot"	William D. Russell	Marion Cockrell	1939 novel	December 20, 1958
The only witness to a man's murder is a parrot who keeps repeating the suspect's name. Cast: Edgar Buchanan (Andy Templet), Jody Lawrance (Ellen Monteith), Fay Baker (Stephanie Sabin), Robert E. Griffin (Fred Bascomb), Frank Ferguson (Sheriff Barnes), Joseph Kearns (Edward Langley), Maurice Manson (Arthur Sabin), voice of Mel Blanc
51	12	"The Case of the Shattered Dream"	Andrew V. McLaglen	Robert Bloomfield, Seeleg Lester	N/A	January 3, 1959
A diamond cutter convinces a woman to let him sell her diamond. He sells the diamond, but swindles the diamond's owner out of her share and he later turns up dead. Cast: Osa Massen (Sarah Werner), Virginia Vincent (Virginia Trent), Kurt Kreuger (Hugo Werner), Ludwig Stössel (Adolph Van Beers)
52	13	"The Case of the Borrowed Brunette"	Arthur Marks	Seeleg Lester	1946 novel	January 10, 1959
An attractive brunette poses as another woman. She takes the job and is chaperoned by her Aunt. The women find the man who hired them dead and are charged with murder. Cast: Maggie Mahoney (Eva Martell), Sheila Bromley (Agnes Nulty), John Stephenson (Grant Reynolds), Joe De Santis (Melvin Slater), Morris Ankrum (Judge Bates)
53	14	"The Case of the Glittering Goldfish"	Gerd Oswald	Milton Krims	N/A	January 17, 1959
A team discovers a cure for gill fever and as they plan to market the product, they find that a man has bought the business and owns all their patents and intellectual property. The man is murdered and one of the team is charged with the crime. Cast: Cecil Kellaway (Darrell Metcalfe), May Wynn (Donna Sherwood), John Hudson (Tom Wyatt), Jacqueline Scott (Sally Wilson), Gage Clarke (Frederick Rollins), Murvyn Vye (Jackson Huxley)
54	15	"The Case of the Foot-Loose Doll"	William D. Russell	Jonathan Latimer	1958 novel	January 24, 1959
Framed for embezzlement by her fiance, a woman decides to flee. While traveling, she picks up another woman who causes them to have a car accident. The woman who caused the accident is killed, so the fleeing woman assumes her identity, but finds she has walked into a scandal. Cast: Barton MacLane (Senator Harriman Baylor), Robert Bray (Carl Davis), Ruta Lee (Mildred Crest), Betty Lou Gerson (Marjory Davis), Eve McVeagh (Laura Richards), Helene Stanley (Fern Driscoll)
55	16	"The Case of the Fraudulent Foto"	Arthur Marks	Lawrence L. Goldman, Seeleg Lester	N/A	February 7, 1959
The D.A. is investigating graft in a hospital project. The woman he meets with to obtain proof disrobes and kisses him as a photographer takes a picture. It is sent to a political fixer who is murdered. Cast: Hugh Marlowe (Brander Harris), Carole Mathews (Leora Mathews), Wilton Graff (Cleveland Blake), Bartlett Robinson (Marshall Scott), Kenneth MacDonald (Judge), Herbert Anderson (Eugene Milton)
56	17	"The Case of the Romantic Rogue"	William D. Russell	Gene Wang	N/A	February 14, 1959
A man gives a woman his mother's cameo as an engagement gift, but the woman finds out that he is a con man and she is later charged in the murder of a con woman that had tried to work with her former beau. Cast: Marion Ross (Helen Harvey), Peggy Maley (Margo Lawrence), Jean Willes (Irene Wallace), Frederic Worlock (Judge)
57	18	"The Case of the Jaded Joker"	Gerd Oswald	Milton Krims	N/A	February 21, 1959
A fading funnyman has been promised a television show. The executive who promised him the show double-crosses him and pitches the show to another talent instead. Cast: Frankie Laine (Danny Ross), Bobby Troup (Buzzie), Walter Burke (Freddie Green), Mary LaRoche (Lisa Hiller), Martha Vickers (Sheila Hayes)
58	19	"The Case of the Caretaker's Cat"	Arthur Marks	Richard Macaulay, Seeleg Lester	1935 novel	March 7, 1959
A man decides to test his heirs' loyalties and he pretends to change his will to leave his estate to his caretaker, who is supposed to burn down the man's house with a medical cadaver in it. Cast: Benson Fong (James Hing), John Agar (Kenneth Baxter), Maxine Cooper (Edith Devoe), Judy Lewis (Winifred Oakley), Raymond Bailey (John Hilliard), Bill Erwin (A.J. Nelson)
59	20	"The Case of the Stuttering Bishop"	William D. Russell	Gene Wang	1936 novel	March 14, 1959
A bishop searches for a young woman who may be the heiress to a $1,000,000 estate. He is beaten by a man and his henchman to try to persuade him to drop the search. Cast: Vaughn Taylor (Bishop Arthur Mallory), Rebecca Welles (Carol Delaney), Joan Vohs (Janice Burroughs), Carl Benton Reid (Charles Burroughs)
60	21	"The Case of the Lost Last Act"	Gerd Oswald	Milton Krims	N/A	March 21, 1959
An ex-gangster decides to pull out of a play an author is basing on a real-life, mob-related killing. His threatening request to the playwright is recorded so when the playwright is murdered, he is charged with the murder. Cast: Jerome Cowan (Ernest Royce), Stacy Harris (Frank Brooks), Robert McQueeney (Michael Dwight), Richard Gaines (Judge)
61	22	"The Case of the Bedeviled Doctor"	Arthur Marks	Gene Wang	N/A	April 4, 1959
A doctor records his patients' sessions on tape and when one of his patients reveals an affair on one of the tapes, the patient's wife goes to a mobster to buy a copy of the tape from the brother of the doctor's nurse. Cast: Dick Foran (Dr. David Craig), Andrea King (Barbara Heywood), Frederic Worlock (Judge)
62	23	"The Case of the Howling Dog"	William D. Russell	Seeleg Lester	1934 novel	April 11, 1959
A divorced woman escapes a sanitarium to retrieve money stolen by her ex-husband who is now married to her brother's ex-wife. Her brother handles the problem, but decides he wants his ex back. When the ex-husband is found murdered, the woman is charged with the crime. Cast: Ann Rutherford (Evelyn Forbes), Fintan Meyler (Thelma Brent), Robert Ellenstein (Arthur Cartright), Gregory Walcott (Bill Johnson), Vito Scotti (Joseph D'Amato)
63	24	"The Case of the Calendar Girl"	Arthur Marks	Seeleg Lester	1958 novel	April 18, 1959
A contractor meets with a political strongman about resolving the inspection problems on the job. As he leaves, the contractor sideswipes a car, throwing a young woman into the driveway. Cast: Dolores Donlon (Dawn Manning), John Anderson (George Andrews), Dean Harens (Frank Fettridge), George N. Neise (Wilfred Borden)
64	25	"The Case of the Petulant Partner"	William D. Russell	Milton Krims, Gene Wang	N/A	April 25, 1959
Partners are at odds with each other over one partner's marriage to a gold digger. Perry is consulted, who advises dissolving the partnership. When the alleged gold digger is killed, the husband's partner is charged with murder. Cast: R. G. Armstrong (Harry Bright), William H. Wright (Chuck Clark), Francis McDonald (Salty Sims), Geraldine Wall (Nell Gridley), Nan Leslie (Margaret Clark), Myron Healey (Howard Roper)
65	26	"The Case of the Dangerous Dowager"	Buzz Kilik	Milton Krims	1937 novel	May 9, 1959
A compulsive gambler meets with a casino man to repay her IOUs. Her husband wishes to acquire them as evidence in a suit for custody of their son. The casino man is killed with the woman's gun and she is charged with murder. Cast: Robert Strauss (Danny Barker), Patricia Cutts (Sylvia Oxman), Barry Atwater (Robert Benson), Ellen Corby (Old Lady Card Player)
66	27	"The Case of the Deadly Toy"	William D. Russell	Seeleg Lester	1959 novel	May 16, 1959
A woman contacts Perry for help after a man sends her threatening letters and assaults her boyfriend. When the man is found shot, she is charged the crime. Cast: Mala Powers (Claire Allison), Max Adrian (Ralph Jennings), Dennis Patrick (Martin Selkirk), Jennifer Howard (Lorraine Selkirk Jennings), Nancy Kulp (Katherine Collins)
67	28	"The Case of the Spanish Cross"	Arthur Marks	Robert J. Shaw, Gene Wang	N/A	May 30, 1959
A young delinquent with a criminal record for grand theft is believed to have stolen a jeweled cross owned by his boss. When his boss is found dead, the young man is charged and Perry defends him. Cast: Josephine Hutchinson (Miriam Baker), Peter Miles (Jimmy Morrow Jr.), Donald Randolph (Curtis Runyan), Richard Gaines (Judge)
68	29	"The Case of the Dubious Bridegroom"	William D. Russell	Milton Krims	1949 novel	June 13, 1959
A lovely blonde hops over the wall onto Perry's office terrace. When he confronts her, she says she is the secretary next door. Next door, the majority stockholder of the business is in a proxy fight with his ex-wife. Cast: Betsy Jones-Moreland (Lorrie Garvin), Joan Tabor (Helen Bynum), K. T. Stevens (Ethel Garvin), Thomas Browne Henry (George Denby), Neil Hamilton (Frank Livesey)
69	30	"The Case of the Lame Canary"	Arthur Marks	Seeleg Lester	1937 novel	June 27, 1959
A man tries to extort his wife for all of her money to give her a divorce. As she leaves, a truck almost runs her down and instead crashes into a car and injures the occupant. The woman runs to a friend for support, but when she returns home, she finds her husband dead. Cast: James Philbrook (Harry Jonson), Susan Cummings (Margaret Swaine), William Kendis (Walter Prescott), Berry Kroeger (Ernest Wray), S. John Launer (Judge)

=== Season 3 (1959–60) ===
No. overall	No. in season	Title	Directed by	Written by	Based on	Original release date	Prod. code
70	1	"The Case of the Spurious Sister"	Arthur Marks	Maurice Zimm	N/A	October 3, 1959	171-81
A couple have marital trouble because of the wife's compulsive gambling. After her husband cuts off her funds and leaves town, she blackmails her former husband and his wife. Cast: Karl Weber (Bruce Chapman), Mary LaRoche (Grace Norwood), Peggy Knudsen (Marie Chapman), James Seay (Ralph Hibberly), S. John Launer (Judge)
71	2	"The Case of the Watery Witness"	Richard Kinon	Jackson Gillis	N/A	October 10, 1959	171-85
A detective questions a movie actress whether she gave birth 25 years earlier to a daughter who was put up for adoption. Cast: Fay Wray (Lorna Thomas), Douglas Dick (Fred Bushmiller), Malcolm Atterbury (Dennis Briggs), Lester Vail (Tony Raeburn), John Bryant (George Clark), Charles J. Conrad (Judge), Ned Glass (Mr. Smith)
72	3	"The Case of the Garrulous Gambler"	Walter Grauman	Gene Wang	N/A	October 17, 1959	171-83
When a poker player is caught cheating, a scuffle ensues and a gun goes off leaving the poker player dead. Cast: Dick Foran (Steve Benton), Paula Raymond (Doris Shackley), Steve Brodie (Ben Wallace)
73	4	"The Case of the Blushing Pearls"	Richard B. Whorf	Jonathan Latimer	N/A	October 24, 1959	171-82
A man has a woman arrested for switching his wife's string of expensive blush pearls, but offers to absolve her if she breaks off her relationship with his son. Her uncle who made the pearls is later murdered. Cast: Nobu McCarthy (Mitsou Kamuri), Christine White (Alice Carson), George Takei (Toma Sakai), Ralph Dumke (Hudson Nichols), Rollin Moriyama (Ito Kamuri)
74	5	"The Case of the Startled Stallion"	William D. Russell	Jonathan Latimer	N/A	October 31, 1959	171-86
A woman marries a disabled man "John Brant", but the bridegroom is really an actor. Through a series of crafty moves, the real John Brant has gained control of everything the woman and her brother have inherited. Cast: Paul Richards (Earl Mauldin), Elliott Reid (Terry Blanchard), Trevor Bardette (John Brant), Patricia Hardy (Jo Ann Blanchard), Don Dillaway (Charley Cass)
75	6	"The Case of Paul Drake's Dilemma"	William D. Russell	Story by : Al C. Ward; Teleplay by : Jackson Gillis	N/A	November 14, 1959	171-88
Perry finds himself defending Paul against a charge of murder. It all began when a man hit a pedestrian walking on the side of the road and kills him. He hires Paul to payoff the widow. Cast: Bruce Gordon (Frank Thatcher), Dean Harens (Tad Dameron), Jennifer Howard (Judith Thatcher), Sheila Bromley (Mrs. Colin), Kenneth MacDonald (Judge)
76	7	"The Case of the Golden Fraud"	Herbert Hirschman	Story by : Robert C. Dennis; Teleplay by : Robert C. Dennis & Maurice Zimm	N/A	November 21, 1959	171-89
A woman hires someone to bug her apartment to make a bogus tape as a joke. She asks a man over to explain an investment prospectus. He discovers the bug and makes threatening remarks, but the woman blames it on her husband. Cast: Arthur Franz (Richard Vanaman), June Dayton (Frances Vanaman), Neil Hamilton (Henry Noble), Patricia Huston (Doris Petrie), Joyce Meadows (Sylvia Welles)
77	8	"The Case of the Bartered Bikini"	Arthur Hiller	Story by : Jerome Ross & Jackson Gillis; Teleplay by : Jackson Gillis	N/A	December 5, 1959	171-91
A model is charged with murdering a fashion designer after trying to recover documents showing they had an affair. She was also found with drawings of new fashions which were being stolen from the company to make knockoffs. Cast: June Vincent (Madge Wainwright), Terry Huntingdon (Kitty Wynne), Stephen Bekassy (Rick Stassi), John Anderson (Bud Ferrand), William Idelson (Ellis)
78	9	"The Case of the Artful Dodger"	Arthur Marks	Story by : Robert C. Dennis; Teleplay by : Robert C. Dennis & Jackson Gillis	N/A	December 12, 1959	171-90
A man's aunt comes to Los Angeles to find out why he won't pay her the monthly stipend. He is scheming to cheat other people out of their money at the same time he comes into his full inheritance. Cast: William J. Campbell (Allen Sheridan), Patricia Donahue (Joyce Fulton), Lurene Tuttle (Sarette Winslow), Jerome Cowan (Victor Latimore), Peter Leeds (Lou Caporale), Nelson Leigh (Judge)
79	10	"The Case of the Lucky Legs"	William D. Russell	Robert Bloomfield	1934 novel	December 19, 1959	171-84
A woman's boyfriend accuses a show's producer of running a bogus contest after his girlfriend is named "Lucky Legs". She goes to Hollywood anyway and disappears, followed by the producer's murder. Cast: John Archer (James R. Brandbury), Jeanne Cooper (Thelma Bell), Douglas Evans (Frank Patton)
80	11	"The Case of the Violent Village"	William D. Russell	Story by : Sam Elkin; Teleplay by : Sam Elkin & Seeleg Lester	N/A	January 2, 1960	171-92
A man returns from a year in prison for vehicular manslaughter of the sheriff's daughter. His wife forgives him, although the people of the town despise him. He is then charged when the sheriff's other daughter is killed. Cast: Barton MacLane (Sheriff Eugene Norris), Ann Rutherford (Judith Thurston), Jacqueline Scott (Kathi Beecher), Bart Burns (Norm Thurston)
81	12	"The Case of the Frantic Flyer"	Arthur Marks	Story by : Robert Bloomfield; Teleplay by : Robert Bloomfield & Seeleg Lester	N/A	January 9, 1960	171-87
A man and his mistress plan to rob a company, blame the owner's son, and then fake the man's death. The woman schemes with another man to do a double-cross. Plans go amiss and the owner's wife is charged with murder. Cast: Patricia Barry (Janice Atkins), Simon Oakland (Harold Walters), Rebecca Welles (Carol Taylor), James Bell (Zachary Davis), Richard Gaines (Judge)
82	13	"The Case of the Wayward Wife"	Walter Grauman	William O'Farrell	N/A	January 23, 1960	171-93
Walking down the street, a cynical, crippled ex-POW Korean War veteran Arthur Poe is shocked to see a book about the war displayed, 'written' by Ben Sutton who was with him in the war. The book is a bestseller, but is actually based on a [stolen] diary the veteran kept in the war. In a twist ending Poe reveals a shocking secret. Cast: Marshall Thompson (Arthur Poe), Bethel Leslie (Sylvia Sutton), Frank Maxwell (Harry Scott Wilson), Madlyn Rhue (Marian Ames), Richard Shannon (Ben Sutton),
83	14	"The Case of the Prudent Prosecutor"	Robert Ellis Miller	Jackson Gillis	N/A	January 30, 1960	171-95
Perry takes on the case of a man who is referred to him by none other than D.A. Hamilton Burger. The D.A. officially removes himself from anything to do with the case. Cast: J. Pat O'Malley (Jefferson Pike), Ruta Lee (Vita Culver), Walter Coy (Denver Leonard), Dabbs Greer (Hal Kirkwood), Frank Albertson (Duck Hunter)
84	15	"The Case of the Gallant Grafter"	Arthur Marks	Sy Salkowitz	N/A	February 6, 1960	171-96
The CEO of a company is in a proxy fight with another officer with a bad reputation. The CEO is forced to grant his wife a divorce to get her proxies and his opponent has the books checked which turns up a huge theft and a murder. Cast: Herbert Rudley (Edward Nelson), Phillip Terry (Robert Doniger),
85	16	"The Case of the Wary Wildcatter"	William D. Russell	Robert Bloomfield	N/A	February 20, 1960	171-94
A man is caught on camera killing his wife by pushing her over a cliff in a car. The photographer blackmails the man as the man cons others by overselling ownership in a wildcat well before being murdered himself. Cast: Douglas Kennedy (Lucky Sterling), Barbara Bain (Madelyn Terry), Byron Palmer (Charles Houston), Lori March (Paula Wallace)
86	17	"The Case of the Mythical Monkeys"	Gerald Mayer	Jonathan Latimer	1959 novel	February 27, 1960	171-97
A novelist sends her secretary to pick up a package at a remote cabin, but in the rain her car becomes stuck. At the cabin, a man denies knowing anything about the package, but allows her to dry off. He then disappears and she finds a body. Cast: Beverly Garland (Mauvis Meade), Louise Fletcher (Gladys Doyle), Joan Banks (Viola Pedley Manley), Norman Fell (Casper Pedley), Bill Erwin (Morrison Findlay)
87	18	"The Case of the Singing Skirt"	Arthur Marks	Jackson Gillis	1959 novel	March 12, 1960	171-98
A man pays a casino manager $60,000 to settle his losses and the only witness to the game is the singing cigarette girl. When the man's wife is killed, the cigarette girl is charged. Cast: Joan O'Brien (Betty Roberts), H. M. Wynant (Slim Marcus)
88	19	"The Case of the Bashful Burro"	Robert Ellis Miller	Jonathan Latimer	N/A	March 26, 1960	171-100
Perry, while looking for a witness, runs into a young couple working a gold mine. Their neighbor wants to buy the property, but they refuse to sell. When the neighbor is murdered, the young owner is charged. Cast: Ray Stricklyn (Gerald Norton), Ben Wright (Crawford Wright), Hugh Sanders (Ken Bascombe), Wendell Holmes (District Attorney Williams) William Talman receives billing in this episode, but does not appear. He was temporarily let go from the series after the filming of this episode had been completed, and would be absent for this and the following five episodes. He would return for "The Case of the Irate Inventor" only because it (and the three subsequent Perry Mason episodes, spilling into season 4) had been filmed prior to this one.
89	20	"The Case of the Crying Cherub"	William D. Russell	Jonathan Latimer	N/A	April 9, 1960	171-104
When a Matisse painting is stolen from a museum, the finger is pointed at an assistant in the museum whose boyfriend is an artist. The man's estranged wife tries to blackmail the museum owner, but is murdered after a fight. Cast: Joe Maross (David Lambert), Mala Powers (June Sinclair), Carmen Phillips (Liza Carson Lambert), Isabel Randolph (Mrs. Vandercord)
90	21	"The Case of the Nimble Nephew"	Richard Kinon	Story by : Sy Salkowitz; Teleplay by : Sy Salkowitz & Seeleg Lester	N/A	April 23, 1960	171-105
A developer sets up a trap to catch one of his nephews who he suspects of stealing information. When the trap catches no one, but the information leaks, he turns to Perry who finds the thief dead in a garage. Cast: William H. Wright (Adam Thompson), Bert Convy (Harry Thompson), Crahan Denton (Frank Jarrett)
91	22	"The Case of the Madcap Modiste"	William D. Russell	Harold Swanton	N/A	April 30, 1960	171-106
A fashion designer on live TV negates a deal her husband brokered with another firm. Later, before their fashion show, she drinks some champagne provided by her husband and shortly falls to the floor saying she was poisoned by him. Cast: John Conte (Charles Pierce), Marie Windsor (Flavia Halliday Pierce), Leslie Parrish (Hope Sutherland), David White (Henry De Garmo)
92	23	"The Case of the Slandered Submarine"	Arthur Marks	Samuel Newman	N/A	May 14, 1960	171-107
Perry defends a submariner in military court of two murders, one of them being his wife and the other being an officer. Cast: Hugh Marlowe (Commander James Page), Robert F. Simon (Anthony M. Beldon), Jack Ging (Seaman Robert Chapman), Mort Mills (Barry Scott), Robert H. Harris (Gordon Russell), Edward Platt (Commander Driscoll), Ann Robinson (Vivian Page), Herb Vigran (Ernest Pritchard)
93	24	"The Case of the Ominous Outcast"	Arthur Hiller	Jackson Gillis	N/A	May 21, 1960	171-108
A man travels to Outcast to thank a man who donated to the orphanage where he was raised. When the man he came to thank is murdered, he is charged with the crime. Cast: Robert Emhardt (J. J. Flaherty), Jeremy Slate (Bob Lansing), Maggie Hayes (Vivian Bell), Denver Pyle (Tom Quincy), Walter Burke (James Blackburn), Irene Tedrow (Amy Douglas)
94	25	"The Case of the Irate Inventor"	Gerald Mayer	Francis Rosenwald & Marianne Moser	N/A	May 28, 1960	171-101
An inventor thinks his wife is having an affair so he leaves for three months to work on his aircraft anti-collision device. When he returns home, he finds his locked workshop in flames and his wife inside, dead from a gunshot wound. Cast: Kasey Rogers (Lois Langley), Kenneth MacDonald (Judge)
95	26	"The Case of the Flighty Father"	William D. Russell	Jackson Gillis	N/A	June 11, 1960	171-102
After funeral services for a woman, her daughter meets a man who claims to be her father. The family head is blind and cannot identify the man. Cast: Hayden Rorke (Jay Holbrooke), Francis X. Bushman (Lawrence King), Tom Fadden (Gus Nickels)

=== Season 4 (1960–61) ===
No. overall	No. in season	Title	Directed by	Written by	Based on	Original release date	Prod. code
96	1	"The Case of the Treacherous Toupée"	Richard Kinon	Maurice Zimm	N/A	September 17, 1960	171-103
An executive who has been "missing" for two years returns on the day of an important stockholders' meeting and ends up being slain. Cast: Philip Ober (Peter Dawson), Thomas B. Henry (Hartley Bassett), Robert Redford (Richard Hart), Nelson Olmsted (Arthur Colemar), Frank Wilcox (Judge)
97	2	"The Case of the Credulous Quarry"	William D. Russell	Sy Salkowitz	N/A	September 24, 1960	171-99
A shady lawyer, a client facing a murder charge and a woman demanding a payoff help complicate this case for Mason. Cast: Vinton Hayworth (Marvin Claridge), Walter Reed (Alexander Hill), Willis Bouchey (Judge) Willam Talman is temporarily fired from the series after this episode, returning next after a break of 13 episodes in "The Case of the Fickle Fortune".
98	3	"The Case of the Ill-Fated Faker"	Charles Haas	Story by : Edward J. Lasko; Teleplay by : Jackson Gillis	N/A	October 1, 1960	171-110
Perry is hired by a harassed business executive who wants to rid himself of a larcenous, freeloading nephew. Cast: William Campbell (Jim Ferris), June Dayton (Alice Gorman), Sue Randall (Betty Wilkins), James Anderson (Stan Piper)
99	4	"The Case of the Singular Double"	Arthur Marks	Story by : Milton Gelman; Teleplay by : Seeleg Lester	N/A	October 8, 1960	171-109
Perry is hired by a distressed girl who assumed the identity of a non-existent cousin to report her own disappearance as a suspected suicide. Cast: Harry Townes (A.D.A. Grosvenor Cutter), Connie Hines (Lucy Stevens/Carole Morgan), Arch Johnson (John Ruskin), Andrea King (Catherine Locke), Mary Webster (Marjorie Rals)
100	5	"The Case of the Lavender Lipstick"	James Sheldon	Jonathan Latimer	N/A	October 15, 1960	171-111
Perry takes the case of a female chemist accused of slaying her employer when planted evidence is found to indicate that she had sold secret formulas to a rival cosmetics firm. Cast: Joe Maross (A.D.A. Ernest Helming), Pat Breslin (Karen Lewis), Dabbs Greer (Charles Knudsen), Whit Bissell (Max Pompey)
101	6	"The Case of the Wandering Widow"	William F. Claxton	Robert C. Dennis	N/A	October 22, 1960	171-112
Perry is hired by a woman who is being blackmailed by a long-missing witness in the six-year-old murder of her husband. Cast: Coleen Gray (Lorraine McClaine Kendall), Dean Harens (Riley Morgan), Marguerite Chapman (Faye Donner), Casey Adams (Burt Stokes), Stephen Talbot (Jimmie Kendall), Robert Carson (Prison Warden)
102	7	"The Case of the Clumsy Clown"	Andrew V. McLaglen	Samuel Newman	N/A	November 5, 1960	171-113
Perry is hired by a circus clown to untangle a case of bigamy and head off a threat of blackmail. Cast: Chana Eden (Lisa Franklin), Douglas Henderson (Felix Heidemann), Maggie Hayes (Joyce Gilbert), Walter Sande (Judson Curtis), Robert Clarke (Gerald Franklin), Ken Curtis (Tim Durant).
103	8	"The Case of the Provocative Protégé"	Laslo Benedek	Story by : Herman Epstein; Teleplay by : Herman Epstein & Seeleg Lester	N/A	November 12, 1960	171-115
Perry is hired by a distinguished concert pianist's widow to determine whether the musician's fatal plunge of a cliff was suicide or murder. Cast: Virginia Field (Anita Carpenter), Robert Lowery (Andrew Collis), Kathie Browne (Donna Ross).
104	9	"The Case of the Nine Dolls"	William F. Claxton	Jonathan Latimer	N/A	November 19, 1960	171-116
A little girl's plaintive request for help in learning who she is leads Perry into an international quest and a murder trial. Cast: Maggie Mahoney (Linda Osborne), Jeanette Nolan (Martha Benson), Gage Clarke (Edgar Benson), Francis X. Bushman (Courtney Jeffers), John Banner (A. Tobler), Eleanor Audley (Headmistress Lorimer)
105	10	"The Case of the Loquacious Liar"	Arthur Marks	Michael Morris	N/A	December 3, 1960	171-114
A man is out to take control of the company once owned by his new wife's late husband. He is found murdered and his wife's son is charged with the crime. Cast: Bruce Gordon (Judson Bailey), Lurene Tuttle (Emma Bailey), Wynn Pearce (Lester Martin), Regis Toomey (Sam Crane), Dorothy Adams (Wilma Stone), George E. Stone (Court Clerk)
106	11	"The Case of the Red Riding Boots"	Laslo Benedek	Harold Swanton	N/A	December 10, 1960	171-117
Everyone is against a man marrying Rita Conover, especially his daughter. When his fiancée is murdered, the family tries to cover for one another. Cast: Corey Allen (Rennie Foster), Frank Maxwell (Joe Dixon), John Archer (Burt Farwell), Richard Deacon (Wilmer Beaslee)
107	12	"The Case of the Larcenous Lady"	James Sheldon	Story by : Sy Salkowitz; Teleplay by : Seeleg Lester	N/A	December 17, 1960	171-118
When an important government job is offered to a man, his wife will go to any lengths to help her husband get the job including putting her own illegal activities on hold and resorting to blackmail which ends with murder. Cast: Ellen Drew (Julia Webberly), Louise Fletcher (Susan Connolly), Robert Brown (Frank Sykes), Patricia Huston (Mona Henderson), Edward Platt (Tom Stratton)
108	13	"The Case of the Envious Editor"	Laslo Benedek	Milton Krims	N/A	January 7, 1961	171-119
A new CEO has taken over control of a declining magazine with the intent to change it over the objections of the founder's son. CEO Fletcher, brazen and unlikeable, is murdered; and the attractive wife of the founder's son, Alyce, is charged. Cast: Philip Abbott (Edmond Aitken), James Coburn (Donald Fletcher), Barbara Lawrence (Lori Stoner), Jennifer Howard (Milly Nash), Vinton Hayworth (Wendell Harding), Sara Shane (Alyce Aitken)
109	14	"The Case of the Resolute Reformer"	Arthur Marks	Samuel Newman	N/A	January 14, 1961	171-120
A drunken playboy is in a hit-and-run accident and his attempt to help the victim by buying his property puts his father in a compromised situation. Cast: John Hoyt (William Harper Caine), James Westerfield (Roger Quigley), Phillip Terry (Lawrence Kent)
110	15	"The Case of the Fickle Fortune"	Laslo Benedek	Glenn P. Wolfe & Sol Stein	N/A	January 21, 1961	171-121
While conducting an inventory of a home whose owner died, a tax official comes across $153,000 in old currency hidden under a drawer. The money is stolen from his briefcase so he consults Perry. Cast: Vaughn Taylor (Ralph Duncan), Liam Sullivan (Lloyd Farrell), Virginia Christine (Helen Duncan). William Talman returns as Hamilton Burger in this episode after being absent from the prior 13 episodes. He is absent from the following two episodes and returns again in "The Case of the Angry Dead Man".
111	16	"The Case of the Waylaid Wolf"	Gene Fowler Jr.	Jonathan Latimer	1960 novel	February 4, 1961	171-122
A playboy has a steno work late, sabotages her car, and then offers her a ride along with dinner. He detours them to a Malibu beach house where he makes advances and she runs away and takes his car, but he is found dead later. Cast: Rebecca Welles (Edith Bristol), Andra Martin (Arlene Ferris), Barry Atwater (George Albert)
112	17	"The Case of the Wintry Wife"	Arthur Marks	Samuel Newman	N/A	February 18, 1961	171-123
A woman refuses to give her husband a divorce. His new invention gives him financial independence so his request for a divorce causes his wife to plan the destruction of the invention and his girlfriend. Cast: June Vincent (Laura Randall), Alan Hewitt (Bruce Sheridan), Marianne Stewart (Phyllis Hudson), Barney Phillips (Mr. Johnson)
113	18	"The Case of the Angry Dead Man"	Arthur Marks	Michael Morris	N/A	February 25, 1961	171-124
Perry defends a woman accused of murdering her husband who has shown up after previously faking his own death. Cast: Gloria Talbott (Eve Nesbitt), Edward Binns (Lloyd Castle), Les Tremayne (Willard Nesbitt), Gordon Jones (Deputy Gillis), James Millhollin (Ben Otis), Frank Ferguson (Prof. Laiken). William Talman returns as Hamilton Burger after being absent from the prior two episodes.
114	19	"The Case of the Blind Man's Bluff"	Arthur Marks	Story by : Adrian Gendot; Teleplay by : Adrian Gendotand & Samuel Newman	N/A	March 11, 1961	171-125
A family's jewels are all the family has left and their son needs to sell them, but the manager at the jewelry store refuses to allow the sale. The son is charged with the manager's murder after the jewels are stolen. Cast: John Conte (Karl Addison), Jack Ging (James Kincannon), Berry Kroeger (Edgar Whitehead), Geraldine Wall (Mrs. Cartwright)
115	20	"The Case of the Barefaced Witness"	Laslo Benedek	Robert C. Dennis	N/A	March 18, 1961	171-126
When a man released after being jailed for embezzling from his bank, a girl he knows returns to their hometown to have him clear her name. Cast: Paul Fix (Jonathan Hale), Malcolm Atterbury (Alfred Needham), Adam West (Don Southern)
116	21	"The Case of the Difficult Detour"	John Peyser	Story by : Sy Salkowitz; Teleplay by : Sy Salkowitz & Samuel Newman	N/A	March 25, 1961	171-127
A construction company is set to finish a road project on time when the owner learns he has trespassed, forcing a shutdown and bankruptcy. After learning he was swindled, the owner goes after the swindler who is found murdered. Cast: Jeff York (Pete Mallory), Jason Evers (Stuart Benton), Suzanne Lloyd (Sheila Benton), Mort Mills (Police Sgt. Ben Landro), Neil Hamilton (Jim Ames)
117	22	"The Case of the Cowardly Lion"	Arthur Marks	Jonathan Latimer	N/A	April 8, 1961	171-128
A man is accused of killing a dentist helping treat a lion. The man's girlfriend working at the zoo had been sponsored to enter the US from Germany by the dentist who has a mysterious background. Cast: Fred Beir (Tony Osgood), Phyllis Coates (Frieda Crawson), Leslie Bradley (Dr. Walther Braun), Betty Lou Gerson (Trudie Braun), Paul Birch (Security Officer Frank Crawford), Eddie Quillan (Bookkeeper Abner Keller), Bill Quinn (First Judge)
118	23	"The Case of the Torrid Tapestry"	John English	Bob Mitchell	N/A	April 22, 1961	171-129
A man is framed for burning an art collection in Brazil. After five years in prison, he returns to Los Angeles where he plots revenge. Cast: Conrad Nagel (Nathan Claver), Paula Raymond (Brenda Larkin), Robert H. Harris (Claude Demay), John Holland (Leonard Voss)
119	24	"The Case of the Violent Vest"	Lewis Allen	Robert C. Dennis	N/A	April 29, 1961	171-130
A man, who has a crush on the model he handles for an agency, asks his wife for a divorce when her gambling debts become too much. He is murdered and the model is charged with the crime. Cast: Myrna Fahey (Grace Halley Frye), Hayden Rorke (Walter Caffrey), Sonya Wilde (Joy Lebaron), Erik Rhodes (Herman Albright), Dorothy Green (Ida Albright), Barbara Pepper (Mrs. Diamond)
120	25	"The Case of the Misguided Missile"	John Peyser	Sol Stein & Glenn P. Wolfe	N/A	May 6, 1961	171-132
An Air Force Major, who supervises missile development, is looking to leave the Air Force. When an investigator is found murdered after looking into launch failures, the Major is charged. Cast: Bruce Bennett (Dan Morgan), Simon Oakland (Captain Caldwell), Robert Rockwell (Major Jerry Reynolds), Richard Arlen (Dr. Harrison), William Schallert (Dr. Bradbury)
121	26	"The Case of the Duplicate Daughter"	Arthur Marks	Samuel Newman	1960 novel	May 20, 1961	171-131
A man hires Perry to investigate a female private detective he believes is blackmailing his wife. The woman is later found murdered and the man is charged as she was killed in his shop. Cast: Don Dubbins (Hartley Elliott), Walter Kinsella (Carter Gilman), Willis Bouchey (Judge)
122	27	"The Case of the Grumbling Grandfather"	Bernard L. Kowalski	Jackson Gillis	N/A	May 27, 1961	171-133
A grandfather tries to warn his grandson to stay away from a woman who was the secretary to the boy's dead uncle. When the secretary's husband is found dead, the grandson is charged. Cast: Patricia Barry (Dorine Hopkins), Otto Kruger (J.J. Gideon), Karl Held (David Gideon), Frances Rafferty (Sue Franks), Gavin MacLeod (Lawrence Cumminger), Fifi D'Orsay (Woman Witness), Dub Taylor (Stroller)
123	28	"The Case of the Guilty Clients"	Lewis Allen	Jonathan Latimer	N/A	June 10, 1961	171-134
A man's aircraft company is betting on the success of a new plane, but after it crashes in a test flight, attention becomes focused on the test pilot who is found murdered. Cast: Lisa Gaye (Lola Bronson), Charles Bateman (Jeff Bronson), Guy Mitchell (Bill Ryder), Faith Domergue (Conception O'Higgins), Ben Wright (Clarence Keller)

=== Season 5 (1961–62) ===
No. overall	No. in season	Title	Directed by	Written by	Based on	Original release date	Prod. code
124	1	"The Case of the Jealous Journalist"	John English	Samuel Newman	N/A	September 2, 1961	171-135
After the death of a newspaper publisher, the failing company is split between two families. One of the families is led by a man who is engaged to marry a step-niece who owns the tiebreaker shares. She is later found murdered. Cast: Irene Hervey (Grace Davies), Linden Chiles (Joseph Davies), Denver Pyle (Tilden Stuart), Frieda Inescort (Hope Quentin)
125	2	"The Case of the Impatient Partner"	Arthur Marks	Adrian Gendot	N/A	September 16, 1961	171-136
A man returns after a business trip to find one of his plants burned. When his partner is found murdered, he is charged with the crime. Cast: Ben Cooper (Frank Wells), Leslie Parrish (Vivian Ames), Wesley Lau (Amory Fallon)
126	3	"The Case of the Missing Melody"	Bernard L. Kowalski	Jonathan Latimer	N/A	September 30, 1961	171-139
Polly Courtland leaves Eddy King at the altar but refuses to say why. He asks Perry, a friend of her family, to find out why, but Perry has little luck. When Eddy learns that someone blackmailing Polly is murdered, he tries to help her. Cast: Constance Towers (Jonny Baker), James Drury (Eddy King), Bobby Troup (Bongo White), Jo Morrow (Polly Courtland), Andrea King (Enid Markham), Walter Burke (Jack Grabba), Crahan Denton (Templeton Courtland), music composed by Barney Kessel
127	4	"The Case of the Malicious Mariner"	Christian Nyby	Robert Leslie Bellem	N/A	October 7, 1961	171-142
A man signs onto a freighter that nearly sinks until he takes command when the captain is hurt. The captain is furious with him for dumping the cargo. The captain is later found murdered. Cast: Edward Binns (Charles Griffin), Roy Roberts (Arthur Janeel), Lee Farr (Jerry Griffin), Karl Held (David Gideon), Casey Adams (Frank Logan), Robert Armstrong (Captain Bancroft), Robert Carson (Capt. Lansing)
128	5	"The Case of the Crying Comedian"	Arthur Marks	Robert C. Dennis	N/A	October 14, 1961	171-137
A comedian has 'made it big'. He wants to protect his girlfriend who had married a man who confined her to a sanitarium. After threatening to kill the man, the husband is found murdered and the comedian is charged. Cast: Tommy Noonan (Charlie Hatch), Jackie Coogan (Elwood P. 'Gunner' Grimes), Gloria Talbott (Anne Gilrain), Sue Ane Langdon (Rowena Leach), Liam Sullivan (Thomas H. Gilrain)
129	6	"The Case of the Meddling Medium"	Arthur Marks	Samuel Newman	N/A	October 21, 1961	171-140
A cousin moves into the family home when his ability to communicate with the dead son of the matriarch gets her interest. When he is murdered, Perry must contend with whether his client has ESP. Cast: Virginia Field (Sylvia Walker), Kent Smith (Dr. Arthur Younger), Mary La Roche (Helen Garden), Sonya Wilde (Bonnie Craig), James Forrest (Phillip Paisley), Dr. Andrija Puharich (Himself)
130	7	"The Case of the Pathetic Patient"	Bernard L. Kowalski	Maurice Zimm	N/A	October 28, 1961	171-141
A doctor is accused of malpractice. His wife's ex-boyfriend tells him to settle, but ends up murdered. Cast: Skip Homeier (Dr. Wayne Edley), Frank Cady (Joe Widlock/Hiram Widlock), Virginia Gregg (Mrs. Osborn), Mort Mills (Police Sgt. Ben Landro), Edward Kemmer (Leslie Hall), Percy Helton (Asa Cooperman), Wayne Heffley (Grif Roland)
131	8	"The Case of the Traveling Treasure"	Arthur Marks	Robb White	N/A	November 4, 1961	171-143
A man has a contract to take a party to kelp beds near Mexico each weekend. The party lead canceled, but suddenly decides to go. Perry is called when the party lead is found murdered. Cast: Jeff York (Capt. Scot Cahill), Lisa Gaye (Rita Magovern), Arch Johnson (Karl Magovern), Vaughn Taylor (Prof. Sneider)
132	9	"The Case of the Posthumous Painter"	Bernard L. Kowalski	Richard Grey	N/A	November 11, 1961	171-144
An artist decides to fake his suicide to increase the value of his paintings. His wife leaves the country so he is able to finish his work. She returns only to be charged with his murder. Cast: Stuart Erwin (Austin Durrant), George Macready (Dr. Vincent Kenyon), Lori March (Edna Culross), Britt Lomond (Jack Culross), James Griffith (Walter Hutchings)
133	10	"The Case of the Injured Innocent"	Bernard L. Kowalski	Paul Franklin	N/A	November 18, 1961	
A man is putting money behind the development of a rotary engine. The test driver deliberately crashes the car and later ends up dead. Cast: John Conte (Kirby Evans), Frank Maxwell (Mooney), Audrey Dalton (Kate Eastman), Alejandro Rey (Vincent Danielli), Jess Barker (Walter Eastman), Linda Lawson (Erin Mooney), Raymond Bailey (Dr. Bell)
134	11	"The Case of the Left-Handed Liar"	Jerry Hopper	Jonathan Latimer	N/A	November 25, 1961	
An ex-jock works at Health House and is engaged to a woman whose guardian owns it. The guardian is murdered and the ex-jock is blamed. Cast: Ed Nelson (Ward Nichols), Leslie Parrish (Veronica Temple), Les Tremayne (Bernard Daniels), Dabbs Greer (Buzz Farrell)
135	12	"The Case of the Brazen Bequest"	Arthur Marks	Robert Leslie Bellem	N/A	December 2, 1961	171-148
A doctor is preparing to accept a large gift when a woman from his past makes a drunken appearance. He learns a donor's aide is behind her appearance and when the aide is found dead, the doctor is charged with the crime. Cast: Alan Hewitt (Dr. Marcus Tate), Karl Weber (Charles Cromwell), Mort Mills (Police Sgt. Ben Landro), Strother Martin (Pete Gibson), Will Wright (James Vardon)
136	13	"The Case of the Renegade Refugee"	Bernard L. Kowalski	Samuel Newman	N/A	December 9, 1961	171-147
A reporter reveals he is looking for an escaped Nazi among the executives of an aerospace company. The reporter is later killed. Cast: Dick Foran (Harlan Merrill), Paul Lambert (Lawrence Vander), John Sutton (Clifton Barlow), Ronald Long (Arthur Hennings), Jennifer Howard (Winifred Dunbrack), Denver Pyle (Emery Fillmore)
137	14	"The Case of the Unwelcome Bride"	Gilbert L. Kay	Helen Nielsen	N/A	December 16, 1961	171-138
A man is the son of a successful investment manager who is disappointed his son has led a wasted life. When his son is found murdered with his wife standing over the body holding a knife, she is charged with murder. Cast: Diana Millay (Sue Ellen Frazer), De Forest Kelley (Peter Thorpe), Alan Hale (Lon Snyder)
138	15	"The Case of the Roving River"	Jerry Hopper	Samuel Newman	N/A	December 30, 1961	171-149
A woman is involved in a land dispute that her stepfather can help with, but he needs $10,000. When the package with the money she delivers explodes, she is charged. Cast: Sarah Marshall (Judy Bryant), Bruce Bennett (Matt Lambert), Paul Fix (Prosecutor), Philip Ober (Harvey Farrell), June Vincent (Chloris Bryant), J. Pat O'Malley (Seth Tyson), Harry Carey Jr. (District Ranger Frank Deane), Robert Lowery (Amos Bryant)
139	16	"The Case of the Shapely Shadow"	Christian Nyby	Jackson Gillis	1960 novel	January 6, 1962	171-150
A secretary becomes concerned when she learns her boss is being blackmailed. Perry advises her to follow through with her instructions, but it results in her being charged with murder. Cast: Robert Rockwell (Cole B. Troy), Dorothy Green (Carlotta Theilman), Elaine Devry (Janice Wainwright), Barbara Lawrence (Agnes Theilman), George N. Neise (Morley L. Thielman)
140	17	"The Case of the Captain's Coins"	Arthur Marks	Adrian Gendot	N/A	January 13, 1962	
A man is charged with murder after already being accused of fraud. Cast: Jeremy Slate (Philip Andrews), Jay Novello (Nickolas Trevelian), Herbert Rudley (Ben Farraday), Parley Baer (Edward Farraday), Henry Beckman (Sid Garth), Eddie Quillan (Photographer)
141	18	"The Case of the Tarnished Trademark"	Jerry Hopper	Oliver Crawford & Maurice Zimm	N/A	January 20, 1962	171-152
A man who has built a furniture business around old-world craftsmanship is fulfilling his dream to sell the shop and using the proceeds to build a children's hospital. However, the buyer is a con man who is murdered. Cast: Karl Swenson (Axel Norstaad), Osa Massen (Lisa Pedersen), Marie Windsor (Edith 'Edie' Morrow), Malcolm Atterbury (J. Maigret), Dennis Patrick (Martin Somers), Morgan Woodward (Carl Pedersen), Edward Norris (Sam Hadley)
142	19	"The Case of the Glamorous Ghost"	Arthur Marks	Samuel Newman	1955 novel	February 3, 1962	171-153
A woman is found in a park and says she has amnesia, but her story makes no sense. She supposedly eloped with a man who is found dead in the same park. Cast: Mary Murphy (Eleanor Corbin), Jeanne Cooper (Ethel Belan), Douglas Dick (Walter Richey), Coleen Gray (Olga Corbin), Vinton Hayworth (Homer Corbin)
143	20	"The Case of the Poison Pen-Pal"	Arthur Marks	Maurice Zimm	N/A	February 10, 1962	171-154
A man's aunt is murdered after she investigates a company leak that may involve her nephew's old secretary. The secretary travels to San Francisco to see the aunt and ends up charged with her murder due to pen-pal letters. Cast: Everett Sloane (District Attorney), Patricia Breslin (Karen Ross), Joan Tompkins (Florence Holman), Kathryn Givney (Wilma Gregson),
144	21	"The Case of the Mystified Miner"	Francis D. Lyon	Jackson Gillis	1962 novel (Note: Title changed from Gardner's original, The Case of the Spurious Spinster)	February 24, 1962	171-155
A secretary tries to help her boss' employer who comes to town to check the books, but digs herself deeper into trouble. She is charged with murder when another company employee is found dead. Cast: Kathie Brown (Susan Fisher), Josephine Hutchinson (Amelia Corning), Carlos Rivas (Alfredo Gomez), Sheila Bromley (Elizabeth Dow),
145	22	"The Case of the Crippled Cougar"	Jesse Hibbs	Bob Mitchell	N/A	March 3, 1962	171-156
A man was crippled in an oil well accident. He and his partner set a devious trap for the person he blames for the accident, but when his partner is murdered, he is charged with the crime. Cast: Bill Williams (Mike Preston), John Howard (Hugh Jamison), Mort Mills (Police Sgt. Ben Landro), Noah Keen (Harlow Phipps), John Bryant (Arnold Keith)
146	23	"The Case of the Absent Artist"	Arthur Marks	Robert C. Dennis	N/A	March 17, 1962	171-157
A man is given a chance to buy the cartoon strip he works on, however, when he learns his girlfriend is going to leave with the seller, he is enraged and charged when the seller is murdered. Cast: ZaSu Pitts (Daphne Whilom), Mark Roberts (Otto Gervaert/Gabe Philips), Richard Erdman (Charles Montrose), Victor Buono (Alexander Glovatski), Wynne Pearce (Pete Manders), Lane Bradford (Det. Arnold Buck), Bill Zuckert (Judge), Barney Phillips (Mr. Newburgh), Arlene Sax (Fiona Cregan)
147	24	"The Case of the Melancholy Marksman"	Jerry Hopper	Robb White	N/A	March 24, 1962	171-158
A man appears to be losing his grip on reality. His first wife committed suicide and his second wife is destroying his life, but he can't divorce her due to a prenup. When she is murdered, he is charged. Cast: Paul Richards (Ted Chase), Jeff Donnell (Sylvia Dykes), Mari Blanchard (Irene Chase), William Schallert (Len Dykes), Ann Rutherford (Ellen Chase), Peter Baldwin (Tony Benson), Jesse White (Cecil)
148	25	"The Case of the Angry Astronaut"	Francis D. Lyon	Samuel Newman	N/A	April 7, 1962	171-159
A man is having problems doing his job as a test astronaut. The problems become worse when a new man taking over is the general who fired him from another program. Cast: James Coburn (General Addison Brand), Robert Bray (Mitch Heller), Steve Brodie (Eddie Lewis), Paula Raymond (Terry Faye), John Marley (Matthew Owen)
149	26	"The Case of the Borrowed Baby"	Arthur Marks	Jonathan Latimer	N/A	April 14, 1962	171-160
Perry and Della find a baby in his office. Perry finds another man is also trying to sell information about the baby. When he is found dead, the mother looks to be guilty. Cast: Hugh Marlowe (Jarvis Baker), Maria Palmer (Florence Wood), Corey Allen (Lester Menke), Kaye Elhardt (Ginny Talbot)
150	27	"The Case of the Counterfeit Crank"	Jerry Hopper	Robert Leslie Bellem	N/A	April 28, 1962	171-161
A man's business is suffering from someone embezzling. His nephew decides to have him declared incompetent. The nephew is later found murdered. Cast: Otto Kruger (August Dalgran), Jeanette Nolan (Martha Blair), Don Dubbins (Kenneth Dalgran), Connie Hines (Sandra Dalgran), John Larkin (Jay Fenton), Burt Reynolds (Chuck Blair), John Hubbard (Joseph Tayback)
151	28	"The Case of the Ancient Romeo"	Arthur Marks	True Boardman	N/A	May 5, 1962	171-162
An actress takes over the part of Juliet in a theater company's show. One of the members is upset when his girlfriend loses the part. He is charged when the theater company owner is killed. Cast: Jeff Morrow (Franz Lachman), Rex Reason (Steve Brock), Harry von Zell (Phil Scharf), Patricia Huston (Claire Adams), Antoinette Bower (Ellen Carson), K. T. Stevens (Margit Bruner), Robert Cornthwaite (Carl Bruner)
152	29	"The Case of the Promoter's Pillbox"	Jesse Hibbs	Peter Martin	N/A	May 19, 1962	171-163
A man wants to be a screenwriter instead of a pharmacist. When his script is stolen by a producer, he steals his script back. When he tries to put it back, he stumbles upon the producer's dead body. Cast: Geraldine Brooks (Miriam Waters), Dianne Foster (Nelly Lawton), Ben Cooper (Davis Crane), Linden Chiles (Herbert Simms), John Lasell (Charlie Cory), Edmon Ryan (Jerome Stokes), Geraldine Wall (Mrs. Simms)
153	30	"The Case of the Lonely Eloper"	Arthur Marks	Robert C. Dennis	N/A	May 26, 1962	174-164
A woman is nearly 21, but her guardian's wife infantilizes her so she has a youngster's personality. She plans to elope after her birthday, but she's charged when her aunt is murdered and diamonds are stolen. Cast: John Dall (Julian Kirk), Jana Taylor (Merle Telford), Joan Staley (Gina Gilbert), Billy Halop (Corbett)

=== Season 6 (1962–63) ===
No. overall	No. in season	Title	Directed by	Written by	Based on	Original release date	Prod. code
154	1	"The Case of the Bogus Books"	Arthur Marks	Jonathan Latimer	N/A	September 27, 1962	2229-168
A woman works at a relative's bookstore. When a book is found missing, she is fired. When the owner is murdered, she is charged with the crime. Cast: Phyllis Love (Ellen Carter), Adam West (Pete Norland), Woodrow Parfrey (Herbert Pickson)
155	2	"The Case of the Capricious Corpse"	Arthur Marks	Jonathan Latimer	N/A	October 4, 1962	2228-165
A woman and her boyfriend are concerned what will happen to a home for disabled children when Carleton Gage dies. When they find one of the heirs dead, the boyfriend concocts an idea that backfires when his girlfriend is charged with murder. Cast: Lori March (Olive Omstead), Jan Shepard (Joane Proctor)
156	3	"The Case of the Playboy Pugilist"	Francis D. Lyon	Helen Nielsen	N/A	October 11, 1962	2228-169
A man is hired as trainer for a fighter and ends up is in the middle of a blackmail scheme and charged with murder. Cast: Gary Lockwood (Davey Carroll), Dianne Foster (Lori Richards), Robert Armstrong (Jimmy West), Dolores Michaels (Jo Sands), Mark Roberts (Tod Richards), Mort Mills (Police Sgt. Ben Landro)
157	4	"The Case of the Double-Entry Mind"	Allen H. Miner	Jackson Gillis	N/A	October 18, 1962	2228-170
Perry's friend is in a strained marriage so she asks him for his help. When the woman who took her job is murdered, she is charged as her husband tries to preserve the money he embezzled from the company where they worked. Cast: Stuart Erwin (Clem P. 'Sandy' Sandover), Virginia Christine (Beth Sandover), Kathleen Hughes (Lita Krail)
158	5	"The Case of the Hateful Hero"	Jesse Hibbs	Samuel Newman	N/A	October 25, 1962	2228-166
A lieutenant has a cousin who is moving from the beat to a patrol car partnered with the lieutenant's old friend. The friend is killed when they respond to a burglary and when the security guard is killed later, the cousin is charged. Cast: Dick Davalos (James Anderson), Leonard Stone (Jerel Leland), Jeanette Nolan (Erna Norden), Mabel Albertson (Carrie Wilson), Sue England (Fleta York), William Boyett (Otto Norden)
159	6	"The Case of the Dodging Domino"	Arthur Marks	Charles Lang	N/A	November 1, 1962	2228-171
A man married an actress who has an offer to return to work that involves a great song that she recognizes which has been plagiarized multiple times. Cast: Ellen Burstyn (Mona Winthrope White), Lloyd Corrigan (Rudy Mahlsted), Robert H. Harris (Jerry Janda), David Hedison (Damian White), Eddie Firestone (Leonard Buckman), James Forrest (Phil Schuyler), Maureen Arthur (Vera Jordan)
160	7	"The Case of the Unsuitable Uncle"	Francis D. Lyon	Robert C. Dennis	N/A	November 8, 1962	2228-167
A merchant seaman arrives in the U.S. with his mate to visit the mate's brother and his family. When the mate is murdered, the merchant seaman is charged. Cast: Sean McClory (Harry Fothergill), Liam Sullivan (Richard W. 'Dickie' Durham), Howard Smith (Frank Warden), Barbara Parkins (Paula Durham), Anna Lee (Crystal Durham), Harvey Korman (George Coleman - Bartender)
161	8	"The Case of the Stand-In Sister"	Allen H. Miner	Robert Leslie Bellem	N/A	November 15, 1962	2228-173
A man is caught in a trap when his brother wants the money he put in a trust fund for his daughter. The manager of the trust fund tries to blackmail the man about it and is murdered. Cast: R. G. Armstrong (John Gregory), Peter Whitney (Stefan 'Big Steve' Jahnchek), Peter Mamakos (Nick Paolo), Susan Seaforth (Helen Gregory), Steven Geray (Franz Moray), Meg Wyllie (Margaret Stone)
162	9	"The Case of the Weary Watchdog"	Jesse Hibbs	Samuel Newman	N/A	November 29, 1962	2228-172
Della is on the hook to Perry for $25,000 and also may go to prison for helping a friend charged with murder. Perry must not only prove his client innocent, but his trusted secretary as well. Cast: Mala Powers (Janet Brent), Doris Dowling (Zaneta Holmes), John Dall (Edward Franklin), Keye Luke (C. C. Chang), Philip Ahn (James Wong), Robert Carson (Commodore Galen Holmes), James Hong (Dean Chang)
163	10	"The Case of the Lurid Letter"	Arthur Marks	Jonathan Latimer	N/A	December 6, 1962	2228-174
On vacation, Perry decides to help a woman who had been kind to him. She is a widowed high-school teacher who is accused of inappropriate behavior with some of her senior students. Cast: Mona Freeman (Jane Wardman), Edgar Buchanan (Judge Edward Daley), Robert Rockwell (Everett Rixby), Ann Doran (Cornelia Slater), Chris Alcaide (Gus Wiler)
164	11	"The Case of the Fickle Filly"	Allen H. Miner	Robert and Esther Mitchell	N/A	December 13, 1962	2228-175
A woman is upset her uncle sold her prize horse after her dad died. Given a chance to get her horse back, she is interrupted by the man who bought the horse. The man is later found dead. Cast: Jim Davis (George Tabor), Mort Mills (Police Sgt. Ben Landro), Joan Freeman (Jennifer Wakeley), Jennifer Howard (Madelon Haines Shelby), Strother Martin (Joe Mead)
165	12	"The Case of the Polka-Dot Pony"	Jesse Hibbs	Robert C. Dennis	N/A	December 20, 1962	2228-176
A woman is contacted by a man who believes he can put her in contact with the mother who abandoned her. When the man is murdered, she is charged. Cast: Jesse White (Bert Renshaw), Virginia Field (Angela Renshaw Fernaldi), Ben Cooper (James Grove), Melinda Plowman (Maureen Thomas), Byron Foulger (Leverett Thomas/Pop)
166	13	"The Case of the Shoplifter's Shoe"	Arthur Marks	Jackson Gillis	1938 novel	January 3, 1963	2228-177
A man's aunt is shoplifting and diamonds are missing from her uncle's business. When her aunt is charged with murdering a diamond agent, Perry is needed. Cast: Margaret O'Brien (Virginia Trent), Lurene Tuttle (Sarah Breel), Leonard Nimoy (Pete Chennery),
167	14	"The Case of the Bluffing Blast"	Allen H. Miner	Samuel Newman	N/A	January 10, 1963	2228-178
A woman is looking for her father only to find he has been dead for several years. His death occurred with suspicions that he was murdered. Cast: Bill Williams (Floyd Grant), Frank Overton (Deputy D.A. Nelson Taylor), Peter Breck (Clay Elliot), Antoinette Bower (Linda Blake), Frank Ferguson (Sheriff Orville Ramsey), Ralph Manza (Dr. Lieberson), Bill Zuckert (Judge)
168	15	"The Case of the Prankish Professor"	Jesse Hibbs	Robert C. Dennis	N/A	January 17, 1963	2228-179
A professor's estranged wife is accused of murdering her husband shortly after he stages a fake shooting in one of his classes. Cast: Constance Towers (Esther Metcalfe), Patricia Breslin (Laura Hewes), Barry Atwater (Professor Ronald Hewes), Kent Smith (Dr. Curtis Metcalfe), Don Dubbins (Ned Bertell), Joyce Van Patten (Sally Sheldon), Barbara Pepper (Mrs. Williamson), John Bryant (Mike Estridge)
169	16	"The Case of Constant Doyle"	Allen H. Miner	Jackson Gillis	N/A	January 31, 1963	171-163
After the death of her husband and partner, a woman takes on a case involving a young man who knew her husband. She asks for Perry's help. Cast: Bette Davis (Constant Doyle), Michael Parks (Cal Leonard), Peggy Ann Garner (Letty Arthur), Frances Reid (Miss Liza Givney), Neil Hamilton (Fred McCormick)
170	17	"The Case of the Libelous Locket"	Arthur Marks	Jonathan Latimer	N/A	February 7, 1963	2228-180
A woman turns to her law professor when she thinks she killed a man. She is charged with murder so the professor defends her. Cast: Michael Rennie (Professor Edward Lindley), Ruta Lee (Vivian Cosgrave), Harry von Zell (Sidney Hawes), Carlos Romero (Paul Perez)
171	18	"The Case of the Two-Faced Turnabout"	Arthur Marks	Samuel Newman	N/A	February 14, 1963	2228-182
A political refugee from the Balkans hopes to obtain papers from a leader who supposedly committed suicide. When the seller is killed, the refugee is charged. Cast: Hugh O'Brian (Bruce Jason), Lisa Gaye (Alyssa Laban), Trevor Bardette (Garrett Richards), Abraham Sofaer (Elihu Laban), Robert F. Simon (Philip Hillman), Werner Klemperer (Ulric Zenas)
172	19	"The Case of the Surplus Suitor"	Jesse Hibbs	Robert C. Dennis	N/A	February 28, 1963	2228-183
A woman is deciding between two beaus who are also after a franchise from her uncle. Her problems grow when her uncle is first blackmailed and then murdered and she is charged with the crime. Cast: Walter Pidgeon (Sherman Hatfield), Joyce Bulifant (Hollis Wilburn), Carl Benton Reid (John Wilburn), Linden Chiles (Vernon Elliott), Andrea King (Jean Crewe), Hayden Rorke (Gage McKinney), music by Nathan Van Cleave
173	20	"The Case of the Golden Oranges"	Arthur Marks	Jonathan Latimer	N/A	March 7, 1963	2228-184
A woman agrees to sell her grandfather's orange orchard to a developer for mall parking. When the developer is shot, she is charged. Cast: Natalie Trundy (Sandra Keller), Arch Johnson (Gerald Thornton), Lee Van Cleef (Edward Doyle)
174	21	"The Case of the Lawful Lazarus"	Jesse Hibbs	True Boardman	N/A	March 14, 1963	2228-185
A man has returned home after 10 years as his wife is dying and he wants to ensure his children have a good home with a woman instead of the family patriarch. When the patriarch is shot, the man is charged. Cast: David McLean (Trevor Harris), Maria Palmer (Nora Kasner), Irene Hervey (Jill Garson), Philip Bourneuf (Edgar Thorne)
175	22	"The Case of the Velvet Claws"	Harmon Jones	Jackson Gillis	1933 novel	March 21, 1963	2228-186
A woman is caught in a photo leaving an illegal gambling club with a politician. Fearing she will be blackmailed, she asks Perry for help. Cast: Patricia Barry (Eva Belter), Wynn Pearce (Carl Griffin), Virginia Gregg (Mrs. Vickers), Anna-Lisa (Norma Vickers), Richard Webb (George C Belter),
176	23	"The Case of the Lover's Leap"	Arthur Marks	Robb White	N/A	April 4, 1963	2228-187
A man is handling the finances in a real estate deal. He supposedly commits suicide, but the man he has been working with on the deal is charged with his murder. Cast: Julie Adams (Valerie Comstock), John Conte (Roy Comstock), Carleton Carpenter (Peter Brent), Richard Jaeckel (Willie), Marvin Miller (F. J. Weatherby)
177	24	"The Case of the Elusive Element"	Harmon Jones	Samuel Newman	N/A	April 11, 1963	2228-188
In an attempt to save himself, a con-artist tries to frame a man for his murder, but the murder becomes real. Cast: Gerald Mohr (Austin Lloyd), Gloria Talbott (Bonnie Lloyd), Douglas Henderson (Dwight Garrett), Douglas Dick (Ned Chase)
178	25	"The Case of the Greek Goddess"	Jesse Hibbs	Story by : Robert Presnell, Sr. Teleplay by : Arthur Orloff & Robert Presnell, Sr. & Maurice Zimm	N/A	April 18, 1963	2228-189
A sculptor returns from Greece with a beautiful model and her supposed mother. He becomes irritated when the mother interferes with his attempts to court the (much younger) model. When the mother is killed, he is charged. Cast: John Larkin (John Kenyon), John Anderson (Dan O'Malley), George Kennedy (George Spengler), Faith Domergue (Cleo Grammas)
179	26	"The Case of the Skeleton's Closet"	Arthur Marks	Samuel Newman	N/A	May 2, 1963	2228-190
A woman is deeply worried that ex-husband will publish a trashy novel because of its effect on their daughters. When she visits him, she is heard threatening to kill him. Cast: Peggy McCay (Margaret Layton), Frank Aletter (Harry Collings), Michael Pate (Richard Harris), Dabbs Greer (Jack Tabor)
180	27	"The Case of the Potted Planter"	Jesse Hibbs	Robert C. Dennis	N/A	May 9, 1963	2228-191
A man bought a small-town radio station on a recommendation from his friend, who is married to the owner. Her husband believes the rumors about her infidelity, so when he is murdered, the man is charged. Cast: Constance Ford (Frances), Diane Brewster (Andrea Walden), Paul Fix (District Attorney Hale), Mark Goddard (Roy Mooney), Robert Bray (Martin Walden), Joe Maross (Nelson Tarr), Harry Lauter (Chris Hearn)
181	28	"The Case of the Witless Witness"	Arthur Marks	Story by : Marshall Houts & Samuel Newman; Teleplay by : Samuel Newman	N/A	May 16, 1963	2228-192
A judge has been nominated to run for Lt. Governor, however, he is soon forced to turn it down when he's accused of fraud and murdering the witness against him. Cast: Robert Middleton (Judge Daniel Redmond), David White (Victor Kendall), Jackie Coogan (Gus Sawyer), Steve Brodie (Quinn Torrey), Florida Friebus (Marian Lamont), Vaughn Taylor (Martin Weston)

=== Season 7 (1963–64) ===
No. overall	No. in season	Title	Directed by	Written by	Based on	Original release date	Prod. code
182	1	"The Case of the Nebulous Nephew"	Arthur Marks	Jonathan Latimer	N/A	September 26, 1963	2228-1203
A man arrives at the home of two sisters saying he knew a nephew who was declared illegitimate as a youth. Due to his recall of facts, they think he is really their nephew. Cast: Beulah Bondi (Sophia Stone), Mark Roberts (Wayne Jameson), Hugh Marlowe (Ernest Stone), Ivan Dixon (Caleb Stone), Meg Wylie (Ninevah Stone), Irene Tedrow (Sister Theresa)
183	2	"The Case of the Shifty Shoe-Box"	Arthur Marks	Jackson Gillis	N/A	October 3, 1963	1205
A woman works at a trucking company and looks after a young boy and her brother. A robbery attempt and murder have the woman charged with the murder. Cast: Constance Ford (Sylvia Thompson), Benny Baker (John Flickinger), Billy Mumy (Miles Jefferson), Denver Pyle (Frank Honer), Joseph Sirola (Bill Sheridan), Ray Teal (Joe Downing), Diane Ladd (Miss Frances)
184	3	"The Case of the Drowsy Mosquito"	Jesse Hibbs	Jonathan Latimer	1943 novel	October 10, 1963	1206
Perry learns that con artists have been selling phony gold mines so to find out who's responsible, Paul disguises himself as a prospector. Cast: Arthur Hunnicutt (Sandy Bowen), Russell Collins (Banning Grant), Kathleen Crowley (Lillian Bradisson), Robert J. Wilke (Deputy Sheriff Connors), Strother Martin (Gerald Sommers), Ann Doran (Nell Wyatt)
185	4	"The Case of the Deadly Verdict"	Jesse Hibbs	Jonathan Latimer	N/A	October 17, 1963	1208
Perry loses a case when his client is convicted of murdering her aunt and is subsequently sentenced to death. After the verdict, Perry continues to investigate to try to find the real killer. Cast: Julie Adams (Janice Barton), Joan Tompkins (Emily Green), Erin O'Brien-Moore (Letitia Simmons), Jan Shepard (Paulette Niven), Stephen Franken (Christopher Barton), Lee Bergere (Dr. Charles Nivens) In 1997, TV Guide ranked this episode number 51 on its list of the 100 Greatest Episodes.
186	5	"The Case of the Decadent Dean"	Earl Bellamy	Joseph P. Lamont & Samuel Newman	N/A	October 24, 1963	1207
A man runs a prep school, and is running into a string of problems at the school that endanger its future. Eventually, he finds that his so-called friend is the cause and is accused of killing him, twice. Cast: Milton Selzer (Dr. Aaron Stuart), Lloyd Corrigan (Harvey Forrest), H. M. Wynant (Tobin Wade)
187	6	"The Case of the Reluctant Model"	Jesse Hibbs	Jonathan Latimer	1962 novel	October 31, 1963	2228-1201
An aspiring artist and model becomes embroiled in a lawsuit about whether a painting is a fake. When a man is found dead in her shower, she is charged. Cast: John Larkin (Otto Olney), Robert Brown (Goring Gilbert), Joanna Moore (Grace Olney), Margaret Hayes (Leslie Rankin), John Dall (Colin Durant)
188	7	"The Case of the Bigamous Spouse"	Arthur Marks	Jackson Gillis	1961 novel	November 14, 1963	1210
An encyclopedia saleswoman has moved in with her friend and her new husband. She spots a picture in a customer's home and realizes her friend's husband is a bigamist. When he is found dead, she is the prime suspect. Cast: Pippa Scott (Gwynn Elston), Patrick McVey (George Belding Baxter), Karl Swenson (Corley Ketchum), Michael Conrad (Felton Grimes), Allan J. Melvin (Carl Jasper)
189	8	"The Case of the Floating Stones"	Don Weis	Robert C. Dennis	N/A	November 21, 1963	1202
A woman is in Hong Kong after her grandfather's death. He had left her a small fortune in diamonds, but they are missing. She trails two men by ship to San Francisco where she is caught leaving the office of one them who is stabbed. Cast: Victor Maddern (Gilbert Tyrell), Irene Tsu (Juli Eng), Joyce Jameson (Lorraine Iverson), James Hong (Louis Kew)
190	9	"The Case of the Festive Felon"	Earl Bellamy	Samuel Newman	N/A	November 28, 1963	1209
Before a woman dies, she leaves a certified check to her nurse which the family and their lawyer try to hide and contest. Perry is hired to obtain the check and then defend her daughter who is charged with killing the lawyer. Cast: Jon Hall (Max Randall), Sherry Jackson (Madeline Randall), Kathie Browne (Carla Eden), John Howard (Justin Grover)
191	10	"The Case of the Devious Delinquent"	Irving J. Moore	Robb White	N/A	December 5, 1963	1211
A young man has returned to live with his grandfather after his parents were killed. His grandfather has high hopes for his grandson, but his grandson seems to have fallen in with a hoodlum who blackmails him. Cast: David Winters (Charles 'Chick' Montana), Virginia Christine (Edith Summers), Otto Kruger (Timothy Balfour Sr.), Barton MacLane (Harold Minter), Frances Rafferty (Miss Adler),
192	11	"The Case of the Bouncing Boomerang"	Jesse Hibbs	Arthur Orloff	N/A	December 12, 1963	1212
A man and his wife have a rural ranch with a big mortgage. The wife wants to leave, but no one wants to pay enough until a rich Texan says it is what he wants. When she is killed, her husband is charged. Cast: Rod Cameron (Grover Johnson), Diana Millay (Eula Johnson), Paul Picerni (Walter Jeffries), Alan Hale (Nelson Barclift)
193	12	"The Case of the Badgered Brother"	Earl Bellamy	Bob and Esther Mitchell	N/A	December 19, 1963	1204
A man has a chance to inherit half of his father's chain of stores with his brother. His chance depends on an exclusive dress brand, but his brother spoils his plans. Cast: Robert Harland (Todd Baylor), Nancy Kovack (Carla Rinaldi), Patricia Blair (Nicolai Wright), Peter Walker (Martin Baylor), L. Q. Jones (Edward Lewis)
194	13	"The Case of the Wednesday Woman"	Irving J. Moore	Samuel Newman	N/A	January 2, 1964	1215
After a man is released from prison, he is charged with killing a detective who is looking for a missing diamond. Cast: Phillip Pine (Philip Stewart), Marie Windsor (Mrs. Helen Reed), John Hoyt (Thomas Webber), Michael Pate (Jack Mallory), Ralph Manza (Amos Elwell)
195	14	"The Case of the Accosted Accountant"	Arthur Marks	Albert A. Vail & Samuel Newman	N/A	January 9, 1964	1213
A vice president of a company is in a fight with his father-in-law over the future of the business. He thinks his father-in-law is embezzling. When his father-in-law is murdered, he is seen throwing away the weapon. Cast: Richard Anderson (Edward Lewis), Murray Matheson (B. K. Doran), Gail Kobe (Gertrude Lewis), Lynn Bari (Sylvia Cord), Robert Armstrong (Phil Jenks)
196	15	"The Case of the Capering Camera"	Jesse Hibbs	Jonathan Latimer	N/A	January 16, 1964	1214
A model confronts a photographer about returning negatives used for blackmail. When she pulls his own gun to threaten him, he is shot by someone outside. Cast: Margo Moore (Judith Blair), Paula Raymond (Katherine Ames), Byron Palmer (Harper Green), Karyn Kupcinet (Penny Ames)
197	16	"The Case of the Ice-Cold Hands"	Jesse Hibbs	Jackson Gillis	1962 novel	January 23, 1964	1217
A woman comes to Perry wanting him to redeem bets at the horse track for her. When he does, he learns her brother is wanted for embezzlement. Cast: Joyce Bulifant (Nancy Banks), Dick Davalos (Rodney Banks), Dabbs Greer (Larsen Halstead), Arch Johnson (Marvin Fremont), Phyllis Coates (Inez Fremont), Paul Bryar (Burdette)
198	17	"The Case of the Bountiful Beauty"	Irving J. Moore	Robb White	N/A	February 6, 1964	
A woman unwittingly wrote a very successful book that is based on true stories her boyfriend told her about his step-mother. The stepmother tries to force a big payment and turns up murdered. Cast: Sandra Warner (Stephanie Carew), Ryan O'Neal (John Carew), Douglas Fowley (Rubin Cason), John van Dreelen (Gideon Long), Maxwell Reed (Chet Worth)
199	18	"The Case of the Nervous Neighbor"	Arthur Marks	Samuel Newman	N/A	February 13, 1964	1219
A man hires Paul to find his mother. Paul does, but she is wanted for murdering her husband. Cast: Paul Winchell (Henry Clement), Richard Rust (Charles Fuller), Jeanne Cooper (Mary Browne), Katherine Squire (Vera Hargrove), Sheila Bromley (Alice Fuller Bradley)
200	19	"The Case of the Fifty-Millionth Frenchman"	Arthur Marks	Story by : Robert C. Dennis; Teleplay by : Robert C. Dennis & Jackson Gillis & Samuel Newman	N/A	February 20, 1964	1216
A man has loaned $5,000 to a woman to get away from her abusive husband. When the money is not repaid, he tracks down her husband only to be ignored by him. The husband is then murdered. Cast: David McCallum (Phillipe Bertain), Jacques Bergerac (Armand Rovel), Roxane Berard (Ninette Rovel), Jackie Coogan (Ron Litten), Coleen Gray (Linda Sutton)
201	20	"The Case of the Frightened Fisherman"	Arthur Marks	Jonathan Latimer	N/A	February 27, 1964	1220
A man and his partner have developed a new antibiotic. A competitor wants to buy the company. He discovers his wife is helping the competitor. When she is run down, he is charged. Cast: Mala Powers (Helen Bradshaw), Connie Gilchrist (Mrs. Pennyworth), Lee Farr (Randolph James), Marian Collier (Natalie James), Stacy Keach (Police Lt. Gibson)
202	21	"The Case of the Arrogant Arsonist"	Jesse Hibbs	Samuel Newman	N/A	March 5, 1964	1221
A retired fire chief owns a warehouse that is burned by an arsonist and kills a manager. A TV reporter accuses him of setting the fire and he hires Perry to sue for slander. He is charged with murder when the reporter is killed. Cast: Tom Tully (Carey York), Frank Aletter (Tommy Towne), Russell Thorson (Farrell Moorefield)
203	22	"The Case of the Garrulous Go-Between"	Irving J. Moore	Philip Saltzman	N/A	March 12, 1964	1222
A man is concerned for a woman who hired him to find a man and visits a fortuneteller regularly. He finds the fortuneteller has been partners with the woman's landlord in scams in the past and when the landlord turns up murdered, she is charged. Cast: Sue Randall (Amy Scott), Lori March (Madame Zillia), Jacques Aubuchon (Victor Bundy)
204	23	"The Case of the Woeful Widower"	Irving J. Moore	Jackson Gillis	1951 novel (Note: Title changed from Gardner's original, The Case of the Fiery Fingers)	March 26, 1964	1223
Perry defends two clients: a housekeeper for theft and the stepsister of the murder victim who stands to inherit her estate. Cast: Jerry Van Dyke (James Douglas), Harry Townes (Newton Bain), Nancy Gates (Mary Douglas), Joan Lovejoy (Nellie Conway), Shirley Mitchell (Elizabeth Bain): Remake to season 2 "The Case of the Footloose Doll"
205	24	"The Case of the Simple Simon"	Arthur Marks	Robert C. Dennis	N/A	April 2, 1964	1224
An actress with a traveling four-person show has a young man come forward claiming to be her son she put up for adoption. She asks Perry to help turn him away. Cast: Victor Buono (John Sylvester Fossette), Virginia Field (Ramona Carter), Tom Conway (Guy Penrose), James Stacy (Scott Everett)
206	25	"The Case of the Illicit Illusion"	Irving J. Moore	Samuel Newman	N/A	April 9, 1964	
A woman visits her friend to see why she feels like she is losing her sanity. She can't remember things, which is affecting her work. When an associate of her husband is killed, she is charged with the crime. Cast: Mona Freeman (Rosanne Ambrose), Keith Andes (Dr. Jesse Young), Ron Randell (Hubert Ambrose), Rebecca Welles (Leslie Eden)
207	26	"The Case of the Antic Angel"	Arthur Marks	Robert C. Dennis	N/A	April 16, 1964	
A recovering alcoholic thinks he sees his dead wife leaving a bar. The experience causes him to start drinking and he contacts Perry because she died in a plane crash. Cast: Michael Ansara (Vince Kabat), George Tobias (Sidney Falconer), Peter Breck (William Sherwood), Richard Erdman (Harry Niles)
208	27	"The Case of the Careless Kidnapper"	Jesse Hibbs	Robb White	N/A	April 30, 1964	1227
A doctor comes home to learn that his son has been kidnapped and his wife accidentally killed a boy that was involved. He tries to cover for his wife. Cast: Thomas Lowell (David Pelham), Marilyn Erskine (Susan Pelham), Burt Metcalfe (John Lanthrop), Peter Hobbs (Dr. Gregory Pelham), Ron Kennedy (Joe Velvet)
209	28	"The Case of the Drifting Dropout"	Arthur Marks	Jackson Gillis	N/A	May 7, 1964	1228
A young man has been working for a partner of his dead uncle. Fed up, he quits and is hired to investigate his uncle and the former boss who is murdered. Cast: Cynthia Pepper (Annalee Flaher), Malcolm Atterbury (Dell Harper), Carl Reindel (Barry Davis), Vaughn Taylor (Sanford Harper), Ted de Corsia (Mort Lynch), Neil Hamilton (Grove Dillingham)
210	29	"The Case of the Tandem Target"	Irving J. Moore	Robert C. Dennis	N/A	May 14, 1964	1229
A club singer hoping to save enough to marry his girl hopes to inherit money from her dead father. But her stepfather is standing in the way of both events. He is charged when the stepfather is murdered. Cast: Philip Ober (Sumner Hodge/Adrian Hodge), Ann Rutherford (Mona Hodge), Lonny Chapman (Jack Tailey), Paul Carr (Con Bolton), Pat Priest (Sally Young)
211	30	"The Case of the Ugly Duckling"	Arthur Marks	Richard Landau	N/A	May 21, 1964	1230
A woman can inherit her deceased father's toy company empire if she marries by her next birthday. Her uncle has tried to introduce her to men. He is later found dead after arguing with her. Cast: Anne Whitfield (Alice Trilling), Constance Towers (Natalie Graham), Reginald Gardiner (Albert Charity), Max Showalter (Talbot Sparr)

=== Season 8 (1964–65) ===
No. overall	No. in season	Title	Directed by	Written by	Based on	Original release date
212	1	"The Case of the Missing Button"	Richard D. Donner	Jonathan Latimer	N/A	September 24, 1964
A man is in a tug of war with his wife over their daughter. He feels she is an unfit mother. He is charged with murder when the man he asks to obtain info to be used to fight his wife is killed. Cast: Julie Adams (Janice Blake), Ed Nelson (Dirk Blake), Anthony Eisley (Vince Rome), Otto Kruger (Judge Norris)
213	2	"The Case of the Paper Bullets"	Arthur Marks	Jonathan Latimer	N/A	October 1, 1964
A man is running for senator, but his teenage sister has fallen for his opponent's stepson. When the stepson is murdered, the man's wife is charged. Cast: Richard Anderson (Jason Foster), Lynn Loring (Susan Foster), Ford Rainey (Senator Randolph Cartwell), Patrick McVey (Harry Mardig), Jan Shepard (Margaret Foster), Arthur Space (Edgerton Cartwell), Stewart Moss (David Cartwell)
214	3	"The Case of the Scandalous Sculptor"	Jack Arnold	Philip Saltzman	N/A	October 8, 1964
While a woman is away, her husband tries to get access to $10,000 to pay a blackmailer. He uses his model to concoct his own blackmail scheme, but it backfires when the model is murdered and his wife is charged with it. Cast: June Lockhart (Mona Stanton Harvey), Stuart Erwin (Everett Stanton), Sue Ane Langdon (Bonnie Dunbar), Sean McClory (Hannibal Harvey), Carlos Romero (Nonno Volente)
215	4	"The Case of the Sleepy Slayer"	Jesse Hibbs	Samuel Newman	N/A	October 15, 1964
A secretary for the old curmudgeon has been promised $50,000. When his boss is killed, his niece is accused as she shot him. But he was dead beforehand, so his secretary is charged. Cast: Phyllis Hill (Rachel Gordon), Hugh Marlowe (Dr. Lambert), Gigi Perreau (Phyllis Clover), Richard Hale (Abner Gordon),
216	5	"The Case of the Betrayed Bride"	Arthur Marks	John Elliotte	N/A	October 22, 1964
A woman trails her husband to the USA from France as he left her and illegally married a wealthy heiress. When he is killed, she is charged. Cast: Anne Farge (Marie Claudel Dubois), Dianne Foster (Elaine Meacham), Michael Forest (Pierre Dubois), Jeanette Nolan (Nellie Meacham Dubois), Guy Stockwell (Jimmy Meacham), John Larkin (Todd Meacham), Jacques Aubuchon (Roger Brody), Neil Hamilton (Victor Billings)
217	6	"The Case of the Nautical Knot"	Jesse Hibbs	Robert Leslie Bellem	N/A	October 29, 1964
A nurse is tending to a man in Mexico. When his brother appears saying there are problems with their uncle, he decides to return to L.A. and marry his nurse, but the uncle is killed and the nurse is charged. Cast: Anne Whitfield (Joanna Monford Scott), Lisa Gaye (Pamela Blair), Arline Judge (Emmalou Schneider), Whit Bissell (Laurence Barlow)
218	7	"The Case of the Bullied Bowler"	Jesse Hibbs	Samuel Newman	N/A	November 5, 1964
Paul's friend and his brother are fighting the matron of their town to keep their bowling alley open. She uses a health outbreak as an excuse to close it, but the county health inspector is murdered and Paul's friend is charged. Cast: Mike Connors (Joe Kelly), Anne Seymour (Bonnie Mae Wilmet aka The Duchess), Milton Selzer (Dr. Max Taylor), Robert Harland (Bill Jaris), Jeff Donnell (Rose Carol), Patricia Morrow (Marla Carol)
219	8	"The Case of a Place Called Midnight"	Arthur Marks	Jackson Gillis	N/A	November 12, 1964
While in Europe, Perry makes a side trip, meeting the girlfriend of a family friend who's in the Army. When an officer is murdered, his friend is suspected. Cast: Gerald Mohr (Alan Durfee), Harry Townes (Col. Owens), Robert Emhardt (Frank Appleton), Werner Klemperer (Police Inspector Hurt), Jim Davis (Captain Joe Farrell), Ivan Triesault (Dr. Franz Kleinman)
220	9	"The Case of the Tragic Trophy"	Richard D. Donner	Mann Rubin	N/A	November 19, 1964
A movie producer returns from Mexico supposedly engaged to an aspiring actress. In reality, she is trying to clear her father who the producer claimed worked drunk on a film. Cast: Richard Carlson (Anthony Fry), Mimsy Farmer (Kathy James), Patricia Huston (Lydia Lawrence), John Fiedler (Howard Stark)
221	10	"The Case of the Reckless Rockhound"	Jesse Hibbs	Robb White	N/A	November 26, 1964
A woman has kept a small mine functioning based on diamonds she found herself. When her dead husband's ex-partner returns, he wants half the diamonds, but instead is killed. Cast: Audrey Totter (Reba Burgess), Bruce Bennett (Malone), Elisha Cook (Reelin' Pete), Ben Johnson (Kelly), Jeff Corey (Carl Bascom), Ted de Corsia (Chief Polek)
222	11	"The Case of the Latent Lover"	Jesse Hibbs	Samuel Newman	N/A	December 3, 1964
A man is the head of the probation department so when his friend's husband is arrested, he agrees to help by asking to have him examined. The husband says the man is having an affair with his wife so when she is killed he is charged. Cast: Lloyd Bochner (Eric Pollard), Jason Evers (Roy Galen), Douglass Dumbrille (Judge Alder)
223	12	"The Case of the Wooden Nickels"	Arthur Marks	Jonathan Latimer	N/A	December 10, 1964
A woman asks Paul to complete a secretive deal for her uncle involving the sale of a rare coin. Paul follows the instructions, but finds himself at the uncle's shop where he stumbles into the woman over a man shot to death. Cast: Will Kuluva (Homer Doubleday), Phyllis Love (Minerva Doubleday), Murray Matheson (Howard Hopkins), Walter Burke (Gerald Kelso), Hunt Powers (George Parsons)
224	13	"The Case of the Blonde Bonanza"	Arthur Marks	Jackson Gillis	1962 novel	December 17, 1964
A friend of Della's has quit her job when a man signed her to a modeling contract that Perry discovers allows the agent to take half of any money she comes into. When the agent is murdered, she is charged. Cast: Mary Ann Mobley (Dianne Adler), Michael Constantine (Dillard), Bruce Gordon (George Adler), Vaughn Taylor (Montrose Foster), Paul Gilbert (Harrison Boring), Ruth Warrick (Mrs. Winlock)
225	14	"The Case of the Ruinous Road"	Jesse Hibbs	Robert and Esther Mitchell	N/A	December 31, 1964
A junior engineer for a construction firm that is having cost issues, is uncovering issues with boss. The boss frames the junior engineer for embezzling. The boss is murdered with the junior engineer seen leaving the scene. Cast: Grant Williams (Quincy Davis), Barton MacLane (Archer Osmond), Allen Case (Adam Conrad), Bert Freed (Joe Marshall)
226	15	"The Case of the Frustrated Folk Singer"	Arthur Marks	John Elliotte	N/A	January 7, 1965
A woman arrives in Los Angeles to start a singing career. She is spotted by an agent who signs the naive girl to a contract. When he is killed, she is charged. Cast: Gary Crosby (Jazbo Williams), Bonnie Jones (Amy Jo Jennings), Mark Goddard (Lester Crawforf), Robert H. Harris (Harry Bronson), Richard Garland (Lionel Albright), Joyce Meadows (Audrey Stemple), Lee Meriwether (Natalie Graham)
227	16	"The Case of the Thermal Thief"	Jack Arnold	Robert C. Dennis	N/A	January 14, 1965
A woman is tired of hearing her half-sister memorialize her dead husband so when a woman arrives to return Lona's purse, she takes in her as a friend. The woman who returned the purse steals a necklace and is murdered. Cast: Betty Ackerman (Amy Reid), Barry Sullivan (Ken Kramer), Kathie Browne (Lola Upton), Richard Eastham (Roland Canfield)
228	17	"The Case of the Golden Venom"	Jesse Hibbs	Jackson Gillis	N/A	January 21, 1965
A woman returns home after a year in Europe and her husband died a year earlier and her son was killed before that. She believes her son was murdered and wants revenge. However, she is charged with killing the man she thinks did it. Cast: Lee Philips (Kevin Lawrence), Noah Beery (Tony Claus), Frances Reid (Lucille Forrest), Frank Ferguson (Walter Coffee), Mort Mills (Police Sgt. Ben Landro), Arthur Malet (Ralph Day)
229	18	"The Case of the Telltale Tap"	Arthur Marks	Samuel Newman	N/A	February 4, 1965
A rising accountant works at a company where the CEO's secretary has fallen in love with him. When she learns he loves the niece of the CEO, she turns on him. After they have argued, she is found murdered. Cast: Linden Chiles (Clyde Darrell), Roland Winters (Archer Bryant), Jeanne Bal (Vera Wynne), H. M. Wynant (Glen Holman)
230	19	"The Case of the Feather Cloak"	Jesse Hibbs	Jonathan Latimer	N/A	February 11, 1965
While in Hawaii to check on property for a hotel development, Perry is asked to help a woman who owns a critical piece of property. Her fiancé breaks their engagement and is murdered. Cast: Jon Hall (Police Lt. Kia), David Opatoshu (Prof. Gustave Heller), John van Dreelen (Jarvis Logan), Michael Dante (Douglas Kelland), Wende Wagner (Anona Gilbert), Joyce Jameson (Dolly Jameson), Keye Luke (Choy)
231	20	"The Case of the Lover's Gamble"	Harry Harris	Jackson Gillis	N/A	February 18, 1965
A woman is offered the chance to live with her professor and his wife, who is recovering from an accident. She becomes suspicious that he may try to harm his wife who is set to inherit $2,000,000. When he is murdered, she is charged. Cast: Hal Peary (Freddy Fell), Margaret Bly (Betty Kaster), Donald Murphy (Dr. Philip Stark), Joan O'Brien (Jill Fenwick), June Dayton (Frances Stark)
232	21	"The Case of the Fatal Fetish"	Charles R. Rondeau	Samuel Newman	N/A	March 4, 1965
The assistant D.A. to Burger has a girlfriend with expensive tastes. She is disliked by his mother and becomes a tool to make it look like the assistant D.A. is messing with a legal case. He's seen over her body stabbed with his mother's prop. Cast: Fay Wray (Mignon Germaine), Karen Steele (Carina Wileen), Alan Hewitt (Curt Ordway), Gary Collins (Larry Germaine), Lynn Bari (Ruth Duncan), Douglas Kennedy (Brady Duncan), Richard Devon (Attorney Neil Howard), James Griffith (Jack Randall)
233	22	"The Case of the Sad Sicilian"	Jesse Hibbs	Milton Krims	N/A	March 11, 1965
An Italian is seeing the sights and getting around by visiting Italian families. He visits the Bacio family which stirs up a family feud. The elder Bacio is killed and he is charged. Cast: Margo (Serafina Bacio), Nico Minardos (Giangiacomo Bacio), Anthony Caruso (Enrico Bacio), Fabrizio Mioni (Paulo Porro), Dabbs Greer (Dodson)
234	23	"The Case of the Murderous Mermaid"	Robert Sparr	Mann Rubin	N/A	March 18, 1965
Paul meets an aspiring actress who is game for stunts that will get her recognized. When she agrees to fill in for a famous female swimmer who is too ill to swim, the stunt blows up with the woman dead and she is charged. Cast: Patrice Wymore (Victoria Dawn), Bill Williams (Charlie Shaw), Jean Hale (Reggie Lansfield)
235	24	"The Case of the Careless Kitten"	Vincent McEveety	Jackson Gillis	1942 novel	March 25, 1965
A woman is living with her aunt. She receives a call one night from a man claiming to be her aunt's husband who has been missing for 10 years. Perry goes with her to meet him, but they find another man dead. Cast: Louise Latham (Matilda Shore), Allan Melvin (Thomas Link), Julie Sommars (Helen Kendall)
236	25	"The Case of the Deadly Debt"	Jesse Hibbs	Robert C. Dennis	N/A	April 1, 1965
A Los Angeles cop resigns when a mobster he is investigating contacts his family after his dad dies. The cop is seen by Perry leaving a dead man's cabin. Cast: Chris Robinson (Carl Talbert), Robert Quarry (Danny Talbert), Allison Hayes (Stella Radom), Sheila Bromley (Mrs. Talbert)
237	26	"The Case of the Gambling Lady"	Richard D. Donner	Jonathan Latimer	N/A	April 8, 1965
A man owns a novelty company and is divorcing his wife who has developed a gambling habit. She becomes involved in a scheme to pass chips at Nevada casinos with evidence her husband made them. When she is murdered, he is charged. Cast: Peter Breck (Pete Warren), Jesse White (Tony Cerro), Ruta Lee (Irene Prentiss), Myrna Fahey (Myrna Warren)
238	27	"The Case of the Duplicate Case"	James Goldstone	Philip Saltzman	N/A	April 22, 1965
A retired baseball player who is now working as a shoe insert salesman and his wife is an accountant at a store. After a fire in her office, she is murdered and her husband is charged. Cast: Martin West (Herbert Cornwall), Susan Bay (Millie Cornwall), Steve Ihnat (Charlie Parks), Douglass Dumbrille (Judge)
239	28	"The Case of the Grinning Gorilla"	Jesse Hibbs	Jackson Gillis	1952 novel	April 29, 1965
Perry helps a woman after Della buys the diary of a girl who committed suicide. Her ex-boss has been telling people she is a thief so she sued him. Perry must rescue her from a gorilla trapping her with her dead boss. Cast: Victor Buono (Nathan Fallan), Charlene Holt (Helen Cadmus), Lurene Tuttle (Josephine Kempton), Gavin MacLeod (Mortimer Hershey),
240	29	"The Case of the Wrongful Writ"	Richard Kinon	Samuel Newman	N/A	May 6, 1965
A man is approached by someone claiming to be a government agent asking him to use his father's export business to help in a secret project. When the agent is murdered, he is charged. Cast: James Shigeta (Ward Toyama), Philip Abbott (Harry Grant), Peter Whitney (Capt. Otto Varnum), Bobby Troup (Smitty), Katherine Squire (Esther Norden), Douglas Henderson (Frank Jones), Nobu McCarthy (Sally Choshi)
241	30	"The Case of the Mischievous Doll"	Jesse Hibbs	Jackson Gillis	1963 novel	May 13, 1965
A woman bursts into Perry's office so he can verify who she is. She won't give details, but says she is mixed up in some scheme. Della spots a gun in her purse. When the man who hired her is killed, she is charged. Cast: Ben Cooper (Clyde Jasper), Marge Redmond (Henrietta Hull)

=== Season 9 (1965–66) ===
No. overall	No. in season	Title	Directed by	Written by	Based on	Original release date
242	1	"The Case of the Laughing Lady"	Jesse Hibbs	Orville H. Hampton	N/A	September 12, 1965
A woman is in jail awaiting her trial for murder. She has fired or lost multiple attorneys, so Perry is given her case. She tells him about proof of her innocence, but even Perry has a hard time believing her story. Cast: Constance Towers (Leona Devore), Jean Hale (Carla Chaney), John Abbott (Dr. Durwood Tobey), Bernard Fox (Peter Stange), John Dall (Roan Daniel), Allison Hayes (Cho Sin)
243	2	"The Case of the Fatal Fortune"	Arthur Marks	William Bast	N/A	September 19, 1965
A fortune teller tells a woman that she will get married, but it will end tragically. She later marries her boss who is a client and good friend of Perry's. A few weeks later he dies from an apparent case of poisoning. Cast: Julie Adams (Patricia L. Kean), Lee Philips (Gordon Evans), Jesse White (Max Armstead), Ford Rainey (Dr. Fisher), Nan Martin (Beth Fuller)
244	3	"The Case of the Candy Queen"	Jesse Hibbs	Orville H. Hampton, Robb White	1940 novel (Note: Title changed from Gardner's original, The Case of the Silent Partner)	September 26, 1965
A woman falls for a gambler. When her secret candy recipe is stolen, a casino owner is killed and she is charged. Cast: Nancy Gates (Claire Armstrong), Patricia Smith (Wanda Buren), John Archer (Harry Arnold): Remake to season 1 "The Case of the Silent Partner"
245	4	"The Case of the Cheating Chancellor"	Arthur Marks	Lawrence Louis Goldman	N/A	October 3, 1965
A man is an instructor at Perry's alma mater. He is working on his PhD and the person he is working with is taking advantage of him by claiming credit for their combined work. Cast: Louise Latham (Shirley Logan), G. B. Atwater (Dr. Stuart Logan), Lee Meriwether (Evelyn Wilcox), Adrienne Ellis (Myra Finlay), Stacy Keach (Judge)
246	5	"The Case of the Impetuous Imp"	Arthur Marks	William Bast	1950 novel (Note: Title changed from Gardner's original, The Case of the Negligent Nymph)	October 10, 1965
A woman is assisted from the water after stealing a message in a bottle from her dead aunt's home. She believes the man her aunt married murdered her. Perry must first defend her for theft, but when the man is killed, she is charged. Cast: Bonnie Jones (Diana Carter), Hanna Landy (Helga Dolwig), Richard Webb (Addison Powell): Remake to season 1 "The Case of the Negligent Nymph"
247	6	"The Case of the Carefree Coronary"	Jesse Hibbs	Orville H. Hampton	N/A	October 17, 1965
Perry is called in to investigate why an insurance company is near bankruptcy due to excessive claims. He calls in a claimant who appears to be healthy, but dies when forced to come in for an exam, putting Perry in the hot seat. Cast: Bruce Bennett (Reve Watson), Benny Baker (Jerry Ormond), Whit Bissell (Dennison Groody), Hal Baylor (Jack David), Shirley Mitchell (Marilyn David), music by Leigh Harline
248	7	"The Case of the Hasty Honeymooner"	Arthur Marks	Ernest Frankel, Orville H. Hampton, John Elliotte	N/A	October 24, 1965
A man asks Perry for a will for his wife-to-be. When a dating service contacts Perry about the man, Perry looks deeper into his history. Cast: Noah Beery (Lucas Tolliver), K.T. Stevens (Alice Munford), Hugh Marlowe (Guy Munford), Cathy Downs (Millicent Barton Tolliver), Strother Martin (Roy Hutchinson)
249	8	"The Case of the 12th Wildcat"	Jesse Hibbs	Ernest Frankel	N/A	October 31, 1965
A woman is the primary owner of a football team. Her husband owns ten percent. He was a successful college player, but is now a drunk gambler. When he is killed, she is charged. Cast: Mona Freeman (Ellen Payne), Bill Williams (Burt Payne), Regis Toomey (Andy Grant), John Conte (Judson Warner), Karl Swenson (Unk Hazekian), and cameo appearances by Los Angeles Rams players Don Chuy, Roman Gabriel, Cliff Livingston, Marlin McKeever, Bill Munson and Joe Scibelli
250	9	"The Case of the Wrathful Wraith"	Arthur Marks	Henry Farrell	N/A	November 7, 1965
Perry successfully defends a woman when she is charged with killing her husband. It appears she killed him again when it turns out he was still alive. Cast: Gene Lyons (Ralph Balfour), Geraldine Wall (Mrs. Stallman)
251	10	"The Case of the Runaway Racer"	Jesse Hibbs	Sy Salkowitz	N/A	November 14, 1965
A race car driver is in a new partnership. After the fact, he asked Perry to look it over and he discovers problems. When he has an accident in a test car, it starts a series of events leading to the murder of his partner. Cast: Anthony Caruso (Harvey Rettig), Michael Constantine (Pappy Ryan), Gavin MacLeod (Dan Platte)
252	11	"The Case of the Silent Six"	Jesse Hibbs	William Bast	N/A	November 21, 1965
A woman is beaten within an inch of her life while her neighbors sit and do nothing. Her brother runs to the apartment to check on his sister and is knocked unconscious as a man is killed. Cast: Skip Homeier (Police Sgt. Dave Wolfe), Dianne Foster (Linda Blakely), Cyril Delevanti (Craig Jefferson), Chris Noel (Susan Wolfe)
253	12	"The Case of the Fugitive Fraulein"	Arthur Marks	Jonathan Latimer	N/A	November 28, 1965
Perry is asked to help get a scientist's granddaughter out of East Germany so she can live with her mother's parents. A go-between is murdered during negotiations and the scientist's wife is charged so Perry defends her in East Germany. Cast: Susanne Cramer (Gerta), Jeanette Nolan (Emma Ritter), Ronald Long (Franz Hoffer)
254	13	"The Case of the Baffling Bug"	Vincent McEveety	Orville H. Hampton	N/A	December 12, 1965
A doctor works for a company developing a new secret process. The company hires Paul to ensure security for a meeting, but the details leak. The doctor had worked for the competition so when a man is killed in his lab, he is charged. Cast: Grant Williams (Dr. Todd Meade), Byron O'Byrne (Borace Lehigh), Mary Treen (Bess)
255	14	"The Case of the Golden Girls"	Jesse Hibbs	Orville H. Hampton, Ernest Frankel	1940 novel	December 19, 1965
A man picks up a young lady hitchhiking which results in being blackmailed by her. He is part owner of a storied men's club, but a new co-owner is changing the format. When the new owner is killed, he is charged and the hitchhiker is a key witness. Cast: Philip Bourneuf (Victor Montalvo), Angela Dorian (Debbie Conrad), Jean Engstrom (Corinne Richland), George Neise (Stacey Garnett): Remake to season 1 "The Case of the Vagabond Vixen"
256	15	"The Case of the Bogus Buccaneers"	Arthur Hiller	Henry Farrell	N/A	January 9, 1966
An ex-con is given a job playing a TV pirate giving gifts to selected viewers. He arrives at an address where an angry woman answers wanting her money. He fights to leave and an eye witness identifies him as her killer. Cast: Rhodes Reason (Martin Eldridge), Patricia Cutts (Ann Eldridge), Kathleen Crowley (Grace Elders Knapp)
257	16	"The Case of the Midnight Howler"	Jesse Hibbs	Robert E. Kent	N/A	January 16, 1966
Perry is Burger's primary witness against his client as he ran into her as she left the scene of the crime, plus the murder was heard on the radio. Cast: Myrna Fahey (Holly Andrews), Daniel J. Travanti (Barney Austin), Lee Patterson, Ian Wolfe
258	17	"The Case of the Vanishing Victim"	Harmon Jones	Ernest Frankel, Orville H. Hampton	1954 novel (Note: Title changed from Gardner's original, The Case of the Fugitive Nurse; filmed under the original title in 1958 as episode #22)	January 23, 1966
A woman is charged with poisoning her husband when he is killed in a plane he was piloting. Cast: Lisa Gaye (Laraine Keely), Jeanne Cooper (Miriam Fielding), George Wallace (Stacey Fielding), Richard Erdman (Jud Bennett), Remake to season 1 "The Case of the Fugitive Nurse"
259	18	"The Case of the Golfer's Gambit"	Jesse Hibbs	Orville H. Hampton	N/A	January 30, 1966
An aspiring pro at a golf club must contend with the current pro who was kicked off the professional circuit for his behavior. The current pro is killed with the inspiring pro's club after threatening him with blackmail. Cast: Carl Reindel (Danny Bright), Harry Townes (Erwin Brandt), Dennis Patrick (Chick Farley), Gertrude Flynn (Rosalind/Mrs. Hedrick)
260	19	"The Case of the Sausalito Sunrise"	Jesse Hibbs	Ernest Frankel, Orville H. Hampton	1952 novel (Note: Title changed from Gardner's original, The Case of the Moth-Eaten Mink)	February 13, 1966
A cop discovers an art dealer is selling a stolen painting. When the cop is found dead in the gallery, Perry defends the dealer and an employee, and Paul must pose as a truck driver to uncover the real fencing operation. Cast: Francine York (Bobbi Dane), Donald Murphy (Francis Clune), Allan Melvin (Bert Kannon), Peter Mamakos (Olaf Deering): Remake to season 1 "The case of the Moth Eaten-Mink"
261	20	"The Case of the Scarlet Scandal"	Jerry Hopper	Kenneth M. Rosen	N/A	February 20, 1966
A woman's boyfriend is charged with killing his sponsor. Perry and Paul decide to investigate. Based on their findings, he is freed and the woman is charged instead. Cast: Will Hutchins (Donald Hobart), Luana Patten (Cynthia Perkins), Mala Powers (Elaine Bayler), Richard Devon (Ed Kesko), Connie Gilchrist (Natasha)
262	21	"The Case of the Twice-Told Twist"	Jesse Hibbs	Samuel Newman	N/A	February 27, 1966
A teenager in a car-stripping gang is caught after Perry's car is stripped. Perry sees something good in the teen, giving him a second chance. When a ringleader of the gang is stabbed to death, the teen is charged. Only episode of the series filmed in color; characters inspired by those in Oliver Twist. Cast: Victor Buono (Ben Huggins), Lisa Seagram (Robin Spring)
263	22	"The Case of the Avenging Angel"	Jerry Hopper	Lawrence Louis Goldman	N/A	March 13, 1966
Perry is hired to help foster the career of singer and the man hiring Perry wants his name kept secret. Perry contacts a man to do the job, but his actions cause Perry to regret it. Cast: Richard Carlson (Clete Hawley), Sue Ann Langdon (Dotty Merrill), Lurene Tuttle (Henny McLeod), Chick Chandler (Riff Lawler)
264	23	"The Case of the Tsarina's Tiara"	Harmon Jones	Ernest Frankel, Orville H. Hampton	N/A	March 20, 1966
Perry takes a client with questionable jewelry to another client in the building to have the jewelry appraised. A partner in the jewelry business is later found with a dead body in the trunk of his car. Cast: Virginia Field (Madame Sonya Galinova), Leonid Kinskey (Vyacheslav Gerznov), Wesley Addy (Joachim DeVry), Carlos Romero (Ricardo Arena)
265	24	"The Case of the Fanciful Frail"	Jesse Hibbs	Ernest Frankel, Orville H. Hampton	1958 novel (Note: Title changed from Gardner's original, The Case of the Footloose Doll)	March 27, 1966
A woman thinks she is about to be married, but finds herself accused of stealing money from her company. On the run, she changes identities with another woman who dies in an accident. When her fiancé is killed, she is charged. Cast: Pippa Scott (Ethel Andrews), Barry Kelley (Mr. Park Milgrave), Arch Johnson (Frank Carruthers), Coleen Gray (Martha Erskine), Hunt Powers (Bruce Strickland)
266	25	"The Case of the Unwelcome Well"	Harmon Jones	Ernest Frankel, Orville H. Hampton	N/A	April 3, 1966
A small-time oil operator is working for an oil tycoon. When the tycoon decides to delay for 10 years the production of an oil field that the operator discovered, he is murdered. Cast: Wendell Corey (Jerome Klee), Les Tremayne (Harry Lannon), James Best (Allan Winford), Gloria Talbott (Minna Rohan)
267	26	"The Case of the Dead Ringer"	Arthur Marks	Jackson Gillis	N/A	April 17, 1966
Perry loses a patent case for a woman whose father had died. A missing letter would prove her case, but the other side used a sailor who looks like Perry to implicate him in bribery. Only episode in which Raymond Burr plays a dual role. Cast: Raymond Burr (Grimes), Indus Arthur (Barbara Kramer), Arlene Martel (Sandra Dunkel)
268	27	"The Case of the Misguided Model"	Jerry Hopper	Ernest Frankel, Orville H. Hampton	N/A	April 24, 1966
An ex-boxer tries to protect his girlfriend and thinks he accidentally killed a man. He tells Perry, but refuses to go to the police. When another man is arrested for the murder, Perry is caught in a bind. Cast: Mary Ann Mobley (Sharon Carmody), Paul Lukather (Dennis 'Duke' Maronek), James Griffith (Jake Stearns),
269	28	"The Case of the Positive Negative"	Jesse Hibbs	Robert E. Kent	N/A	May 1, 1966
A general has been asked by a group to head an anti-corruption committee by the governor. However, compromising pictures arrive showing the general's wife. Cast: Brian Donlevy (Major General Roger Brandon), Dabbs Greer (Bill Cotton), Simon Scott (Stanley Overton), Ted de Corsia (George Emory)
270	29	"The Case of the Crafty Kidnapper"	Jerry Hopper	William Bast	N/A	May 15, 1966
After an incident at a party, a man goes outside to drive a drunken man home. The driver is arrested for shooting the drunk who is dead. The case is difficult to solve due to a baby's kidnapping. Cast: Gary Collins (Alex Tanner), Cloris Leachman (Gloria Shine), Douglas Henderson (Greg Stanley), Anne Whitfield (Patricia Tanner), Pat Priest (Norma Fenn), Walter Burke (Adams)
271	30	"The Case of the Final Fade-Out"	Jesse Hibbs	Ernest Frankel, Orville H. Hampton	N/A	May 22, 1966
A man has become a major star. At the last moment, he tells his producer that he won't be signing a new contract. The man and his producer are killed, giving Perry two clients back-to-back. Cast: James Stacy (Barry Conrad), Estelle Winwood (Winnifred Glover), Jackie Coogan (Pete Desmond), Denver Pyle (Jackson Sidemark), Dick Clark (Leif Early), Gerald Mohr (Andy Rubin), Marlyn Mason (Erna Landry), Kenneth MacDonald (First judge), William Tannen (Frank), Perry Mason creator Erle Stanley Gardner (Second judge, uncredited), and cameo appearances by executive producer Gail Patrick Jackson and other production crew

== Notable episodes ==
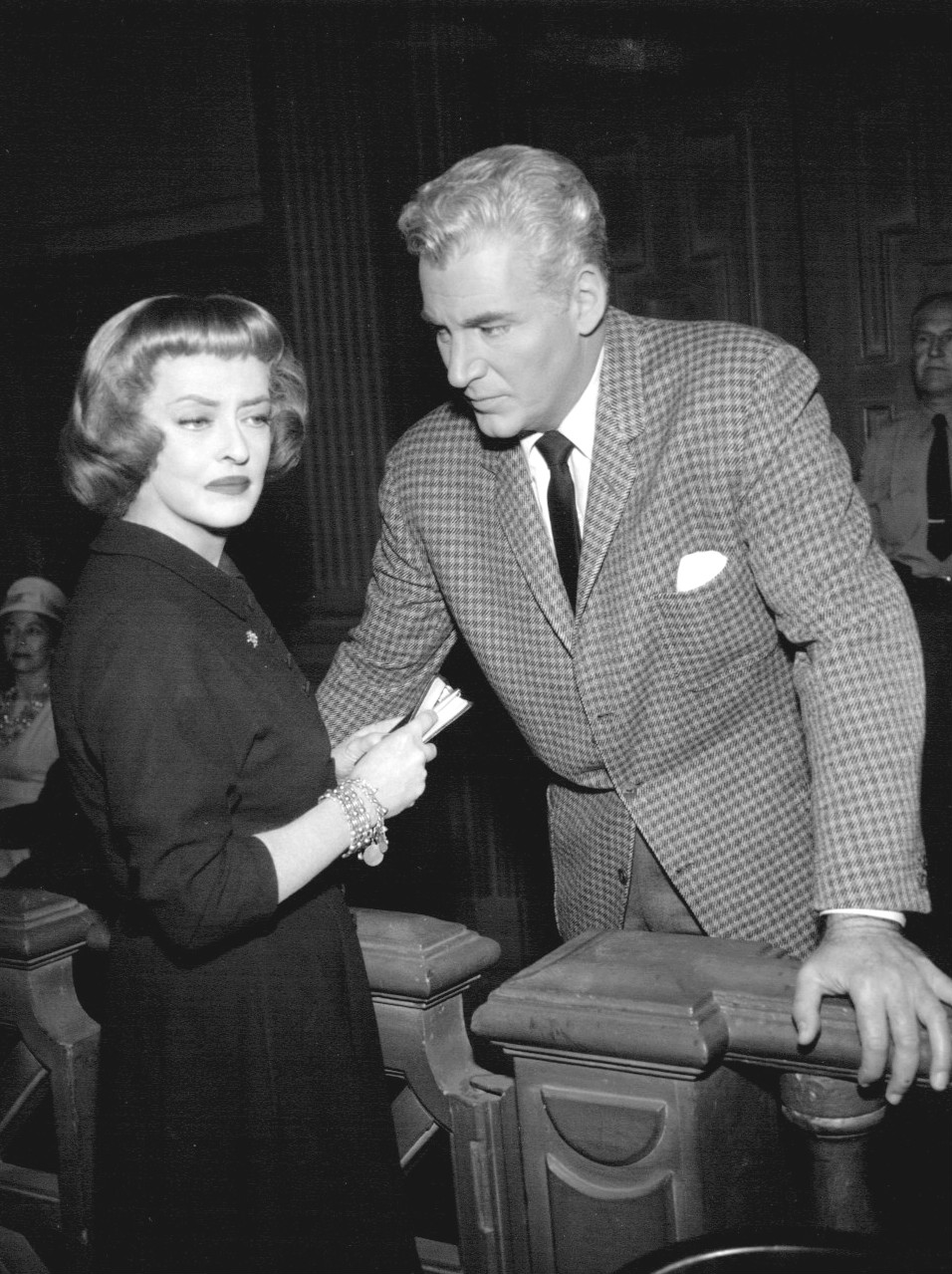
Special guest star Bette Davis and William Hopper in "The Case of Constant Doyle" (January 31, 1963)

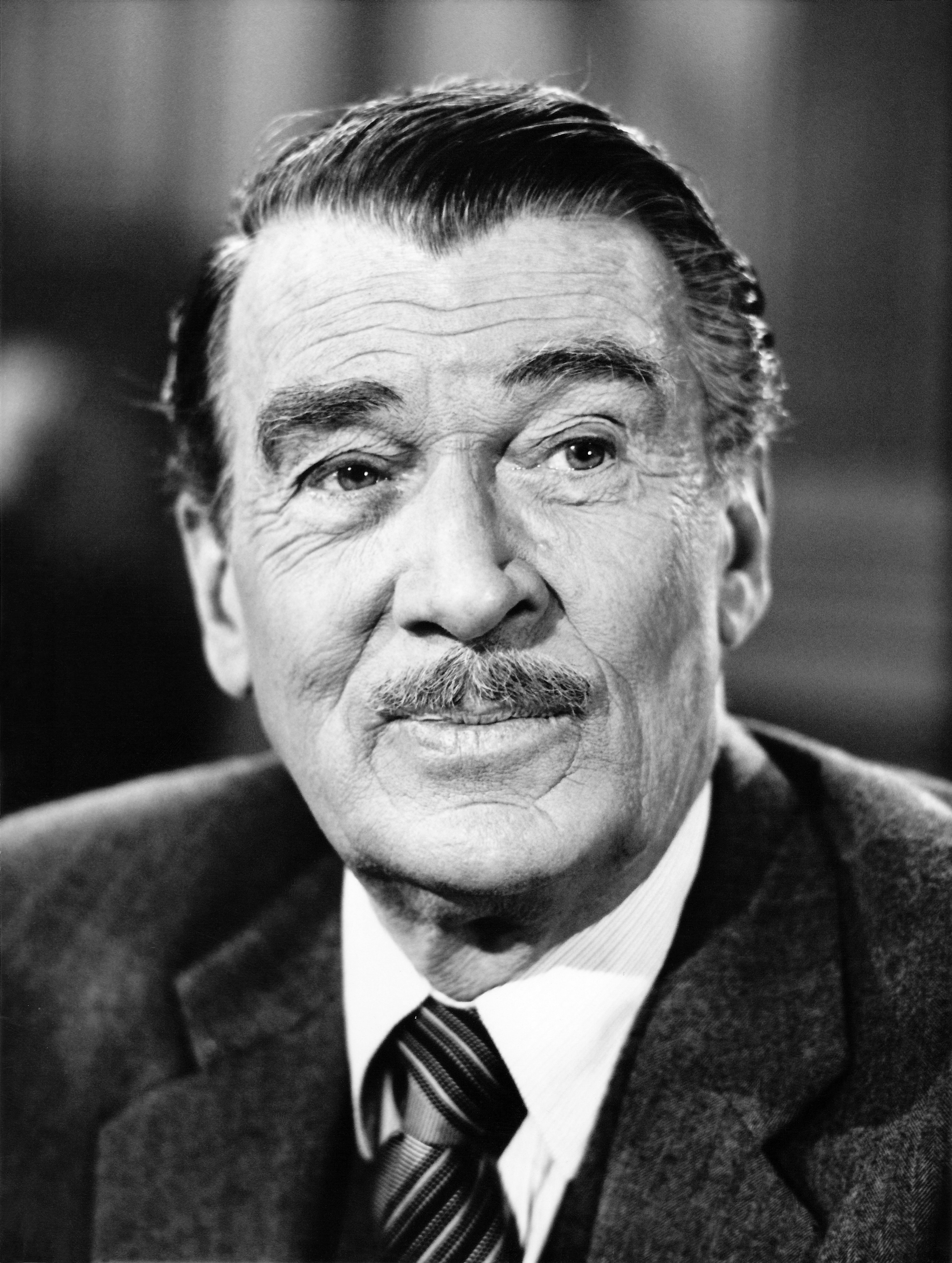
Special guest star Walter Pidgeon in "The Case of the Surplus Suitor" (February 28, 1963)

"The Case of the Moth-Eaten Mink" (episode 1–13) was the pilot film for the Perry Mason series. It was filmed October 3–9, 1956, more than a year before it aired. Written and directed like a film noir second feature, it was a hit with CBS executives and earned the series a good time slot for the 1957–58 season.

In four episodes adapted from Erle Stanley Gardner novels — "The Case of the Silent Partner" (episode 1–6), "The Case of the Baited Hook" (episode 1–14), "The Case of the Velvet Claws" (episode 6-22) and "The Case of the Careless Kitten" (episode 8-24) — the cases are solved without ever going into the courtroom. "Although Gardner's Mason had often maneuvered so successfully on his clients' behalf that they never had to appear in court", wrote film scholar Thomas Leitch, "television episodes without such scenes are highly unusual."

"The Case of the Terrified Typist" (episode 1-38), "The Case of the Witless Witness" (episode 6-28) and the much-hyped "The Case of the Deadly Verdict" (episode 7–4) (Note: Gail Patrick Jackson released teasers to the press about ""The Case of the Deadly Verdict", which begins with Perry Mason's client being convicted and sentenced to death. "Presumably this is the first time in six years that Mason, played by Raymond Burr, has been called upon to register surprise", wrote The New York Times.) are episodes in which Perry Mason loses cases in some form or manner. He has implicitly lost a capital case in "The Case of the Desperate Daughter" (episode 1-27); Mason and Della Street are first seen preparing a last-minute appeal for a "Mr. Hudson" who has an impending date with the gas chamber.

At least a couple of actors who appeared in episodes went onto have highly successful film careers. Robert Redford is amongst the supporting cast in “The Case of the Treacherous Toupée" (episode 4–1), while Burt Reynolds features in “The Case of the Counterfeit Crank” (episode 5-27).

William Talman (Hamilton Burger) was fired by CBS March 18, 1960, hours after he entered a not-guilty plea to misdemeanor charges related to his presence at a party that was raided by police. The schedule was immediately juggled to minimize Talman's presence on the show. (Note: The broadcast March 19, 1960, was a rerun of "The Case of the Perjured Parrot" (episode 2-11), in which Talman appears only in the title sequence.) (Note: On March 26, 1960, "The Case of the Bashful Burro" (episode 3-19) replaced the previously announced episode, "The Case of the Credulous Quarry", in which Talman appears.) "The Case of the Crying Cherub" (episode 3-20) debuts a pared-down title sequence that omits Talman; he is credited only in the last four episodes he filmed before he was fired. (Note: The four episodes Talman filmed before he was dropped by CBS are "The Case of the Irate Inventor" (episode 3-25), "The Case of the Flighty Father" (episode 3-26), "The Case of the Treacherous Toupée" (episode 4-1) and "The Case of the Credulous Quarry" (episode 4-2).) Talman was defended by Gail Patrick Jackson, Burr and others, but even dismissal of the charges in June did not soften the network's position. Patrick said that the role of Burger would not be recast, but that various actors would play assistant district attorneys. CBS reinstated Talman only after Gardner himself weighed in, together with millions of viewers. (Note: "In my book Bill Talman is a great artist", Erle Stanley Gardner wrote. "As far as I am personally concerned, I would like to see him back on the Perry Mason show. I think every member of Paisano Productions feels the same way that I do.") Talman went back to work December 9, 1960, and Burger first returned in "The Case of the Fickle Fortune" (episode 4–15). (Note: In a May 2014 interview, Barbara Hale said that only by chance was she not at the same party where Talman was arrested.) Burger was not in the following two episodes and returns again in "The Case of the Angry Dead Man" (episode 4–18).

"The Case of the Counterfeit Crank" (episode 5-27) is a rare episode in which Perry Mason calls his own defendant to the witness stand.

"The Case of the Weary Watchdog" (episode 6–9) is a rare episode that has a jury trial, a case goes to deliberations, Della Street testifies, Perry's own client testifies, Della Street will be charged as an accomplice and Perry sticks himself into another court proceeding to free his client.

In October 1962, Gail Patrick Jackson announced that four episodes from season six would feature special guest stars who would cover for Raymond Burr during his convalescence from surgery. (Note: Burr was hospitalized in Los Angeles December 10, 1962, for major intestinal surgery.) Perry Mason fan Bette Davis began filming "The Case of Constant Doyle" (episode 6–16) December 12, 1962. The other three special episodes are "The Case of the Libelous Locket" (episode 6–17) starring Michael Rennie; "The Case of the Two-Faced Turnabout" (episode 6–18) starring Hugh O'Brian; and "The Case of the Surplus Suitor" (episode 6–19) starring Walter Pidgeon. To provide continuity, brief scenes were shot in Burr's hospital room that showed Mason speaking on the phone to each of the attorney friends who was managing his caseload while he was in Europe.

"The Case of the Capering Camera" (episode 7–15), filmed in October 1963, marks the last appearance by Ray Collins as the irascible and often-incorrect Lt. Tragg. Although it was clear Collins would not return to work on the series, his name appeared in the opening title sequence through the eighth season, which ended in May 1965. Executive producer Gail Patrick Jackson was aware that Collins watched the show every week and did not wish to discourage him. Collins died of emphysema July 11, 1965.

When Burr was hospitalized for jaw surgery in 1964, special guest stars substituted for him in two episodes. The first, "The Case of the Bullied Bowler" (episode 8–7), was regarded as one of the best episodes of the season. Taking place while Mason is in Europe, the episode stars Mike Connors as an attorney friend of Paul Drake. (Note: Airing the following week, "The Case of a Place Called Midnight" (episode 8-8) plays off Mason's absence; set in Germany, it features no regular cast member other than Burr.) Broadcast two months later, the second episode was "The Case of the Thermal Thief" (episode 8–16), starring Barry Sullivan. These are the only two Perry Mason episodes in which Burr makes no appearance.

"The Case of the Fatal Fetish" (episode 8-21) is the first of four episodes in which Burr shows the effects of an injury suffered in January 1965 following his third visit to U.S. military personnel in South Vietnam. He required surgery after tearing his shoulder tendons, and wears a large plaster cast under his clothing in that episode (Note: "I know you've been out of the office because of your accident, Mr. Mason", Mignon Germaine (Fay Wray) says at the beginning of Perry Mason's first scene in "The Case of the Fatal Fetish".) and in "The Case of the Sad Sicilian" (episode 8-22). (Note: "How's your arm?" Hamilton Burger asks Mason in "The Case of the Sad Sicilian". "It hurts", Mason replies.) His right arm is in a sling in "The Case of the Murderous Mermaid" (episode 8-23) (Note: Paul Drake refers to Mason's sling while speaking to him on the phone in "The Case of the Murderous Mermaid".) and "The Case of the Careless Kitten" (episode 8-24). (Note: There was confusion and mystery about how Burr was injured. The press reported that he was hurt in a helicopter accident in Vietnam, but Gail Patrick Jackson privately shared with Erle Stanley Gardner that he was hurt after completing his tour of Southeast Asia, on the beach at Kauai. This was confirmed in 2011 by Robert Benevides.)

"The Case of the Mischievous Doll" (episode 8-30) features the last appearance of Wesley Lau as Lt. Anderson.

"The Case of the Twice-Told Twist" (episode 9-21) is the only episode of the series that was filmed in color.

"The Case of the Dead Ringer" (episode 9-26) features Burr in a unique dual role, playing Mason and his doppelgänger, a grizzled seadog hired to impersonate and discredit him.

"The Case of the Final Fade-Out" (episode 9-30), the last episode of the series, was filmed April 12–19, 1966. Perry Mason creator Erle Stanley Gardner makes his sole appearance as an actor, playing the judge presiding at the second trial. It was Gail Patrick Jackson's idea to give Gardner and other behind-the-scenes members of the production crew a chance to appear in uncredited cameos:

- Witness 1 is prop man Ray Thompson.
- Witness 2 is accountant Bernie Oseransky.
- Witness 3 is Johnny Nickolaus, director of photography.
- Witness 4 is electrician Bob Kaplan.
- Assistant prop man John Ferry portrays director Phil Shields.
- Assistant director Gordon Webb is the assistant director.
- Second grip Wendell Jones is photographer Tad Wyman.
- Script supervisor Marshall Schlom is Cliff, the script supervisor.
- Sound engineer Herman Lewis plays the sound mixer.
- The second assistant director is Dave Marks, second assistant director and father of producer Arthur Marks.
- Mill foreman Buck Jones appears as himself.
- Construction coordinator Mickey Woods appears as himself.
- Ann Bernaducci, secretary to producer Arthur Marks, plays the producer's secretary.
- Costumer Evelyn Carruth (with her dog, Buff) is the costumer.
- Assistant cameraman Dennis Dalzell is the assistant cameraman.
- Camera operator Jack Woolf is the camera operator.
- Key grip Harry Jones appears as himself.
- Dimmer boy and practical Jim Lowery plays himself.
- Gaffer Larry Peets plays himself.
- Best boy Cece Lupton plays himself.
- Film editor Dick Farrell is the cutter.
- Hairdresser Annabell Levy appears as herself.
- Makeup man Irving Pringle plays himself.
- Director Jesse Hibbs is the man waxing the car.
- Barbara Hale plays a second role, a blonde starlet in sunglasses.
- The man at her table who kisses her is producer Arthur Marks.
- Art director Lewis Creber is the man who interrupts them.
- Actor Mark Roberts is one of the men in the background.
- Set decorator Carl Biddiscombe is one of the men in the background.
- Bill Swan, executive assistant to Raymond Burr, is the piano player.
- Executive producer Gail Patrick Jackson is seated at the bar, speaking to producer Art Seid.
- Thomas Cornwell Jackson, Patrick's husband at the time, Erle Stanley Gardner's literary agent, and a partner in Paisano Productions, is the bartender.
- Lester Salkow, Burr's agent, is the man talking to the bartender.
- Anne Nelson, vice president of business affairs for CBS Entertainment, is the barmaid.

The second murder victim is Jackson Sidemark, a producer whose name is an in-joke — a composite of the surnames of Paisano partners Gail Patrick Jackson and Thomas Cornwell Jackson ("Jackson") and producers Art Seid and Arthur Marks ("Sidemark").

The sequence in the bar was the last Perry Mason scene to be filmed. In her sole appearance in the series, Gail Patrick Jackson broke the rule against ad libs. The script called for her to say, "I wouldn't take that show if they begged me. Who wants that time slot?" Instead she said, "I wouldn't take that show. Who wants to be opposite Bonanza?" It is a final commentary on the tables being turned by the NBC series that Perry Mason had bested in the Nielsen ratings for its first two seasons.
