= Cheyenne Takes Over =

1947 film directed by Ray Taylor

- Theatrical release poster
- Directed by: Ray Taylor
- Screenplay by: Arthur E. Orloff
- Produced by: Jerry Thomas
- Starring: Lash LaRue; Al St. John; Nancy Gates; George Chesebro; Lee Morgan; John Merton
- Cinematography: Ernest Miller
- Edited by: Joseph Gluck
- Music by: Walter Greene
- Production company: Producers Releasing Corporation
- Distributed by: Producers Releasing Corporation
- Release date: December 17, 1947
- Running time: 58 minutes
- Country: United States
- Language: English

Cheyenne Takes Over is a 1947 American Western film directed by Ray Taylor and written by Arthur E. Orloff. The film stars Lash LaRue, Al St. John, Nancy Gates, George Chesebro, Lee Morgan and John Merton. The film was released on December 17, 1947, by Producers Releasing Corporation.

== Cast ==
- Lash LaRue as Cheyenne Davis
- Al St. John as Fuzzy
- Nancy Gates as Fay Wilkins
- George Chesebro as Wayne Dawson
- Lee Morgan as Delhaven
- John Merton as Bart McCord
- Steve Clark as Sheriff
- Bob Woodward as Anderson
- Marshall Reed as Wayne Dawson
- Budd Buster as Lem Boswick
- Carl Mathews as Messenger
- Dee Cooper as Johnson
- Buster Slaven as Bailey
