= Thunder in God's Country =

1951 film by George Blair

- Theatrical release poster
- Directed by: George Blair
- Screenplay by: Arthur E. Orloff
- Produced by: Melville Tucker
- Starring: Rex Allen; Mary Ellen Kay; Buddy Ebsen; Ian MacDonald; Paul Harvey; Harry Lauter
- Cinematography: John MacBurnie
- Edited by: Harold Minter
- Music by: Stanley Wilson
- Production company: Republic Pictures
- Distributed by: Republic Pictures
- Release date: April 8, 1951
- Running time: 67 minutes
- Country: United States
- Language: English

Thunder in God's Country is a 1951 American Western film directed by George Blair, written by Arthur E. Orloff and starring Rex Allen, Mary Ellen Kay, Buddy Ebsen, Ian MacDonald, Paul Harvey and Harry Lauter. It was released on April 8, 1951 by Republic Pictures.

== Cast ==
- Rex Allen as Rex Allen
- Mary Ellen Kay as Dell Stafford
- Buddy Ebsen as Happy Hooper
- Ian MacDonald as Smitty
- Paul Harvey as Carson Masterson
- Harry Lauter as Marshal Tim Gallery
- John Doucette as Henchman Breedon
- Harry Cheshire as Mayor Larkin
- John Ridgely as Bill Stafford
- Frank Ferguson as Tape Recorder Man
- Wilson Wood as Johnson
