= Arthur E. Orloff =

American screenwriter

- Born: November 25, 1908; Brooklyn, New York, United States
- Died: September 16, 1994 (aged 85); Beverly Hills, California, United States
- Occupation: Writer
- Years active: 1946 - 1963 (film & TV)

Arthur E. Orloff (1908–1994) was an American screenwriter.

== Selected filmography ==
- Alias Mr. Twilight (1946)
- Wild Country (1947)
- The Lone Wolf in London (1947)
- Cheyenne Takes Over (1947)
- Code of the Silver Sage (1950)
- Beauty on Parade (1950)
- Thunder in God's Country (1951)
- Buckaroo Sheriff of Texas (1951)
- Desperadoes' Outpost (1952)
- Red River Shore (1953)

== Bibliography ==
- Pitts, Michael R. Western Movies: A Guide to 5,105 Feature Films. McFarland, 2012.
