= Blues Brothers 2000 (soundtrack) =

Blues Brothers 2000: Original Motion Picture Soundtrack

Soundtrack album by various artists
- Released: February 3, 1998
- Recorded: 1997
- Length: 60:29
- Label: Uptown/Universal
- Producer: Paul Shaffer

Various artists chronology
Blues Brothers & Friends: Live from House of Blues (1997)	Blues Brothers 2000: Original Motion Picture Soundtrack (1998)	The Blues Brothers Complete (2000)

Professional ratings
Review scores
Source	Rating
AllMusic	link

Blues Brothers 2000: Original Motion Picture Soundtrack is a soundtrack album that features the Blues Brothers. It is a soundtrack album to the 1998 film, Blues Brothers 2000, the sequel to the 1980 film, The Blues Brothers.

In addition to tracks by the Blues Brothers Band performed with guest artists such as Aretha Franklin, James Brown, Dr. John, Lonnie Brooks, Junior Wells, Eddie Floyd and Wilson Pickett, there are songs by the Paul Butterfield Blues Band and Blues Traveler as well as an all-star blues supergroup, the Louisiana Gator Boys, featuring B.B. King, Eric Clapton, Bo Diddley, Charlie Musselwhite, Travis Tritt, Doctor John, Lou Rawls, Koko Taylor, Isaac Hayes, Billy Preston and other artists.

This is the first official Blues Brothers release to feature John Goodman, although his first performance as a member of the group occurred at the House of Blues in Los Angeles in 1995.

== Track listing ==
No.	Title	Writer(s)	Artist	Length
1.	"Born in Chicago"	Nick Gravenites	Paul Butterfield Blues Band	3:05
2.	"The Blues Don't Bother Me"	Murphy	Matt "Guitar" Murphy	3:32
3.	"Harmonica Musings"	Popper	John Popper	0:32
4.	"Cheaper to Keep Her"	Mack Rice	Elwood Blues, Lonnie Brooks and Junior Wells	3:13
5.	"Perry Mason Theme"	Fred Steiner	Blues Brothers	2:29
6.	"Looking for a Fox"	Clarence Carter/Marcus Daniel/Rick Hall/Wilbur Terrell	Blues Brothers	2:46
7.	"I Can't Turn You Loose"	Otis Redding	Blues Brothers	2:24
8.	"Respect"	Redding	Aretha Franklin and the Ridgeway Sisters	3:00
9.	"634-5789 (Soulsville, U.S.A.)"	Steve Cropper/Eddie Floyd	Eddie Floyd, Wilson Pickett, Jonny Lang and the Blues Brothers	3:29
10.	"Maybe I'm Wrong"	Popper	Blues Traveler	5:33
11.	"Riders in the Sky: A Cowboy Legend"	Stan Jones	Blues Brothers	3:10
12.	"John the Revelator"	Son House	James Brown, Sam Moore and Cab Blues	3:53
13.	"Let There Be Drums"	Sandy Nelson/Richard Podolor	Carl LaFong Trio	1:14
14.	"Season of the Witch"	Donovan Leitch	Dr. John and The Blues Brothers	5:09
15.	"Funky Nassau"	Tyrone Fitzgerald/Raphael Munnings	Queen Mousette, Cab Blues, Elwood Blues, Mighty Mack and The Blues Brothers	4:11
16.	"How Blue Can You Get?"	Jane Feather	The Louisiana Gator Boys	5:18
17.	"Turn On Your Love Light"	Deadric Malone/Joe Scott	Blues Brothers	3:30
18.	"New Orleans"	Frank Guida/Joseph Royster	The Louisiana Gator Boys and the Blues Brothers	4:01

== Other songs in the film ==
In addition to the soundtrack, there are songs that appear in the film as background music that do not feature on the soundtrack. They include:

- "Last Night" by the Blues Brothers Band - plays when Elwood and Buster drive through the city to Willie's Strip Club
- "Gumpstumper" by Ben Vaughan - plays during the car chase scene between Elwood, Mack & Buster and the Russian gangsters, after Willie's Strip Club is burnt down
- "Honkytonk Dancing Machine" by Tracy Byrd - plays in the background of the scene at Bob's Country Kitchen
- "Please Please Please" by James Brown and Blues Brothers - plays as the lady is leaving at the end of the movie
- "Checkin' Up on My Baby" by Junior Wells and Lonnie Brooks - from a scene in Willie's Strip Club that was recorded for the film but only included during the end credits. This is one of Wells' final performances before he died in early 1998.

== Credits ==
- "Mighty" Mack McTeer (John Goodman) - vocals
- Buster Blues (J. Evan Bonifant) - vocals
- Cab Blues (Joe Morton) - vocals
- Elwood J. Blues (Dan Aykroyd) - vocals, blues harp
- Steve "the Colonel" Cropper - guitar
- Matt "Guitar" Murphy - lead guitar
- Donald "Duck" Dunn - bass
- "Blue" Lou Marini - alt, tenor and baritone saxophone
- Alan "Mr. Fabulous" Rubin - trumpet
- Tom "Bones" Malone - trombone, alto, tenor and baritone saxophone
- Birch "Crimson Slide" Johnson - trombone
- Paul "The Shiv" Shaffer - keyboards, producer
- Leon "The Lion" Pendarvis - keyboards
- Murphy "Murph" Dunne - keyboards
- Anton Fig - drums
- Steve Potts - drums
- Willie "Too Big" Hall - drums
- John Popper - harmonica

== Charts ==
=== Weekly charts ===
Chart (1998)	Peak position
Hungarian Albums (MAHASZ)	16

== Certifications ==
Region	Certification	Certified units/sales
Canada (Music Canada)	Gold	50,000^{^}
Switzerland (IFPI Switzerland)	Gold	25,000^{^}
United States (RIAA)	Gold	500,000^{^}
^{^} Shipments figures based on certification alone.
