= Tony Thomas (film historian) =

British-American film historian, author

Tony Thomas (July 31, 1927 – July 8, 1997) was a British-American film historian, author, writer, producer, and radio and television broadcaster. Considered one of Hollywood's preeminent film historians, he authored over thirty books, produced more than fifty albums of film music, and produced film documentaries for radio and television. Among his works are biographies of Errol Flynn, Burt Lancaster, Joel McCrea, Gregory Peck, and Dick Powell, and entries in Citadel Press's Films of series, including chronicles of the careers of Marlon Brando, Henry Fonda, Olivia de Havilland, Gene Kelly, Ronald Reagan, and James Stewart.

== Biography ==
Anthony William George Thomas was born on July 31, 1927, near Portsmouth, England, the son of a bandmaster in the Royal Marines. At the age of eighteen, he moved to Canada, where he became an announcer for the Canadian Broadcasting Corporation in 1948. He went on to become a writer and producer of programs about Hollywood and the film industry for CBC Radio. He was also the writer and host of the CBS television series As Time Goes By and was a panelist on the quiz show television series Flashback.

In 1966, Thomas moved to Los Angeles and began a new career as a film historian and author, being particularly active from the late 1960s to early 1990s. In 1972, Thomas was one of the founders of The Film Music Society and served on its advisory board for many years. Considered an expert on film music, he produced albums of classic film scores and wrote the well-received book Music for the Movies (1973), an introduction to important film composers. From 1979 to 1984, he wrote for the Academy Awards shows, and beginning in the late 1970s, was a segment producer for the Oscars. As an independent film writer and producer, he produced three PBS documentaries: Hollywood and the American Image, Back to the Stage Door Canteen, and The West That Never Was. His distinguished voice was heard for years as the announcer on the televised Kennedy Center Honors and American Film Institute Salutes.

Thomas died on July 8, 1997, at Providence Saint Joseph Medical Center in Burbank, California, of complications from pneumonia, at the age of 69. He was survived by his son, David, his daughter, Andrea, and his companion, Lorna Grenadier. He is considered one of Hollywood's preeminent film historians.

== Bibliography ==
- The Films of Errol Flynn (1969), with Rudy Behlmer and Clifford McCarty
- Ustinov in Focus (1971)
- The Films of Kirk Douglas (1972)
- Cads and Cavaliers: The Gentlemen Adventurers of the Movies (1973)
- Music for the Movies (1973)
- The Busby Berkeley Book (1973)
- The Films of Marlon Brando (1973)
- The Films of Gene Kelly (1974)
- The Hollywood Professionals, Volume 2 (1974), chapter on Sam Wood
- The Films of the Forties (1975)
- Hollywood's Hollywood: The Movies About the Movies (1975), with Rudy Behlmer
- Harry Warren and the Hollywood Musical (1975)
- Burt Lancaster (1975)
- The Great Adventure Films (1976)
- Gregory Peck (1977)
- Film Score: The View from the Podium (1979)
- Film Score: The Art and Craft of Movie Music (1979)
- The Films of 20th Century-Fox: A Pictorial History (1979)
- The Films of Ronald Reagan (1980)
- From a Life of Adventure: The Writings of Errol Flynn (1980)
- Hollywood and the American Image (1981)
- The Films of Olivia de Havilland (1983)
- That's Dancing! (1984)
- Howard Hughes in Hollywood (1985)
- The Films of 20th Century-Fox: A Pictorial History (1985)
- Ronald Reagan: The Hollywood Years (1986)
- George Gershwin Remembered (1987)
- A Wonderful Life: The Films and Career of James Stewart (1988)
- The Cinema of the Sea: A Critical Survey and Filmography, 1925–1986 (1988)
- The West that Never Was (1989)
- Errol Flynn: The Spy Who Never Was (1990)
- The Films of Henry Fonda (1990)
- The Best of Universal (1990)
- Joel McCrea: Riding the High Country (1991)
- The Dick Powell Story (1992)
