= The Case of the Restless Redhead =

- Perry Mason episode
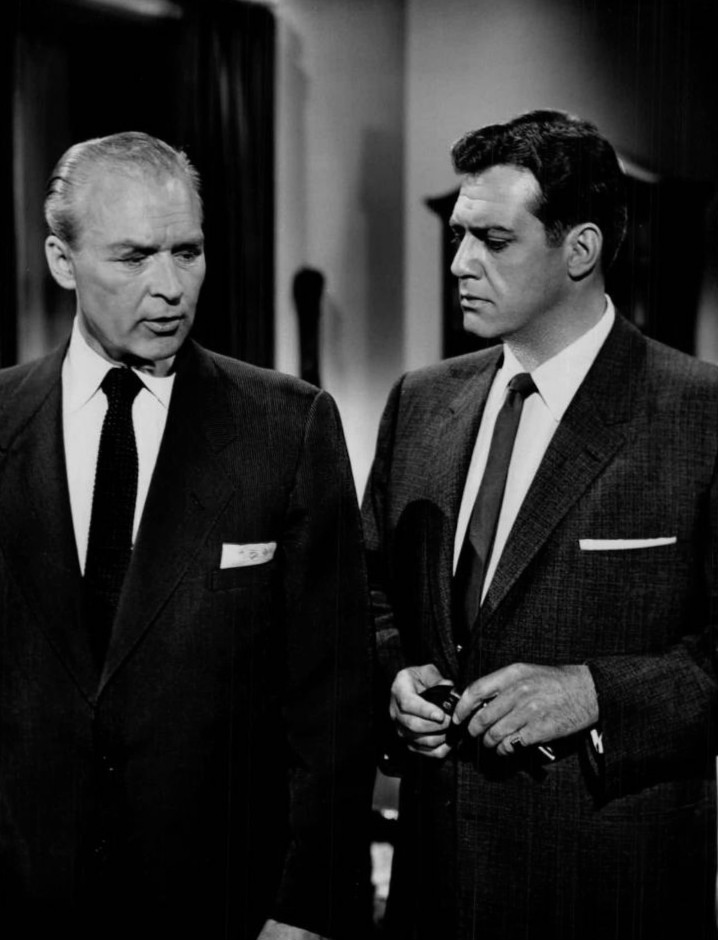
- Ralph Clanton and Raymond Burr in "The Case of the Restless Redhead"
- Episode no.: Season 1 Episode 1
- Directed by: William D. Russell
- Teleplay by: Russell S. Hughes
- Based on: The Case of the Restless Redhead by Erle Stanley Gardner
- Editing by: Richard W. Farrell
- Original air date: September 21, 1957
- Running time: 50 min

Guest appearances
- Whitney Blake as Evelyn Bagby; Jane Buchanan as Mrs. Boles; Ralph Clanton as Mervyn Aldritch; Gloria Henry as Helene Chaney; Norman Leavitt as Mr. Redfield; Helen Mayon as Mary Thompson; Grandon Rhodes as Judge Kippen; Dick Rich as Sgt. Holcomb; Vaughn Taylor as Mr. Boles

Episode chronology
| ← Previous — | Next → "The Case of the Sleepwalker's Niece" |

"The Case of the Restless Redhead" is the premiere episode of the CBS television series Perry Mason. Adapted from the 1954 novel of the same title by Erle Stanley Gardner, this episode marked the beginning of Raymond Burr's long-running portrayal of the famous fictional lawyer.

== Synopsis ==
Red-headed waitress Evelyn Bagby (Whitney Blake) comes home to her apartment one night and is shocked to find a revolver, which she'd never seen before, in her cigarette box. Having once been accused, then acquitted, of stealing jewelry from a famous movie star, Evelyn calls defense attorney Perry Mason (Raymond Burr) to ask for his advice. He advises her to leave her San Fernando Valley apartment and check into a hotel in Hollywood for the night. As she drives to Hollywood, a driver with a hood over his head tries to force her off the road; panicking, she fires the revolver twice in his direction, causing him to drive off the road.

Evelyn brings the gun to Mason's office and tells him what had happened. Mason goes to the scene of the incident, and finds that the homicide police are already there; the hooded driver was killed by a bullet to the head. He's identified as a man who had cheated Evelyn out of $1500 when she first came to Hollywood, and there's no bullet hole in the man's hood—which turns out to be a pillowcase from the apartment house where Evelyn lives. The police refuse to believe her story, and she's arrested for murder.

After a great many twists and turns (including Mason using an identical gun to fire two bullets into a tree and a post at the crash site), Mason, with help from private investigator Paul Drake (William Hopper), exposes the true killer in the courtroom; as a result, Evelyn is cleared of all charges.

== Notes ==
- Sergeant Holcomb, who was a regular character in the original Perry Mason novels, only appears in two episodes of the TV series; this one, and "The Case of the Fan Dancer's Horse" (in which he's played by Rusty Wescoatt). In most of the episodes, this character's role is filled by that of Lieutenant Arthur Tragg (Ray Collins) and/or Lieutenant Andy Anderson (Wesley Lau).
- Whitney Blake, who plays the "restless redhead" in this episode, later plays wrongfully accused Diana Reynolds in the episode "The Case of the Black-Eyed Blonde".
- Although this was the first episode broadcast, it was not the pilot episode for the series; that episode, "The Case of the Moth-Eaten Mink", was broadcast twelve weeks later.
