= Perry Mason (1957 TV series) =

American legal drama series (1957–1966)

- Title screen
- Genre: Legal drama Mystery fiction
- Based on: Characters by Erle Stanley Gardner
- Developed by: Paisano Productions
- Starring: Raymond Burr; Barbara Hale; William Hopper; William Talman; Ray Collins; Wesley Lau; Richard Anderson
- Theme music composer: Fred Steiner
- Opening theme: "Park Avenue Beat"
- Country of origin: United States
- Original language: English
- No. of seasons: 9
- No. of episodes: 271 (list of episodes)

Production
- Executive producer: Gail Patrick Jackson
- Producers: Ben Brady; Herbert Hirschman; Seeleg Lester; Arthur Marks; Art Seid
- Camera setup: Single-camera
- Running time: 52 minutes
- Production companies: CBS Television; Paisano Productions; TCF Television Productions, Inc.

Original release
- Network: CBS
- Release: September 21, 1957 – May 22, 1966

Related
- The New Perry Mason; Perry Mason television films

Perry Mason is an American legal drama series aired on CBS from September 21, 1957, to May 22, 1966. The title character, played by Raymond Burr, is a Los Angeles criminal defense lawyer who originally appeared in detective fiction by Erle Stanley Gardner. Many episodes were based on stories written by Gardner.

Perry Mason was one of Hollywood's first weekly one-hour series filmed for television, and remains one of the longest-running and most successful legal-themed television series. During its first season, it received a Primetime Emmy Award nomination for Outstanding Dramatic Series and it became one of the five most popular shows on television. Burr received two Emmy Awards for Outstanding Lead Actor in a Drama Series, and Barbara Hale received an Emmy Award for Outstanding Supporting Actress in a Drama Series for her portrayal of Mason's confidential secretary Della Street. Perry Mason and Burr were honored as Favorite Series and Favorite Male Performer in the first two TV Guide Award readers' polls. In 1960, the series received the first Silver Gavel Award presented for television drama by the American Bar Association.

Perry Mason has aired in syndication in the United States and internationally ever since its cancellation, and the complete series has been released on Region 1 DVD. A 2014 study found that Netflix users rate Raymond Burr as their favorite actor, with Barbara Hale number seven on the list.

The New Perry Mason, a 1973 revival of the series with a different cast, was poorly received and ran for 15 episodes. In 1985, Burr returned to play Mason in a successful series of Perry Mason television films airing on NBC. A total of 30 films were made; Burr starred in 26 of them before his death in 1993. Another series, also titled Perry Mason, focusing on Perry Mason's origin story began airing in 2020 on HBO, with Matthew Rhys in the title role.

== Plot ==
Perry Mason is a distinguished criminal-defense lawyer practicing in Los Angeles, California, most of whose clients have been wrongly charged with murder. He is ably assisted by his confidential secretary Della Street and by private investigator Paul Drake. The innocent suspect is usually prosecuted by district attorney Hamilton Burger, though the prosecution is handled by a local district attorney when the murder takes place outside Los Angeles County. In the early seasons, the police investigation is usually led by the homicide detective Lt. Arthur Tragg. (Later, other homicide detectives appear with increasing frequency.)

In a typical episode, the first half of the show introduces a client, who often hires Mason on non-murder related business, or becomes acquainted with him in some other way. The prospective murder victim and other important figures in the case are introduced, and then the client is wrongly accused. Once the crime has been committed, while Tragg and Burger work to gather evidence against Mason's innocent client, Mason, Paul Drake and Della Street engage in a parallel investigation in order to exonerate him or her.

In the second half, Mason and Burger spar in the courtroom. This usually takes place during the preliminary hearing because Mason's technique is to clear a client before they are bound over for trial (based on novels). Jury trials are rarely seen, with "The Case of the Terrified Typist" being an exception. (Note: This spared the production company the expense of hiring 12 extras to play jurors. It also compressed the time element, since a preliminary examination usually takes place within weeks of an arraignment, while a full-blown murder trial might take a year to get to court.) As the courtroom proceedings advance, while Burger and Tragg often uncover new evidence or a new witness that would seem to seal the fate of the accused, Mason's team continue their parallel investigation in what seems to be an increasingly hopeless effort. As the investigation or examination progresses, Mason and sometimes Burger uncover the morally ugly or even illegal conduct of some of the witnesses or participants, thus complicating the moral and legal intrigue of the case.

Eventually, some detail is uncovered, a different interpretation of the evidence is found, or a remark is made inside or outside the courtroom which gives Mason the clue he needs to discover the identity of the real murderer. (For example, in "The Case of the Lazy Lover", the prosecution's case relies on a complicated set of footprints left at the crime scene. Mason notices that the prints left by a neighbor's dog were inconsistent with Burger's interpretation, leading Mason to realize that the neighbor's testimony was contrary to the truth.) Armed with this new insight, Mason then usually embarks upon a line of questioning that reveals the surprise perpetrator, often causing them to break down and confess to the crime in the courtroom. (Note: "It is never enough for Mason to establish a reasonable doubt of his client's guilt; he must clear the client absolutely by pinning the guilt on someone else, almost always by extracting a confession," wrote film scholar Thomas Leitch.) In the closing scene or epilogue, Paul and Della, and sometimes Burger and Tragg, ask Mason what gave him the clue he needed; after Mason explains, he or someone else makes a humorous remark.

== Cast and characters ==
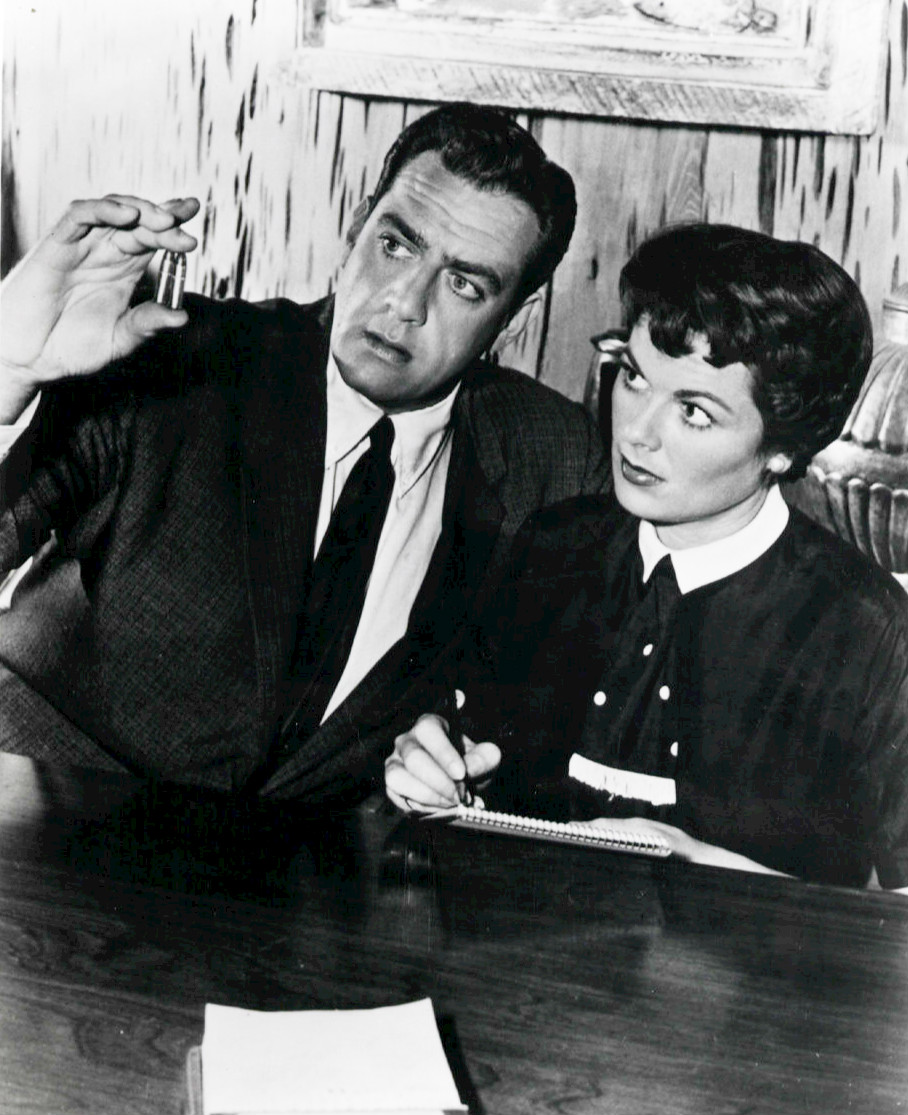
Perry Mason (Raymond Burr) and Della Street (Barbara Hale) in "The Case of the Corresponding Corpse" (1958)

- Perry Mason – played by Raymond Burr – defense attorney.
- Della Street – played by Barbara Hale – Mason's confidential legal secretary.
- Paul Drake – played by William Hopper – owner of the Paul Drake Detective Agency, which employs a number of operatives, and is located in the same building as Perry's law practice. Often, Drake and his operatives do the legwork that allows Perry to assemble the clues that will clear his client.
- Hamilton Burger – played by William Talman – district attorney. Absent for parts of seasons 3 and 4. (Talman was briefly suspended from the show for violating CBS's morals clause, (Note: Hal Ericson writes in the book Encyclopedia of Television Law Shows: Factual and Fictional Series About Judges, Lawyers and the Courtroom, 1948–2008, "Though the charges were later dropped, CBS invoked the morals clause in Talman's contract, suspending him from Perry Mason on the grounds the viewers would reject the presence of a 'tainted' performer.") but was reinstated at the request of executive producer Gail Patrick Jackson and star Raymond Burr, after a letter-writing campaign from viewers.)
- LAPD homicide detectives:
  - Lieutenant Arthur Tragg – played by Ray Collins – a police homicide detective and lead police official on the series. He appeared in all but a handful of episodes in seasons 1–3. Illness forced him to appear in fewer and fewer episodes in later seasons: nineteen episodes in season 4, eleven episodes in season 5, nine episodes in season 6, and three episodes in season 7. Collins continued to be billed in every episode through the end of season 8, though he ceased to appear midway through season 7. His last episode was "The Case of the Capering Camera" (season 7, episode 15; first broadcast January 16, 1964).
  - Lieutenant Anderson – played by Wesley Lau – police homicide detective and lead police official on the series, known as Andy to his friends. Lau started appearing in the fall of 1961, when Ray Collins began to reduce his participation in the show due to illness, and gradually became more prominent. Some episodes featured Tragg, some Anderson, and some both, with Anderson's appearances generally increasing in proportion to Tragg's appearances being shorter or less often. Lau had previously appeared as another character in "The Case of the Impatient Partner" (season 5, episode 2; first broadcast September 16, 1961). Lt. Anderson was seen in seasons 5–8, beginning with "The Case of the Malicious Mariner" (season 5, episode 4; first broadcast on October 7, 1961) and ending with "The Case of the Mischievous Doll" (season 8, episode 30; first broadcast May 13, 1965).
  - Lieutenant Steve Drumm – played by Richard Anderson, replacing Wesley Lau – police homicide detective and lead police official on the series, who appeared in the final season. Anderson had appeared previously as other lead characters in "The Case of the Accosted Accountant" (season 7, episode 14; first broadcast on January 9, 1964) and "The Case of the Paper Bullets" (season 8, episode 2; first broadcast October 1, 1964).

Recurring smaller roles

- Dr. Hoxie – autopsy surgeon (medical examiner) played by Michael Fox, seen in seasons 1 through 7; Fox also played other small roles in season 9.
- Police Sgt. Ben Landro - a homicide lead detective, played by Mort Mills. Sgt. Landro represents the law whenever the crime scene is remote from the city, and out of Lt. Tragg's jurisdiction. Seen infrequently (and never seen in an episode with Tragg, Anderson, or Drumm), Landro appeared in seven episodes during seasons 4, 5, 6, and 8.
- Sgt. Brice – a police officer, played by Lee Miller, who often accompanies Tragg, Anderson, or Drumm (but never Landro). Seen throughout the series run. Miller (who was Raymond Burr's on-set stand-in) also played other bit roles in seasons 1 and 2.
- Terrance Clay – played by Dan Tobin. Owner of the upscale Clay's Grill, where Perry, Paul, and Della (and sometimes Burger and/or Drumm) frequently gather in the final (ninth) season, usually during the story's epilogue. Perry, Paul, and Della (and sometimes Burger and Tragg) also frequented Clay's Grill in season 1 — but Clay was never seen in these early episodes.
- Gertrude "Gertie" Lade – Mason's frequently mentioned but rarely seen receptionist, played by Connie Cezon. Capable and friendly, if slightly ditzy, Gertie was seen mostly in seasons 1 and 2, with one appearance in season 4, and three episodes in season 7 (with Connie Cezon substituting for the temporarily unavailable Barbara Hale).
- Jonathan Hale – the rural district attorney, played by Paul Fix in five episodes. Whenever the crime scene is in a rustic county far from Hamilton Burger's jurisdiction, prosecutor Hale shrewdly—but quietly and good-naturedly—spars with defense counsel Mason.
- David Gideon – an eager young law student (and initially, a client of Mason's) who occasionally assisted Perry in researching a case. Played by Karl Held in seasons 4 and 5.
- Court clerk – Seen in the background during courtroom procedures. He handled exhibits marked for identification, and he called witnesses to the stand and swore them in. During the first two seasons the clerk was played alternately by Jack Harris and Jack Gargan. Midway through season 2 George E. Stone took over the clerk's role and remained with the series through season 6; Stone alternated with actors Charles Stroud, Olan Soule, and Hans Moebus.
- Judges – A rotating pool of judges was seen. The judges were not always consistently named, and were usually not given a name at all, only being referred to as "Your Honor." Each actor maintained a consistent personality during his sessions on the bench. Often seen were S. John Launer (33 episodes, 1958–1966), Kenneth MacDonald (32 episodes, 1957–1966), Willis Bouchey (23 episodes, 1960–1966), Morris Ankrum (22 episodes, 1957–1964), John Gallaudet (20 episodes, 1959–1966; his character was identified in later years as Judge Ben Penner), Grandon Rhodes (16 episodes, 1957–1966), Richard Gaines (14 episodes, 1958–1961), Charles Irving (11 episodes, 1961–1965), Nelson Leigh (9 episodes, 1959–1964), and Frank Wilcox (8 episodes, 1957–1960). For three cases the judge was a woman: Lillian Bronson (1958–1960). One notable judge was played by Vince Townsend Jr., who appeared in "The Case of the Skeleton's Closet" (season 6, episode 26; first broadcast on May 2, 1963); Townsend was an African-American who spoke no lines. He was an actual judge in the Los Angeles County Municipal Court and was also a minister in the First African Methodist Episcopal Church of Los Angeles. He was the only black judge to appear in the series.

== Production ==
=== Background ===
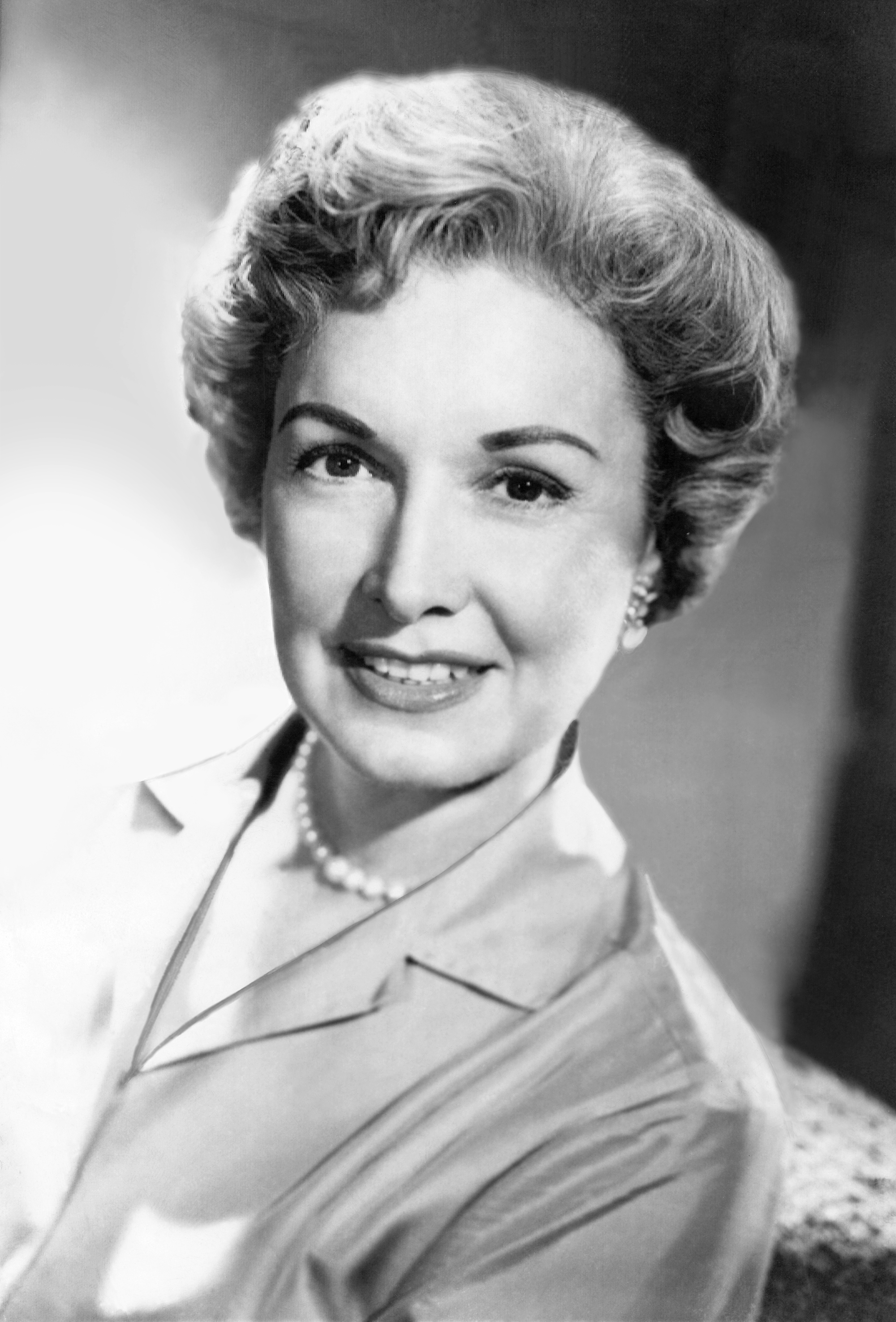
Gail Patrick Jackson, executive producer of Perry Mason (1961)

Erle Stanley Gardner had already allowed his Perry Mason character to be portrayed in other media. A series of Warner Bros. feature films was produced between 1933 and 1937, starring Warren William in four and Ricardo Cortez and Donald Woods in one each. A seventh Warner adaptation, based on Gardner's novel The Case of the Dangerous Dowager, was filmed in 1940 as Granny Get Your Gun, with the Mason character written out of the story entirely.

A radio series followed, which Gardner despised because it emphasized romance over legal matters. The radio series, without the Mason character, would be adapted for television as the long-running crime soap opera The Edge of Night. After the film and radio ventures, Gardner refused to license his popular character Perry Mason for any more adaptations.

His literary agent was advertising executive Thomas Cornwell Jackson, who had married actress Gail Patrick in 1947. She had studied law before she went to Hollywood "for a lark" and appeared in more than 60 feature films including My Man Godfrey (1936), Stage Door (1937), and My Favorite Wife (1940). She stopped acting in 1948, started a family, and began to talk to Gardner about adapting the Perry Mason stories for a television series.

"We kept talking about what kind of a series he'd want and how much creative control he needed," Gail Patrick told journalist James Bawden in 1979. "I just think he came to trust me and I'd kept up my contacts in show business."

Gardner regarded Perry Mason's personal life as irrelevant and wanted the series to concentrate on crime and Mason's fight for the underdog. "You must remember," Patrick said, "Erle was in love with the law and its finer points."

Patrick, her husband, and Gardner formed a production company, Paisano Productions, of which she was president. When she first tried to sell Perry Mason to CBS, the network wanted it to be a live hour-long weekly program. "That would have been impossible—it would have killed the actor playing Perry," Patrick said. "And I Love Lucy had taught the value of filmed reruns." Paisano Productions absorbed the costs for a filmed pilot.

In February 1956, CBS announced its new series, Perry Mason, anticipating it would begin that fall. The network obtained the rights to 272 stories by Gardner, including Perry Mason and 11 other principal characters. The rights were purchased from Paisano Productions, which would film the series in association with CBS and own a 60% interest in the films.

Perry Mason was one of Hollywood's first hour-long weekly series filmed for television. Gail Patrick Jackson was its executive producer. "We were the first bona fide law show and we spent two years preparing Perry for the television bar," Patrick said.

=== Casting ===
Gail Patrick Jackson was immersed in auditions throughout 1956. Columnist Hedda Hopper wrote that Cornwell Jackson had postponed a two-month vacation in Hawaii, hoping to get the series ready by September or October. In mid-June, Hopper reported that the Jacksons had left on their annual trip, after stating that Perry Mason would not be ready for TV that fall.

The role of Perry Mason proved the hardest to cast. Richard Carlson, Mike Connors, Richard Egan, and William Holden were considered; Connors and Egan went on to make guest appearances in the series. In early April, Fred MacMurray and CBS were reportedly in the midst of negotiations. Patrick saw hundreds of actors audition in April 1956. "We couldn't afford a big star," Patrick later said. At last, Efrem Zimbalist Jr., already a star at Warner Bros., was signed without a screen test.

Raymond Burr initially read for the role of district attorney Hamilton Burger, with Tod Andrews standing in as Mason. Burr was more interested in the Perry Mason role and told associate producer Sam White, "If you don't like me as Perry Mason, then I'll go along and play the part of the district attorney, Hamilton Burger." Patrick had been impressed with Burr's courtroom performance in the 1951 film A Place in the Sun, and told him he was perfect for the title role in Perry Mason, but at least 60 pounds overweight. Over the next month, Burr went on a crash diet. When he returned, he tested as Perry Mason. (Note: Burr's talent test as Perry Mason is dated May 24, 1956.) Burr's tryout performance as Mason was a triumph, according to White: "He was so great that everybody looked at each other and said, 'What do we do now? This guy is far superior. He'll give this thing a dimension that Zimbalist could never give it.'" By July 1956, word was out that Burr had the role, and an announcement was made at the beginning of August.

William Hopper also auditioned as Mason, (Note: Hopper's audition as Perry Mason, along with Burr's auditions for Burger and Mason, were included as special features on disc four of the 2008 "50th Anniversary Edition" Perry Mason DVD set.) but was cast as private detective Paul Drake. Patrick recalled, "When Bill Hopper came in to read for Paul Drake he blurted out, 'You hate my mother.' And that was Hedda Hopper. Well, I disliked what she stood for, but 'hate' is something else—and anyway he was perfect as Drake, and we got him."

Barbara Hale was still prominent in feature films, but had a young family and wished to avoid going away on long periods of location shooting. Patrick said that Hale telephoned about the role of Della Street.

Patrick had an actor in mind for the Los Angeles district attorney. "I'd seen a brilliant little movie, The Hitch-Hiker, and had to have William Talman as Burger—and he never disappointed us," Patrick said. Later asked about how he felt about Burger losing to Mason week after week, Talman said, "Burger doesn't lose. How can a district attorney lose when he fails to convict an innocent person? Unlike a fist or gun fight, in court you can have a winner without having a loser. As a matter of fact, Burger in a good many instances has joined Mason in action against unethical attorneys, lying witnesses, or any one else obstructing justice. Like any real-life district attorney, justice is Burger's main interest."

"Ray Collins came on board as Lt. Arthur Tragg," Patrick said. "He was such a wonderful actor—beautiful voice, trained in radio's Mercury Theatre. We overlooked the fact that on an actual police force, he would probably be long retired." Collins was 68 at the time the series debuted. Gardner had always presented Lt. Tragg in his novels as being about the same age as Mason, and Gardner was apprehensive about casting a much older actor as Tragg. Director Christian Nyby recalled, "When he [Gardner] saw the first couple of pictures, he said, 'You're right. He's perfect for the role.'" Gardner was so impressed by Collins that he actually changed the character in the novels to reflect the Collins interpretation. Lt. Tragg was now being described as "grandfatherly" and "paternal."

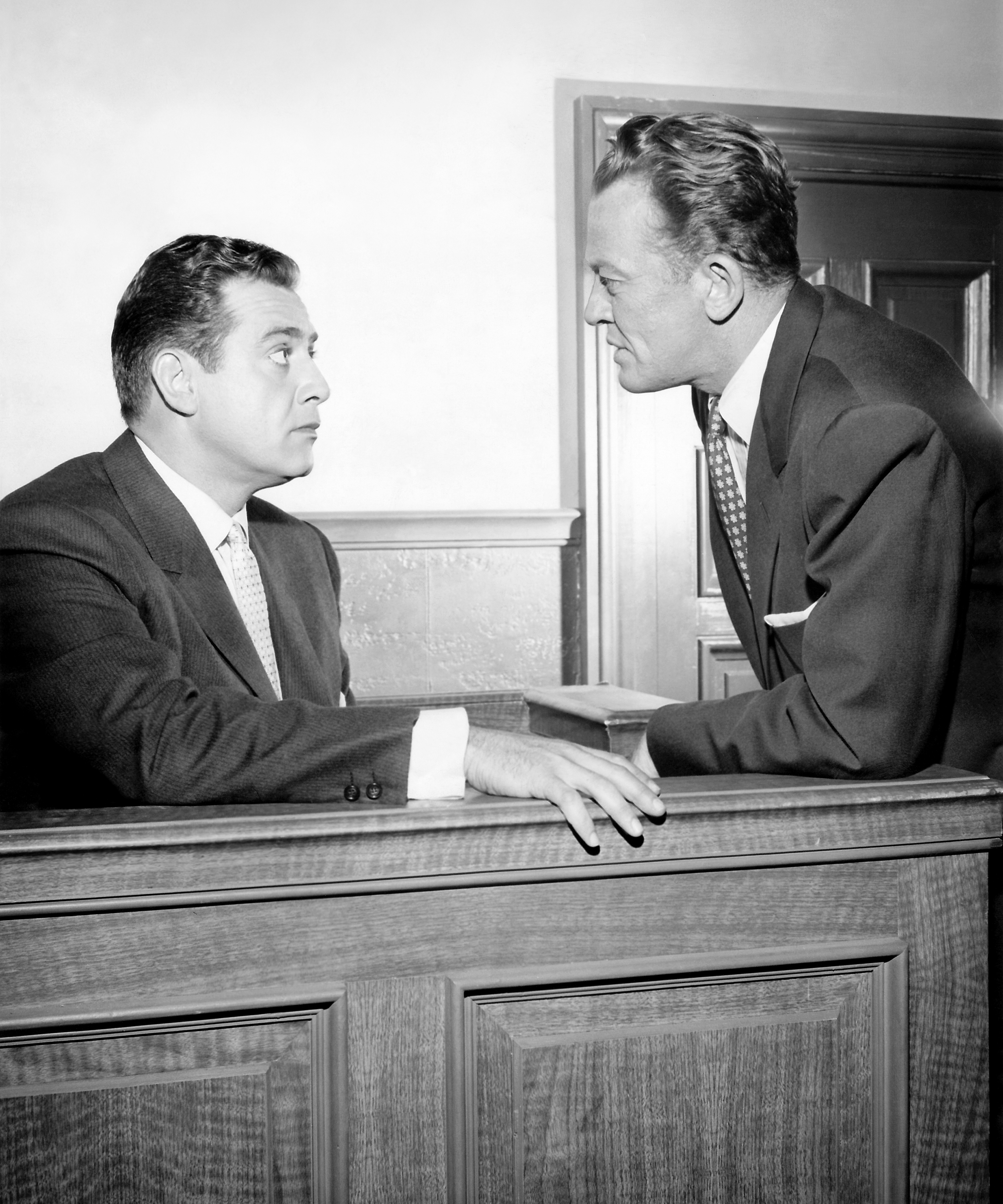
Perry Mason (Raymond Burr) and Hamilton Burger (William Talman)

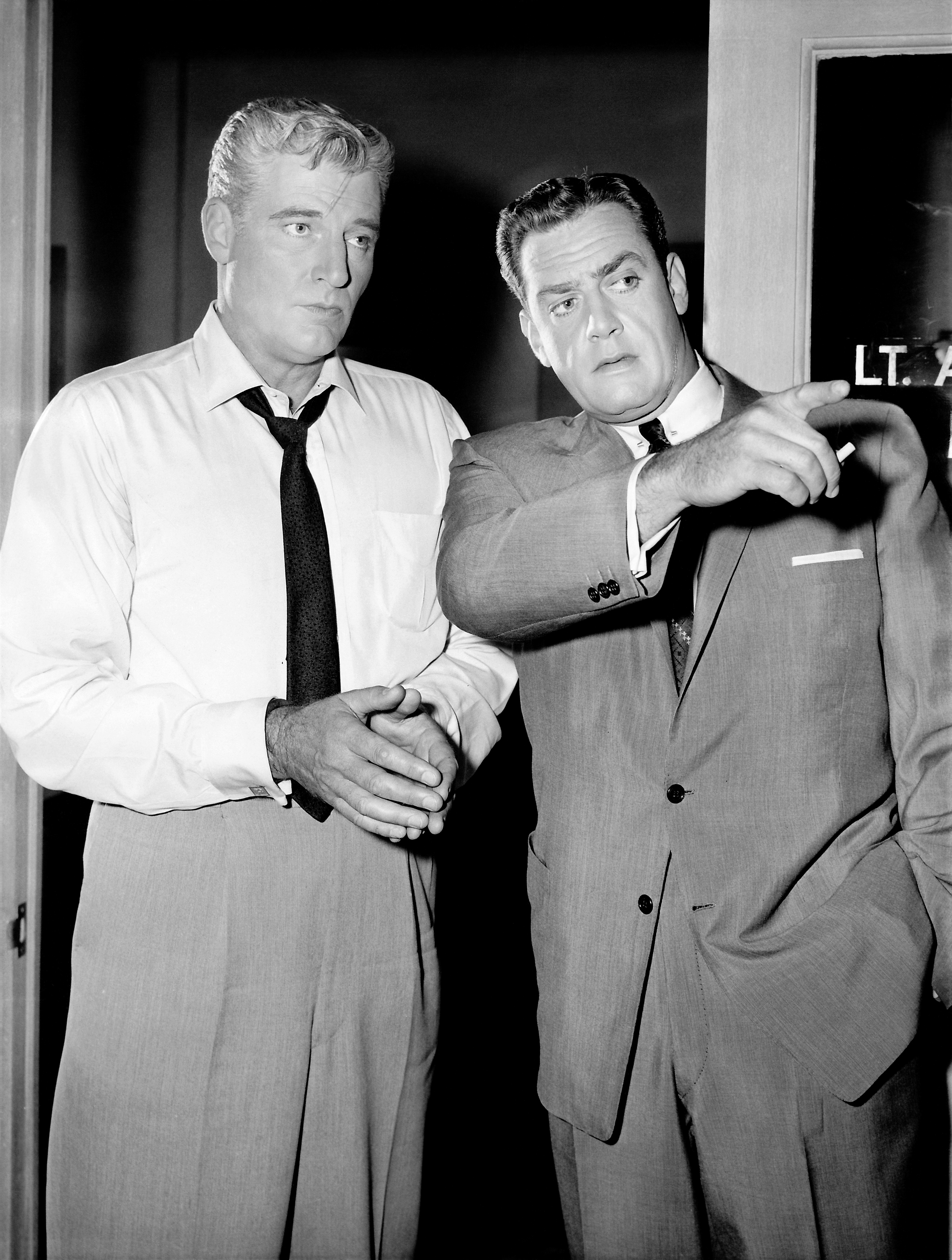
Paul Drake (William Hopper) and Perry Mason (Raymond Burr)

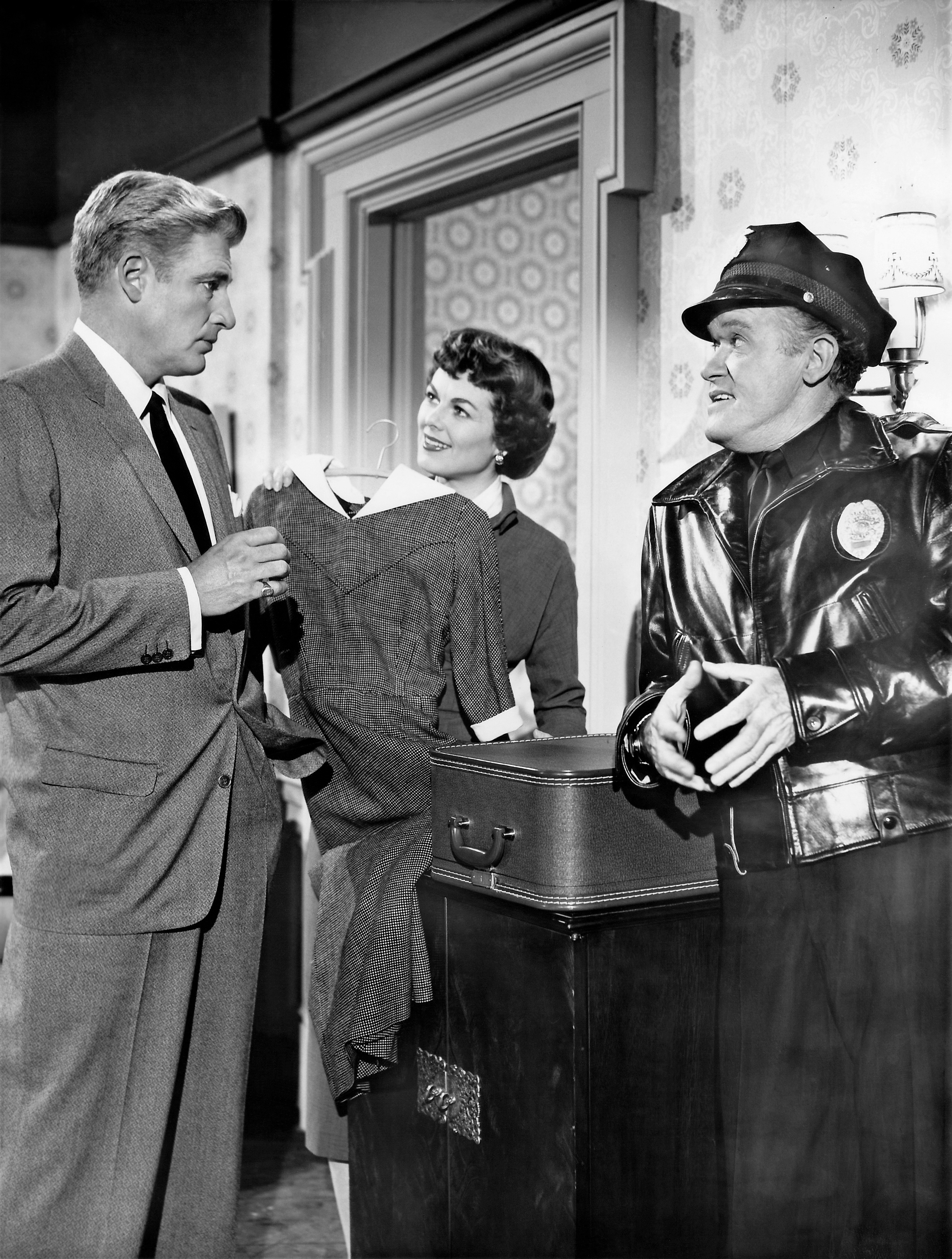
Paul Drake (William Hopper) and Della Street (Barbara Hale), with cop Frank Sully in "The Case of the Black-Eyed Blonde" (1958)

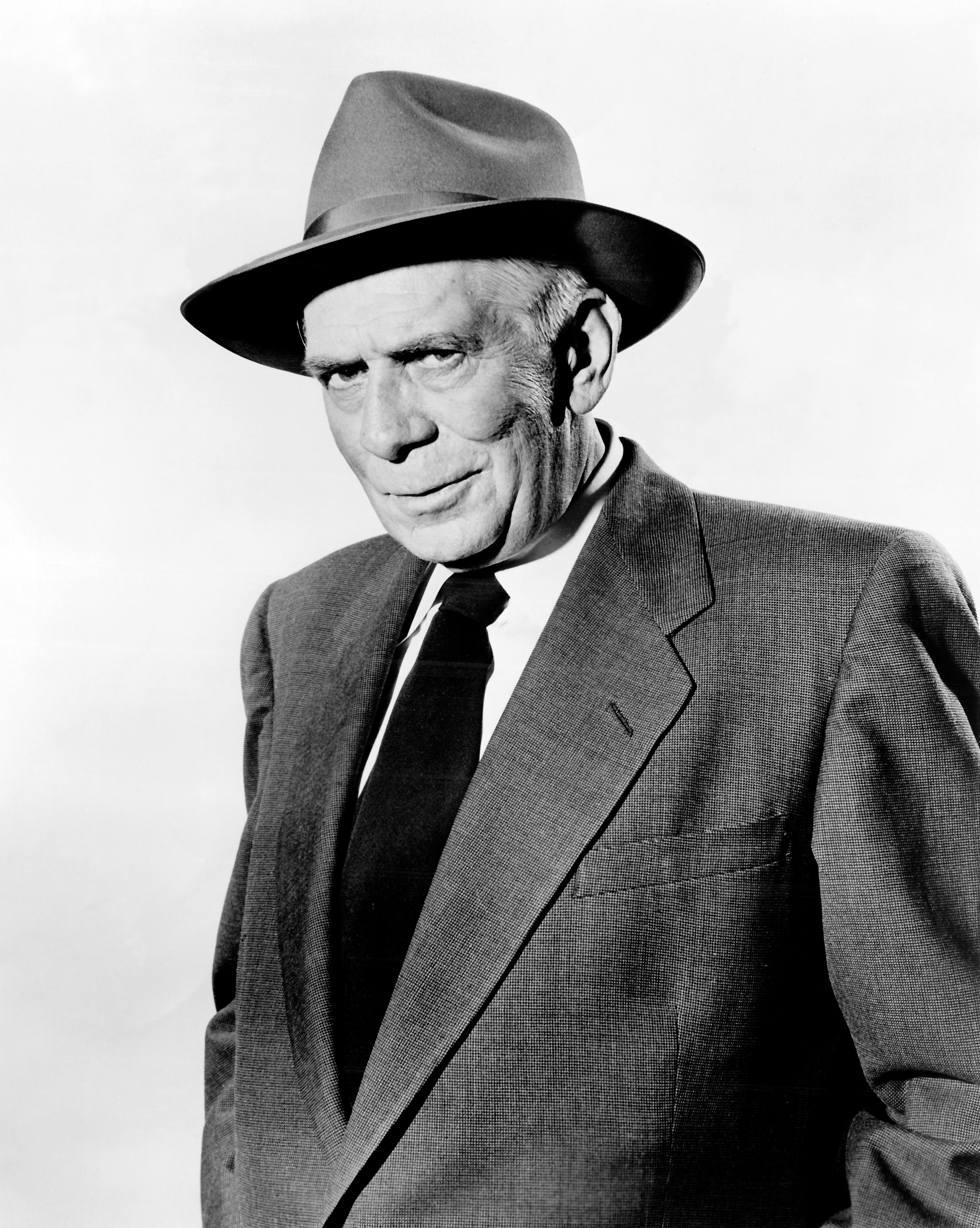
Lt. Arthur Tragg (Ray Collins)

Each episode's casting interviews were conducted by Gail Patrick Jackson, producer Ben Brady, and the director. Episodes typically employed 10 featured players in addition to the principal cast and extras. Numerous actors famous for past and future roles in film and television made guest appearances on the show.

"Many were people I'd worked with in movies," said Gail Patrick Jackson. "They were grateful and delivered on time—and powerfully. … Gloria Henry, Vaughn Taylor, Hillary Brooke, John Archer, Morris Ankrum, Don Beddoe, Fay Wray, Olive Blakeney, Paul Fix, Addison Richards. We also had newcomers like Darryl Hickman, Barbara Eden. The trick was to only use them once a year. People like Fay Wray came back several times, but as other characters."

Patrick made it a point to hire her Hollywood acting contemporaries whenever possible. Some were semiretired and financially well-off, but still enjoyed performing. Character actor George E. Stone (Note: George E. Stone appeared most often as court clerk. "Stone, a veteran actor, was sick and half blind during his tenure on the Mason show. Yet he stayed," wrote Perry Mason chroniclers Brian Kelleher and Diana Merrill. "'This company has heart,' is how one cast member explained Stone's presence.") was struggling financially after a series of medical procedures failed to improve his vision, and for years he appeared on Perry Mason (twice in character roles, then regularly as the court clerk) until his health made it impossible for him to work any longer. Patrick went to considerable lengths to find a part for an actress who had become paralyzed on one side; she played with her good side toward the camera.

"This isn't being the least altruistic," Patrick said. "They are all fine performers and bring to the shows something interesting and vital—even when they only have one line."

Patrick also accommodated Raymond Burr, when he had to miss a month's work in 1962 for a surgical procedure. Four episodes were filmed with guest stars—in succession, Bette Davis, Michael Rennie, Hugh O'Brian, and Walter Pidgeon—who carried most of the action. Burr filmed a few scenes for each episode before reporting for surgery. Burr also missed two episodes in Season Eight; Michael Connors and Barry Sullivan substituted for him.

Perry Mason also drew on the West Coast radio pool. Working steadily in radio since the 1940s, Raymond Burr was a leading player on the West Coast and in 1956 was the star of CBS Radio's Fort Laramie. Noted for his loyalty and consciousness of history, Burr went out of his way to employ his colleagues. Some 180 radio celebrities appeared on Perry Mason during the first season alone.

=== Writing ===
The production staff of Perry Mason worked at being technically correct and responsive to an audience that included lawyers and judges. Producer Ben Brady practiced law in New York before entering show business; story editor Gene Wang (pronounced "vahng"; he was of German heritage) graduated from law school in Florida; and executive producer Gail Patrick Jackson studied law for two years before becoming an actress.

Many episodes are based on novels and short stories by lawyer-turned-writer Erle Stanley Gardner. Only two of the 69 Perry Mason novels Gardner published before January 1963 (Note: The last Gardner novel adapted for the series was The Case of the Mischievous Doll (1963).) were not adapted for the series. (Note: Film historian Thomas Leitch lists three Gardner novels not adapted—The Case of the Counterfeit Eye (1936), The Case of the Golddigger's Purse (1945) and The Case of the Glamorous Ghost (1955)—but the last was, in fact, adapted for the fifth season.) All but three episodes in the first season were adapted from Gardner's stories. (Note: The three season-one scripts that were not adaptations were nevertheless based on Gardner novels, but were so substantially changed in the rewrite process that they were retitled: "The Case of the Deadly Double" ("The Case of the Borrowed Brunette"), "The Case of the Desperate Daughter" ("The Case of the Glamorous Ghost"), and "The Case of the Prodigal Parent" ("The Case of the Dubious Bridegroom").) In season two, 14 of the 39 episodes came from Gardner originals. With the backlist exhausted, later seasons presented between one and five episodes drawn from Gardner stories, with occasional remakes of earlier adaptations. By the summer of 1958, Patrick was already supervising the work of 31 writers who were developing original scripts based on Gardner's characters.

"Funny thing about writers," Patrick told TV Guide. "A lot of them think they'll improve on Erle. Most of them find out they can't even duplicate him."

Writers submitted a draft script, which was reviewed for continuity, narrative content, and legal error by Patrick and Wang. A revised draft was then forwarded to Gardner, who would respond with a detailed brief indicating particular changes required to conform with the law. Gardner closely supervised the scripts throughout the run of the series, and continued to write new Perry Mason novels.

By 1961, the strictures of the Perry Mason formula led Writer's Digest to declare, "This show has the reputation among writers as being the hardest one in Hollywood to work for."

=== Filming ===
==== Pilot ====
A test film, "The Case of the Moth-Eaten Mink", ultimately aired December 14, 1957, as the 13th episode of the first season. The pilot was filmed October 3–9, 1956, after Raymond Burr completed a film in Havana (Note: Burr was in Cuba filming Affair in Havana (working title The Fever Tree) from August through September 10, 1956.) and made a two-week tour of military hospitals in the West Indies.

"'The Case of the Moth-Eaten Mink' is written and directed very much like a noir B-feature of the period, from its stylishly dramatic opening to its violent climax," wrote film scholar Thomas Leitch. He noted that the pilot film "provides a fascinating laboratory for the formula, since it combines trademark elements that would become long-running features of the series with others that would be swiftly abandoned." The episode was directed by Ted Post, whose camera movement, use of deep space, and film noir stylings were softened or absent in subsequent episodes. Laurence Marks and Ben Starr adapted Erle Stanley Gardner's 1952 novel, retaining all its plot features and characters.

In her TV column in early November 1956, journalist Eve Starr reported, "Word is seeping down from CBS brass that its hour-long Perry Mason pilot film is a whooping success, so much so that the show will be held back until a good time period can be found for it next season."

On November 30, 1956, Gardner wrote Gail Patrick Jackson:

"I can't get over the feeling that I had sitting there watching that pilot film. … As I saw the manner in which your ideas, your tact and persistence had gradually changed the approach and resulted in a highly polished, finished product I was tremendously proud of you and of my association with you. I think that you saw possibilities in Raymond Burr which no one else saw. I think that you developed those possibilities and I think you have inspired not only the cast but the producers and directors. I think we are on the trail of a highly successful presentation."

==== Series ====
The series began filming in April 1957. (Note: After "The Case of the Moth-Eaten Mink", the first episode shot was "The Case of the Fan Dancer's Horse", filmed April 15–22, 1957. The next was "The Case of the Crimson Kiss" (April 24 – May 1, 1957).) Each episode was budgeted at $100,000, equivalent to $880,000 in 2025. Filming took place on Stage 8 at the 20th Century-Fox studios near Western Avenue and Sunset Boulevard (where the show's production offices were located) and at CBS Studio Center, with at least one location in each episode. Burr had lost 100 pounds, but continued to lose weight when filming began: "I just don't have time to eat," he said.

"Every six days Burr stars in what almost amounts to a full-length feature movie," wrote syndicated columnist Erskine Johnson. "He's in 98 percent of all the scenes." This punishing schedule for Burr was soon adjusted, as by midway through the first season a typical Perry Mason episode would open by focusing on the story of the client for most of the first act — Perry himself (and the other regular series characters) might not be introduced until 10–12 minutes into the show.

Still, the workload was enormous. "I had no life outside of Perry Mason," Burr recalled. "And that went on 24 hours a day, six days a week. I never went home at night. I lived on the lot. I got up at 3 o'clock every single morning to learn my lines for that day, and sometimes I hadn't finished until 9 o'clock. I had a kitchen, bedroom, office space, sitting room—all of that—on every lot I ever worked on."

Thirty-nine episodes were filmed in the first year. "Ray had key lines written on his shirtsleeve cuffs," said Gail Patrick Jackson.

Directors included Laslo Benedek, Jesse Hibbs, Arthur Marks, Christian Nyby, and William D. Russell. Some, including Lewis Allen and Richard Donner, had or would have notable directing credits in feature films. Many episodes incorporated the essential elements of film noir.

"The crew is giving it the best of Hollywood's techniques," Burr told columnist Erskine Johnson. The series was filmed at 20th Century-Fox and had veteran Fox staffers behind the scenes, including art director Lewis Creber (Note: Lewis Creber's credits as art director include Charlie Chan at the Opera and others in the series, Think Fast, Mr. Moto and others in the series, and Sun Valley Serenade.) and sound mixer Harry M. Leonard. Cameraman Frank Redman (Note: Frank Redman's credits include Murder on the Blackboard, The Saint in New York and others in the series, and four films in The Falcon series.) and makeup artist Mel Berns had been with RKO in the 1940s. Editor Richard Cahoon had been with Columbia Pictures in the 1930s. Another former Columbia editor, Art Seid, began as an editorial supervisor on Perry Mason and advanced to producer.

All but one of the episodes in the series were filmed in black-and-white. The episode "The Case of the Twice-Told Twist" was the sole exception. The president of CBS, William Paley, commissioned the color episode so he could see what the show would look like in color, should it be renewed for a tenth season (the season most prime-time shows went color).

=== Locations ===
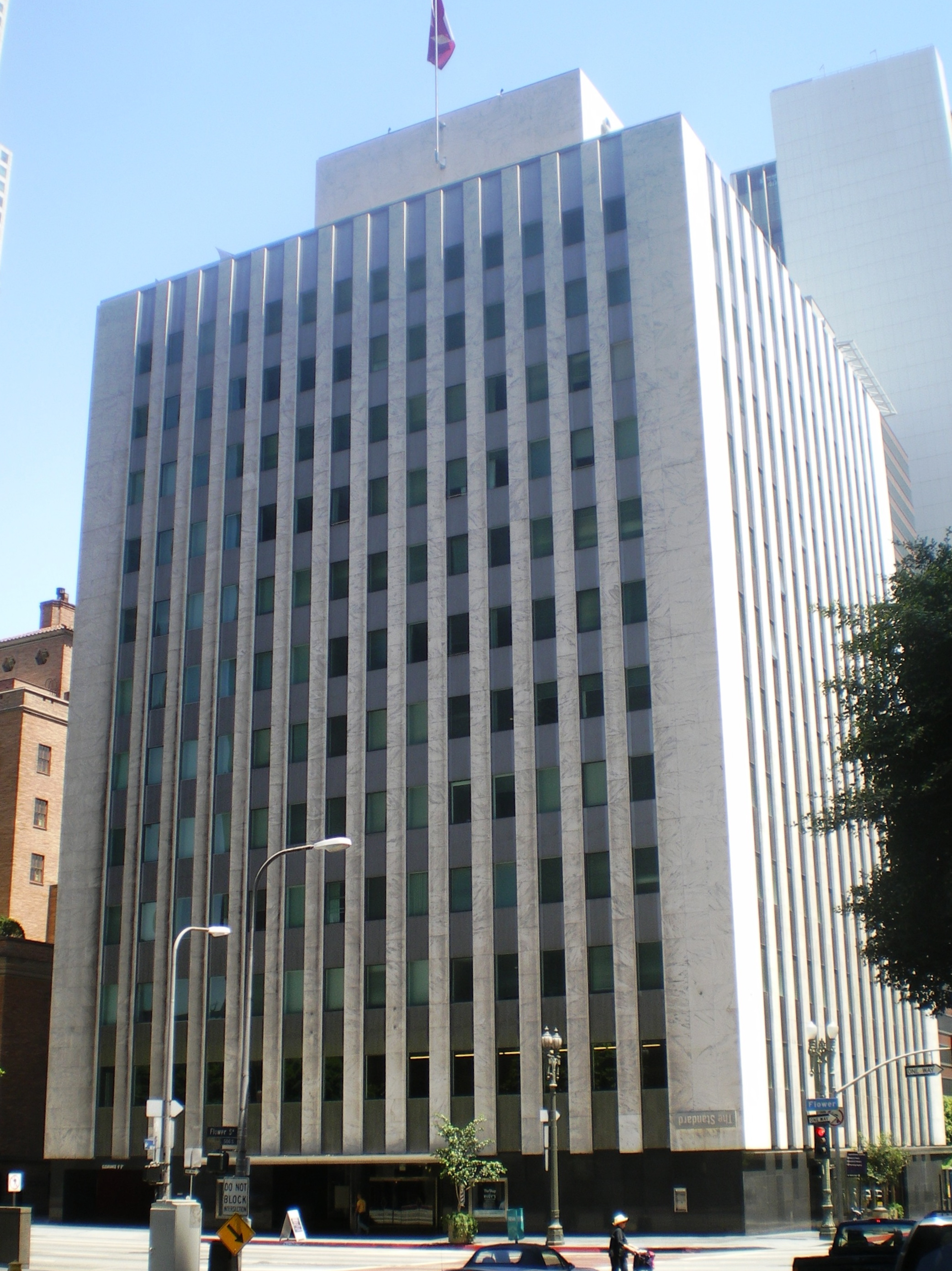
The Superior Oil Company Building in Los Angeles, used for exteriors of the fictional Brent Building where Perry Mason's offices were located (2008)

Perry Mason is set in Los Angeles; interior scenes were filmed on the 20th Century-Fox Western Avenue studio lot, and most exteriors were filmed at Fox Studios in Westwood, California, or the Movie Ranch in Malibu Canyon. Later episodes in the series were filmed at the former Charlie Chaplin Studios in Hollywood.

In the early years of the series, filming would be done on location in and around Culver City and a few downtown locales. In one episode, Drake gets out of a car on Wilshire Boulevard and goes into an apartment building; in the distant background, the lights and cameras from the set filming an episode of Peter Gunn are visible. Numerous establishing shots are used, including the iconic Civic Center, Los Angeles, the Hall of Justice building and the Los Angeles County Court House which is now the Stanley Mosk Courthouse. All of these buildings are still standing.

Mason's offices are in the Brent Building, Suite 904, phone MAdison 5–1190. (Note: The Madison telephone exchange covered Hollywood, Huntington Park and Los Angeles.) In Season 8 the number for the office is 272-2199. Although the Brent Building is fictional, the series used the entrance and exterior of the former Superior Oil Company Building, (Note: The first time this Brent Building location is seen is in "The Case of the Sulky Girl" (Season 1, Episode 5); earlier episodes used a set.) a modern structure in downtown Los Angeles completed in 1956. The building was registered in 2003 as a historical landmark and is now a hotel .

Scattered throughout the run were episodes that would take place beyond Burger's jurisdiction as Los Angeles County District Attorney. In 1960, when William Talman, who played Hamilton Burger, was suspended for allegedly violating the morals clause in his contract, several assistant prosecutors were seen in court. Talman had attended a party at which he was charged with having engaged in indecent activities. The charges were later dropped, and largely through the efforts of Burr, Jackson and Gardner, along with audience requests, Talman was reinstated.

=== Music ===
The show's theme music is one of the most recognizable in television. Composer Fred Steiner set out to write a theme that would project the two primary aspects of Mason's character—sophistication and toughness. "The piece he came up with, titled "Park Avenue Beat", pulsed with the power of the big city and the swagger of a beefy hero played to perfection by actor Raymond Burr," wrote the Los Angeles Times. Described by Steiner as "a piece of symphonic R&B", the Perry Mason theme heard at the opening and end credits became the composer's best-known work.

Much of the incidental music was drawn from the CBS-TV Music Library. This included music by Bernard Herrmann, who went uncredited since the cues were stock music that was edited into the score. Herrmann's music has been identified in the following episodes: "The Case of the Restless Redhead", "The Case of the Sleepwalker's Niece", "The Case of the Nervous Accomplice", The Case of the Drowning Duck", "The Case of the Silent Partner", "The Case of the Half-Wakened Wife", (Note: Herrmann wrote this music for Orson Welles's CBS radio play, The Hitch-Hiker (1941).) "The Case of the Calendar Girl", "The Case of the Spurious Sister" and "The Case of the Mythical Monkeys". Production records show Herrmann's music being used in 100 episodes, through "The Case of the Tandem Target" (Season 7, Episode 29).

=== Cancellation ===
Gail Patrick Jackson (left) and Erle Stanley Gardner speak with Hollywood columnist Norma Lee Browning during filming of the last Perry Mason episode, "The Case of the Final Fade-Out" (1966)

Perry Mason aired Saturday nights for its first five seasons, outdrawing competition including the first two seasons of NBC's Bonanza. Bonanza jumped to number two in the Nielsen ratings when it moved to Sunday nights in 1961. In 1962, CBS moved Perry Mason to Thursday nights, where it easily won the ratings for its time slot.

"CBS just got plain cocky," said executive producer Gail Patrick Jackson. "It irritated the suits to no end that Sundays at 8 was The Ed Sullivan Show with his huge rating, and then everybody switched to NBC's Bonanza. William S. Paley would rant about this every time we met."

By this time all three networks had begun broadcasting most of their primetime shows in color, but Perry Mason was still filmed in black-and-white and looked outdated compared to other current shows. Producer Arthur Marks recalled, "Our show was about to be canceled. Paley called Gail Patrick and wondered what the show would look like in color. I was in Gail's office when he called. He asked 'How much is it going to cost?' So I came up with a number -- and it wasn't that much, really -- to shoot the show in color. ["The Case of the Twice-Told Twist" was] about a bunch of car strippers with a Fagin. Paley loved the idea and said go. And so, we did the show in color."

Patrick went on about Paley: "Then, for the September '65 season he floored me by telling the affiliates we'd be going Sundays at 9 with a mandate to demolish Bonanza. Just like that. He finally let me shoot in color but we never had a chance. We improved ratings for CBS but Bonanza was the leader and Paley simply canceled us completely in 1966. After nine seasons and 271 episodes we were dust."

The network gave no particular reason for the cancellation. "CBS figures we are worn out," Patrick told The New York Times in November 1965. "But this season the show is getting more mail than ever before and so is Raymond."

Burr had wanted to leave Perry Mason after five years, but was always persuaded to extend his contract. Network executives implored him to stay for a tenth season, to be filmed in color. "They shot one show in color and I said 'no'," Burr recalled, "and they gave me such a big thing, talked about my loyalty and all that, and they guaranteed the quality of the show and said, 'Let's go off with a big bang.' This was all of the people at CBS." Burr agreed to do the tenth season. Three weeks after the meeting, he picked up the trade papers and read that the series had been canceled.

The last episode of the series, "The Case of the Final Fade-Out", was filmed April 12–19, 1966. Set in a TV film studio where two murders occur, the last show offered the entire production crew an opportunity to appear on camera. Most of the behind-the-scenes personnel in the episode had been with the show the entire nine years. Patrick made a cameo appearance herself, and persuaded Erle Stanley Gardner to make his acting debut as the judge who presides over the second trial.

=== Other adaptations ===
Preceding the 1957 series, a series of movies were made in the 1930s, as well as a radio show that started airing in 1943.

At least three series have been made about the Perry Mason character after the cancellation of the 1957 series, including a series of television films for NBC, starting with Perry Mason Returns in 1985, featuring the two then-surviving cast members, Raymond Burr and Barbara Hale.

Other attempts include a short-lived 1973 series, also at CBS, and more recently, a 2020 HBO series.

== Episodes ==
Season	Episodes	Originally released	
Season	Episodes	First released	Last released
1	39	September 21, 1957	June 28, 1958
2	30	September 20, 1958	June 27, 1959
3	26	October 3, 1959	June 11, 1960
4	28	September 17, 1960	June 10, 1961
5	30	September 2, 1961	May 26, 1962
6	28	September 27, 1962	May 16, 1963
7	30	September 26, 1963	May 21, 1964
8	30	September 24, 1964	May 13, 1965
9	30	September 12, 1965	May 22, 1966

When asked by a fan why Perry Mason won every case, Burr told her, "But madam, you see only the cases I try on Saturday."

Mason is known to have lost, in some form or manner, three cases—"The Case of the Terrified Typist", "The Case of the Witless Witness", and "The Case of the Deadly Verdict".

Mason also loses a civil case at the beginning of "The Case of the Dead Ringer", partly due to being framed for witness tampering. His staff and he then spend the rest of the episode trying to prove his innocence. They eventually do, and although this is not stated explicitly, the verdict of the civil case is presumably either overturned or declared a mistrial. In a July 15, 2009, interview on NPR's program All Things Considered, Barbara Hale claimed that all of Mason's lost cases were declared mistrials off the air.

Mason did lose, at least by inference, a capital case mentioned in the 1958 episode "The Case of the Desperate Daughter". Mason and Della Street are first seen preparing a last-minute appeal for a "Mr. Hudson" who has an impending date with the gas chamber.

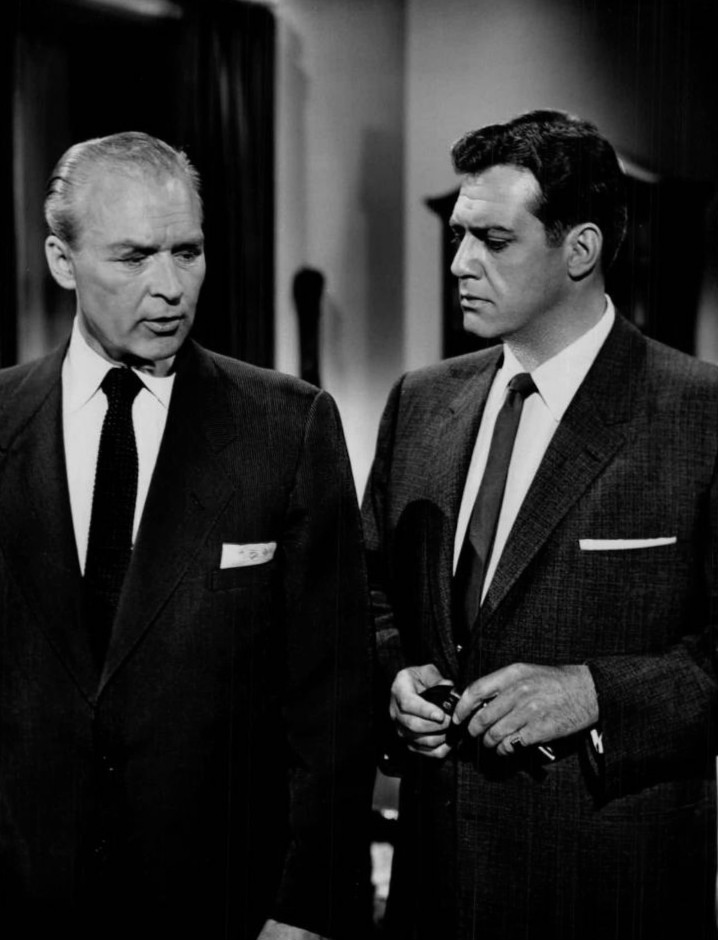
Ralph Clanton and Burr in the series premiere, "The Case of the Restless Redhead" (1957)

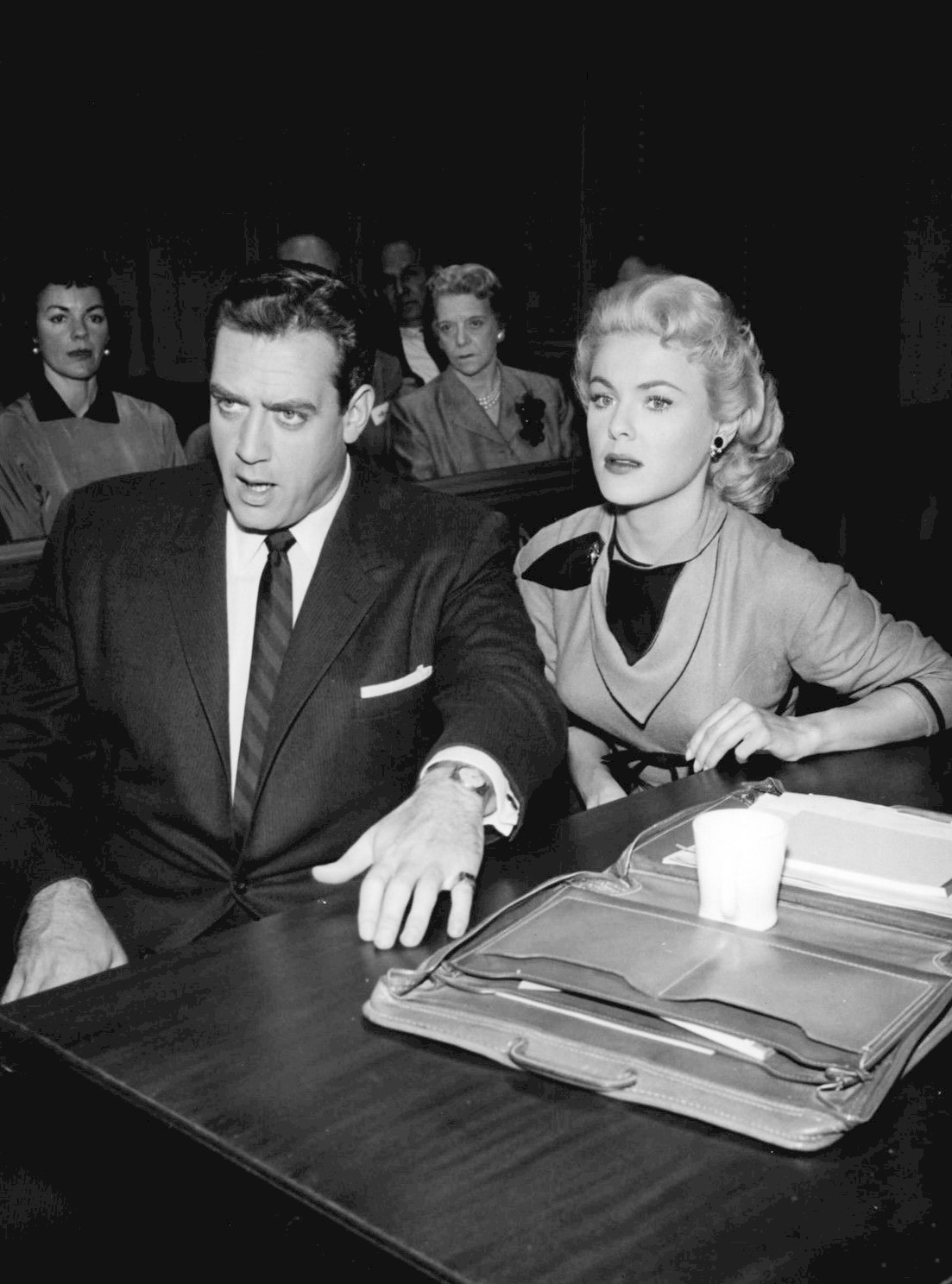
Burr and Kathleen Crowley in "The Case of the Lonely Heiress" (1958)

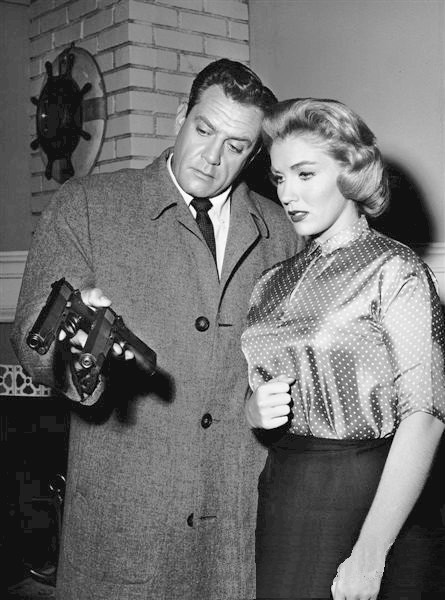
Burr and Joan O'Brien in "The Case of the Singing Skirt" (1960)

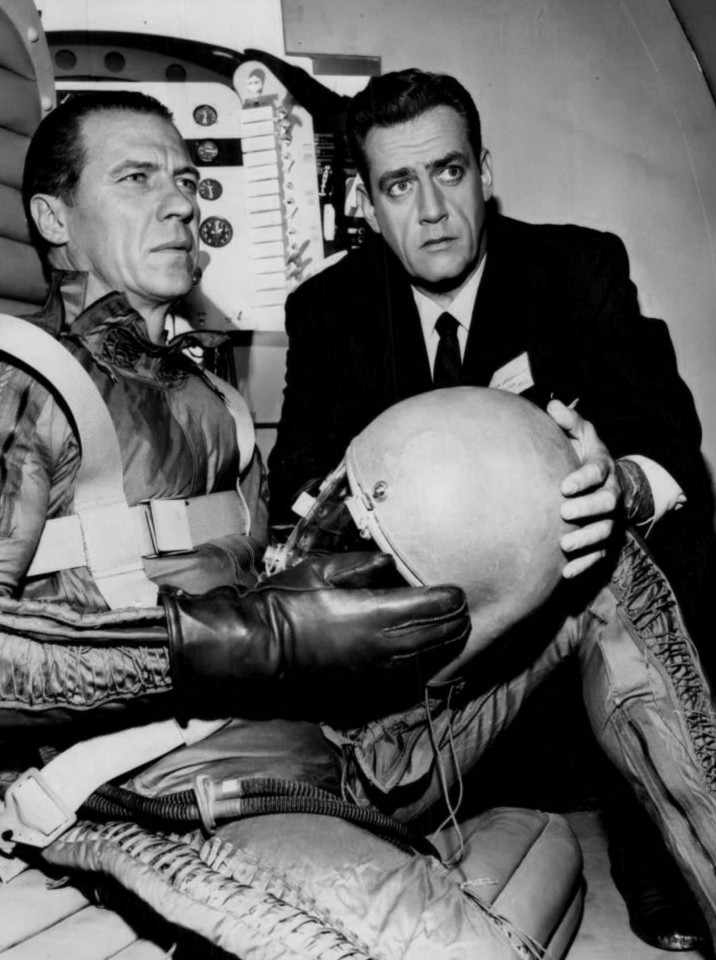
Robert Bray and Burr in "The Case of the Angry Astronaut" (1962)

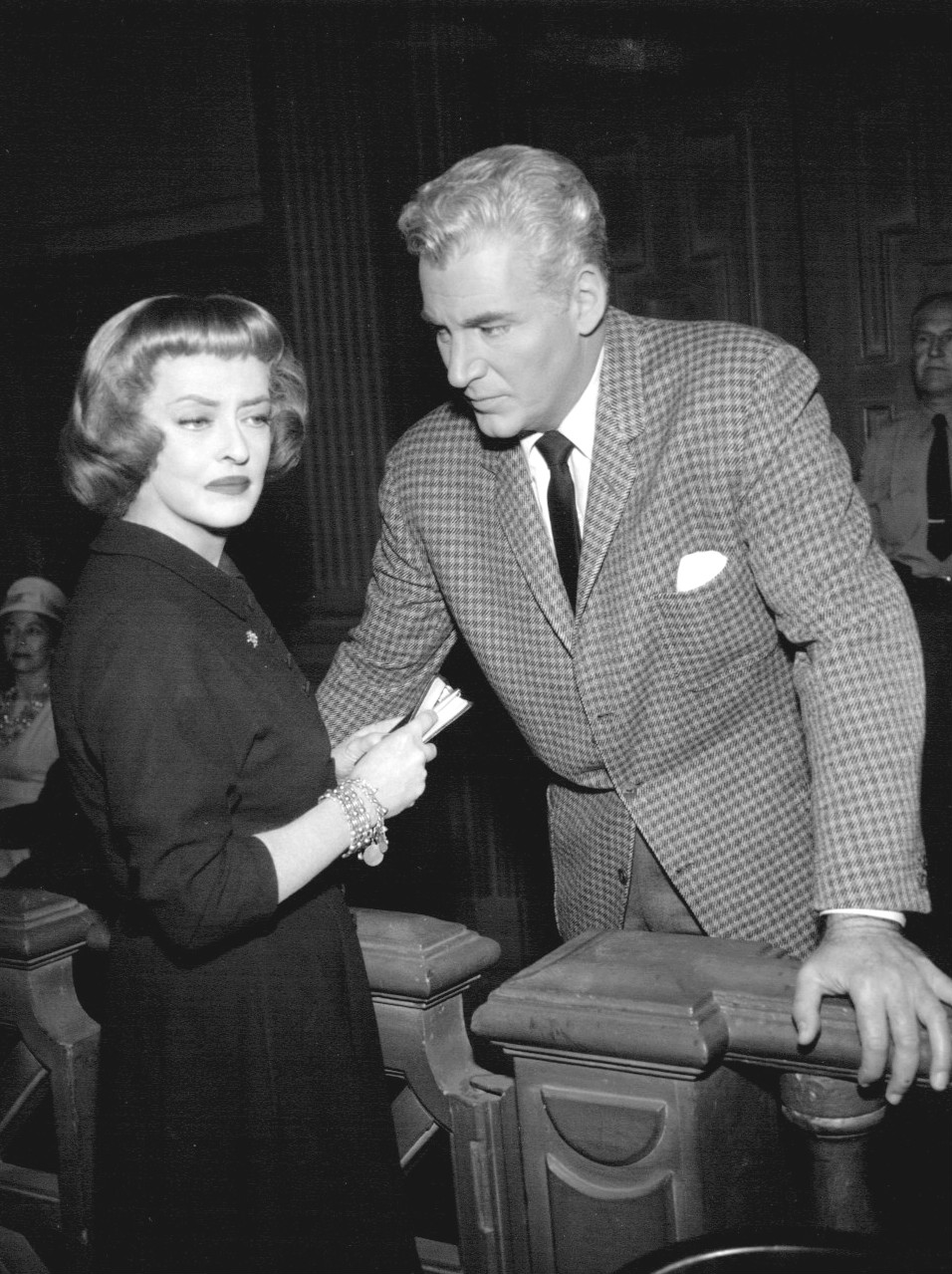
Bette Davis and William Hopper in "The Case of Constant Doyle"

== Broadcast ==
=== Broadcast history ===
Perry Mason aired on CBS from September 21, 1957, to May 22, 1966.

- Saturday at 7:30 p.m. ET September 21, 1957 – May 26, 1962 (Seasons 1–5)
- Thursday at 8 p.m. ET September 27, 1962 – May 16, 1963 (Season 6)
- Thursday at 9 p.m. ET September 26, 1963 – May 21, 1964 (Season 7)
- Thursday at 8 p.m. ET September 24, 1964 – May 13, 1965 (Season 8)
- Sunday at 9 p.m. ET September 12, 1965 – May 22, 1966 (Season 9)

=== Syndication ===
At the time of its cancellation, Perry Mason was or had been airing in 58 countries, subtitled in 10x languages and dubbed in 10 more.

Perry Mason has been a staple in syndication, running for many years on local television stations and cable networks across the United States. Originally, only 195 of the 271 episodes were available to stations. This followed the then-standard broadcast and sponsorship schedule of 39 weeks' worth of episodes, allowing stations and sponsors to change over to a different series during the summer cycle of 13 weeks. The series proved so popular, however, that at the end of the 39 weeks, the stations would start the series all over again with the vintage-1957 episodes.

The original syndication package of 195 episodes included all of the first six seasons (except the four Season 6 episodes with guest-star attorneys, in which Raymond Burr makes only brief appearances), four episodes of Season 7, and 14 episodes of the ninth and final season (including the final episode). It was not until the mid-1980s when TBS obtained the rights to the remaining episodes that all 271 Perry Mason episodes were seen in syndication.

Episodes broadcast in syndicated reruns are usually heavily edited, to allow for more time for commercials.

The TV series is currently shown weekdays on MeTV, FETV and Great American Family, as well as on local stations in various local markets. Portland, Oregon station KPTV first aired evening repeats of Perry Mason in 1966. In 1970, the station began the long tradition of showing reruns of Perry Mason weekdays during its noon time slot. This unprecedented run ended 42 years later, on September 3, 2012, when KPTV ceased broadcasting the show. It continued to be shown on KPDX, duopoly of KPTV, in the 8 AM time slot through September 12, 2014. The series was distributed by CBS Films, then Viacom Enterprises, Paramount Domestic Television and CBS Paramount Domestic Television, CBS Television Distribution, and now by CBS Media Ventures.

CBS posted full 60-minute episodes on its website from the first and second seasons for viewing.

Prime Video streams episodes on its website from seasons 1–9 for viewing.

=== Video on demand ===
A 2014 article in The Atlantic that examined how Netflix categorized nearly 77,000 different personalized genres found that Perry Mason star Raymond Burr was rated as the favorite actor by Netflix users. Barbara Hale was rated seventh. Christian I. Nyby II, the director of many of the television movies, and his father Christian Nyby, who directed many episodes of the TV series, led the list of directors. Todd Yellin, vice president of product innovation for Netflix and the person who designed the system, was at a loss to explain what journalist Alexis Madrigal called "this weird Perry Mason thing".

== Reception ==
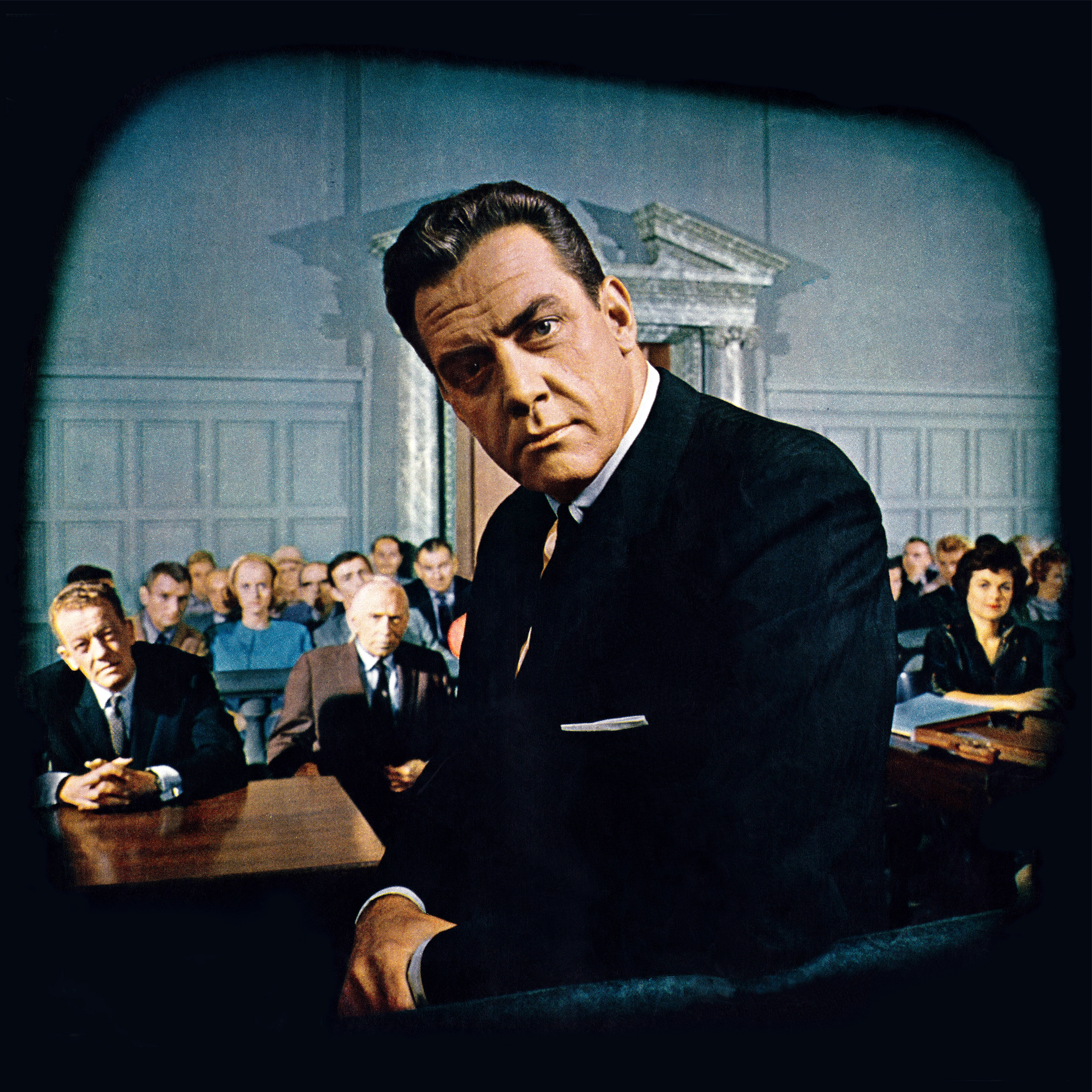
Raymond Burr and other cast members on the set of Perry Mason, from the front cover of Look magazine (October 10, 1961)

"Perry Mason was television's most successful and longest-running lawyer series," wrote TV historian Tim Brooks. "It remains, I think, the best detective series ever made for television," wrote film historian Jon Tuska. "The definitive portrayal, of course, was by former screen heavy Raymond Burr on the CBS series (1957–1966) in scripts faithfully based on Gardner's novels", wrote mystery writer Max Allan Collins.

=== Ratings ===
Season	Rank	Rating	Notes
1 – October 1957–April 1958	43	24.3	
2 – October 1958–April 1959	19	27.5	
3 – October 1959–April 1960	10	28.3	
4 – October 1960–April 1961	16	24.9	
5 – October 1961–April 1962	5	27.3	
6 – October 1962–April 1963	23	22.4	
7 – October 1963–April 1964	26	22.1	
8 – October 1964–April 1965	38	20.7	
9 – October 1965–April 1966	69	16.9	

=== Awards ===
==== Emmy Awards ====
- 1958: Perry Mason was nominated as Primetime Emmy Award for Outstanding Drama Series at the 10th Primetime Emmy Awards
- 1959: Raymond Burr received the Emmy Award for Primetime Emmy Award for Outstanding Lead Actor in a Drama Series at the 11th Primetime Emmy Awards.
- 1959: Barbara Hale received the Emmy Award for Primetime Emmy Award for Outstanding Supporting Actress in a Dramatic Series at the 11th Primetime Emmy Awards.
- 1959: William Hopper was nominated as Primetime Emmy Award for Outstanding Supporting Actor in a Drama Series at the 11th Primetime Emmy Awards.
- 1960: Raymond Burr received a nomination for Outstanding Performance by an Actor in a Series (Lead or Support) at the 12th Primetime Emmy Awards.
- 1961: Raymond Burr received the Emmy Award for Outstanding Performance by an Actor in a Series (Lead) at the 13th Primetime Emmy Awards.
- 1961: Barbara Hale was nominated for Outstanding Performance in a Supporting Role by an Actor or Actress in a Series at the 13th Primetime Emmy Awards.
- 1961: Perry Mason was nominated for Outstanding Achievement in Film Editing for Television at the 13th Primetime Emmy Awards.
- 1966: Perry Mason received an Emmy nomination for Individual Achievements in Electronic Production – Audio Engineering at the 18th Primetime Emmy Awards.

==== TV Guide Awards ====
- 1960: Perry Mason was honored as Favorite Series in TV Guide magazine's inaugural TV Guide Award readers poll.
- 1960: Raymond Burr received the first annual TV Guide Award for Favorite Male Performer, for Perry Mason.
- 1961: Perry Mason received the second annual TV Guide Award for Favorite Series.
- 1961: Raymond Burr received the second annual TV Guide Award for Favorite Male Performer, for Perry Mason.

==== Silver Gavel Award ====
- 1960: Perry Mason received the first Silver Gavel Award for television drama presented by the American Bar Association. Raymond Burr accepted the award for Paisano Productions.

=== Influence ===
In her Supreme Court nomination before the United States Senate Committee on the Judiciary in July 2009, Supreme Court nominee Sonia Sotomayor prefaced her remarks on the role of the prosecutor by saying that she was inspired by watching Perry Mason as a child. "I was influenced so greatly by a television show in igniting the passion that I had as being a prosecutor, and it was Perry Mason", Sotomayor said. In her 2013 memoir the Associate Justice of the Supreme Court of the United States wrote of the show's influence on her while she was growing up in a Bronx housing project. (Note: Nina Totenberg's NPR story on Sonia Sotomayor uses an excerpt from "The Case of the Prodigal Parent" (episode 1-36).) She granted that the defense attorney was the show's hero, "but my sympathies were not entirely monopolized by Perry Mason. I was fond of Burger, the prosecutor, too. I liked that he was a good loser, that he was more committed to finding the truth than to winning his case. If the defendant was truly innocent, he once explained, and the case was dismissed, then he had done his job because justice had been served." (Note: At the conclusion of "The Case of the Purple Woman" (episode 2-9), Burger congratulates Mason on another courtroom victory. When Della observes that he seems almost pleased with the outcome, Burger says, "I am." Mason then says, "Della, there was an article in the Law Journal recently. Let me quote you the last paragraph: 'A well tried criminal case is a credit to all involved. There is no winning or no losing in the true administration of justice.' The article was signed, 'Hamilton Burger'.") She was particularly fascinated by the judge.

"There was a whole new vocabulary here," Sotomayor wrote. "And though I wasn't sure what every detail meant, I followed the gist of it. It was like the puzzles I enjoyed, a complex game with its own rules, and one that intersected with grand themes of right and wrong. I was intrigued and determined to figure it out."

=== Cultural references ===
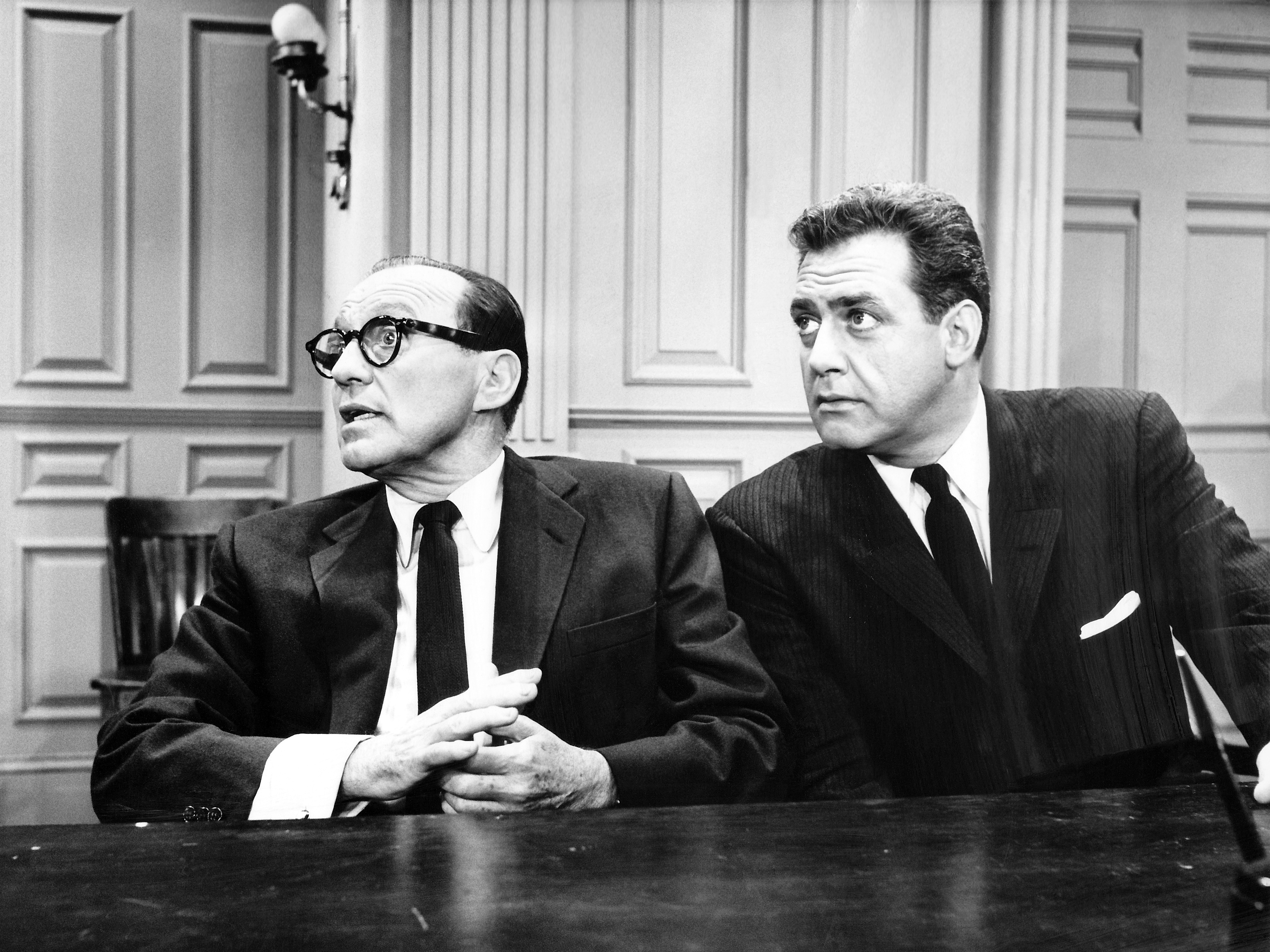
Perry Mason (Raymond Burr) defends Jack Benny, on trial for murder, in an episode of CBS-TV's The Jack Benny Program (1961)

- A Perry Mason parody titled "Perry Masonry" appeared in the August 1959 issue of Cracked magazine, in which Hamilton Burger actually wins a court case.
- A Perry Mason parody titled "The Night That Perry Masonmint Lost a Case" appeared in the July 1959 issue of Mad magazine.
- A Perry Mason parody cameo titled "The Defensers" appeared in the July 1965 issue of Mad magazine. in which a pair of father/son attorneys see their client Perry Mason is not only found guilty but sentenced to the electric chair!
- Raymond Burr made a guest appearance in an episode of The Jack Benny Program, titled "Jack on Trial for Murder" (November 5, 1961). He appears in character as Perry Mason in Benny's dream sequence about being tried for killing a rooster. Other Perry Mason cast include Grandon Rhodes as the process server, Frank Wilcox as the judge and George E. Stone as court clerk.
- The character of Perry Mason was spoofed in an episode of the animated series The Flintstones, titled "Little Bamm-Bamm" (October 3, 1963). When the Rubbles try to adopt Bamm-Bamm with the help of attorney "Bronto Burger", they end up in court facing attorney "Perry Masonry, who's never lost a case".

The Blues Brothers recorded a cover version of Fred Steiner's Perry Mason TV series theme for the 1980 album Made in America. It was later used in the 1998 film Blues Brothers 2000 and released on the soundtrack album.

The Perry Mason theme was used as the refrain in the 1981 song "My World Is Empty" (a cover of The Supreme's "My World Is Empty Without You") by The Del-Byzanteens, featuring the vocals of future film director Jim Jarmusch.

Perry Mason was satirized in a 1990 episode of the Australian sketch comedy series Fast Forward.

Ozzy Osbourne's 1995 album, Ozzmosis, opens with a track titled "Perry Mason". Released as a single, the song was the first to integrate the music of Perry Mason into what one reviewer described as a "bruising rocker … complete with an ominous excerpt from the classic TV show theme".

In the video game Apollo Justice: Ace Attorney, the system of saved data from courts, the MASON System, was named in reference to Perry Mason.

"Suicide", a song by the Irish hard rock band Thin Lizzy, was inspired by the episode "The Case of the Lover's Leap" (season 6, episode 23). It appears on the band's 1975 album Fighting.

A running gag on Svengoolie involves pointing out cast members of the movie being shown who had also appeared on "Perry Mason."

Perry Mason is referenced several times in AMC's Better Call Saul, most notably in the episode "Chicanery", when Chuck McGill says that his brother, Jimmy McGill, wants to "Split me apart at the seams like a murderer confessing on an episode of Perry Mason".

== Home media ==
=== United States and Canada ===
CBS Home Entertainment has released all nine seasons of Perry Mason on Region 1 DVD. Each season was released in two-volume half-season sets because each season of Perry Mason contains considerably more material than a modern TV series. The first season of Perry Mason featured 39 episodes, Season 3 had 26 episodes, and all other seasons had either 28 or 30 episodes; this compares with 22 for a typical modern series. In addition, Perry Mason episodes are 50–53 minutes long, while a 2014 Nielsen study found that modern one-hour shows are shortened to accommodate 14 to 15 minutes of commercials.

The DVDs contain the original full-length version of each episode. (Note: There was one exception, an error that was later rectified. The second season episode, "The Case of the Fancy Figures", was missing about a minute of dialog in the initial Region 1 DVD release. Subsequent issues have included the full unedited version with the exception of one episode from the Season 7, Volume 1, disc 1, "The Case Of The Nebulous Nephew, the closing credits were substituted with the closing credits from S8, V2, D2,"The Case of The Sad Sicilian".)

In April 2008, a special 50th anniversary DVD set was released with selected episodes from the then-unreleased Seasons 3–9. Barbara Hale, sometimes joined by director and producer Arthur Marks, provides an on-camera introduction to each episode. Bonus material includes the 1956 film tests of Burr and Hopper, just discovered in the CBS vaults; interviews with Hale, Marks, and CBS executive Anne Roberts Nelson; a short documentary about Erle Stanley Gardner; a cast appearance on Pantomime Quiz; a 1958 Person to Person segment in which Burr (at his home in Malibu) is interviewed by Charles Collingwood; two CBS News Nightwatch interviews of Burr by Charlie Rose; the anti-smoking public service announcement William Talman made on behalf of the American Cancer Society shortly before his death from lung cancer; and the first of the made-for-TV movies, Perry Mason Returns. Film historian Stuart Galbraith IV called the 50th anniversary set "a must-have … especially for its extra features".

==== Region 1 DVD releases ====
Title	Contents	Length	Release date
Perry Mason: Season 1, Volume 1	19 episodes	1,000 minutes	July 11, 2006
Perry Mason: Season 1, Volume 2	20 episodes	1,040 minutes	November 21, 2006
Perry Mason: Season 2, Volume 1	15 episodes	773 minutes	June 19, 2007
Perry Mason: Season 2, Volume 2	15 episodes	774 minutes	November 13, 2007
Perry Mason: 50th Anniversary Edition	12 episodes	714 minutes	April 8, 2008
Perry Mason: Season 3, Volume 1	12 episodes	624 minutes	August 19, 2008
Perry Mason: Season 3, Volume 2	14 episodes	728 minutes	December 2, 2008
Perry Mason: Season 4, Volume 1	16 episodes	831 minutes	June 9, 2009
Perry Mason: Season 4, Volume 2	12 episodes	623 minutes	December 8, 2009
Perry Mason: Season 5, Volume 1	15 episodes	764 minutes	April 20, 2010
Perry Mason: Season 5, Volume 2	15 episodes	773 minutes	November 16, 2010
Perry Mason: Season 6, Volume 1	14 episodes	710 minutes	October 4, 2011
Perry Mason: Season 6, Volume 2	14 episodes	709 minutes	November 22, 2011
Perry Mason: Season 7, Volume 1	15 episodes	759 minutes	August 21, 2012
Perry Mason: Season 7, Volume 2	15 episodes	758 minutes	October 23, 2012
Perry Mason: Season 8, Volume 1	15 episodes	773 minutes	November 27, 2012
Perry Mason: Season 8, Volume 2	15 episodes	772 minutes	January 15, 2013
Perry Mason: Final Season, Season 9, Volume 1	15 episodes	776 minutes	June 11, 2013
Perry Mason: Final Season, Season 9, Volume 2	15 episodes	778 minutes	August 13, 2013
Perry Mason: The Complete Series	271 episodes	13,965 minutes	October 4, 2016

=== International ===
==== Region 2 DVD releases ====
In Region 2, Paramount Home Entertainment has released the first three seasons in complete sets on DVD in the UK.

==== Region 4 DVD releases ====
In Region 4, Paramount Home Entertainment has released the first two seasons on DVD in Australia/New Zealand. These releases are similar to the Region 1 releases whereby each season has been released in two-volume sets.

Via Vision Entertainment re-released the series in Australia in 2019.

DVD name	Format	Ep #	Discs/Tapes	Region 4 (Australia)	Special features	Distributors
Perry Mason Collection One (Seasons 1–3)	DVD	N/A	25	February 20, 2019	N/A	Via Vision Entertainment
Perry Mason Collection Two (Seasons 4–6)	DVD	N/A	23	April 3, 2019	None	Via Vision Entertainment
Perry Mason Collection Three (Seasons 7–9)	DVD	90	25	June 19, 2019	includes a bonus disc with new and vintage extras	Via Vision Entertainment

== See also ==
- Perry Mason (2020 series)
- Perry Mason moment
- Perry Mason syndrome
