= The Film Music Society =

The Film Music Society (formerly the Society for the Preservation of Film Music) is an international non-profit organization supporting the preservation of music from motion pictures and television programs.

== Mission ==
Patterned after the National Geographic Society, and the Institute of the American Musical (Miles Kreuger, Founder and President) in Hollywood, The Film Music Society has sought broad public support for a mission of national scope: to preserve for posterity the mostly unpublished materials created in the composition, orchestration, and recording of American motion picture music or film music — Sheet Music (composers' manuscripts, orchestrations, orchestra parts), recordings (disc, tape, soundtracks), and documents (cue sheets, contracts, correspondence).

== History ==
The Society was founded in 1972.

With the advent of sound films circa 1928 the safekeeping of specially composed film score materials was under the sole purview of the movie studios who owned them and the composers who were employed to write the music. Mostly these materials were stored and continue to be stored in studio music department libraries and in film vaults only accessible to studio personnel. In the heyday of the Hollywood studio system (c. 1920s-1950s), film composers often retained their manuscripts and recordings of their music given to them by the studios as a courtesy. When scoring independent films composers often retained all the score materials themselves, but not the actual music track or soundtrack, which was kept by the production company.

In 1937, producer and film industry visionary David O. Selznick proposed that copies of selected scores should be deposited at the Museum of Modern Art in New York City, though the plan did not materialize. Ten years later, British musicologist Frederick W. Sternfeld organized the College Committee on Film Music, composed of musicologists, teachers, and librarians, whose goal was to make films, scripts, and copies of film music materials available for study to scholars and students. Some of the material Sternfeld collected for this purpose is preserved in the Rauner Special Collections Library of Dartmouth College and in the Bodleian Library of Oxford University.

Unfortunately the College Committee had been disbanded by the late 1950s, at a time when the studio music departments began to discard portions of their older holdings, believing them to be of no further practical use or commercial value. Probably the greatest single loss occurred in the late 1960s when Metro-Goldwyn-Mayer Studios in Culver City, CA, discarded all of its orchestra parts and full scores (orchestrations), material that was both priceless and irreplaceable. At the same time music tracks recorded on nitrate film or magnetic film had begun to deteriorate.

Responding to what was dubbed the "M-G-M Holocaust" by film historians, the veteran film and TV composer Fred Steiner formed a small watchdog group in the 1970s that included himself, his film composer colleague David Raksin, and music librarian Jon Newsom of the Library of Congress Music Division. They would periodically visit the studio music departments and encourage departmental personnel not to discard any material before a new home could be found for it, such as colleges or universities, institutions where collections of other film-related material had already been established. In time Steiner believed that there should be a national organization to promote greater public awareness of this precious and unique cultural legacy and to preserve its heritage.

The tragic historical lesson of the ancient Library of Alexandria in Egypt being burned was that as long as only one copy of a book exists, it is not safe from destruction. Were it not for the copies laboriously made by the scribes in the Alexandria Library that were then placed in other libraries of antiquity, all would have been lost forever. Knowing of that historical precedent, as a corollary to the continuing vigilance of Steiner's watchdog group, the formation of the Society as a national non-profit membership organization was initiated by Rosar in 1983, and underwritten by soundtrack collector, Henry P. Adams. Its mandate was to seek out film music collections, whether at the studios or in the hands of composers, donate them to academic libraries, and make preservation copies of them to be placed in other repositories. Since its founding the Society has published a quarterly newsletter, The Cue Sheet, which reports its activities, and includes articles and interviews on film music topics.

Rather like an invisible college, the Founding Board of Directors included a diverse group of individuals, who all shared knowledge and a common love for film music: A composer (Fred Steiner), a film journalist (Tony Thomas), a librarian (Linda Mehr of the Academy of Motion Picture Arts and Sciences Library), a motion picture music editor (George Korngold, also a record producer and son of film composer Erich Wolfgang Korngold), film historians (Rudy Behlmer, Clifford McCarty, and William H. Rosar), a performing arts programmer (Jay Alan Quantrill), and an attorney (Leslie Zador, son of film composer Eugene Zador). William H. Rosar served as its first President (1984–89) and subsequently as its first Executive Director (1989–90). Incorporated as a California non-profit public corporation in 1984, the organization changed its name to The Film Music Society in 1997. The current president is composer David Newman, son of the celebrated film composer, Alfred Newman.

In 1990, William H. Rosar went on to found the International Film Music Society, a learned society of scholars studying film from the standpoint of musicology, and which in 2011 established the Institute for Film Music Studies for that purpose. He is editor of the first learned journal in the field, The Journal of Film Music, which is the official organ of the Institute.
