= Undersea Girl =

- Theatrical release poster
- Directed by: John Peyser
- Screenplay by: Arthur V. Jones
- Produced by: Norman T. Herman
- Starring: Mara Corday; Pat Conway; Florence Marly; Dan Seymour; Ralph Clanton; Myron Healey
- Cinematography: Hal McAlpin
- Edited by: Richard C. Meyer
- Music by: Alexander Courage
- Production company: Nacirema Productions
- Distributed by: Allied Artists Pictures
- Release date: September 22, 1957
- Running time: 74 minutes
- Country: United States
- Language: English

Undersea Girl is a 1957 American crime film directed by John Peyser and written by Arthur V. Jones. The film stars Mara Corday, Pat Conway, Florence Marly, Dan Seymour, Ralph Clanton and Myron Healey. The film was released on September 22, 1957, by Allied Artists Pictures.

== Plot ==
Reporter Val Hudson is scuba diving with three of her friends on a reef off the California coast when they come upon a man's dead body. After police lieutenant Mike Travis supervises the removal of the corpse, he returns to headquarters to find a sailor, Frank Larkin, being booked for participating in a bar brawl. Larkin has eight thousand dollars in new notes in his possession and refuses to divulge their source.

When Mike learns that the man found in the ocean also had eighteen hundred dollars of similar notes in his clothing, he orders a check on the origins of the currency. In Washington, D.C., a navy commander informs Lt. Brad Chase, an intelligence officer, that the notes were part of a two-million-dollar shipment from the Federal Reserve Bank for wartime counter-intelligence activities in Japan. The ship on which the money was being transported hit a mine outside the Yokohama bay and sank years ago. Later, two naval frogmen assigned to retrieve the cash disappeared. Now several of the notes, identified by their serial numbers, have shown up in California. After the commander orders Brad, a former Los Angeles crime reporter, to investigate, he returns to California where he meets his old friend Mike and his former rival Val, who senses a story in the offing. Larkin has been freed but is under police surveillance and Mike suggests that, because both Larkin and the dead man were tuna boat fishermen, they might find some clues at the harbor. Meanwhile, Swede Nelson, one of the two naval frogmen originally assigned to retrieve the sunken money, is aboard an offshore tuna boat, awaiting a signal from his partner Sam Marvin. After killing his diving companion, Swede tried to retrieve the money on his own for several years until enlisting Marvin's backing and help in transporting the cash to Panama where a tuna boat picked it up and took it to California. At Marvin's signal, Swede leads a team of three divers as they submerge to hide the money, encased in metal containers, in a cave underneath the sea. The divers surface on the beach and rendezvous with Marvin's girl friend, Leila Graham, who used to be Swede's girl. Worried by the fact that some notes are now in circulation, Marvin discovers that Larkin and another member of the boat's crew helped themselves to the cash to cover gambling debts. The body found floating in the ocean belonged to Larkin's partner, and now Marvin assigns Leila and Swede to kill Larkin. As Swede and Leila leave the hotel after murdering Larkin, they cross paths with Brad, who has come to question Larkin. Later, although Val is angered when Brad denies her access to the case, they have dinner together and Brad reminds her that the last time they were in the restaurant he had asked her to marry him, but she, more interested in her career, had declined. Across the dining room, Brad sees Swede and Leila, who is trying to persuade her former lover to double-cross Marvin. Realizing that he saw them outside Larkin's apartment building, Brad, with Val's help, acquires Swede's fingerprints. The next day, when Marvin finds out that Swede intends to keep the money, he orders the other divers to kill Swede while he is underwater.

Meanwhile, Mike runs a check on Swede's fingerprints and discovers that he was one of the original frogmen sent to locate the money. After Swede's body washes up on the beach, Val decides that there must be something in the ocean that men are willing to die for and with a photographer friend, Susie, dives to investigate. Brad follows them and rescues them from a shark attack. Val and Brad then wonder if the money might be hidden underwater so, hoping to trick the gang into revealing the location, Val plants a phony story in her newspaper that she has discovered a cache of currency off the California coast. After kidnapping Val and delivering her to Marvin, the divers prepare to check the cave. Police diving units, as well as harbor patrol personnel are standing by when Marvin, with Val as his prisoner, drives to a pier to wait for sunrise. After Mike and Brad observe Marvin's three divers enter the water, Mike dispatches five police frogmen to follow them. When Brad approaches Marvin's car, Val bites her captor and escapes while he and Brad fight for possession of Marvin's knife. Eventually, Brad knocks Marvin into the water and the police arrest him. After retrieving the cases, Marvin's men are surprised by the police divers and, during an underwater fight, two of them are shot with spear guns. On the beach, with the money recovered and Val assured of a good story, Brad again proposes and this time Val accepts.

== Cast ==
- Mara Corday as Valerie Hudson
- Pat Conway as Lt. Brad Chase
- Florence Marly as Leila Graham
- Dan Seymour as Lt. Mike Travis
- Ralph Clanton as Sam Marvin
- Myron Healey as Eric 'Swede' Nelson
- Lewis Charles as Phil Barry
- Jerry Eskow as Dwyer
- Dehl Berti as Joe
- Sue George as Susie
- Mickey Simpson as Frank Larkin
- Mike Mason as Don Carson
