= Ralph Clanton =

American actor (1914–2002)

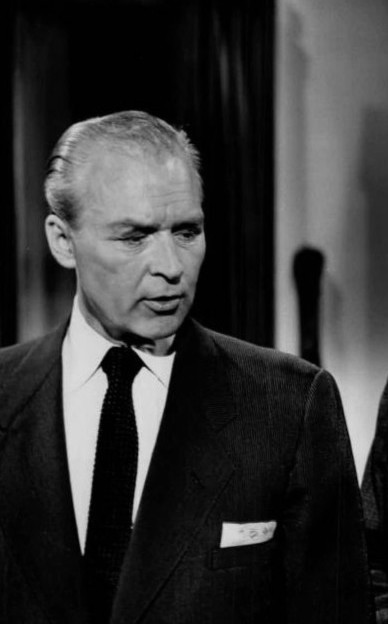
- Clanton in 1957
- Born: Ralph Woodward Clanton; September 11, 1914; Fresno, California, U.S.
- Died: December 29, 2002 (aged 88); Staten Island, New York, U.S.
- Occupation: Actor
- Years active: 1949–1983

Ralph Woodward Clanton (September 11, 1914 – December 29, 2002) was an American character actor of film, stage, and television. His most seen performance was Comte De Guiche in the 1950 film Cyrano de Bergerac, the first sound version in English of Edmond Rostand's play, and the film for which José Ferrer won his only Academy Award for Best Actor. Besides Ferrer as Cyrano, Clanton was the only holdover from the cast of the 1946 Broadway revival of the play, and would play the role of De Guiche opposite him once more, in a New York City Center production in 1953.

== Career ==
After acting as the narrator in Canadian Pacific (1949), he was the American lead in the British war film They Were Not Divided.(1950).

Clanton was featured in seven episodes of Alfred Hitchcock's television show, as well as making several appearances on the Hallmark Hall of Fame. In 1976, he played the role of George Washington in a PBS television production of Sidney Kingsley's drama The Patriots. He also played Jasper Delaney on the TV soap operas, Another World and its spinoff Somerset.

He played Mr. Ingram in the sci-fi thriller The 27th Day.

He played guest star roles on numerous television series, such as four episodes of Perry Mason, including the role of Mervyn Aldritch in the premiere episode, "The Case of the Restless Redhead" in 1957, murder victim Charles Brewster in "The Case of the Fancy Figures" in 1958 and Karl Colby in "The Case of the Stand-in Sister" in 1962. In addition, he appeared on Broadway in the role of Claude Nau in Robert Bolt's Vivat! Vivat Regina!, as well as in several Shakespeare productions. One of his last roles was a bit part in the film Trading Places (1983).

In a playbill for the 1946 revival of Cyrano de Bergerac he is listed as a direct descendant of members of the infamous Clanton gang, which took part in the Gunfight at the O.K. Corral.

== Partial filmography ==
- Canadian Pacific (1949) - Opening Narrator (voice, uncredited)
- They Were Not Divided (1950) - David Morgan
- Cyrano de Bergerac (1950) - Antoine Comte de Guiche
- San Antone (1953) - Narrator (uncredited)
- New York Confidential (1955) - Narrator (uncredited)
- The Vagabond King (1956) - Duke of Anjou (uncredited)
- Hot Cars (1956) - Arthur Markel
- Alfred Hitchcock Presents (1956) (Season 1 Episode 31: "The Gentleman From America") - Sir Stephen Hurstwood
- Alfred Hitchcock Presents (1956) (Season 1 Episode 35: "The Legacy") - Randolph Burnside
- Alfred Hitchcock Presents (1957) (Season 2 Episode 20: "Malice Domestic") - Perry Harrison
- Pharaoh's Curse (1957) - Colonel Cross
- Johnny Tremain (1957) - General Gage
- The 27th Day (1957) - Mr. Ingram
- The Midnight Story (1957) - Trailer Narrator (voice, uncredited)
- No Time to Be Young (1957) - Mr. Parner (uncredited)
- Undersea Girl (1957) - Sam Marvin
- Alfred Hitchcock Presents (1958) (Season 3 Episode 25: "Flight to the East") - Sir Robert Walton
- Alfred Hitchcock Presents (1958) (Season 3 Episode 35: "Dip in the Pool") - Ship's Purser
- Alfred Hitchcock Presents (1959) (Season 4 Episode 24: "The Avon Emeralds") - Mr. Saunders
- Alfred Hitchcock Presents (1960) (Season 5 Episode 29: "The Hero") - Ship's Purser
- Have Gun, Will Travel (1960) (Season 3 Episode 23: "The Lady on the Wall") - Armand Boucher (art dealer)
- The Absent Minded Professor (1961) - O.J. Turnbull (uncredited)
- Panic in Year Zero! (1962) - Radio Announcer (voice, uncredited)
- They Might Be Giants (1971) - Supermarket Manager
- Trading Places (1983) - Official #1 (final film role)
