= Man from Del Rio =

1956 film by Harry Horner

- Theatrical release poster
- Directed by: Harry Horner
- Screenplay by: Richard Carr
- Produced by: Robert L. Jacks
- Starring: Anthony Quinn; Katy Jurado; Peter Whitney; Douglas Fowley; John Larch; Whit Bissell; Douglas Spencer
- Cinematography: Stanley Cortez
- Edited by: Robert Golden
- Music by: Fred Steiner
- Production company: Robert L. Jacks Productions
- Distributed by: United Artists
- Release date: October 30, 1956
- Running time: 82 minutes
- Country: United States
- Language: English

Man from Del Rio is a 1956 Western film directed by Harry Horner and written by Richard Carr. Released on October 30, 1956, by United Artists, the film stars Anthony Quinn, Katy Jurado, Peter Whitney, Douglas Fowley, John Larch, Whit Bissell, and Douglas Spencer.

== Plot ==
Dave Robles is a gunfighter from Mexico who beats two other gunfighters in a duel in an American border town, and he is hired as the new sheriff. His popularity with the lower elements of society quickly fades away, and the rich begin to despise him.

As Dave undertakes his law enforcement duties, he comes into conflict with wealthy businessman Ed Bannister, who hires a string of gunmen to assassinate the sheriff. Dave defeats all of his would-be killers. One night, Dave and Bannister confront each other in a brutal fistfight. Dave triumphs and knocks Bannister unconscious, but breaks his right arm in the process. Dave and Doc Adams work to hide his condition while the arm mends over the following weeks.

Sometime later, a young gunfighter seeking to make a name for himself arrives and tries to provoke Dave into a duel. Dave subdues the challenger, but strains his arm in the struggle. Drunkard Breezy Morgan eavesdrops on the sheriff's subsequent visit with Doc Adams and learns of his weakness, then sells the information to Bannister, who publicly demands that Dave either duel him or leave town. Disregarding the pleas of love interest Estella to avoid risking his life, Dave resolves to face Bannister, and removes his bandages to bluff that his ability to draw and shoot is unimpaired. Upon seeing Dave approach without any trepidation, Bannister loses his nerve and backs down, allowing Dave to seize his weapon peacefully, much to the relief of the onlooking townspeople.

== Cast ==
- Anthony Quinn as Dave Robles
- Katy Jurado as Estella
- Peter Whitney as Ed Bannister
- Douglas Fowley as Doc Adams
- John Larch as Bill Dawson
- Whit Bissell as Breezy Morgan
- Douglas Spencer as Sheriff Jack Tillman
- Guinn "Big Boy" Williams as Fred Jasper

== Reception ==
Reviewing the film in 2017, Mark Franklin writes:

A strong performance by Quinn in the lead role and some unusual touches wind up making this a serviceable Western.

Among those unique touches: Bannister has a spinning wheel to which he attaches playing cards for each fast gun he'd like to hire. As those fast guns meet their maker, he plucks their cards off the wheel.
