= Park Avenue Beat =

Theme music for the CBS show Perry Mason

"Park Avenue Beat", also known as the "Perry Mason Theme", was the theme music for the 1957–1966 CBS television drama Perry Mason. It is one of the best-known works by composer Fred Steiner, although he did not receive credit for the theme until near the end of the series' run.

CBS executives had wanted the theme music to convey the suaveness, sophistication, and toughness that they felt were the fundamental aspects of Perry Mason's character, as well as his dealing with criminals and crime. According to Steiner:

Historically, you associate jazz with the seamy side of life. [In 1957], rhythm and blues was the big thing. That rhythm just seemed like what I was looking for: a contemporary beat for that side of him, and yet the symphonic sound to represent him as the kind of guy who goes to the opera. It sounds easy now, but I must have gone through four or five different versions.

The original version of the theme music was recorded in Mexico, which was standard practice at the time. Steiner also composed a number of variations on the theme, as well as stock music, for use as incidental music in the series.

"Park Avenue Beat" was reused in the NBC series of Perry Mason television films starring the surviving original cast members. (Note: The San Francisco Examiner incorrectly credits Bernard Herrmann as co-composer of "Park Avenue Beat.")

In 2001, "Park Avenue Beat" topped a Knight Ridder top 10 list of television themes.
