= Paul Drake =

Fictional private detective in the Perry Mason novels and TV series

- Perry Mason character
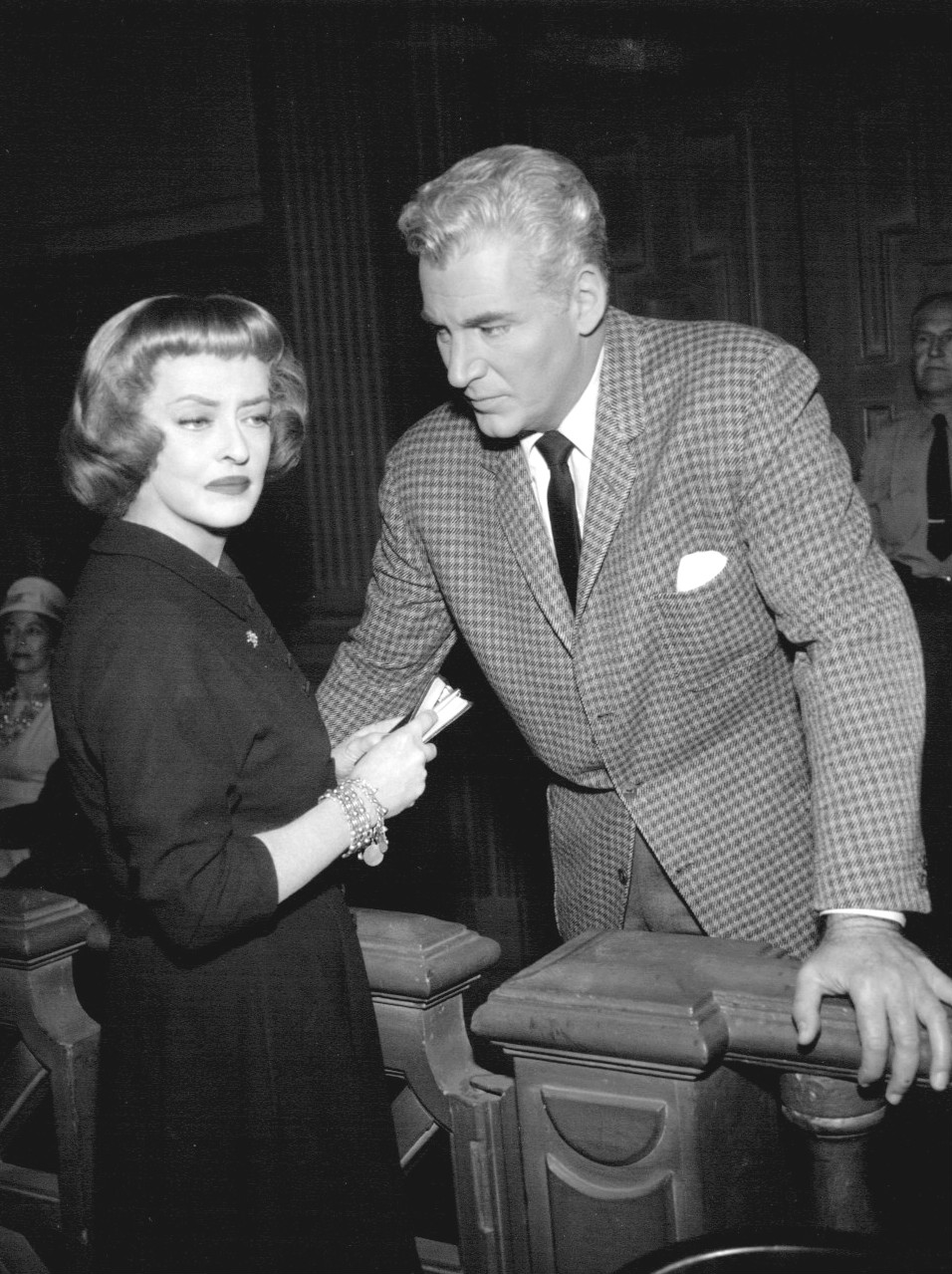
- William Hopper as Paul Drake in the CBS-TV series Perry Mason, with guest star Bette Davis (1963)
- First appearance: The Case of the Velvet Claws (1933)
- Created by: Erle Stanley Gardner
- Portrayed by: Allen Jenkins; Eddie Acuff; Garry Owen; Joseph Crehan; William Hopper; Albert Stratton; Chris Chalk

In-universe information
- Gender: Male
- Occupation: Private detective
- Children: Paul Drake Jr. (son)
- Nationality: American

Paul Drake is a fictional private detective in the Perry Mason series of murder mystery novels by Erle Stanley Gardner. Drake is described as tall and slouching, undistinguished (which suits his profession), and frequently wearing an expression of droll humor. He often smoked cigarettes especially when he had a subject of interest under surveillance. He is friends and right-hand man to Mason, a highly successful criminal defense lawyer in Los Angeles.

== Novels ==
Drake is frequently described as "lanky" and slightly "fish-faced" or "pop-eyed". In talking to Mason, he generally likes to slouch in an armchair with his back over one arm and his legs over the other. The conversations often include complaints about his indigestion from living on cheap hamburgers and bad coffee when working for Mason. His appearance and attitude are deceptive, however: he is personally dedicated, and physically tough in a fight.

== Films ==
Allen Jenkins played a variation on the Paul Drake character, referred to as Spudsy Drake, in two 1935 films based on Gardner novels, The Case of the Curious Bride and The Case of the Lucky Legs.

Eddie Acuff took over the Spudsy role in the 1936 film The Case of the Velvet Claws.

Garry Owen played the investigator, now known simply as Paul Drake, in 1936's The Case of the Black Cat, and Joseph Crehan took over in 1937's The Case of the Stuttering Bishop.

== Television ==
In 1957, the CBS television network launched a Perry Mason series based on Gardner's characters, which ran until 1966. William Hopper auditioned for both the Mason and Drake roles. (Note: Kinescopes of Hopper's audition as Perry Mason, along with Raymond Burr's auditions for Hamilton Burger and Mason, were included as special features on the 2008 "50th Anniversary Edition" Perry Mason DVD set.) "He was perfect as Drake, and we got him," recalled executive producer Gail Patrick Jackson.

"Paul Drake in the Erle Stanley Gardner books was an entirely different character," Hopper said in 1962. "I play him my way. Now I'm amused to read Gardner's new books. Paul Drake now comes out like me!"

"Just as Raymond Burr will always be Perry Mason, Bill Hopper will always be Paul Drake," wrote Brian Kelleher and Diana Merrill in their chronicle of the TV series. "He defined the role."

A running gag on the series is that although Paul Drake is a "wolf" who dates every woman he can, the only woman he does not date is Della Street whom he always respectfully refers to as "Hi Beautiful" - in deference to the romantic chemistry displayed between Perry and Della.

In the short-lived 1973–74 revival, The New Perry Mason, Paul Drake was played by Albert Stratton.

In the successful series of Perry Mason television films that began in 1985, the Paul Drake character was part of the backstory: his son Paul Jr. served as Mason's private investigator in the first nine films. Drake's son was played by William Katt, the real-life son of Barbara Hale, who played Della Street both in the TV series and the TV movies.

In HBO's 2020 Perry Mason reimagining, Paul Drake is African-American, starting the series as an LAPD uniformed police officer. He is portrayed by actor Chris Chalk.
