= Rudy Behlmer =

American film historian and writer (1926–2019)

- Born: October 13, 1926; San Francisco, California, U.S.
- Died: September 27, 2019 (aged 92); Los Angeles, California, U.S.
- Occupations: Author, film historian
- Spouses: Sandra Lee Wightman (m. 1959; div. 1966) Stacey Behlmer (m. 1992)
- Children: 1
- Writing career
- Subject: Film
- Notable work: Memo from David O. Selznick (1972)

Rudolph Herman Behlmer (October 13, 1926 – September 27, 2019) was an American film historian and writer. Born and raised in San Francisco, California, he was an expert in the history and evolution of the motion picture industry.

== Biography ==
Behlmer began his career with KLAC-TV in Hollywood as a stage manager. At the beginning of the 1960s, Behlmer started researching and writing articles and books on various aspects of film history. His first major success was Memo from David O. Selznick (1972), on the producer of Gone with the Wind (1939) and Rebecca) (1940). It was followed by many other books about the Golden Age of Hollywood as well as numerous articles for newspapers and magazines, and home video and film music record booklets. He died on September 27, 2019, at the age of 92.

== Bibliography ==
- Jungle Tales of the Cinema (1960)
- The Films of Errol Flynn (1969), with Tony Thomas and Clifford McCarty
- Memo from David O. Selznick (1972)
- Hollywood's Hollywood: The Movies About the Movies (1975) with Tony Thomas
- America's Favorite Movies: Behind the Scenes (1982)
- Inside Warner Bros. (1935-1951) (1985)
- Behind the Scenes: The Making Of... (1990)
- W. S. Van Dyke's Journal: White Shadows in the South Seas (1927-1928) (1996), edited and annotated
- Henry Hathaway (2001)
- Shoot the Rehearsal! Behind the Scenes with Assistant Director Reggie Callow (2010)

== Audio commentaries ==
- Adventures of Don Juan (1948), with director Vincent Sherman
- The Adventures of Robin Hood (1938), two: for The Criterion Collection 1988/1990 LaserDiscs, and Warner Bros. 2003 DVD (and subsequent releases)
- The Black Pirate (1926)
- The Black Swan (1942), with actress Maureen O'Hara
- Captain from Castile (1947), with film historians Jon Burlingame and Nick Redman
- Casablanca (1942)
- Chang (1927)
- Frankenstein (1931)
- Gone with the Wind (1939)
- Gunga Din (1939)
- How the West Was Won (1962), with filmmaker David Strohmaier, director of Cinerama Inc., John Sittig, music historian Jon Burlingame and stuntman Loren Janes
- The Invisible Man (1933)
- Laura (1944)
- Notorious (1946)
- Singin' in the Rain (1942), with actors Debbie Reynolds, Donald O'Connor, Cyd Charisse and Kathleen Freeman, co-director Stanley Donen, screenwriters Betty Comden and Adolph Green and filmmaker Baz Luhrmann
- A Streetcar Named Desire (1951), with actor Karl Malden and film historian Jeff Young
- Twelve O'Clock High (1949), with film historians Jon Burlingame and Nick Redman
- 20,000 Leagues Under the Sea (1954), with director Richard Fleischer
- Yankee Doodle Dandy (1942)
