= Fred Steiner =

American composer, conductor, orchestrator, film historian and arranger

Background information
- Born: February 24, 1923; New York City, U.S.
- Died: June 23, 2011 (aged 88) Ajijic, Jalisco, Mexico
- Education: Oberlin Conservatory of Music
- Occupations: Composer, conductor, orchestrator, film historian
- Spouse: Shirley Laura Steiner (née Lipkin)

Frederick Steiner (February 24, 1923 – June 23, 2011) was an American composer, conductor, orchestrator, film historian and arranger for television, radio and film. Steiner wrote the theme music for The Rocky and Bullwinkle Show and Perry Mason. While Alexander Courage composed the theme music for the original Star Trek TV series (TOS), Steiner's significant contributions to the franchise included composing more of the incidental music for TOS than any other composer, as well as scoring or conducting the music for 29 of the show's 79 episodes. Steiner also composed and orchestrated additional music for Star Trek: The Motion Picture (1979), was part of the team of composers for the 1985 film The Color Purple, which received an Oscar nomination, and was an uncredited composer for Return of the Jedi.

Steiner was most active in television series during the 1950s and 1960s. His numerous composition credits included music for Hogan's Heroes, Have Gun – Will Travel, The Twilight Zone, Gunsmoke, and Rawhide.

== Early life ==
Steiner was born in New York City, the son of the Hungarian-born composer and violinist George Steiner, a pupil of Zoltán Kodály. Steiner was Jewish. He began playing the piano at age six, and at age 13 had expanded his music studies to include the cello and music theory. Steiner was considered a Wunderkind and, from a very early age, had a desire to do the same work his father did: composing film and radio scores. After graduating from Townsend Harris High School he accepted a scholarship to the Oberlin Conservatory of Music where he studied with composer Normand Lockwood. He received his degree in music composition from Oberlin in 1943.

== Radio ==
Straight out of college, Steiner began composing and arranging scores for New York-based radio broadcasts. These early credits included Suspense and CBS Radio Workshop. Steiner also composed for several wartime propaganda shorts made to sell war bonds. The most pivotal point in his early career came when he was introduced to Van Cleave in the early 1940s by his father, who at the time was playing in Cleave's orchestra. When Steiner was later employed as an orchestrator for various later radio broadcasts, he was inexperienced but studied Van Cleave closely to develop his own skills. In 1945 Steiner was appointed the first music director of This is Your FBI, composing and arranging for 47 episodes of the radio crime drama. With the decline of the radio industry, Steiner decided to shift his attention to television. He moved west to Los Angeles in 1947.

== Television ==
Steiner wrote for a number of television series, including many episodes of the original Star Trek series. An article he wrote for the Library of Congress, "Music for Star Trek: Scoring a Television Show in the Sixties", outlines and defines the contributions of all the original underscore composers of this series.

Perhaps the best-known of Steiner's works, "Park Avenue Beat", is the Perry Mason TV theme. It was used from 1957 to 1966 for the original Perry Mason series and was re-recorded by Dick DeBenedictis for the subsequent made-for-TV movies in 1985. The tune was covered by the Blues Brothers for the soundtrack of the 1998 film Blues Brothers 2000. Steiner said he wrote such a jazzy theme because he envisioned lawyer-sleuth Mason as a flamboyant, film noir type often out on the town, but Mason as portrayed in the series was a somewhat reserved character seen mostly in his office or in court.

Steiner also composed the main theme to The Bullwinkle Show and Follow That Man and contributed music to episodes of Lost in Space, The Twilight Zone, and Amazing Stories.

== Feature film work ==
His feature film work included original scores to films such as Run for the Sun (1956), Time Limit (1957), Man from Del Rio (1956), Della (1964), Hercules and the Princess of Troy (1965), First to Fight (1967), Carter's Army (1970), Heatwave! (1974) and The Sea Gypsies (1978), as well as orchestration/adaptation (sometimes uncredited) for other composers including The Man with the Golden Arm (1956), The Greatest Story Ever Told (1965), and Star Trek: The Motion Picture (1979).

His Academy Award nomination for "Best Music, Original Score" was for The Color Purple (1985). It was a shared nomination with Quincy Jones, Jeremy Lubbock, Rod Temperton, Caiphus Semenya, Andraé Crouch, Chris Boardman, Jorge Calandrelli, Joel Rosenbaum, Jack Hayes, Jerry Hey, and Randy Kerber.

== Musicological work ==
Steiner received a doctorate in musicology from the University of Southern California in 1981. His dissertation was about the early career of film composer Alfred Newman. Prior to Steiner's thesis, there existed little interest in the academic study of film music. Steiner became one of the first to bring musicology and film perspective together. Scholarly articles on film music appear in The Cue Sheet, Film Music Quarterly and the Quarterly Journal of the Library of Congress.

== Personal life and death ==
Fred Steiner died on June 23, 2011, at his home in Ajijic, Jalisco, Mexico, after suffering a stroke at the age of 88. He was survived by his wife of 64 years, Shirley Laura Steiner, two daughters including singer-songwriter Wendy Waldman, and his sister.

== Filmography ==
=== Radio compositions ===
- Adventures of Philip Marlowe (1947)
- Arkansas Traveler (1946)
- The Borden Show (1945)
- Candide (1953)
- The CBS Radio Workshop (1940s)
- Hallmark Playhouse (1940s)
- Radio Reader's Digest (1944-1945)

=== Television ===
- Amazing Stories
- Andy Griffith Show (1961-1965)
- Beany and Cecil (1962)
- The Big Valley (1965)
- Blood Feud (1983)
- Bonanza (1971)
- Boots and Saddles
- Bracken's World
- Buick-Electra Playhouse
- Cain's Hundred (1960-1962)
- The Court of Last Resort
- Daniel Boone (1964-1970)
- The Danny Thomas Show
- Death of a Salesman
- Dennis the Menace
- The Detectives
- Desilu Playhouse
- The Dick Powell Show
- Dynasty
- Ensign O'Toole
- Family Flight
- Father Knows Best
- From Here to Eternity
- General Electric Theater
- The Ghost & Mrs. Muir
- Gilligan's Island (1964)
- Gomer Pyle, U.S.M.C.
- The Great Adventure
- The Guns of Will Sonnett (1967-1969)
- Gunsmoke (1961-1979)
- Have Gun Will Travel (1961-1963)
- Hawaii Five-O (1978-1979)
- Hazel
- Hec Ramsey
- Hogan's Heroes
- Honey West
- Hotel de Paree
- I Spy
- Judd for the Defense
- Kraft Television Theatre
- Lancer

- Life with Luigi
- The Lloyd Bridges Show
- The Lone Ranger
- The Loner
- The Long, Hot Summer
- Lost in Space
- The Man from Blackhawk
- The Man from U.N.C.L.E
- Mannix
- The Millionaire
- My Favorite Husband
- My Friend Irma
- Navy Log
- O'Hara, U.S. Treasury
- Perry Mason
- Pete and Gladys
- Peyton Place
- Playhouse 90
- Police Woman
- Rawhide
- Rescue 8
- The Richard Boone Show
- Riverboat
- The Rocky and Bullwinkle Show (1961)
- Saints and Sinners
- Star Trek: The Next Generation
- Star Trek: The Original Series
- The Streets of San Francisco
- The Tab Hunter Show
- Target: The Corruptors
- The Texan
- Tightrope
- Tiny Toon Adventures (1990-1992)
- Twelve O'Clock High
- The Twilight Zone (1960-1963)
- The Untouchables (1962)
- Valentine's Day (1964)
- Wake Me When the War is Over (1969)
- Where's Raymond?
- The Wild Wild West
- Zane Grey Theatre

=== Movies ===
- Cloak & Dagger
- The Color Purple
- The Deadly Trackers
- First to Fight
- Gremlins 2: The New Batch
- Herbie Goes Bananas
- Man from Del Rio
- Night Terror
- Run for the Sun
- The Sea Gypsies
- The St. Valentine's Day Massacre
- Time Limit

== See also ==
- The Film Music Society
