= Perry Mason bibliography =

The following is a list of the Perry Mason novels and short stories by Erle Stanley Gardner, published from 1933 to 1973.

Many Perry Mason novels were first published in magazines, most often The Saturday Evening Post, some with different titles. Sixteen appeared in the Toronto Star Weekly in condensed form. All books were first published by William Morrow and Company, New York. Most were published simultaneously in Toronto.

Six of the novels were adapted for a series of Perry Mason films produced in the 1930s. Many of the novels and short stories were adapted for the CBS television series Perry Mason (1957–1966); details are available at the list of episodes for the TV series.

The Perry Mason series ranks third in the top ten best selling book series, with sales of 300 million. R. L. Stine's Goosebumps series is ranked second, with over 400 million; J. K. Rowling's Harry Potter series is first, with over 500 million.

== Novels ==
The Case of the Velvet Claws (1933), first edition

The Case of the Howling Dog (1934), first edition

=== 1930s ===
1. The Case of the Velvet Claws (1933)
  William Morrow and Company, March 1933 (Note: The bibliography in Dorothy B. Hughes' biography of Gardner was compiled by Ruth "Honey" Moore, the youngest of the three Walter sisters who were Gardner's longtime secretaries.)
  In the first Perry Mason mystery, we meet Perry, Della Street and detective Paul Drake for the first time. District Attorney Hamilton Burger and Lieutenant Arthur Tragg do not appear in this story. There is no courtroom scene in the entire novel, which is routine in the later books. The plot revolves around a spoiled woman, who calls herself "Eva Griffin". She comes to Mason claiming that she is being blackmailed by her powerful husband. She wants to keep the news of her affairs secret from him and seeks help from Mason. Meanwhile, she is accused of murder and, in turn, puts the blame on Mason himself. But Perry avoids being double-crossed and fights to free her from the charges.
2. The Case of the Sulky Girl (1933)
  William Morrow and Company, September 1933
  A bratty heiress wants to keep the news of a man in her life a secret from the guardian who controls her purse strings. Then, when there is a murder, that same man is accused.
3. The Case of the Lucky Legs (1934)
  William Morrow and Company, February 1934
  Perry tries to represent a woman taken in by a con man. Other women show up conned by the same man, and their boyfriends show up, and suddenly there is a death. A mistake at the murder scene dogs Perry, as he tries to figure out what is going on before something happens to him...
4. The Case of the Howling Dog (1934)
  Serialized in Liberty Magazine, January 13 – March 17, 1934; William Morrow and Company, June 1934
  When a potential client wants to see Mason about a howling dog and a will, the attorney is uninterested. He does not enjoy drafting wills, and wonders if the man should not see a veterinarian. However, the man's next question, whether a will is legal if the person who made it had been executed for murder, immediately piques Mason's interest. He finds, in addition to the will and the dog, a man who had run away with the wife of another, and a sexy housekeeper. The Hollywood movie of this name is considered the best big screen adaptation of a Perry Mason book.
5. The Case of the Curious Bride (1934)
  Serialized in Liberty Magazine, July 7 – September 15, 1934; William Morrow and Company, November 1934
  A woman claiming not to be a bride consults Mason about her "friend" whose husband, long thought to have died in a plane crash, turns up alive.
6. The Case of the Counterfeit Eye (1935)
  William Morrow and Company, April 1935
  Peter Brunold has a bloodshot glass eye to use the "morning after." It is distinctive, closely identified with him, and thus a handicap when a corpse is found clutching a bloodshot glass eye. Later, another corpse is found, with another bloodshot glass eye in hand. But Mason is in almost as much jeopardy as his client, as his fingerprints have been found on one of the alleged murder weapons. This is the first novel in which District Attorney Hamilton Burger appears.
7. The Case of the Caretaker's Cat (1935)
  Serialized in Liberty Magazine, June 15 – August 17, 1935; William Morrow and Company, September 1935
  After his employer dies in a fire, a caretaker hires Mason to allow him to keep his cat against the wishes of the men who inherit. When the caretaker is killed, Mason defends the man accused of his murder.
8. The Case of the Sleepwalker's Niece (1936)
  William Morrow and Company, March 1936
  When two men change bedrooms at a house party, everyone thinks that the sleepwalker with the carving knife killed the wrong man. This is not the first novel in which Perry kisses Della Street in the office. Della and Perry first kissed in The Case of the Velvet Claws.
9. The Case of the Stuttering Bishop (1936)
  William Morrow and Company, September 1936
  Mason gets a telephone call from a man who identifies himself as Anglican Bishop William Mallory, recently returned from many years in Australia, and tells Mason that he will testify on the behalf of Mason's client, if Mason can find him. But Mason observes that a bishop who has delivered many sermons is unlikely to stutter.
10. The Case of the Dangerous Dowager (1937)
  William Morrow and Company, April 1937
  Mason is hired to retrieve a spoiled granddaughter's gambling IOUs by a wealthy cigar-smoking dowager. A murder aboard a gambling ship is beyond the twelve-mile limit.
11. The Case of the Lame Canary (1937)
  Serialized in The Saturday Evening Post, May 29 – July 17, 1937; William Morrow and Company, September 1937
  A snoopy neighbor and a canary whose claws have been cut too short give the clues to an illicit affair and a murder.
12. The Case of the Substitute Face (1938)
  William Morrow and Company, April 1938
  During a dark and stormy night aboard ship, a man goes missing. A portrait photograph is mysteriously changed out of a frame. Mason must solve the mystery to save a life.
13. The Case of the Shoplifter's Shoe (1938)
  William Morrow and Company, September 1938
  Mason defends an elderly woman who claims to have no memory of shooting a man, but he needs to know why she would go shoplifting when she has plenty of money in her purse.
14. The Case of the Perjured Parrot (1939)
  William Morrow and Company, February 1939
  One of Perry Mason's trademarks is his ability, in court, to switch the physical evidence in a case. He generally does this with guns or bullets, and it confuses the jury, to his client's advantage. In this case, Perry offers a coroner's inquest two parrots, one of which swore like a muleskinner and was found near the body of a millionaire hermit who had been murdered.
  Jacques Barzun and Wendell Hertig Taylor, A Catalogue of Crime: "This early Perry Mason is uncommonly full of detection, and the games played in it with parrots do not detract from plausibility. Denouement not huddled—all in all, a model in his special genre."
15. The Case of the Rolling Bones (1939)
  William Morrow and Company, November 1939
  A murder during the Alaskan Gold Rush has ramifications that lead to murder in the present day. This is the first novel for Mason's intrepid switchboard operator, Gertie.

=== 1940s ===
16. The Case of the Baited Hook (1940)
  William Morrow and Company, March 1940
  Mason is given a third of a $10,000 bill to represent a masked woman in the future. It takes him almost until the murder trial to find out which cheating woman is his client.
17. The Case of the Silent Partner (1940)
  William Morrow and Company, November 1940
  A dynamic young businesswoman is in danger of losing control of her flower shop, and someone sends poisoned bonbons to a nightclub hostess. Mason must reacquire some stock and defend the businesswoman. This novel is the first to feature Lt. Arthur Tragg, who was introduced as a replacement for Sgt. Holcomb. Gardner felt that Tragg, though plenty tough and smart, had a smoother approach than the rough-and-ready Holcomb character, and gave the police a better image. Holcomb would continue to appear sometimes as a secondary character, though.
18. The Case of the Haunted Husband (1941)
  William Morrow and Company, February 1941
  A cigarette girl in San Francisco leaves her job and the city abruptly, and hitchhikes to Los Angeles. She gets in a car wreck with a would-be Romeo, waking up in the hospital to find herself charged with his death. (Note: Near the end, Mason shares, in the words of Paul Drake, "a five minute talk on the philosophy of life and death I'll never forget.")
19. The Case of the Empty Tin (1941)
  William Morrow and Company, October 1941
  A snoopy spinster discovers the passing of coded messages sealed into empty tins, but it is someone else who is killed in the basement.
20. The Case of the Drowning Duck (1942)
  William Morrow and Company, May 1942
  Perry Mason and Della Street are on a vacation in Palm Springs when a wealthy businessman asks for advice about his daughter's boyfriend, a chemist who drowns ducks and becomes a murder suspect.
21. The Case of the Careless Kitten (1942)
  Serialized in The Saturday Evening Post, May 23 – July 11, 1942; William Morrow and Company, September 1942
  Mason defends Della Street, who is accused of helping a material witness or possible murder suspect vanish from a crime scene. Key clues in the murder case are the behavior of a greedy kitten and the impersonation of an elderly crippled woman.
22. The Case of the Buried Clock (1943)
  William Morrow and Company, May 1943
  A returning war veteran stumbles across a buried clock that is apparently keeping sidereal time. A murder victim is found in a rural area where, it seems, all the neighbors go out for walks at night.
23. The Case of the Drowsy Mosquito (1943)
  William Morrow and Company, September 1943
  A wealthy prospector is camping in his own back yard, someone tries to poison Perry and Della, Paul Drake poses as a drunken prospector, and the clue to the murder is the sound of a mosquito flying in lazy circles.
24. The Case of the Crooked Candle (1944)
  William Morrow and Company, May 1944
  A key element in a complicated story of a body found on a beached boat is a candle that stands at a steep angle.
  Jacques Barzun and Wendell Hertig Taylor, A Catalogue of Crime: "The details of the boat grounded at low tide with a corpse in the cabin are superbly handled, and the rest of the story—motives and characters—is both believable and reasonably straightforward; … It is an absolutely first-rate job."
25. The Case of the Black-Eyed Blonde (1944)
  William Morrow and Company, November 1944
  A beautiful blonde gets a fist in the eye from her employer's son, and Mason must defend her when her roommate is murdered.
26. The Case of the Golddigger's Purse (1945)
  William Morrow and Company, May 1945
  Mason is surprised to hear that someone wants to consult him about a sick goldfish, and the case also concerns a crooked partner, a secret formula, and a gold-digging ingenue accused of murder.
27. The Case of the Half-Wakened Wife (1945)
  William Morrow and Company, September 1945
  A shady promoter is blocking the sale of a valuable island when he comes up with an oil lease, but when he is murdered on a pleasure cruise, it is his wife who stands trial for murder.
28. The Case of the Borrowed Brunette (1946)
  William Morrow and Company, November 1946
  A young woman is hired to impersonate someone because her measurements and coloring match a very specific list. It is a tricky ploy in a divorce, and it soon leads to a murder charge against her chaperone.
29. The Case of the Fan Dancer's Horse (1947)
  William Morrow and Company, June 1947
  There are two gorgeous fan dancers with the same name, two blood-soaked ostrich fans, a samurai sword, and a horse with a very unusual addition to its saddle.
30. The Case of the Lazy Lover (1947)
  William Morrow and Company, October 1947
  A man tells everyone that his wife has run away with his best friend, who seems to have a strange lack of enthusiasm about the affair. The case leads to murder and a trial that hinges on multiple sets of footprints.
31. The Case of the Lonely Heiress (1948)
  William Morrow and Company, February 1948
  Mason is hired to find the identity of an "heiress" who ran ads in a lonely hearts magazine. Later, he defends the heiress against a murder charge.
32. The Case of the Vagabond Virgin (1948)
  William Morrow and Company, July 1948
  A man picks up an innocent young hitchhiker and gets into even more trouble when his partner is found murdered.
  Jacques Barzun and Wendell Hertig Taylor, A Catalogue of Crime: "Despite the fact that compelling evidence of virginity is not offered, the lady vagabond is well done, and the plot is better-than-average Gardner; indeed, it is surprisingly good when one considers the deluge that had already gone over the dam by 1948."
33. The Case of the Dubious Bridegroom (1949)
  William Morrow and Company, February 1949
  First Mason gets his face slapped by a beautiful burglar in his office building, then a Tijuana wedding trip leads to a murder.
34. The Case of the Cautious Coquette (1949)
  William Morrow and Company, May 1949
  At the behest of Mason, who is representing a young man hit by a car, Paul Drake places an ad in the paper asking for witnesses to the hit and run. To Mason's astonishment, two different drivers are identified, one by a mysterious letter enclosing a key. The 1949 first edition has just this story. Morrow issued a later hardcover edition marked "Book Club Edition" in a taller format which included two Mason short stories: The Case of the Crying Swallow and The Case of the Crimson Kiss. This later edition has a jacket that includes a blurb for the two included stories, while the true first edition jacket does not.

=== 1950s ===
35. The Case of the Negligent Nymph (1950)
  Serialized in Collier's, September 17 – October 22, 1949; William Morrow and Company, January 1950
  A young woman swims to Mason's canoe to escape a vicious watchdog, then is accused of jewel theft and murder. But it is the dog who provides the key to the murder.
36. The Case of the One-Eyed Witness (1950)
  William Morrow and Company, November 1950
  When a mysterious woman hires Mason over the telephone, he must defend her in a case that involves an adoption racket and her husband's murder. A woman in an eyepatch is a key witness.
37. The Case of the Fiery Fingers (1951)
  William Morrow and Company, May 1951
  Mason defends a woman twice—once on theft charges, and then on murder charges.
38. The Case of the Angry Mourner (1951)
  William Morrow and Company, October 1951
  A playboy is murdered in his lakeside cabin and a mother and daughter, who had both been there, start to suspect each other so call on Perry Mason for help.
39. The Case of the Moth-Eaten Mink (1952)
  William Morrow and Company, April 1952
  A waitress in a favorite restaurant of Mason's runs out in the middle of the lunch rush, leaving behind her moth-eaten mink, and is hit by a car. Later, a message in lipstick helps Mason disprove the murder case against her framed boss. This novel was the basis for the script for the pilot episode of the CBS television series.
40. The Case of the Grinning Gorilla (1952)
  William Morrow and Company, November 1952
  Mason buys the diary of a drowned woman at an auction, and after a murder he finds himself confronted by a hypnotized gorilla.
41. The Case of the Hesitant Hostess (1953)
  William Morrow and Company, April 1953
  A hostess at a nightclub seems determined to convince a jury that Mason's client committed armed robbery, so he goes over her story in painstaking detail on the stand.
42. The Case of the Green-Eyed Sister (1953)
  William Morrow and Company, November 1953
  Mason, hired to protect a family from illegitimate blackmail, ends up defending a woman who the police claim murdered the blackmailer.
  Jacques Barzun and Wendell Hertig Taylor, A Catalogue of Crime: "One of the tightest knit and richest in gimmicks and characters. (Mason's) fiddling with tape recorders is excellent, and the dialogues in and out of court show what can be done with backchat to create drama."
43. The Case of the Fugitive Nurse (1954)
  Serialized in The Saturday Evening Post, September 19 – November 7, 1953; William Morrow and Company, February 1954
  When young Steffanie Malden, recently widowed by the death of her husband, the very successful surgeon Summerfield Malden, consults Mason, she wants the $100,000 her husband and nurse hid from his wife and the IRS in a love nest, but changes priorities when the authorities prosecute her for murder.
44. The Case of the Runaway Corpse (1954)
  William Morrow and Company, June 1954
  Mason defends a woman accused of poisoning her husband--even though witnesses saw the corpse climb out the motel window.
45. The Case of the Restless Redhead (1954)
  Serialized in The Saturday Evening Post, September 11 – October 30, 1954; William Morrow and Company, October 1954
  Mason helps a young defense attorney get an innocent verdict for a woman accused of theft. Later, he defends her in a murder case with a large number of twists. This novel was the basis for the script for the first episode of the television series.
46. The Case of the Glamorous Ghost (1955)
  William Morrow and Company, January 1955
  A scantily-clad woman claims she has amnesia, and cannot remember anything about the jewel smuggling or the murder.
47. The Case of the Sun Bather's Diary (1955)
  Serialized in The Saturday Evening Post, March 5 – April 23, 1955; William Morrow and Company, May 1955
  Mason defends the daughter of a man convicted of armed robbery who first loses her trailer, all her clothes and her diary.
48. The Case of the Nervous Accomplice (1955)
  William Morrow and Company, September 1955
  Mason is hired by a woman whose husband is having an affair to wreck it, then defends her on a murder charge.
49. The Case of the Terrified Typist (1956)
  William Morrow and Company, January 1956
  After a temporary typist who enjoys trick photography has left Mason's office in a tearing hurry, he and Della find some diamonds stuck in chewing gum on the bottom of her desk. Her involvement in a murder trial features an ending unique in the Mason series.This was the only case in the series Gardner wrote where Perry Mason lost the case.
50. The Case of the Demure Defendant (1956)
  Serialized as "The Case of the Missing Poison" in The Saturday Evening Post, December 10, 1955 – January 28, 1956; William Morrow and Company, May 1956
  A woman confesses to murder during a therapy session, and her doctor consults Mason as to the legal ramifications. Later Mason defends the woman in court.
51. The Case of the Gilded Lily (1956)
  William Morrow and Company, September 1956
  Mason defends a man thought to have killed his blackmailer.
52. The Case of the Lucky Loser (1957)
  Serialized in The Saturday Evening Post, September 1 – October 20, 1956; William Morrow and Company, January 1957
  Mason defends a man previously convicted of killing a man with an automobile while intoxicated. When the body is found to have been killed with a gun, Mason argues double jeopardy as a plea, but eventually clears his client of all crimes.
53. The Case of the Screaming Woman (1957)
  William Morrow and Company, May 1957
  Mason defends a woman accused of murdering a doctor running an illegal adoption agency.
54. The Case of the Daring Decoy (1957)
  Serialized as "The Proxy Murder" by the Chicago Tribune-New York News syndicate, September 8 – October 19, 1957; William Morrow and Company, October 1957
  Mason defends a man embroiled in a stock battle who is accused of killing a business rival's secretary. Was the woman in a nightgown with a mudpack on her face trying to keep the gun herself, or palm it off?
55. The Case of the Long-Legged Models (1958)
  Serialized as "The Case of the Dead Man's Daughter" in The Saturday Evening Post, August 10 – September 28, 1957; William Morrow and Company, January 1958
  Mason defends a woman accused of murdering the man who murdered her father, and does so by juggling identical guns until no one knows what is what and involving the car dealer and his newlywed son.
56. The Case of the Foot-Loose Doll (1958)
  Serialized in The Saturday Evening Post, February 1 – March 22, 1958; William Morrow and Company, May 1958
  Mason defends a woman against charges of two murders—she has already stolen $4,000, stabbed a man with an ice pick, and fled a fatal accident, but he is convinced she is innocent of murder.
57. The Case of the Calendar Girl (1958)
  William Morrow and Company, October 1958
  Mason masterfully defends a man accused of murdering a corrupt politician by shoving the blame onto a model. When the model is accused of murder using the evidence Mason uncovered, Perry defends her.
58. The Case of the Deadly Toy (1959)
  Serialized as "The Case of the Greedy Grandpa" in The Saturday Evening Post, October 25 – December 13, 1958; William Morrow and Company, January 1959
  A boy with a toy printing press and a .22 leads Perry Mason to a murder trial where his mother is on trial for the murder of his father, and his wealthy grandfather will do anything to get her convicted.
59. The Case of the Mythical Monkeys (1959)
  Serialized in The Saturday Evening Post, May 2 – June 20, 1959; William Morrow and Company, June 1959
  Gladys Doyle, secretary of underworld moll turned bestselling novelist Mauvis Meade, keeps an appointment in her employer's stead at mountaintop Summit Inn, but gets stuck in the mud on her way back and spends the night with a man who vanishes. A crucial clue is a scarf printed with the three mythical monkeys whose poses say, "Hear no evil, see no evil, speak no evil."
60. The Case of the Singing Skirt (1959)
  William Morrow and Company, September 1959
  Mason's client is framed for theft and fired because of her refusal to assist in cheating a casino patron. Then she is accused of murder, and the gun juggling begins.
  Jacques Barzun and Wendell Hertig Taylor, A Catalogue of Crime: "The court scene is excellent; the characters, though thin as usual, are amply credible; and the pace never flags."

=== 1960s ===
61. The Case of the Waylaid Wolf (1960)
  Serialized in The Saturday Evening Post, September 5 – October 24, 1959; William Morrow and Company, January 1960
  A woman defends herself from date rape by stealing his car. When her would-be rapist is found dead, Mason defends her on the murder charge and does some spectacular misdirection with the evidence.
62. The Case of the Duplicate Daughter (1960)
  Serialized in The Saturday Evening Post, June 4 – July 23, 1960; William Morrow and Company, June 1960
  Perry is unsure which woman, wearing only a nightgown, was running away from a garage that has become the scene of a murder, and as a retainer, he asks for title to all the money found in the garage.
63. The Case of the Shapely Shadow (1960)
  William Morrow and Company, October 1960
  A secretary, convinced her boss is being blackmailed, hires Mason to secure evidence. But when her boss is found murdered, she needs him to defend her on murder charges.
64. The Case of the Spurious Spinster (1961)
  Serialized in The Saturday Evening Post, January 28 – March 11, 1961; William Morrow and Company, March 1961
  A shoebox full of cash and an elderly mine owner who disappears, wheelchair and all, leave a secretary charged with murder.
65. The Case of the Bigamous Spouse (1961)
  Serialized in The Saturday Evening Post, July 15 – August 26, 1961; William Morrow and Company, August 1961
  Gwynn Elston, door-to-door saleswoman, finds herself implicated in the murder of her best friend's new husband.
66. The Case of the Reluctant Model (1962)
  Published as "The Case of the False Feteet" in the Toronto Star Weekly, October 7, 1961; William Morrow and Company, January 1962
  Mason gets involved in a case of slander when an art dealer questions the authenticity of a painting by fictional artist "Phellipe Feteet" (whose backstory closely follows that of American painter Edgar Leeteg). When Mason goes to the apartment of the main witness, all he finds is a very dead body.
67. The Case of the Blonde Bonanza (1962)
  Serialized in the Toronto Star Weekly, April 7–14, 1962; William Morrow and Company, June 1962
  Mason believes it is crazy that someone is paying a beautiful girl $100 a week to put on weight, but she may be a missing heiress—or a murderess. When Mason finds out what is behind it all, he discovers that the scheme is crazy - like a fox.
68. The Case of the Ice-Cold Hands (1962)
  William Morrow and Company, October 1962
  An interesting legal point arises about an embezzler who gambles on the ponies and wins, and an interesting murder trial centers on some trout packed in dry ice.
69. The Case of the Mischievous Doll (1963)
  The Saturday Evening Post, December 8, 1962; William Morrow and Company, February 1963
  Mason is hired to identify a woman based on an appendix scar, as she fears being a look-alike to an heiress may be a setup for her arrest. Mason later defends the heiress on murder charges.
70. The Case of the Stepdaughter's Secret (1963)
  William Morrow and Company, June 1963
  Blackmail leads to murder on a yacht and a cash-filled purse on the bottom of the ocean weighted down with a gun. Paul Drake investigates by driving a speedboat surrounded by bikini-clad beauties who take turns water skiing. Mason comments he picked the wrong business.
71. The Case of the Amorous Aunt (1963)
  William Morrow and Company, September 1963
  After a young woman hires Mason to prevent her aunt from throwing away her money on a con man, he ends up defending the aunt on a charge of murder.
72. The Case of the Daring Divorcee (1964)
  William Morrow and Company, February 1964
  A purse containing thousands of dollars and a twice-fired gun is left in Mason's office, but his potential client has disappeared.
73. The Case of the Phantom Fortune (1964)
  William Morrow and Company, May 1964
  Mason is hired to protect a man's wife from an unknown blackmailer. However, while Mason's ingenious plan to ruin the blackmailer works, he ends up having to defend the man after he is prosecuted for murder.
74. The Case of the Horrified Heirs (1964)
  William Morrow and Company, September 1964
  Mason defends a woman twice; once on drug smuggling charges, and once on murder charges.
75. The Case of the Troubled Trustee (1965)
  William Morrow and Company, February 1965
  Why would a talented investment advisor embezzle a quarter of a million dollars from his client "for her own good?" Mason first advises him, then defends him as the case becomes murder.
76. The Case of the Beautiful Beggar (1965)
  William Morrow and Company, June 1965
  When her wealthy uncle disappears, his niece has no money, except his check for $125,000. Did she poison his Chinese food after she kidnapped him from the asylum?
77. The Case of the Worried Waitress (1966)
  William Morrow and Company, August 1966
  A pretty waitress is accused of stealing $100 from her wealthy aunt's hatbox, and a blind pencil-seller earns enough to come to work in a taxicab.
78. The Case of the Queenly Contestant (1967)
  William Morrow and Company, May 1967
  Mason is hired to stop a news story about an old beauty pageant. Later, he ends up defending the former contestant on murder charges.
79. The Case of the Careless Cupid (1968)
  William Morrow and Company, March 1968
  Mason defends a wealthy widow who is accused of murdering her husband.
80. The Case of the Fabulous Fake (1969)
  William Morrow and Company, November 1969
  Trying to protect her brother, a woman tries to handle the person blackmailing him—only to be implicated in his murder.

=== Posthumous ===
81. The Case of the Fenced-In Woman (1972)
  William Morrow and Company, September 1972
  Mason becomes involved in the bizarre case of a house split right through the living room with a barbed-wire fence—and a body in the pool.
82. The Case of the Postponed Murder (1973)
  William Morrow and Company, 1973
  A young woman asks Mason to find her sister—but what does she really want? And did the corpse sail the yacht away after he was shot?

== Short stories ==
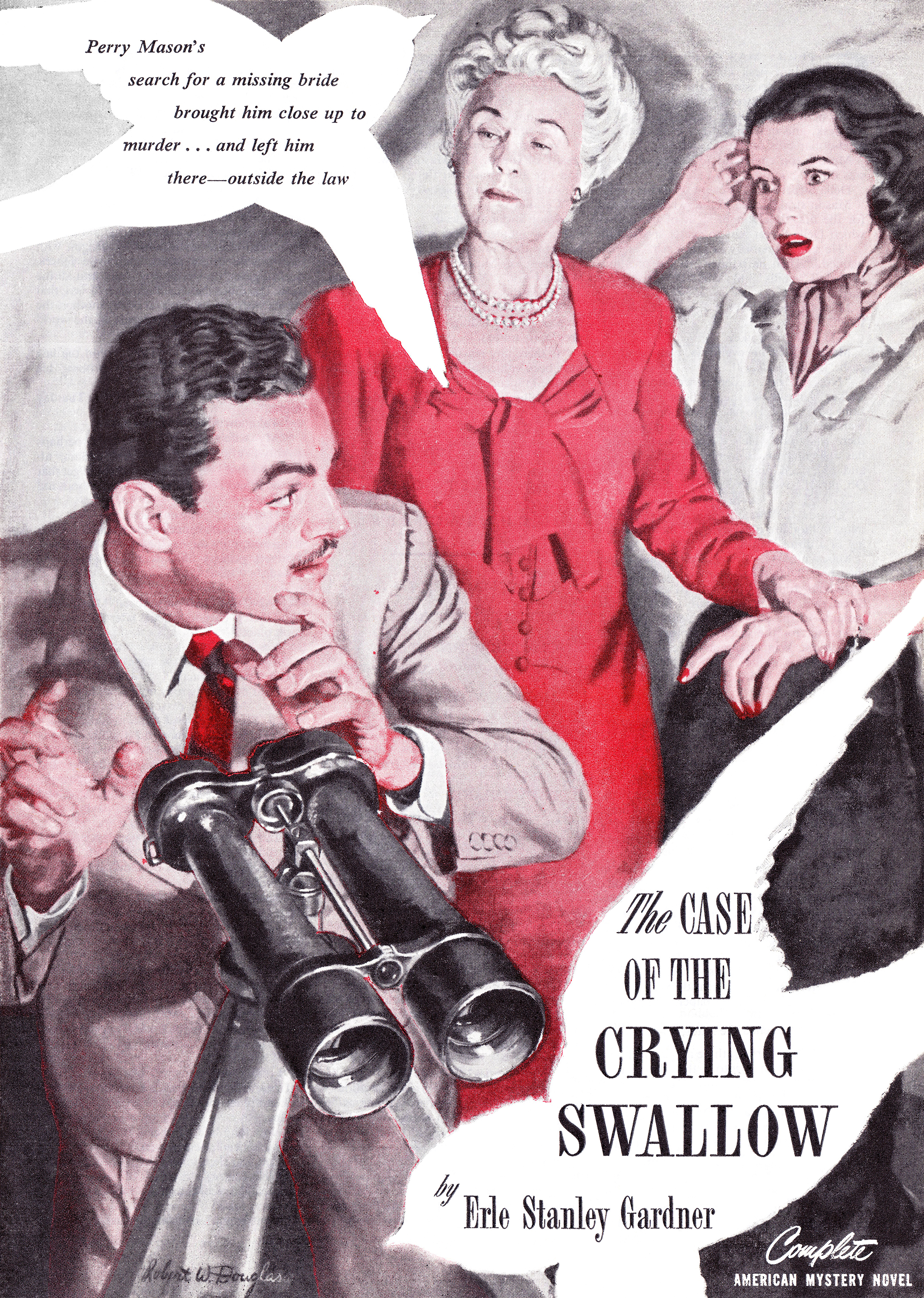
Robert W. Douglas illustrated "The Case of the Crying Swallow" for the August 1947 issue of The American Magazine

1. "The Case of the Crying Swallow" (1947)
  The American Magazine, August 1947
  Published with The Case of the Cautious Coquette (1949) and then in a short story collection The Case of the Crying Swallow published in 1970.
2. "The Case of the Crimson Kiss" (1948)
  The American Magazine, June 1948
  Published with The Case of the Cautious Coquette (1949) and then in a short story collection The Case of the Crimson Kiss published in 1971.
3. "The Case of the Suspect Sweethearts" (1950)
  Radio and Television Mirror, May 1950; radio series tie-in with Della Street's byline
4. "The Case of the Irate Witness" (1953)
  Collier's, January 17, 1953
  First book publication Fiction Goes to Court : Favorite Stories of Lawyers and the Law Selected by Famous Lawyers (1954) and later included in the short story collections The Case of the Irate Witness in 1970, and The Oxford Book of Detective Stories (2000).

== Pastiche ==
After Gardner's death, Thomas Chastain wrote two Perry Mason novels licensed by the author's estate, "based on characters created by Erle Stanley Gardner". Both follow the made-for-TV movies in the use of Paul Drake, Jr.

1. Perry Mason in The Case of Too Many Murders (1989) – A businessman seems to have been in two places at once—once as a murderer, once as a victim.
2. Perry Mason in The Case of the Burning Bequest (1990) – Mason's client has apparently killed his mother-in-law-to-be in the same room where his fiancée's real mother was killed by the client's father. The case is complicated further by the client's refusal to exonerate himself.

== See also ==
- Erle Stanley Gardner bibliography
