= Raj Kanwar (journalist) =

Indian journalist and writer (1930–2022)

Raj Kanwar (1930 – 31 October 2022) was an Indian journalist, writer and entrepreneur based in Dehradun.

== Life ==
Raj Kanwar was born in Lahore, British Raj, on 8 October 1930. In June 1947 his family shifted to Dehradun with the intention of waiting out the riots of that year. What was meant to be a short stay, turned permanent. In college in Dehradun, Kanwar started writing, becoming a student editor of a fortnightly publication. He also became a stringer for The Tribune, The Indian Express and The Statesman in the 1950s. In 1953 he started an English weekly called 'Vanguard'. Here he started writing about government organisations such as the Ordnance Factory in Dehradun and the Survey of India. His stories would go on to attract the attention of The Indian Express and was hired by the paper as a reporter in Delhi.

Kanwar left his job in New Delhi and in 1959 he joined the government of Himachal Pradesh as an editor in its public relations department. He went on to become the first public relations officer for the state-owned Oil and Natural Gas Commission (ONGC). Kanwar recalled that about a hundred Russians had come to Dehradun to set up ONGC, and as such the city was influenced by their presence; vegetable sellers would learn Russian words; "desi vodka was invented". Kanwar was then sent to Gujarat to help with ONGC operations followed by a posting in Sibsagar in Assam.

After three years he resigned from his post in ONGC and went to Calcutta for an advertising job. He left in a year and returned to Dehradun. In Dehradun he started "Witness - Newsweekly with a Difference". Inspired by American author Erle Stanley Gardner's titles such as "The case of the defective registers", he would choose similar titles for his investigative exposes.

In 1970 he founded SK Oilfield Equipment Co which is now run by his son. As a freelancer he has written columns for numerous newspapers. As of 2020, Kanwar was 90; as he was not able to write himself he took the assistance of a secretary. He was a regular writer of obituaries for Doonites. He initiated Writers' Combine, a group focusing on young writers and readers in the valley.

Kanwar died on 31 October 2022, at the age of 92. He had been working on his fourth book titled "Writer of Obituaries".

== Publications ==
- Upstream India: Fifty Golden Years of ONGC (2006). ISBN 9788190390309
- ONGC: The Untold Story (2018). Bloomsbury. ISBN 978-9388271394
- Dateline Dehradun (2020) Self published/ Saraswati Press. Foreword by Navtej Sarna. ISBN 978-9353968793
