= Erle Stanley Gardner bibliography =

This is a bibliography of works by and about the American writer Erle Stanley Gardner.

== Mystery series ==
=== Perry Mason ===
==== Novels ====
Year	Title	Publisher	Publication date	Notes
1933	The Case of the Velvet Claws	Morrow	March 1933	
1933	The Case of the Sulky Girl	Morrow	September 1933	
1934	The Case of the Lucky Legs	Morrow	February 1934	
1934	The Case of the Howling Dog	Morrow	June 1934	
1934	The Case of the Curious Bride	Morrow	November 1934	
1935	The Case of the Counterfeit Eye	Morrow	April 1935	
1935	The Case of the Caretaker's Cat	Morrow	September 1935	
1936	The Case of the Sleepwalker's Niece	Morrow	March 1936	
1936	The Case of the Stuttering Bishop	Morrow	September 1936	
1937	The Case of the Dangerous Dowager	Morrow	April 1937	
1937	The Case of the Lame Canary	Morrow	September 1937	
1938	The Case of the Substitute Face	Morrow	April 1938	
1938	The Case of the Shoplifter's Shoe	Morrow	September 1938	
1939	The Case of the Perjured Parrot	Morrow	February 1939	
1939	The Case of the Rolling Bones	Morrow	November 1939	
1940	The Case of the Baited Hook	Morrow	March 1940	
1940	The Case of the Silent Partner	Morrow	November 1940	
1941	The Case of the Haunted Husband	Morrow	February 1941	
1941	The Case of the Empty Tin	Morrow	October 1941	
1942	The Case of the Drowning Duck	Morrow	May 1942	
1942	The Case of the Careless Kitten	Morrow	September 1942	
1943	The Case of the Buried Clock	Morrow	May 1943	
1943	The Case of the Drowsy Mosquito	Morrow	September 1943	
1944	The Case of the Crooked Candle	Morrow	May 1944	
1944	The Case of the Black-Eyed Blonde	Morrow	November 1944	
1945	The Case of the Golddigger's Purse	Morrow	May 1945	
1945	The Case of the Half-Wakened Wife	Morrow	September 1945	
1946	The Case of the Borrowed Brunette	Morrow	November 1946	
1947	The Case of the Fan Dancer's Horse	Morrow	June 1947	
1947	The Case of the Lazy Lover	Morrow	October 1947	
1948	The Case of the Lonely Heiress	Morrow	February 1948	
1948	The Case of the Vagabond Virgin	Morrow	July 1948	
1949	The Case of the Dubious Bridegroom	Morrow	February 1949	
1949	The Case of the Cautious Coquette	Morrow	May 1949	
1950	The Case of the Negligent Nymph	Morrow	January 1950	
1950	The Case of the One-Eyed Witness	Morrow	November 1950	
1951	The Case of the Fiery Fingers	Morrow	May 1951	
1951	The Case of the Angry Mourner	Morrow	October 1951	
1952	The Case of the Moth-Eaten Mink	Morrow	April 1952	
1952	The Case of the Grinning Gorilla	Morrow	November 1952	
1953	The Case of the Hesitant Hostess	Morrow	April 1953	
1953	The Case of the Green-Eyed Sister	Morrow	November 1953	
1954	The Case of the Fugitive Nurse	Morrow	February 1954	
1954	The Case of the Runaway Corpse	Morrow	June 1954	
1954	The Case of the Restless Redhead	Morrow	October 1954	
1955	The Case of the Glamorous Ghost	Morrow	January 1955	
1955	The Case of the Sun Bather's Diary	Morrow	May 1955	
1955	The Case of the Nervous Accomplice	Morrow	September 1955	
1956	The Case of the Terrified Typist	Morrow	January 1956	
1956	The Case of the Demure Defendant	Morrow	May 1956	
1956	The Case of the Gilded Lily	Morrow	September 1956	
1957	The Case of the Lucky Loser	Morrow	January 1957	
1957	The Case of the Screaming Woman	Morrow	May 1957	
1957	The Case of the Daring Decoy	Morrow	October 1957	
1958	The Case of the Long-Legged Models	Morrow	January 1958	
1958	The Case of the Foot-Loose Doll	Morrow	May 1958	
1958	The Case of the Calendar Girl	Morrow	October 1958	
1959	The Case of the Deadly Toy	Morrow	January 1959	
1959	The Case of the Mythical Monkeys	Morrow	June 1959	
1959	The Case of the Singing Skirt	Morrow	September 1959	
1960	The Case of the Waylaid Wolf	Morrow	January 1960	
1960	The Case of the Duplicate Daughter	Morrow	June 1960	
1960	The Case of the Shapely Shadow	Morrow	October 1960	
1961	The Case of the Spurious Spinster	Morrow	March 1961	
1961	The Case of the Bigamous Spouse	Morrow	August 1961	
1962	The Case of the Reluctant Model	Morrow	January 1962	
1962	The Case of the Blonde Bonanza	Morrow	June 1962	
1962	The Case of the Ice-Cold Hands	Morrow	October 1962	
1963	The Case of the Mischievous Doll	Morrow	February 1963	
1963	The Case of the Stepdaughter's Secret	Morrow	June 1963	
1963	The Case of the Amorous Aunt	Morrow	September 1963	
1964	The Case of the Daring Divorcee	Morrow	February 1964	
1964	The Case of the Phantom Fortune	Morrow	May 1964	
1964	The Case of the Horrified Heirs	Morrow	September 1964	
1965	The Case of the Troubled Trustee	Morrow	February 1965	
1965	The Case of the Beautiful Beggar	Morrow	June 1965	
1966	The Case of the Worried Waitress	Morrow	August 1966	
1967	The Case of the Queenly Contestant	Morrow	May 1967	
1968	The Case of the Careless Cupid	Morrow	March 1968	
1969	The Case of the Fabulous Fake	Morrow	November 1969	
1972	The Case of the Fenced-In Woman	Morrow	September 1972	
1973	The Case of the Postponed Murder	Morrow	1973	

==== Short stories ====
Year	Title	Publisher	Publication date	Notes
1947	The Case of the Crying Swallow	The American Magazine	August 1947	(Note: Published with The Case of Cautious Coquette (1949) and then in the short story collection The Case of the Crying Swallow published in 1970.)
1948	The Case of the Crimson Kiss	The American Magazine	June 1948	(Note: Published with The Case of the Cautious Coquette (1949) and then in the short story collection The Case of the Crimson Kiss published in 1971.)
1950	The Case of the Suspect Sweethearts	Radio and Television Mirror	May 1950	(Note: Perry Mason radio series tie-in with Della Street's byline)
1953	The Case of the Irate Witness	Collier's	January 17, 1953	(Note: First book publication Fiction Goes to Court : Favorite Stories of Lawyers and the Law Selected by Famous Lawyers (1954) and later included in the short story collections The Case of the Irate Witness in 1970, and The Oxford Book of Detective Stories (2000).)

=== Cool and Lam ===
Year	Title	Publisher	Publication date	Notes
1939	The Bigger They Come	Morrow	January 1939	
1939	The Knife Slipped	Hard Case Crime	December 2016	
1940	Turn on the Heat	Morrow	January 1940	
1940	Gold Comes in Bricks	Morrow	September 1940	
1941	Spill the Jackpot!	Morrow	March 1941	
1941	Double or Quits	Morrow	December 1941	
1942	Owls Don't Blink	Morrow	June 1942	
1942	Bats Fly at Dusk	Morrow	September 1942	
1943	Cats Prowl at Night	Morrow	August 1943	
1944	Give 'em the Ax	Morrow	September 1944	
1946	Crows Can't Count	Morrow	April 1946	
1947	Fools Die on Friday	Morrow	September 1947	
1949	Bedrooms Have Windows	Morrow	January 1949	
1952	Top of the Heap	Morrow	February 1952	
1953	Some Women Won't Wait	Morrow	September 1953	
1956	Beware the Curves	Morrow	November 1956	
1957	You Can Die Laughing	Morrow	March 1957	
1957	Some Slips Don't Show	Morrow	October 1957	
1958	The Count of Nine	Morrow	June 1958	
1959	Pass the Gravy	Morrow	February 1959	
1960	Kept Women Can't Quit	Morrow	September 1960	
1961	Bachelors Get Lonely	Morrow	March 1961	
1961	Shills Can't Cash Chips	Morrow	November 1961	
1962	Try Anything Once	Morrow	April 1962	
1963	Fish or Cut Bait	Morrow	April 1963	
1964	Up for Grabs	Morrow	March 1964	
1965	Cut Thin to Win	Morrow	April 1965	
1966	Widows Wear Weeds	Morrow	May 1966	
1967	Traps Need Fresh Bait	Morrow	March 1967	
1970	All Grass isn't Green	Morrow	March 1970	

=== Doug Selby ===
Year	Title	Publisher	Publication date	Notes
1937	The D.A. Calls it Murder	Morrow	January 1937	
1938	The D.A. Holds a Candle	Morrow	November 1938	
1939	The D.A. Draws a Circle	Morrow	September 1939	
1940	The D.A. Goes to Trial	Morrow	June 1940	
1942	The D.A. Cooks a Goose	Morrow	January 1942	
1944	The D.A. Calls a Turn	Morrow	January 1944	
1946	The D.A. Breaks a Seal	Morrow	February 1946	
1948	The D.A. Takes a Chance	Morrow	October 1948	
1949	The D.A. Breaks an Egg	Morrow	August 1949	

=== Terry Clane ===
Year	Title	Publisher	Publication date	Notes
1937	Murder Up My Sleeve	Morrow	November 1937	Cosmopolitan, September 1937 (Note: The bibliography in Dorothy B. Hughes' biography of Gardner was compiled by Ruth "Honey" Moore, the youngest of the three Walter sisters who were Gardner's longtime secretaries.)
1946	The Case of the Backward Mule	Morrow	July 1946	

=== Gramps Wiggins ===
Per the foreword to The Case of the Smoking Chimney, Gramps Wiggins is based on someone that Erle Stanley Gardner met: "More frequently than they realise, authors are inspired by outstanding individuals whom they meet. Two years ago in New Orleans I met a litle old chap who has as much bounce as a rubber ball, whose eyes sparkle with enthusiasm, whose white hair shaggles down around his shoulders. His name is Wood Whitesell." Whitesell was a photographer who didn't care about money and was frequently too busy to think about eating, as he tried to crowd all the activities he wanted to do into the day. Gardner said "Whitesell and Gramp Wiggins are, of course, two distinct entities, although they have numerous points in common. To what extent Gramps was inspired by Whitesell even I don't know. All I know is that after a winter in New Orleans during which I became well acquainted with Whitesell, Gramp Wiggins walked into my consciousness one day and demanded to be set down on paper. As I began to portray Gramps, I realized how very much in common he had with Wood Whitesell."

Year	Title	Publisher	Publication date	Notes
1941	The Case of the Turning Tide	Morrow	July 1941	
1943	The Case of the Smoking Chimney	Morrow	January 1943	

== Other fiction ==
=== Novels ===
Year	Title	Publisher	Publication date	Notes
1935	The Clue of the Forgotten Murder	Morrow	January 1935	Sidney Griff book, as Carleton Kendrake
1935	This Is Murder	Morrow	June 1935	Sam Moraine book, as Charles J. Kenny
1935	The Dark Blond	Newspaper Enterprise Association Service	March–May 1935	Book-length serialization, as Carleton Kendrake (Note: NEA serialization of The Dark Blond in the El Paso Herald-Post began March 14 and ended May 8, 1935.)
1950	The Case of the Musical Cow	Morrow	June 1950	Serialized as "The Case of the Smuggler's Bell" in Collier's, March 25 – April 29, 1950
1961	The Blonde in Lower Six	Argosy	September 1961	Ed Jenkins book-length

=== Short stories and novellas ===
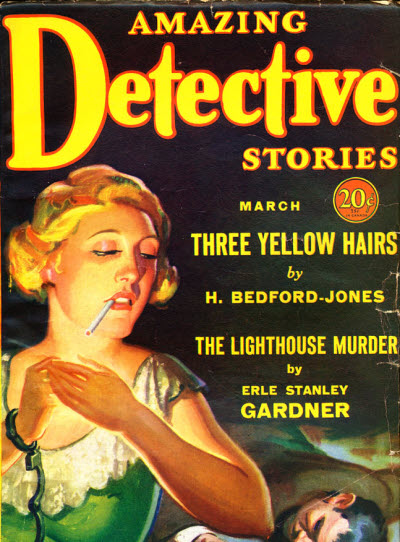
"The Lighthouse Murder" appeared in the March 1931 issue of Amazing Detective Stories

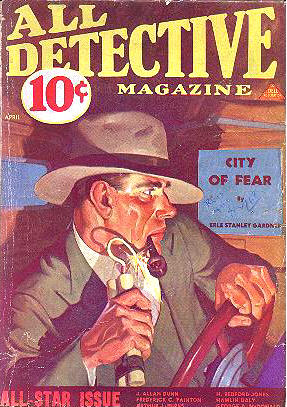
"City of Fear" on the cover of All Detective Magazine (April 1933)

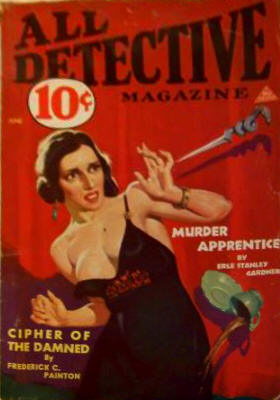
"Murder Apprentice", Gardner's first Dudley Bell story, on the cover of All Detective Magazine (June 1933)

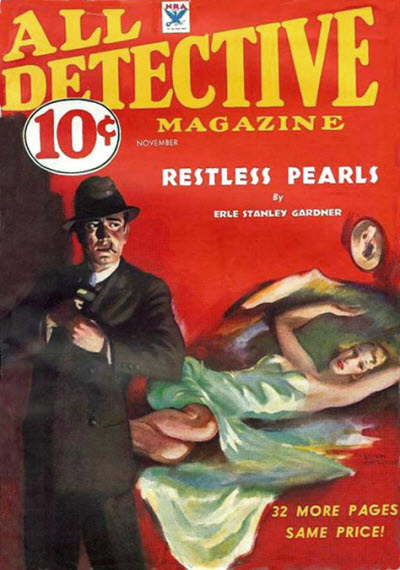
"Restless Pearls" on the cover of All Detective Magazine (November 1933)

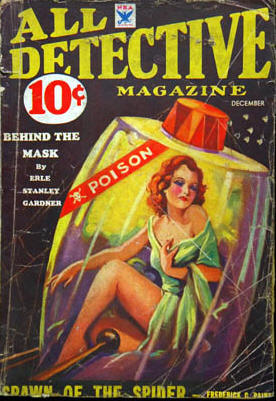
"Behind the Mask", a Bob Crowder story, on the cover of All Detective Magazine (December 1933)

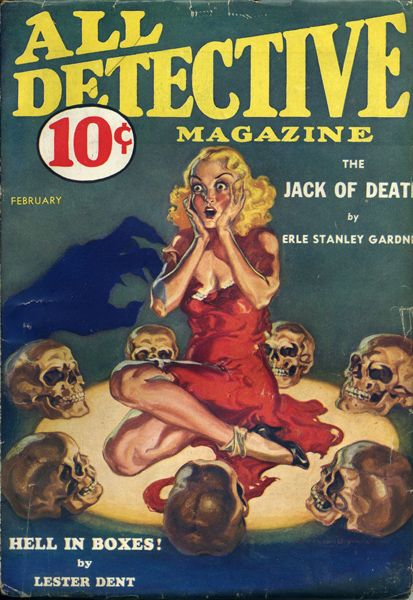
"The Jack of Death" on cover of All Detective Magazine (February 1934)

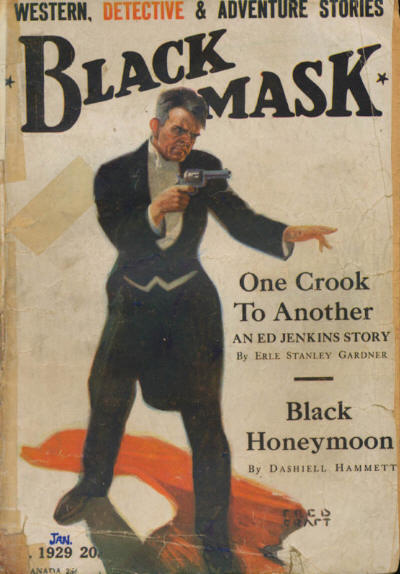
January 1929 issue of Black Mask, featuring Gardner

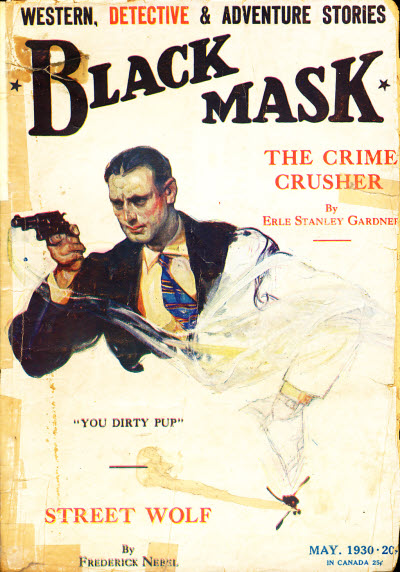
May 1930 issue of Black Mask, featuring Gardner

Year	Title	Publisher	Publication date	Notes
1921	"The Police of the House"	Breezy Stories	June 1921	two-page story
1921	"Nellie's Naughty Nightie"	Breezy Stories	August 1921	four-page story
1921	"The Game of the Badger"	Young's Magazine	August 1921	three-page story
1923	"Nothin' to It"	Young's Realistic Stories Magazine	September, 1923	fiction story as Charles M. Green
1923	"The Shrieking Skeleton"	Black Mask	December 15, 1923	as Charles M. Green
1924	"The Serpent's Coils"	Black Mask	January 1, 1924	as Charles M. Green
1924	"A Month on Impulse"	People's	January 1, 1924	as Charles M. Green
1924	"The Verdict"	Black Mask	February 1, 1924	as Charles M. Green
1924	"The Point of Intersection"	Mystery Magazine	April 15, 1924	as Charles M. Green
1924	"A Fair Trial"	Black Mask	June 1924	Anonymous
1924	"Parties to Proof"	Top-Notch Magazine	July 15, 1924	
1924	"Accommodatin' a Lady"	Black Mask	September 1924	Bob Larkin short story
1924	"Anything Can Happen" aka "The Cave"	The Smart Set	November 1924	as Charles M. Green
1924	"Without No Reindeer"	Black Mask	December 1924	Bob Larkin novelette
1924	"The Seventh Glass"	Mystery Magazine	December 1, 1924	as Charles M. Green
1925	"One Chance to Love" aka "The Soul of a Woman"	Dell Publications	January 1925	
1925	"Bloody Bill Obeys"	Chicago Ledger	January 1925	as Charles M. Green
1925	"Beyond the Law"	Black Mask	January 1925	Ed Jenkins novelette
1925	"The Fog Ghost"	Top-Notch Magazine	January 1, 1925	
1925	"Jim Hurd's Wife"	The Smart Set	February 1925	as Charles M. Green
1925	"The Case of the Misplaced Thumbs"	Top-Notch Magazine	February 1, 1925	Speed Dash novelette
1925	"The Trap"	Chicago Ledger	February 14, 1925	as Charles M. Green
1925	"Hard as Nails"	Black Mask	March 1925	Ed Jenkins novelette
1925	"The Last Wallop"	Short Stories	March 10, 1925	Western short story
1925	"Ten Days After Date"	Top-Notch Magazine	March 15, 1925	Speed Dash novelette
1925	"Beyond the Limit"	Sunset	April 1925	
1925	"Eyes of the Night"	Fawcett’s Triple-X Magazine	April 1925	as Charles M. Green
1925	"Painless Extraction"	Black Mask	May 1925	Bob Larkin novelette
1925	"With Fingers of Steel"	Top-Notch Magazine	May 15, 1925	Speed Dash novelette
1925	"Not So Darn Bad"	Black Mask	June 1925	Ed Jenkins novelette
1925	"Three O'Clock in the Morning"	Black Mask	July 1925	Ed Jenkins novelette
1925	"Ham, Eggs and Coffee"	Black Mask	August 1925	Bob Larkin novelette
1925	"Tempering Fires"	The Farmer's Wife	August–September 1925	
1925	"A Bachelor an' a Orphan" aka "On the Mojave Trail"	Munsey Magazines / Argosy All-Story Weekly	September 1925	
1925	"The Law of Cactus Flats"	Argosy All-Story Weekly	September 12, 1925	
1925	"The Room of Falling Flies"	Top-Notch Magazine	September 15, 1925	Speed Dash novelette
1925	"The Girl Goes with Me"	Black Mask	November 1925	Black Barr novelette
1925	"The Case of the Candied Diamonds"	Top-Notch Magazine	November 15, 1925	Speed Dash novelette
1925	"A Desert 'Sheek'"	Brief Stories	December 1925	Western short story
1925	"A Triple Cross"	Black Mask	December 1925	Ed Jenkins novelette
1925	"The Third Degree"		Approximately 1925	
1926	"Before Dawn"	Brief Stories	January 1926	Western short story
1926	"Part Music and Part Tears"	The Smart Set	January 1926	as Anonymous
1926	"According to Law"	Black Mask	January 1926	Ed Jenkins novelette
1926	"Any One Named Smith"	Flynn's Detective Fiction	January 16, 1926	
1926	"Twisted Bars"	West	January 20, 1926	The Old Walrus short story
1926	"Goin' Into Action"	Black Mask	February 1926	Bob Larkin short story
1926	"The Skeleton Accomplice"	Top-Notch Magazine	February 1, 1926	
1926	"Open and Shut"	Mystery Magazine	February 15, 1926	
1926	"Hoss Sense"	Brief Stories	March 1926	Western short story
1926	"You Can't Run Away from Yourself" aka "The Jazz Baby"	Macfadden Publications, True Experiences	March 1926	as Anonymous
1926	"An Eye for a Tooth"	West	March 20, 1926	The Old Walrus short story
1926	"Register Rage"	Black Mask	April 1926	Ed Jenkins novelette
1926	"The Will of Richard Ware"	The Farmer's Wife	April 1926	
1926	"When a Man's Alone"	The Smart Set	April 2, 1926	
1926	"Doing It Up Brown"	Short Stories	April 10, 1926	Western novelette
1926	"According to Schedule"	West	April 20, 1926	The Old Walrus short story
1926	"Thisissosudden!"	Black Mask	May 1926	Ed Jenkins novelette
1926	"A Feather in His Cap"	Top-Notch Magazine	May 1, 1926	
1926	"Smiley Lane's Wall-Eyed Jinx"	Fightin Romances	June 1926	Western short story
1926	"Forget 'em All"	Black Mask	June 1926	Ed Jenkins novelette
1926	"The Veil of Veracity" aka "Walrus"	Cowboy Stories	June 1926	
1926	"Now Listen!"	Sunset	June 1926	
1926	"A Mate for Effie A"	Argosy All-Story Weekly	June 26, 1926	
1926	"On the Poison Trail"	Fawcett’s Triple-X Magazine	July 1926	Western novelette
1926	"In Love and War"	Argosy All-Story Weekly	July 24, 1926	
1926	"Hazel of the Mining Camps"	The Smart Set	August 1926	
1926	"The Law of Glancing Bullets"	The Smart Set	August 25, 1926	Fish Mouth McGinnis short story
1926	"Laugh That Off"	Black Mask	September 1926	Ed Jenkins novelette
1926	"A Time-Lock Triangle"	Black Mask	September 1, 1926	Speed Dash novelette
1926	"The Mob Buster"	Argosy All-Story Weekly	September 4, 1926	Western short story
1926	"On All Six"	Argosy All-Story Weekly	September 25, 1926	
1926	"The Rough Shadow"	Clues	October 1926	
1926	"Buzzard Bait"	Black Mask	October 1926	Black Barr novelette
1926	"Money, Marbles and Chalk"	Black Mask	November 1926	Ed Jenkins novelette
1926	"More Than Skin Deep"	Top-Notch Magazine	November 15, 1926	Western short story
1926	"Dead Men's Letters"	Black Mask	December 1926	Ed Jenkins novelette
1926	"The Meandering Trail"	Ace High	December 18, 1926	Western short story
1927	"Whispering Sand"	Black Mask	January 1927	Black Barr novelette
1927	"The Game Winner" aka "The Winner"	Ace High	January 18, 1927	The Old Walrus novelette
1927	"The Cat-Woman"	Black Mask	February 1927	Ed Jenkins novelette
1927	"Three Days to Midnight"	Top-Notch Magazine	February 1, 1927	Speed Dash novelette
1927	"This Way Out"	Black Mask	March 1927	Ed Jenkins novelette
1927	"The Cards of Death" aka "The Blue-Green Death"	Clues	March 1927	
1927	"The Canyon of the Curse"	Fawcett’s Triple-X Magazine	March 1927	Western novelette
1927	"The Back Trail"	Short Stories	March 10, 1927	Western short story
1927	"Come and Get It"	Black Mask	April 1927	Ed Jenkins novelette
1927	"For Higher Stakes"	Top-Notch Magazine	April 1, 1927	Speed Dash novelette
1927	"Aces Back to Back"	West	April 20, 1927	Buck Riley novelette
1927	"Fair Warning"	Clues	May 1927	
1927	"The Crime Trail"	Clues	May 1927	Sheriff Billy Bales short story, as Stephen Caldwell
1927	"In Full Account"	Black Mask	May 1, 1927	Ed Jenkins novelette
1927	"The Hope-So Hunch"	Top-Notch Magazine	May 1, 1927	Maggie French novelette
1927	"A Load of Dynamite"	West	May 5, 1927	The Old Walrus short story
1927	"The Red Skull" aka "The Crimson Skull"	Clues	June 1927	
1927	"On the Stroke of Twelve"	Top-Notch Magazine	June 15, 1927	Speed Dash novelette
1927	"Ribbons of Light"	Top-Notch Magazine	August 15, 1927	Speed Dash novelette
1927	"Where the Buzzards Circle"	Black Mask	September 1927	Black Barr novelette
1927	"One Hundred Feet of Rope"	Brief Stories	October 1927	Buck Riley short story
1927	"The Wax Dragon"	Black Mask	November 1927	Ed Jenkins novelette
1927	"Double Action"	Short Stories	November 25, 1927	Western novelette
1927	"The Tenth Point"	Outdoor Stories	December 1927	Western novelette
1927	"Grinning Gods"	Black Mask	December 1927	Ed Jenkins novelette
1927	"The Getaway"		Approximately 1927	as Charles M. Green
1928	"The Right Track"	Complete Stories	January 1928	
1928	"The Bullet Guide"	Everybody's	January 1928	Western short story
1928	"The Devil's Thumb"	Brief Stories	February 1928	Buck Riley Lost Mine novelette
1928	"Yellow Shadows"	Black Mask	February 1928	Ed Jenkins novelette
1928	"Lord of the High Places"	Top-Notch Magazine	February 1, 1928	Speed Dash novelette
1928	"The Door of Death" aka "The Panel of Doom"	Clues	February 25, 1928	
1928	"Whispering Feet"	Black Mask	March 1928	Ed Jenkins novelette
1928	"Snow Bird"	Black Mask	April 1928	Ed Jenkins novelette
1928	"Claws of the Man-Bird"	Top-Notch Magazine	April 1, 1928	Speed Dash novelette
1928	"Dead Center"	Three Star Magazine	April 12 – May 24, 1928	
1928	"Out of the Shadows"	Black Mask	May 1928	Ed Jenkins novelette
1928	"The Guilty Trail"	Clues	May 25, 1928	Sheriff Billy Bales short story
1928	"Grubstake"	Short Stories	May 25, 1928	Western short story
1928	"The Fugitive Man-Hunter"	Short Stories	June 10, 1928	Western short story
1928	"The Death Shadow"	Clues	June 10, 1928	Sheriff Billy Bales short story
1928	"Gun Language"	Three Star Magazine	June 28, 1928	Western novelette
1928	"The Law of the Lawless"	Brief Stories	July 1928	Western novelette
1928	"Trapped in Darkness"	Top-Notch Magazine	July 1, 1928	Speed Dash novelette
1928	"The Feminine Touch"	Clues	July 10, 1928	
1928	"The Diamond of Destiny"	Clues	July 25, 1928	
1928	"The Skull Crusher" aka "Hands of Death"	Three Star Magazine	June 26, 1928	Dave Barker novelette
1928	"Fangs of Fate"	Black Mask	August 1928	Black Barr novelette
1928	"Sky Pirates"	Three Star Magazine	August 9, 1928	
1928	"The Fall Guy" aka "Framed For a Rap"	Clues	August 10, 1928	
1928	"Fingers of Fate"	Three Star Magazine	August 23, 1928	
1928	"Hard-Boiled" aka "With Both Fists"	Clues	August 25, 1928	
1928	"The Devil's Deputy"	Black Mask	September 1928	Black Barr novelette
1928	"The Case of the Crushed Carnation"	Top-Notch Magazine	September 1, 1928	Speed Dash novelette
1928	"A Bolt from the Blue"	Air Adventures	October 1928 – February 1929	
1928	"Rain Magic"	Argosy All-Story Weekly	October 20, 1928	
1928	"Brood of the Sea"	Three Star Magazine	October 25, 1928	
1928	"Ripples of Doom"	Clues	October 25, 1928	Dred Bart novelette
1928	"Curse of the Killers"	Black Mask	November 1928	Black Barr novelette
1928	"The Weak Link"	Detective Fiction Weekly	November 10, 1928	
1928	"Bare Hands"	Argosy All-Story Weekly	November 10, 1928	
1928	"A Point of Honor" aka "The Ghost-Crook"	Clues	November 10, 1928	
1928	"The Next Stiff"	Black Mask	December 1928	Ed Jenkins novelette
1928	"Crooked Lightning"	Detective Fiction Weekly	December 29, 1928	
1929	"One Crook to Another"	Black Mask	January 1929	Ed Jenkins novelette
1929	"Whispering Death"	Five Novels Monthly	January 1929	Ed Jenkins novelette
1929	"Phantom Bullets"	Top-Notch Magazine	January 1, 1929	Speed Dash novelette
1929	"An Artistic Job"	Detective Fiction Weekly	January 19, 1929	
1929	"Bracelets for Two"	Black Mask	February 1929	Ed Jenkins novelette
1929	"Routine Stuff"	Mystery Stories	February 1929	
1929	"Just a Suspicion"	Detective Fiction Weekly	February 9, 1929	
1929	"The Painted Decoy"	Detective Fiction Weekly	February 23, 1929	Lester Leith novelette
1929	"Hooking the Crooks"	Black Mask	March 1929	Ed Jenkins novelette
1929	"Claws of Crime"	Top-Notch Magazine	March 1, 1929	Speed Dash novelette
1929	"A Tip from Scuttle"	Detective Fiction Weekly	March 2, 1929	Lester Leith novelette
1929	"The Dummy Murder"	Detective Fiction Weekly	March 23, 1929	Lester Leith novelette
1929	"No Questions Asked"	Black Mask	April 1929	Ed Jenkins novelette
1929	"Hairtrigger Trails the Hawk" aka "No-Limit Men"	Fawcett’s Triple-X Magazine	April 1929	Western novelette
1929	"The Case of the Fugitive Corpse"	Detective Fiction Weekly	April 6, 1929	Lester Leith novelette
1929	"The Pay-Off"	Detective Fiction Weekly	April 27, 1929	Lester Leith novelette
1929	"A Hot Tip"	Detective Fiction Weekly	May 11, 1929	Lester Leith novelette
1929	"Wings of Destiny"	West	May 15, 1929	Western novelette
1929	"On the Up and Up"	Clues	May 25, 1929	
1929	"Scum of the Border"	Black Mask	June 1929	Bob Larkin novelette
1929	"Manacled Vengeance"	Top-Notch Magazine	June 1, 1929	
1929	"A Clean Slate for Slider"	Detective Fiction Weekly	June 8, 1929	
1929	"King of the Eagle Clan"	Top-Notch Magazine	June 15, 1929	Speed Dash novelette
1929	"All the Way"	Black Mask	July 1929	Bob Larkin novelette
1929	"The Betraying Emotion"	Detective Fiction Weekly	July 6, 1929	Dred Bart short story
1929	"A Peach of a Scheme"	Detective Fiction Weekly	July 20, 1929	Lester Leith novelette
1929	"State's Evidence"	Clues	July 25, 1929	
1929	"Monkey Eyes"	Argosy All-Story Weekly	July 27 – August 3, 1929	
1929	"Spawn of the Night"	Black Mask	August 1929	Bob Larkin novelette
1929	"Even Money"	Detective Fiction Weekly	August 3, 1929	Lester Leith novelette
1929	"It's a Pipe!"	Detective Fiction Weekly	August 10, 1929	Lester Leith novelette
1929	"The Hand of the Tong"	Clues	August 25, 1929	
1929	"Faster than Forty"	Detective Fiction Weekly	August 31, 1929	Lester Leith novelette
1929	"Hanging Friday"	Black Mask	September 1929	Bob Larkin novelette
1929	"Hawks of the Midnight Sky"	Top-Notch Magazine	September 15, 1929	Speed Dash novelette
1929	"Double Shadows"	Detective Fiction Weekly	September 21, 1929	Lester Leith novelette
1929	"The Winning Hand"	Clues	September 25, 1929	
1929	"Straight from the Shoulder"	Black Mask	October 1929	Ed Jenkins novelette
1929	"The Artistic Touch"	Detective Fiction Weekly	October 26, 1929	Lester Leith novelette
1929	"Brass Tacks"	Black Mask	November 1929	Ed Jenkins novelette
1929	"The Letter of the Law"	Clues	November 10, 1929	
1929	"Lester Takes the Cake"	Detective Fiction Weekly	November 23, 1929	Lester Leith novelette
1929	"Triple Treachery"	Black Mask	December 1929	Ed Jenkins novelette
1929	"The Hard-Boiled Company" aka "The Inside Track"	Prize Detective	December 1929	as Robert Parr
1929	"The Disappearing Witnesses"	Prize Detective	December 1929 + February 1930	
1929	"The Sky's the Limit"	Argosy	December 7–14, 1929	
1929	"The Surprise Party"	Clues	December 25, 1929	
1929	"Framed"	Detective Fiction Weekly	December 28, 1929	
1930	"Double or Quits"	Black Mask	January 1930	Ed Jenkins novelette
1930	"Blue for Blooey"	Argosy	January 4, 1930	
1930	"The Doubltful Egg"	Detective Fiction Weekly	January 11, 1930	Lester Leith novelette
1930	"Above the Fog"	Flyers	February 1930	
1930	"Vanishing Shadows" aka "A Sock on the Jaw"	Detective Fiction Weekly	February 8, 1930	Lester Leith novelette
1930	"Midnight Justice"	Top-Notch Magazine	March 1, 1930	Speed Dash novelette
1930	"The Higher Court"	Detective Fiction Weekly	March 8, 1930	Sidney Zoom short story
1930	"Gold Blindness"	Argosy	March 8, 1930	Whispering Sands novelette
1930	"Fall Guy"	Argosy	March 22, 1930	Whispering Sands novelette
1930	"The Game of Tai Lee"	Clues	March 25, 1930	The Patent Leather Kid short story
1930	"Willie the Weeper"	Detective Fiction Weekly	March 29, 1930	Sidney Zoom short story
1930	"The Guy that Bumped Grigsley"	Short Stories	April 10, 1930	
1930	"My Name is Zoom!"	Detective Fiction Weekly	April 12, 1930	Sidney Zoom novelette
1930	"An Adventure in Crime" aka "Blind Man's Bluff"	All Star Detective Stories	May 1930	
1930	"The Crime Crusher"	Black Mask	May 1930	Ed Jenkins novelette
1930	"Both Ends Against the Middle"	Detective Fiction Weekly	May 3, 1930	Lester Leith novelette
1930	"The Purple Plume"	Detective Fiction Weekly	May 24, 1930	Sidney Zoom novelette
1930	"Loose Threads of Crime"	Clues	May 25, 1930	
1930	"Stone Frogs"	Argosy	May 31, 1930	Whispering Sands: Bob Zane short story
1930	"Hell's Kettle"	Black Mask	June 1930	Ed Jenkins novelette
1930	"The Valley of Feuds"	Prize Air Pilot Stories	June 1930	
1930	"Golden Bullets"	Argosy	June 7, 1930	Whispering Sands: Bob Zane short story
1930	"Put It in Writing!"	Detective Fiction Weekly	June 7, 1930	Lester Leith novelette
1930	"Gods Who Frown"	Clues	June 15, 1930	Yee Dooey Wah short story
1930	"A Fair Reward"	Detective Fiction Weekly	June 28, 1930	
1930	"Big Shot"	Black Mask	July 1930	Ed Jenkins novelette
1930	"The Choice of Weapons"	Detective Fiction Weekly	July 12, 1930	Senor Lobo short story
1930	"A Short Cut to Rome"	Complete Stories	July 15, 1930	
1930	"A Year in a Day"	Argosy	July 19, 1930	
1930	"Stained"	Clues	July 25, 1930	
1930	"Hot Dollars!"	Detective Fiction Weekly	July 26, 1930	Lester Leith novelette
1930	"The Crime Waffle"	Detective Fiction Weekly	August 9, 1930	
1930	"In Round Figures"	Detective Fiction Weekly	August 23, 1930	Lester Leith novelette
1930	"Thumbs Down"	All Star Detective Stories	September 1930	
1930	"Time In for Tucker"	Detective Fiction Weekly	September 13, 1930	Sidney Zoom novelette
1930	"The Valley of Little Fears"	Argosy	September 13, 1930	Whispering Sands: Bob Zane novelette
1930	"Blood-Red Gold"	Argosy	September 20, 1930	Whispering Sands: Bob Zane novelette
1930	"The Man on the End"	Detective Fiction Weekly	September 27, 1930	Lester Leith novelette
1930	"The Crime Juggler"	Gang World	October 1930	Paul Pry short story
1930	"The Key to Room 537"	Detective Action Stories	October 1930	
1930	"The Voice of the Accuser"	Detective Fiction Weekly	October 11, 1930	Yee Dooey Wah short story
1930	"Payoff at Spillway" aka "Silent Code"	Detective Story	October 25, 1930	as Kyle Corning
1930	"Written in Sand"	Argosy	October 25, 1930	Whispering Sands: Bob Zane short story
1930	"The Fast Worker"	Swift Story	November 1930	
1930	"The Murder Masquerade"	Detective Action Stories	November 1930	
1930	"The Racket Buster"	Gang World	November 1930	Paul Pry short story
1930	"Walrus"	Western Adventures	November 1930	
1930	"Luck Charms"	Detective Fiction Weekly	November 1, 1930	
1930	"Gangsters' Gold"	Detective Fiction Weekly	November 15, 1930	Senor Lobo novelette
1930	"One Man Law"	Clues	November 25, 1930	
1930	"The Daisy Pusher"	Gang World	December 1930	Paul Pry novelette
1930	"Muscling In"	Underworld	December 1930	
1930	"Dead Men's Tales"	Detective Action Stories	December 1930	
1930	"Red Hands"	Detective Fiction Weekly	December 6, 1930	Senor Lobo short story
1930	"Priestess of the Sun"	Argosy	December 6, 1930	Whispering Sands: Bob Zane short story
1930	"Lester Frames a Fence"	Detective Fiction Weekly	December 13, 1930	Lester Leith novelette
1930	"A Horse on Fane"	Clues	December 25, 1930	Western short story
1931	"Fair Play" aka "The Claim Code"	Golden West	January 1931	
1931	"Wiker Gets the Works"	Gang World	January 1931	Paul Pry novelette
1931	"The Mysterious Mr. Manse"	Detective Action Stories	January 1931	Mr. Manse novelette
1931	"Stranger's Silk"	Detective Fiction Weekly	January 3, 1931	Sidney Zoom novelette
1931	"The Man with Pin-Point Eyes"	Argosy	January 10, 1931	
1931	"The Death Penalty"	Detective Fiction Weekly	January 17, 1931	Sidney Zoom novelette
1931	"Cold Clews"	Detective Fiction Weekly	January 24, 1931	Lester Leith novelette
1931	"Airtight Alibis"	Clues	January 25, 1931	
1931	"Tell-Tale Sands"	Complete Stories	February 1931	Fish Mouth McGinnis short story
1931	"Coffins for Six"	All Star Detective Stories	February 1931	
1931	"A Double Deal in Diamonds"	Gang World	February 1931	Paul Pry novelette
1931	"Planted Bait"	Detective Action Stories	February 1931	Mr. Manse novelette
1931	"Dice of Death"	Amazing Detective Stories	February 1931	
1931	"A Matter of Impulse"	Detective Fiction Weekly	February 7, 1931	Senor Lobo novelette
1931	"Killed and Cured"	Detective Fiction Weekly	February 21, 1931	Senor Lobo short story
1931	"The Purple Palm"	Detective Action Stories	March 1931	Mr. Manse novelette
1931	"Riddled with Lead"	Gang World	March 1931	Paul Pry novelette
1931	"The Lighthouse Murder"	Amazing Detective Stories	March 1931	
1931	"Tables for Ladies"	Clues	March 10, 1931	
1931	"The Candy Kid"	Detective Fiction Weekly	March 14, 1931	Lester Leith novelette
1931	"Borrowed Bullets"	Detective Fiction Weekly	March 21, 1931	Sidney Zoom novelette
1931	"The Murder Mark"	Detective Action Stories	April 1931	Mr. Manse novelette
1931	"Slick and Clean"	Gang World	April 1931	Paul Pry novelette
1931	"The Covered Corpse"	Amazing Detective Stories	April 1931	
1931	"First and Last"	Clues	April 10, 1931	
1931	"Big Money"	Detective Fiction Weekly	April 18, 1931	Lester Leith novelette
1931	"Pay Dirt"	Argosy	April 25, 1931	Whispering Sands: Bob Zane novelette
1931	"Hot Tips"	Detective Action Stories	May 1931	
1931	"Hijacker's Code"	Gang World	May 1931	Paul Pry short story
1931	"Her Doggy Friend"	Detective Story	May 2, 1931	
1931	"Carved in Jade"	Detective Fiction Weekly	May 9, 1931	Senor Lobo novelette
1931	"The Devil's Due"	Argosy	May 23, 1931	Major Brane novelette
1931	"Hot Cash"	Detective Fiction Weekly	May 23, 1931	Lester Leith novelette
1931	"The Third Key"	Detective Action Stories	June 1931	
1931	"The Easy Mark"	Gang World	June 1931	Paul Pry short story
1931	"A Chinaman's Chance"	Detective Fiction Weekly	June 6, 1931	
1931	"Sign of the Sun"	Argosy	June 27, 1931	Whispering Sands: Bob Zane novelette
1931	"Not So Dumb"	Detective Fiction Weekly	June 27, 1931	Lester Leith novelette
1931	"One Man Gang"	Gang World	July 1931	Paul Pry novelette
1931	"Tommy Talk"	Black Mask	July 1931	Ed Jenkins novelette
1931	"A Frying Job"	Clues	July 1931	
1931	"The Jellyfish Corpse"	Detective Action Stories	July 1931	
1931	"The Eyes of the Law"	Gangland Stories	July–August 1931	
1931	"The Girl with the Diamond Legs"	Detective Fiction Weekly	July 11, 1931	Lester Leith novelette
1931	"Coffins for Killers"	Detective Fiction Weekly	July 25, 1931	Senor Lobo short story
1931	"Two Flowers of Fate"	Detective Action Stories	August 1931	
1931	"Hoodoo"	Clues	August 1931	
1931	"Hairy Hands"	Black Mask	August 1931	Ed Jenkins novelette
1931	"Car Fare to Chi"	Gang World	August 1931	Paul Pry novelette
1931	"Ain't That Too Bad"	Detective Fiction Weekly	August 1, 1931	
1931	"The Vanishing Corpse"	Detective Fiction Weekly	August 15, 1931	Sidney Zoom novelette
1931	"The Winner" aka "The Game Winner"	Western Adventures	September 1931	reprint Western short story
1931	"The Seal of Silence"	Detective Action Stories	September 1931	
1931	"Promise to Pay"	Black Mask	September 1931	Ed Jenkins novelette
1931	"Muscle Man"	Gang World	September 1931	Paul Pry novelette
1931	"Silent Tongues"	Detective Story	September 5, 1931	as Kyle Corning
1931	"Higher Up"	Detective Fiction Weekly	September 19, 1931	Sidney Zoom novelette
1931	"The Gold Magnet"	Detective Fiction Weekly	September 26, 1931	Lester Leith novelette
1931	"Dead Fingers"	Detective Action Stories	October 1931	
1931	"The Hot Squat"	Black Mask	October 1931	Ed Jenkins novelette
1931	"Loaded with Dynamite"	Gang World	October 1931	Paul Pry novelette
1931	"Stamp of the Desert"	Argosy	October 17, 1931	Whispering Sands: Bob Zane short story
1931	"The First Stone"	Detective Fiction Weekly	October 24, 1931	Sidney Zoom novelette
1931	"The Gloved Mystery"	Detective Action Stories	November 1931	Rex Kane short story
1931	"The Cat-Eyed Wench"	Gang World	November 1931	Paul Pry novelette
1931	"The Crimson Mask"	Detective Fiction Weekly	November 7, 1931	Lester Leith novelette
1931	"Singing Sand"	Argosy	November 7, 1931	Whispering Sands: Bob Zane novelette
1931	"Rolling Stones"	Detective Fiction Weekly	November 21, 1931	Lester Leith novelette
1931	"Turn of the Tide"	Detective Story	November 21, 1931	as Kyle Corning
1931	"Strictly Personal"	Black Mask	December 1931	Ed Jenkins novelette
1931	"The Knockout Guy"	Gang World	December 1931	Paul Pry novelette
1931	"Between Two Fires"	Detective Action Stories	December 1931	Rex Kane short story
1931	"No Rough Stuff"	Detective Fiction Weekly	December 5, 1931	Senor Lobo novelette
1931	"Sauce for the Gander"	Detective Fiction Weekly	December 12, 1931	Senor Lobo novelette
1931	"The Human Zero"	Argosy	December 19, 1931	
1931	"Red Herring"	Detective Fiction Weekly	December 26, 1931	Lester Leith novelette
1931	"Snowy Ducks for Cover"	Dime Detective	November 1931	
1932	"Hell's Fireworks"	Gang World	January 1932	Paul Pry novelette
1932	"Face Up"	Black Mask	January 1932	Ed Jenkins novelette
1932	"The Corkscrew Kid"	Black Aces	January 1932	
1932	"The Whip Hand"	Argosy	January 23, 1932	Whispering Sands: Bob Zane novelette
1932	"Gangster De Luxe"	Gang World	February 1932	Paul Pry novelette
1932	"It Takes a Crook"	Detective Fiction Weekly	February 6, 1932	Sidney Zoom novelette
1932	"The Play's the Thing"	Detective Fiction Weekly	February 27, 1932	Lester Leith novelette
1932	"Gangster De Luxe"	Blue Steel Magazine	March 1932	Paul Pry novelette
1932	"Feet First"	Black Mask	March 1932	Ed Jenkins novelette
1932	"The Dynamite Hour"	Gang World	March 1932	Paul Pry novelette
1932	"Barking Dogs"	Detective Fiction Weekly	March 26, 1932	Senor Lobo novelette
1932	"Hell's Danger Signal"	Gang World	April 1932	Paul Pry novelette
1932	"Straight Crooks"	Black Mask	April 1932	Ed Jenkins novelette
1932	"The Invisible Ring"	Detective Action Stories	April 1932	Rex Kane novelette
1932	"The Land of Poison Springs"	Argosy	April 9, 1932	Whispering Sands: Bob Zane novelette
1932	"The Bird in the Hand"	Detective Fiction Weekly	April 9, 1932	Lester Leith novelette (Note: Reprinted in the 2014 anthology, The Black Lizard Big Book of Locked-Room Mysteries, edited by Otto Penzler)
1932	"A Hundred to One"	Detective Fiction Weekly	April 30, 1932	Senor Lobo novelette
1932	"Under the Guns"	Black Mask	May 1932	Ed Jenkins novelette
1932	"The Unidentified Woman"	Clues	May 1932	Steve Raney short story
1932	"Strangle Holds"	Argosy	May 7, 1932	Major Brane short story
1932	"The Kid Stacks a Deck"	Detective Fiction Weekly	May 28, 1932	The Patent Leather Kid short story
1932	"Killers Demand Service"	Clues	Approximately May 1932	
1932	"Hell's Danger Signal"	Blue Steel Magazine	June 1932	Paul Pry novelette
1932	"Gunned Out"	Clues	June 1932	Steve Raney novelette
1932	"Cooking Crooks"	Black Mask	June 1932	Ed Jenkins novelette
1932	"Cold Turkey"	Argosy	June 4, 1932	Major Brane short story
1932	"Thieves' Kitchen"	Detective Fiction Weekly	June 4, 1932	Lester Leith novelette
1932	"A Private Affair"	Detective Fiction Weekly	June 25, 1932	Senor Lobo novelette
1932	"The Crippled Corpse"	Dime Detective	July 1932	Dick Bentley novelette
1932	"Rough Stuff"	Black Mask	July 1932	Ed Jenkins novelette
1932	"Closer Than a Brother"	Detective Fiction Weekly	July 9, 1932	Lester Leith novelette
1932	"The Kid Passes the Sugar"	Detective Fiction Weekly	July 16, 1932	The Patent Leather Kid short story
1932	"A Deal in Cement"	Detective Fiction Weekly	July 30, 1932	Lester Leith novelette
1932	"A Blind Date with Death"	Clues	August 1932	Steve Raney novelette
1932	"Loaded with Lead"	Gang World	August 1932	Paul Pry novelette
1932	"The Green Door"	Detective Fiction Weekly	August 20, 1932	Sidney Zoom novelette
1932	"The Law of Drifting Sand"	Argosy	August 30, 1932	Whispering Sands: Bob Zane novelette
1932	"Black and White"	Black Mask	September 1932	Ed Jenkins novelette
1932	"The Kiss of Death"	Clues	September 1932	Steve Raney novelette
1932	"Queen of the Double Cross"	Gang World	September 1932	Paul Pry novelette
1932	"The Kid Wins a Wager"	Detective Fiction Weekly	September 10, 1932	The Patent Leather Kid short story
1932	"Cheating the Chair"	Detective Fiction Weekly	September 17, 1932	Sidney Zoom novelette
1932	"On Two Feet"	Black Mask	October 1932	Bob Larkin novelette
1932	"The Bullet Mob"	Gang World	October 1932	Paul Pry novelette
1932	"The Upside Down Corpse"	Clues	October 1932	Steve Raney novelette
1932	"The Danger Zone"	Argosy	November 15, 1932	Major Brane novelette
1932	"The Kid Throws a Stone"	Detective Fiction Weekly	October 22, 1932	The Patent Leather Kid short story
1932	"Crooked Carnival"	Dime Detective	November 1932	Dane Skarle novelette
1932	"Honest Money"	Black Mask	November 1932	Ken Corning novelette
1932	"False Alarm"	Detective Fiction Weekly	November 5, 1932	Lester Leith novelette
1932	"Trumps"	Detective Fiction Weekly	November 12, 1932	Senor Lobo novelette
1932	"Marked Money"	Dime Detective	December 1932	Dane Skarle novelette
1932	"The Top Comes Off"	Black Mask	December 1932	Ken Corning novelette
1932	"The Law of the Borderland"	Clues	December 1932	Steve Raney novelette
1932	"The Skull Crusher" aka "Hands of Death"	Rapid Fire Detective	December 1932	reprint
1932	"A Clean Getaway"	Detective Fiction Weekly	December 3, 1932	Senor Lobo novelette
1932	"New Worlds"	Argosy	December 17, 1932	
1932	"Juggled Gems"	Detective Fiction Weekly	December 24, 1932	Lester Leith novelette
1932	"Tickets for Two"	Detective Fiction Weekly	December 31, 1932	Senor Lobo novelette
1932	"The Pink Duck"	Argosy	December 31, 1932	Major Brane short story
1932	"Make It Snappy"	Detective Action Stories	Approximately 1932	
1932	"The Cold Kill"	Dime Detective	Approximately 1932	Dick Bentley novelette
1933	"Close Call"	Black Mask	January 1933	Ken Corning novelette
1933	"Framed in Guilt"	Dime Detective	January 1933	Dane Skarle novelette
1933	"Inside Job"	Detective Fiction Weekly	January 7, 1933	Sidney Zoom novelette
1933	"The Spoils of War"	Detective Fiction Weekly	January 14, 1933	Senor Lobo novelette
1933	"Time for Murder"	Dime Detective	January 15, 1933	
1933	"The Land of Painted Rocks"	Argosy	January 28, 1933	Whispering Sands: Bob Zane novelette
1933	"The Dance of the Dagger"	Clues	February 1933	Steve Raney novelette
1933	"Smudge"	All Detective	February 1933	
1933	"The Hour of the Rat"	Black Mask	February 1933	Ed Jenkins novelette
1933	"Frozen Murder"	Dime Detective	February 1933	Small, Weston & Burke novelette
1933	"One Jump Ahead"	Detective Fiction Weekly	February 4, 1933	Lester Leith novelette
1933	"The Kid Makes a Bid"	Detective Fiction Weekly	February 18, 1933	The Patent Leather Kid short story
1933	"Red Jade"	Black Mask	March 1933	Ed Jenkins novelette
1933	"Fingers of Fong"	All Detective	March 1933	
1933	"The Word of a Crook"	Clues	March 1933	
1933	"The Cards of Death" aka "The Blue-Green Death"	Rapid-Fire Detective	March 1, 1933	reprint as Edward Leaming
1933	"The Fall Guy" aka "Framed for a Rap"	Rapid-Fire Detective	March 1, 1933	reprint as Stephen Caldwell
1933	"Law of the Rope"	Argosy	March 11, 1933	Whispering Sands: Bob Zane short story
1933	"Leaden Honeymoon"	Detective Fiction Weekly	March 11, 1933	Senor Lobo novelette
1933	"Early Birds"	Detective Fiction Weekly	March 25, 1933	
1933	"The City of Fear"	All Detective	April 1933	
1933	"Chinatown Murder"	Black Mask	April 1933	Ed Jenkins novelette
1933	"The Radio Ruse"	Detective Fiction Weekly	April 1, 1933	Lester Leith novelette
1933	"Death's Doorway"	Dime Detective	April 1, 1933	Go Get 'Em Garver novelette
1933	"The Kid Muscles In"	Detective Fiction Weekly	April 15, 1933	The Patent Leather Kid short story
1933	"The Dance of the Snakes"	Dime Detective	April 15, 1933	Small, Weston & Burke novelette
1933	"Law of the Ghost Town"	Argosy	April 22, 1933	Whispering Sands: Bob Zane short story
1933	"A Logical Ending"	Detective Fiction Weekly	April 29, 1933	
1933	"Both Ends"	All Detective	May 1933	
1933	"The Weapons of a Crook"	Black Mask	May 1933	Ed Jenkins novelette
1933	"States Evidence" aka "Yellow Claws"	Rapid-Fire Detective	May 1, 1933	reprint as Carl Franklin Ruth
1933	"A Point of Honor" aka "The Ghost-Crook"	Rapid-Fire Detective	May 1, 1933	reprint as Edward Leaming
1933	"Results"	Detective Fiction Weekly	May 6, 1933	Senor Lobo novelette
1933	"The Kid Takes a Cut"	Detective Fiction Weekly	May 20, 1933	The Patent Leather Kid short story
1933	"The Watchful Eyes of Taiping"	Argosy	May 27, 1933	Major Brane short story
1933	"Murder Apprentice"	All Detective	June 1933	Dudley Bell novelette
1933	"Making the Breaks"	Black Mask	June 1933	Ken Corning novelette
1933	"Dead Man's Diamonds"	Dime Detective	June 1, 1933	Go Get 'Em Garver novelette
1933	"Thin Ice"	Detective Fiction Weekly	June 10, 1933	Lester Leith novelette
1933	"The Hand of Horror"	Dime Detective	June 15–July 1, 1933	
1933	"Carved in Sand"	Argosy	June 17, 1933	Whispering Sands: Bob Zane novelette
1933	"Catch as Catch Can"	All Detective	July 1933	
1933	"Devil's Fire"	Black Mask	July 1933	Ken Corning novelette
1933	"Crooks' Vacation"	Detective Fiction Weekly	July 8, 1933	Lester Leith novelette
1933	"As Far as the Poles"	Short Stories	July 25, 1933	
1933	"Blackmail with Lead"	Black Mask	August 1933	Ken Corning novelette
1933	"The Broken Link"	All Detective	August 1933	Dudley Bell short story
1933	"Night Birds"	Argosy	August 5, 1933	El Paisano novelette
1933	"The Kid Beats the Gun"	Detective Fiction Weekly	August 5, 1933	The Patent Leather Kid novelette
1933	"Whispering Justice"	Black Mask	September 1933	Ed Jenkins novelette
1933	"Second-Story Law"	All Detective	September 1933	Bob Crowder short story
1933	"Dressed to Kill"	Dime Detective	September 1, 1933	Paul Pry short story
1933	"The Big Circle"	Argosy	September 2, 1933	Whispering Sands: Bob Zane novelette
1933	"Snatch as Snatch Can"	Dime Detective	September 15, 1933	Paul Pry novelette
1933	"The Sirens of War"	Detective Fiction Weekly	September 16, 1933	Senor Lobo novelette
1933	"The Clearing House of Crime"	Clues	October 1933	Perry Burke—The Clearing House of Crime short story
1933	"Committee of One"	All Detective	October 1933	
1933	"The Murder Push"	Black Mask	October 1933	Ed Jenkins novelette
1933	"The Crimson Scorpion"	Dime Detective	October 15, 1933	Small, Weston & Burke novelette
1933	"Lifted Bait"	Detective Fiction Weekly	October 21, 1933	Sidney Zoom novelette
1933	"Pitched Battle"	Clues	November 1933	Perry Burke—The Clearing House of Crime short story
1933	"Restless Pearls"	All Detective	November 1933	Bob Crowder short story
1933	"The Maniac Mystery"	Strange Detective	November 1933	
1933	"The Kid Covers a Kill"	Detective Fiction Weekly	November 4, 1933	The Patent Leather Kid novelette
1933	"Dominoes of Death"	Short Stories	November 10, 1933	
1933	"Border Justice"	Argosy	November 11, 1933	El Paisano novelette
1933	"The Cross-Stitch Killer"	Dime Detective	November 15, 1933	Paul Pry novelette
1933	"Costs of Collection"	Detective Fiction Weekly	November 18, 1933	Senor Lobo novelette
1933	"Behind the Mask"	All Detective	December 1933	Bob Crowder short story
1933	"Dead Men's Shoes"	Black Mask	December 1933	Ed Jenkins novelette
1933	"The Burden of Proof"	Detective Fiction Weekly	December 2, 1933	Lester Leith novelette
1933	"Hard-Boiled" aka "With Both Fists"	Rapid-Fire Detective	December 1, 1933	reprint as Stephen Caldwell
1934	"A Guest of the House"	Black Mask	January 1934	Ed Jenkins novelette
1934	"Terror Trail"	Strange Detective Stories	January 2, 1934	as Les Tillray
1934	"The Code of a Fighter"	Detective Fiction Weekly	January 27, 1934	Senor Lobo novelette
1934	"The Jack of Death"	All Detective	February 1934	Bob Crowder novelette
1934	"The Kid Clears a Crook"	Detective Fiction Weekly	February 3, 1934	The Patent Leather Kid novelette
1934	"The Lizard's Cage"	Argosy	February 10, 1934	El Paisano novelette
1934	"Lost, Strayed and Stolen"	Detective Fiction Weekly	February 24, 1934	Lester Leith novelette
1934	"Lawless Waters"	Short Stories	February 25, 1934	
1934	"Cop Killers"	Black Mask	March 1934	Ed Jenkins novelette
1934	"Silent Death"	All Detective	March 1934	
1934	"The Ivory Casket"	Argosy	March 17, 1934	Major Brane novelette
1934	"New Twenties"	Black Mask	April 1934	Ed Jenkins novelette
1934	"Chiseler's Choice"	Dime Detective	April 1, 1934	
1934	"A Matter of Accounting"	Argosy	April 12, 1934	El Paisano novelette
1934	"The Kid Clips a Coupon"	Detective Fiction Weekly	April 21, 1934	The Patent Leather Kid novelette
1934	"Silver Strands of Death"	Super Detective	May 1934	
1934	"The Smoking Corpse"	Dime Detective	May 1, 1934	
1934	"Broken Eggs"	Detective Fiction Weekly	May 5, 1934	Senor Lobo novelette
1934	"Proofs of Death"	Argosy	May 12, 1934	Major Brane novelette
1934	"Stolen Thunder"	Detective Fiction Weekly	May 19, 1934	Sidney Zoom novelette
1934	"Burnt Fingers"	Black Mask	June 1934	Ed Jenkins novelette
1934	"The Face Lifter"	All Detective	June 1934	
1934	"Dead to Rights"	Detective Fiction Weekly	June 2, 1934	Lester Leith novelette
1934	"White Rings"	Argosy	June 30, 1934	Jax Bowman—White Rings novelette
1934	"Crocodile Tears"	Detective Fiction Weekly	June 30, 1934	Lester Leith novelette
1934	"The War Lord of Darkness"	Adventure	July 1934	
1934	"The Kid Cooks a Goose"	Detective Fiction Weekly	July 14, 1934	The Patent Leather Kid novelette
1934	"Sand Blast"	Argosy	July 21, 1934	Whispering Sands: Bob Zane novelette
1934	"The Heavenly Rat"	Black Mask	September 1934	Ed Jenkins novelette
1934	"Hundred Grand"	This Week	September 9–October 28, 1934	
1934	"No Quarter"	Argosy	September 22, 1934	Jax Bowman—White Rings novelette
1934	"The Man Who Couldn't Forget"	All Detective	October 1934	The Man Who Couldn't Forget novelette
1934	"Opportunity Knocks Twice"	Detective Fiction Weekly	October 27, 1934	Senor Lobo novelette
1934	"Hot Cash"	Black Mask	November 1934	Ed Jenkins novelette
1934	"The Kid Steals a Star"	Detective Fiction Weekly	November 17, 1934	The Patent Leather Kid novelette
1934	"The Purring Doom"	Dime Detective	December 1934	Smith, Weston & Burke novelette
1934	"The Black Egg"	Short Stories	December 10, 1934	
1934	"Suicide House"	Dime Detective	December 15, 1934	Smith, Weston & Burke novelette
1935	"Winged Lead"	Black Mask	January 1935	Black Barr novelette
1935	"Hard as Nails"	Dime Detective	January 15, 1935	
1935	"Queens Wild"	Detective Fiction Weekly	January 26, 1935	Lester Leith novelette
1935	"Strong Medicine"	Argosy	January 26, 1935	El Paisano novelette
1935	"The Vault of Death"	All Detective	March 9, 1935	The Man Who Couldn't Forget novelette
1935	"Murder Bait"	Dime Detective	March 15, 1935	
1935	"A Chance to Cheat"	Black Mask	May 1935	Ed Jenkins novelette
1935	"Fugitive Gold"	This Week	May 26–July 27, 1935	Basis of the film Special Investigator (1936)
1935	"The Man in the Silver Mask"	Detective Fiction Weekly	July 13, 1935	The Man in the Silver Mask novelette
1935	"Crimson Jade"	Dime Detective	September 1935	
1935	"The Man Who Talked"	Detective Fiction Weekly	September 7, 1935	The Man in the Silver Mask novelette
1935	"Bunched Knuckles"	Argosy	September 21, 1935	Jax Bowman—White Rings novelette
1935	"Cash and Carry"	Black Mask	October 1935	Ed Jenkins novelette
1935	"Face Down"	Photoplay	October 1935–March 1936	Dick Brent novelette as Charles J. Kenny
1935	"Screaming Sirens"	Detective Fiction Weekly	November 2, 1935	Lester Leith novelette
1935	"The Silver Mask Murders"	Detective Fiction Weekly	November 23, 1935	The Man in the Silver Mask novelette
1935	"Above the Law"	Black Mask	December 1935	Ed Jenkins novelette
1935	"The Frame-Up"	This Week	December 15, 1935 – January 19, 1936	
1936	"Slated to Die"	Argosy	January 11, 1936	
1936	"Bald-Headed Row"	Detective Fiction Weekly	March 21, 1936	Lester Leith novelette
1936	"Come-On Girl"	The American Magazine	May 1936	Sam Moraine novelette
1936	"Beating the Bulls"	Black Mask	May 1936	Ed Jenkins novelette
1936	"Complete Designs"	Short Stories	July 25, 1936	
1936	"Teeth of the Dragon"	This Week	September 15–October 18, 1936	
1936	"Two Sticks of Death"	Dime Detective	November 1936	Smith, Weston & Burke novelette
1937	"This Way Out"	Black Mask	March 1937	Ed Jenkins novelette
1937	"Under the Knife"	This Week	March 21–April 11, 1937	Win Layton—Girl Reporter novelette
1937	"Among Thieves"	Black Mask	September 1937	Pete Wennick novelette
1938	"Blind Date with Death"	This Week	January 30–February 20, 1938	Win Layton—Girl Reporter novelette
1938	"Leg Man"	Black Mask	February 1938	Pete Wennick novelette
1938	"Muscle Out"	Black Mask	April 1938	Ed Jenkins novelette
1938	"Twice in a Row"	Cosmopolitan	June 1938	
1938	"The Finishing Touch"	Dime Detective	August 1938	Paul Pry novelette
1938	"The Case of the Hollywood Scandal"	Photoplay	September 1938–January 1939	
1938	"The House of Three Candles"	This Week	November 6, 1938	
1938	"Planted Planets"	Detective Story	December 1938	Lester Leith novelette
1938	"Barney Killigen"	Clues	December 1938	Barney Killigen novelette
1939	"The Monkey Murder"	Detective Story	January 1939	Lester Leith novelette
1939	"Without Gloves"	Clues	January 1939	Barney Killigen novelette
1939	"It's the McCoy"	Dime Detective	January 1939	Paul Pry novelette
1939	"Unstuffing One Shirt"	Clues	February 1939	Barney Killigen novelette
1939	"The Seven Sinister Sombreros"	Detective Story	February 1939	Lester Leith novelette
1939	"The Joss of Tai Wong"	Adventure	March 1939	
1939	"The Fourth Musketeer"	Detective Story	March 1939	Lester Leith novelette
1939	"Take It or Leave It"	Black Mask	March 1939	Pete Wennick novelette
1939	"The Rhyme and Reason"	Detective Story	April 1939	Lester Leith novelette
1939	"The Queen of Shanghai Night"	Detective Story	May 1939	Lester Leith novelette
1939	"Dogs of Death"	Clues	May 1939	Barney Killigen novelette
1939	"The Eyebrow Moon"	Toronto Star Weekly	May 13, 1939	
1939	"The Ring of Fiery Eyes"	Detective Story	August 1939	Lester Leith novelette
1939	"Dark Alleys"	Black Mask	September 1939	Ed Jenkins novelette
1939	"Lester Leith, Magician" aka "The Hand is Quicker Than the Eye"	Detective Fiction Weekly	September 16, 1939	Lester Leith novelette
1939	"A Thousand to One"	Detective Fiction Weekly	October 28, 1939	Lester Leith novelette
1939	"Mystery by Inches"	Toronto Star Weekly	October 28–December 23, 1939	
1939	"A Hearse for Hollywood"	Double Detective	November 1939	Jax Keen novelette
1939	"Fair Exchange"	Detective Fiction Weekly	November 18, 1939	Lester Leith novelette
1939	"A Headache for Butch"	Double Detective	December 1939	Ed Migrane, the Headache, novelette
1939	"At Arm's Length"	Detective Fiction Weekly	December 9, 1939	Jerry Marr, P. I.
1939	"Where Angels Fear to Tread"	Detective Fiction Weekly	December 30, 1939	
1940	"Two-Way Ride"	Double Detective	January 1940	Ed Migrane, the Headache, novelette
1940	"Sugar"	Detective Fiction Weekly	January 20, 1940	Lester Leith novelette
1940	"Sleeping Dogs"	Double Detective	February 1940	Jax Keen novelette
1940	"Hot Guns"	Double Detective	March 1940	Ed Migrane, the Headache, novelette
1940	"Monkeyshine"	Detective Fiction Weekly	March 16, 1940	Lester Leith novelette
1940	"Indian Magic"	This Week	May 5, 1940	
1940	"Tong Trouble"	Black Mask	June 1940	Ed Jenkins novelette
1940	"The Alibi Girl" aka "The Copper and His Alibi"	Sketch	October 1940	
1940	"Jade Sanctuary"	Black Mask	December 1940	Ed Jenkins novelette
1941	"The Exact Opposite"	Detective Fiction Weekly	March 29, 1941	Lester Leith novelette
1941	"The Phantom Crook"	Black Mask	May 1941	Ed Jenkins novelette
1941	"The Last Bell on the Street"	The Saturday Evening Post	May 3, 1941	Peter Quint short story
1941	"That's a Woman For You!"	The Saturday Evening Post	May 31, 1941	Peter Quint short story
1941	"The Big Squeeze"	The Saturday Evening Post	November 15, 1941	Peter Quint short story
1941	"A Sugar Coating"	Flynn's Detective Fiction	November 29, 1941	Lester Leith novelette
1941	"Rain Check"	Black Mask	December 1941	Ed Jenkins novelette
1941	"Marry for Money"	Toronto Star Weekly	May 4, 1941	as Grant Holiday
1942	"Two Dead Hands"	Black Mask	April 1942	Ed Jenkins novelette
1943	"The False Fire"	This Week	December 6, 1942	
1943	"Something Like a Pelican"	Flynn's Detective Fiction	January 1943	Lester Leith novelette
1943	"The Incredible Mr. Smith"	Black Mask	March 1943	Ed Jenkins novelette
1943	"Average American"	This Week	April 18, 1943	
1943	"Caws and Effect" aka "The Black Feather"	Flynn's Detective Fiction	July 1943	Lester Leith novelette
1943	"The Gong of Vengeance"	Black Mask	September 1943	Ed Jenkins novelette
1944	"The Eyes of China"	This Week	October 29, 1944	
1945	"Death Rides a Boxcar" aka "Over the Hump"	The American Magazine	January 1945	
1945	"Clues Don't Count" aka "The Clue of the Runaway Blonde"	The Country Gentleman	July–October 1945	Sheriff Bill Eldon novelette
1946	"White Canary"	This Week	September 15, 1946	
1946	"A Man is Missing"	The American Magazine	November 1946	
1947	"Too Many Clues"	The Country Gentleman	February–May 1947	Sheriff Bill Eldon novelette
1949	"The Clue of the Screaming Woman"	The Country Gentleman	January–April 1949	Sheriff Bill Eldon novelette (Note: Reprinted in the 1979 anthology, Ellery Queen's Secrets of Mystery)
1949	"The Affair of the Reluctant Witness"	Argosy	April 1949	Jerry Bane short story
1949	"The Affair of the Pearl Princess"	Argosy	November 1949	Jerry Bane novelette
1950	"The Law That Leaked"	Sports Afield	September–December 1950	
1951	"The Corpse Was in the Countinghouse"	Collier's	March 3–31, 1951	
1952	"Flight into Disaster" aka "Only by Running"	This Week	May 11–18, 1952	
1952	"The Jeweled Butterfly"	Cosmopolitan	October 1952	
1954	"Protection" aka "Danger Out of the Past"	Manhunt	May 1955	
1957	"The Case of the Murderer's Bride"	Look	October 15, 1957	
1965	"Desert Justice"	Desert Magazine	April–May 1965	

=== Collections ===
Year	Title	Publisher	Publication date	Notes
1947	Two Clues	Morrow	February 1947	Sheriff Bill Eldon book includes "The Clue of the Runaway Blonde" (originally titled "Clues Don't Count") and "The Clue of the Hungry Horse"
1969	The Bird in the Hand and Four Other Stories	Walter J. Black	1969	Ellery Queen's Mystery Club Edition of five Lester Leith mysteries: "The Bird in the Hand", "In Round Figures", "The Exact Opposite", "A Tip From Scuttle" and "The Monkey Murder"
1969	The Case of the Murderer's Bride and Other Stories	Davis Publications	1969	Edited by Ellery Queen; includes "The Case of the Murderer's Bride", "The Candy Kid", "Death Rides a Boxcar", "The Jeweled Butterfly", "Only By Running" (originally titled "Flight into Disaster"), "To Strike a Match" (originally titled "The House of Three Candles") and "Danger Out of the Past" (originally titled "Protection")
1971	The Case of the Crimson Kiss: A Perry Mason Novelette, and Other Stories	Morrow	March 3, 1971	Perry Mason novelette "The Case of the Crimson Kiss", with "Crooked Lightning", "The Valley of Little Fears", "Fingers of Fong" and "At Arm's Length"
1971	The Case of the Crying Swallow: A Perry Mason Novelette, and Other Stories	Morrow	June 8, 1971	Perry Mason novelette "The Case of the Crying Swallow", with "The Candy Kid", "The Vanishing Corpse" and "The Affair of the Reluctant Witness"
1972	The Case of the Irate Witness: A Perry Mason Mystery and Other Stories	Morrow	March 3, 1972	Perry Mason novelette "The Case of the Irate Witness", with "The Jeweled Butterfly", "Something Like a Pelican" and "A Man is Missing"
1980	Ellery Queen Presents The Amazing Adventures of Lester Leith	Davis Publications	1980	Five Lester Leith mysteries: "The Bird in the Hand", "In Round Figures", "The Exact Opposite", "A Thousand to One" and "The Hand is Quicker Than the Eye" (previously published as "Lester Leith, Magician")
1981	Whispering Sands—Stories of Gold Fever and the Western Desert	Morrow	1981	Nine stories, seven featuring Bob Zane: "Sand Blast", "Law of the Rope", "Gold Blindness", "Written in Sand", "Blood-Red Gold", "Carved in Sand", "Fall Guy", "Priestess of the Sun" and "Golden Bullets"
1981	The Human Zero: The Science Fiction Stories of Erle Stanley Gardner	Morrow	1981	Stories originally published in Argosy 1928–32: "The Human Zero", "Monkey Eyes", "New Worlds", "Rain Magic", "A Year in a Day", "The Man with Pin-Point Eyes" and "The Sky's the Limit"
1983	Pay Dirt and Other Whispering Sands Stories of Gold Fever and the Western Desert	Morrow	1983	Nine Bob Zane stories: "Singing Sand", "The Land of Painted Rocks", "The Big Circle", "Pay Dirt", "The Land of Poison Springs", "Stamp of the Desert", "Law of the Ghost Town", "The Law of Drifting Sand" and "The Whip Hand"
1989	The Adventures of Paul Pry	Mysterious Press	1989	Nine Paul Pry stories: "The Crime Juggler", "The Racket Buster", "The Daisy Pusher", "Wiker Gets the Works", "A Double Deal in Diamonds", "Slick and Clean", "Hell's Danger Signal", "Dressed to Kill" and "The Cross-Stitch Killer"
1990	Dead Men's Letters	Carroll & Graf	1990	Six Ed Jenkins novelettes: "Dead Men's Letters", "Laugh That Off", "The Cat-Woman", "This Way Out", "Come and Get It" and "In Full Account"
1990	The Blonde in Lower Six	Carroll & Graf	1990	Ed Jenkins novel, "The Blonde in Lower Six", and three novelettes: "The Wax Dragon", "Grinning Gods" and "Yellow Shadows"
1991	Honest Money and Other Short Novels	Carroll & Graf	1991	Six Ken Corning stories: "Honest Money", "The Top Comes Off", "Close Call", "Making the Breaks", "Devil's Fire" and "Blackmail with Lead"
2004	The Danger Zone and Other Stories	Crippen & Landru Publishers	2004	"Snowy Ducks for Cover", "The Corkscrew Kid", "The Danger Zone", "A Logical Ending", "Restless Pearls", "Time for Murder", "Hard as Nails", "Complete Designs", "Barney Killigen", "Take It or Leave It" and "Flight into Disaster"
2006	The Casebook of Sidney Zoom	Crippen & Landru Publishers	2006	"Willie the Weeper", "My Name is Zoom!", "Borrowed Bullets", "Higher Up", "The First Stone", "The Green Door", "Cheating the Chair", "Inside Job", "Lifted Bait" and "Stolen Thunder"
2009	All Detective Magazine: An Erle Stanley Gardner Special	Pulp Tales Press	2009	"Smudge", "Fingers of Fong", "Both Ends", "City of Fear", "Catch as Catch Can", "Murder Apprentice" and "Committee of One"
2010	The Exploits of the Patent Leather Kid	Crippen & Landru Publishers	2010	"The Kid Stacks a Deck", "The Kid Passes the Sugar", "The Kid Wins a Wager", "The Kid Throws a Stone", "The Kid Makes a Bid", "The Kid Muscles In", "The Kid Takes a Cut", "The Kid Beats the Gun", "The Kid Covers a Kill", "The Kid Clears a Crook", "The Kid Clips a Coupon", "The Kid Cooks a Goose" and "The Kid Steals a Star"
2020	Hot Cash, Cold Clews	Crippen & Landru Publishers	2020	Lester Leith stories
2026	According to Law: The Complete Black Mask Cases of Ed Jenkins: Volume 1: 1925–26	Black Mask	July 2026	First seven Ed Jenkins stories; introduction by John Wooley; "Beyond the Law", "Hard as Nails", "Not So Darned Bad", "Three O'Clock in the Morning", "The Triple Cross", "According to Law", and "Register Rage"

== Non-fiction ==
=== Travel ===
Year	Title	Publisher	Publication date	Notes
1948	The Land of Shorter Shadows	Morrow	April 1948	
1954	Neighborhood Frontiers	Morrow	November 1954	
1960	Hunting the Desert Whale	Morrow	December 1960	Sports Afield (excerpts), November 1960 – January 1961
1961	Hovering Over Baja	Morrow	December 1961	Sports Afield (excerpts), September 1961
1962	The Hidden Heart of Baja	Morrow	November 1962	
1963	The Desert is Yours	Morrow	December 1963	Desert Magazine (excerpts), November–December 1963; Sports Afield (excerpts), December 1963
1964	The World of Water	Morrow	December 1964	
1965	Hunting Lost Mines by Helicopter	Morrow	November 1965	
1967	Off the Beaten Track in Baja	Morrow	April 1967	
1967	Gypsy Days on the Delta	Morrow	October 1967	
1968	Mexico's Magic Square	Morrow	November 1968	
1969	Drifting Down the Delta	Morrow	January 1969	
1969	Host With the Big Hat	Morrow	December 1969	

=== Crime ===
Year	Title	Publisher	Publication date	Notes
1952	The Court of Last Resort	William Sloane Associates	November 1952	Edgar Award, Best Fact Crime; Pocket Books, 1954 revised and expanded Basis of the NBC-TV series (October 4, 1957 – April 11, 1958); scripts edited by Gardner
1970	Cops on Campus and Crime in the Streets	Morrow	January 30, 1970	Serialized by the Chicago Tribune-New York News syndicate, January 25 – February 5, 1970

An article titled "My Casebook of True Crime—Introduction" (September 4, 1955) began a series of 28 non-fiction articles Gardner wrote for The American Weekly.

=== Writing ===
Year	Title	Publisher	Publication date	Notes
1925	letter	The Author & Journalist	November 1925	first known letter in a writers' mag
1928	letter	Three Star Magazine	July 1928	background of his western story in the issue
1931	"What Chance Has the New Writer"	Writer's Digest	January 1931	first known writers' mag article
1932	"Local Color"	Writer's Digest	January 1932	
1932	"Let's Go!"	The Author & Journalist	October 1932	
1937	"Doing It the Hard Way"	The Writer's 1937 Year Book	February 1937	
1939	"They Wanted 'Horror' "	Writer's Digest	August 1939	analysis of conditions in the pulp field
1965	"Getting Away With Murder"	The Atlantic Monthly	January 1965	remembrance of the start of his career
1965	"Speed Dash"	The Atlantic Monthly	June 1965	creating a popular character in the 1920s
1966	"My Stories of the Wild West"	The Atlantic Monthly	July 1966	

== Books about Erle Stanley Gardner ==
- 1947: Johnston, Alva. The Case of Erle Stanley Gardner. New York, William Morrow and Company, 1947. OCLC 1371188
- 1978: Hughes, Dorothy B. Erle Stanley Gardner: The Case of the Real Perry Mason. New York: William Morrow and Company, 1978. ISBN 0-688-03282-6
- 1980: Fugate, Francis L., and Roberta B. Fugate. Secrets of the World's Best-Selling Writer: The Storytelling Techniques of Erle Stanley Gardner. New York: William Morrow and Company, 1980. ISBN 0-688-03701-1
