= Whistling in the Dark =

Whistling in the Dark may refer to:

== Books ==
- Whistling in the Dark: a doubter's dictionary, a 1988 book by Frederick Buechner
- Whistling in the Dark: True Stories and Other Fables, a 1992 book by George Garrett
- Whistling in the Dark: In Pursuit of the Nightingale, a 1993 book by Richard Mabey

== Film and theatre ==
- Whistling in the Dark (play), play by Laurence Gross and Edward Childs Carpenter
- Whistling in the Dark (1933 film), a comedy crime film adapted from the play of the same title
- Whistling in the Dark (1941 film), another adaptation of the play, starring Red Skelton

== Music ==
=== Albums ===
- Whistling in the Dark (album), a 1979 album by Max Gronenthal, also known as Max Carl
- Whistling in The Dark, a 2008 album by Hank Wangford & The Lost Cowboys
- Whistling in the Dark, a 2006 album by Terry Garland

=== Songs ===
- "Whistling in the Dark", a song by Easterhouse
- "Whistling in the Dark", a song by They Might Be Giants from Flood
