= Jasper Deeter =

American stage and film actor

Jasper Deeter (July 31, 1893 – May 1972) was an American-born stage and film actor, stage director, and founder of Hedgerow Theatre in Rose Valley, Pennsylvania, one of the first regional repertory theatres in the United States.

== Career ==
Deeter gained prominence in the theatre world in the 1919 production of Eugene O'Neill's Exorcism: A Play in One Act. A close relationship with O'Neill ensued, and Deeter joined the Provincetown Players, which was an experimental theatre group that produced many of O'Neill's one-act and full-length plays in New York City. Deeter appeared in several of O'Neill's plays, including The Hairy Ape and The Emperor Jones. Deeter is credited with convincing the playwright to cast a black actor, Charles Sidney Gilpin, in the lead role of Brutus Jones in The Emperor Jones. The play marked the first time that a major black role in a New York production was not performed by an actor in blackface.

Deeter left New York as frictions between members of the company arose as a result of what many saw as a commercialization of the plays produced by the Provincetown Players. Many of the original members, including Deeter, believed commercial success to be at odds with the Provincetown Players' mission to create experimental works that weren't judged by box office numbers. He travelled to Rose Valley, Pennsylvania, where he became involved with the Rose Valley Arts and Crafts Community.

It was here that Deeter found artisans and craftsmen such as Wharton Esherick, Elenore Plaisted Abbott, and others who built theatre set pieces, provided scenic artwork, and designed costumes. He also attracted the talents of actors such as Ann Harding, Eva LaGallienne, and Phil Price Jr. Throughout its heyday from the late 1920s to the 1950s, Hedgerow Theatre presented plays by the leading playwrights of the time, including O'Neill, George Bernard Shaw, and Langston Hughes.

In 1958, Deeter appeared in the role of the Civic Defense Volunteer in the cult classic The Blob, and in 1959, he had a leading part in the sci-fi thriller 4D Man. In his later years, he remained active with the theatre and died in Media, PA in 1972 at the age of 78.
