= The Bachelor Father =

1931 film

- Screenshot
- Directed by: Robert Z. Leonard
- Screenplay by: Laurence E. Johnson; Frances Marion (uncredited)
- Based on: "The Bachelor Father"; 1928 play by Edward Childs Carpenter
- Produced by: Marion Davies, Robert Z. Leonard
- Starring: Marion Davies
- Cinematography: Oliver T. Marsh
- Edited by: Harry Reynolds
- Distributed by: Metro-Goldwyn-Mayer
- Release date: January 10, 1931
- Running time: 90 minutes
- Country: United States
- Language: English

The Bachelor Father is a 1931 American pre-Code MGM comedy drama film directed by Robert Z. Leonard and starring Marion Davies and featuring Ralph Forbes, C. Aubrey Smith, Ray Milland and Guinn "Big Boy" Williams. It was based on a same-titled play by Edward Childs Carpenter, with Smith re-creating his role from the Broadway production. The plot centers around a stuffy British nobleman whose three grown (and illegitimate) children suddenly arrive at his estate and decide to move in with him.

== Plot ==
Sir Basil Algernon Winterton is an elderly, never-married baronet who decides to bring together his three illegitimate children, scattered around the world, on a whim. He assigns his young friend John Ashley the task. Antoinette "Tony" Flagg is an American showgirl whose mother died when she was young. She was raised by Mrs. Berney, along with Mrs. Berney's son, Richard. Mrs. Berney, seeing this as a wonderful opportunity for Tony, keeps a secret from her.

Tony goes to England. There, she meets her half-siblings, Geoffrey Trent and Maria Credaro, and together they see their father for the first time. They at first mistake him for a fish monger (as he is returning from fishing) and are engaging in youthful hijinks, making a bad first impression. While initially he bristles at their behaviour, with Tony especially trying his patience, he soon comes to love them all. Also, Tony and John fall in love.

One day, Richard comes to England to attempt a dangerous flight over the Atlantic Ocean. He visits and tells Tony the secret: she is not Sir Basil's daughter. That was her half-sister, 20 years deceased. While she tries to tell Sir Basil, she discovers that both Maria and Geoffrey are leaving; Maria has been offered a wonderful singing job. That and his love for her (and hers in return) prevent her from doing so. It eventually comes out when Sir Basil's lawyer, Mr. Creswell, discovers the truth and informs his employer. She tries to explain her behavior, but neither Sir Basil nor John are in a forgiving mood.

Heartbroken, Tony persuades Richard to let her come along on his risky trans-Atlantic flight back to New York. Meanwhile, John has had second thoughts and still wants to marry Tony. Sir Basil, hearing about Tony's recklessness, realizes how much he cares for her and dispatches John to try to stop her. He is too late, but the overloaded airplane crashes into trees just off the end of the runway. Richard and Tony escape serious injury, and John brings Tony back for a reconciliation. When John insists on marrying Tony right away, Sir Basil objects strongly. Tony solves the problem by saying she will be Sir Basil's daughter during the day and John's wife at night.

== Cast (in credits order) ==
- Marion Davies as Tony Flagg
- Ralph Forbes as John Ashley
- C. Aubrey Smith as Sir Basil Algernon Winterton
- Ray Milland as Geoffrey Trent
- Guinn "Big Boy" Williams as Richard Berney
- David Torrence as Dr Frank MacDonald
- Doris Lloyd as Mrs Julia Webb
- Edgar Norton as Bolton, one of Sir Basil's butlers
- Nina Quartero as Maria Credaro
- Halliwell Hobbes as Larkin, one of Sir Basil's butlers
- James Gordon as Carson Creswell

== Foreign-language version ==
One foreign-language version was produced by MGM in French and was entitled Le père célibataire. It was released in 1931 and starred Lili Damita.
