= Helen Knipe Carpenter =

American novelist

- Born: December 6, 1881; Philadelphia, Pennsylvania, US
- Died: February 15, 1959 (aged 77); Torrington, Connecticut, US
- Occupations: Illustrator, writer
- Years active: 1906–1942

Helen Knipe Carpenter (December 6, 1881 – February 15, 1959) was an illustrator and writer active in the early 20th century noted for her Art Nouveau illustrations and her adaptations of stage plays to novels.

Born Helen Alden Knipe on December 6, 1881, in Philadelphia, Pennsylvania, a granddaughter of the novelist T. S. Arthur, she studied at the Pennsylvania Academy of the Fine Arts under the tutelage of William Merritt Chase, Hugh Henry Brackenridge and Thomas Pollock Anshutz.

She married writer, playwright, and director Edward Childs Carpenter on June 1, 1907, in Philadelphia where they lived and worked for a number of years, summering in Connecticut.

Her works span the period from the late Art Nouveau period through the 1940s.

== Works ==
- Illustrator

| Year | Title |
|---|---|
| 1906 | Idelle Phelps, Your Health |
| 1907 | Dwight Burroughs, Jack, the Giant Killer, Jr. with Elenore Plaisted Abbott |
| 1908 | Millicent Olmsted, The Land of Never Was, Being the Adventures of Great-A, Little-a, and Bouncing B with Elenore Plaisted Abbott |
| 1909 | Millicent Olmsted, The Land of Really True, Being the Everyday Life of Great-A, Little-a, and Bouncing B with Elenore Plaisted Abbott |
| 1911 | Elbridge Hosmer Sabin, The Magical Man of Mirth with Elenore Plaisted Abbott |
| 1911 | Elbridge Hosmer Sabin, Queen of the City of Mirth with Elenore Plaisted Abbott |
| 1920 | Nathaniel Hawthorne, A Wonder Book and Tanglewood Tales with Elenore Plaisted Abbott |

- Author

| Year | Title |
|---|---|
| 1916 | The Cinderella Man, A Romance of Youth (book), based on the stage play by Edward Childs Carpenter |
| 1932 | Whistling in the Dark (book), based on the stage play by Laurence Gross and Edward Childs Carpenter |
| 1942 | Shylock's Daughter (play), with Edward Childs Carpenter |

Carpenter died on February 15, 1959, in Litchfield, Connecticut. She and her husband Edward Childs Carpenter are interred in Town Hill Cemetery in New Hartford, Connecticut.
