= Laurence Gross (playwright) =

American playwright

Laurence Gross (15 January 1889 – 28 February 1965) was an American playwright. He is best known for co-writing the play Whistling in the Dark (1932).

== Bibliography ==
The son of Mark N. and Bertha Gumberts Gross, Laurence Mark Gross was born in Evansville, Indiana on 15 January 1889. His father was a tailor who operated the business Mark N. Goss & Sons on Main St. in Evansville. His family was Jewish, and his grandfather, Nathan Gross, was a founding member of Congregation Adath B'nai Israel in 1858.

Gross attended Canal School (later called Wheeler School) where he gave dramatic recitations at school events. He graduated from Evansville Central High School. By 1906 he was working as the head ad writer for The Evansville Journal-News. He went on to work in the art and editorial departments of that paper. He initially planned on being a cartoonist, and worked in that capacity for the paper. He developed an interest in becoming an actor and wanted to study drama at the University of Michigan, but his father refused to financially support that endeavor and he entered a career in the furniture business instead.

At around the age of 20 Gross relocated to Canton, Ohio where he worked as a furniture buyer. He subsequently worked in this same capacity for the Boston Store in Milwaukee, Wisconsin while simultaneously writing plays. In 1930 his first play, The Conquering Male, was given its premiere at the Broadstreet Theatre in Newark, New Jersey in a production backed by producer Archibald Selwyn and directed by Colonel Stanley Bell. The cast was led by Ernest Lawford as Sir Guy and Madge Evans as Phyllis. It transferred to the Apollo Theatre in Atlantic City.

With Edward Childs Carpenter, Gross co-wrote the play Whistling in the Dark. It had a successful run on Broadway in the 1932-1933 season at first the Ethel Barrymore Theatre and then the Waldorf Theatre. It was given collectively 265 performances between the two theaters. The play was subsequently adapted twice into Hollywood films: Whistling in the Dark (1933) and Whistling in the Dark (1941). It also had a long life as a touring show across the United States and was revived in American regional theatre.

Gross was active in the little theater movement in Milwaukee where several more of his plays were staged. He was married three times, and retired in the early 1940s. He died in Milwaukee on 28 February 1965.
