= Whistling in the Dark (1933 film) =

1933 film by Charles Reisner, Elliott Nugent

- Directed by: Elliott Nugent; Charles Reisner (uncredited co-director)
- Screenplay by: Elliott Nugent
- Based on: Whistling in the Dark; 1932 play by Laurence Gross; Edward Childs Carpenter
- Produced by: Norbert Brodine
- Starring: Ernest Truex; Una Merkel; Edward Arnold
- Cinematography: Norbert Brodine
- Edited by: Ben Lewis
- Music by: William Axt
- Production company: Metro-Goldwyn-Mayer
- Distributed by: Metro-Goldwyn-Mayer
- Release date: January 21, 1933 (US)
- Running time: 76-79 minutes
- Country: United States
- Language: English

Whistling in the Dark (U.S. television title: Scared!) is a 1933 American pre-Code comedy-mystery film directed by Elliott Nugent and starring Ernest Truex and Una Merkel. The plot concerns a mystery writer whose scheme for a perfect murder comes to the attention of a gangster (Edward Arnold), who plans to use it.

The film is based on the Broadway play of the same name by Laurence Gross and Edward Childs Carpenter, which played for 265 performances in 1932-33. Edward Arnold played the same role in the Broadway stage production.

In 1941, the film was remade starring Red Skelton and Ann Rutherford. Skelton then played the role of "Wallace Porter" in two sequels.

== Plot ==
Otto Barfuss refuses to pay for protection and won't bow down to the syndicate. When they come for him, he puts the sting on them. Jake Dillon thinks its time to end Barfuss for good, but he knows it has to be done properly so that they don't get caught.

Wallace Porter and his girl Toby Van Buren are eloping when their car breaks down near Dillon's house. He's a mystery writer who brags about his abilities to write the perfect murder. He is forced to give Dillon the perfect way to kill Barfuss while he and Toby are held as prisoners.

Porter manages to connect the radio to contact the phone operator. He and Toby get a message out to save Barfuss. Dillon comes back and is caught by the police.

== Cast ==
- Ernest Truex as Wallace Porter
- Una Merkel as Toby Van Buren
- Edward Arnold as Jake Dillon
- John Miljan as Charlie Shaw
- C. Henry Gordon as Ricco Lombardo
- Johnny Hines as Slim Scanlon
- Joseph Cawthorn as Otto Barfuss
- Nat Pendleton as Joe Salvatore
- Tenen Holtz as Herman Lefkowitz

== Production ==
Bernie Hyman offered the film to Elliott Nugent to write and direct at $1,000 a week. Nugent said the film "got me off the ground as a director."

== See also ==
- List of American films of 1933
