= C. Yarnall Abbott =

American photographer and painter

- Born: Charles Yarnall Abbott; September 23, 1870; Philadelphia, Pennsylvania, U.S.
- Died: June 24, 1938 (aged 67); Philadelphia, Pennsylvania, U.S.
- Education: University of Pennsylvania Law School; Pennsylvania Academy of Fine Arts; Académie Colarossi
- Known for: Photography, painting
- Spouse: Elenore Abbott (m. 1898; died 1938)

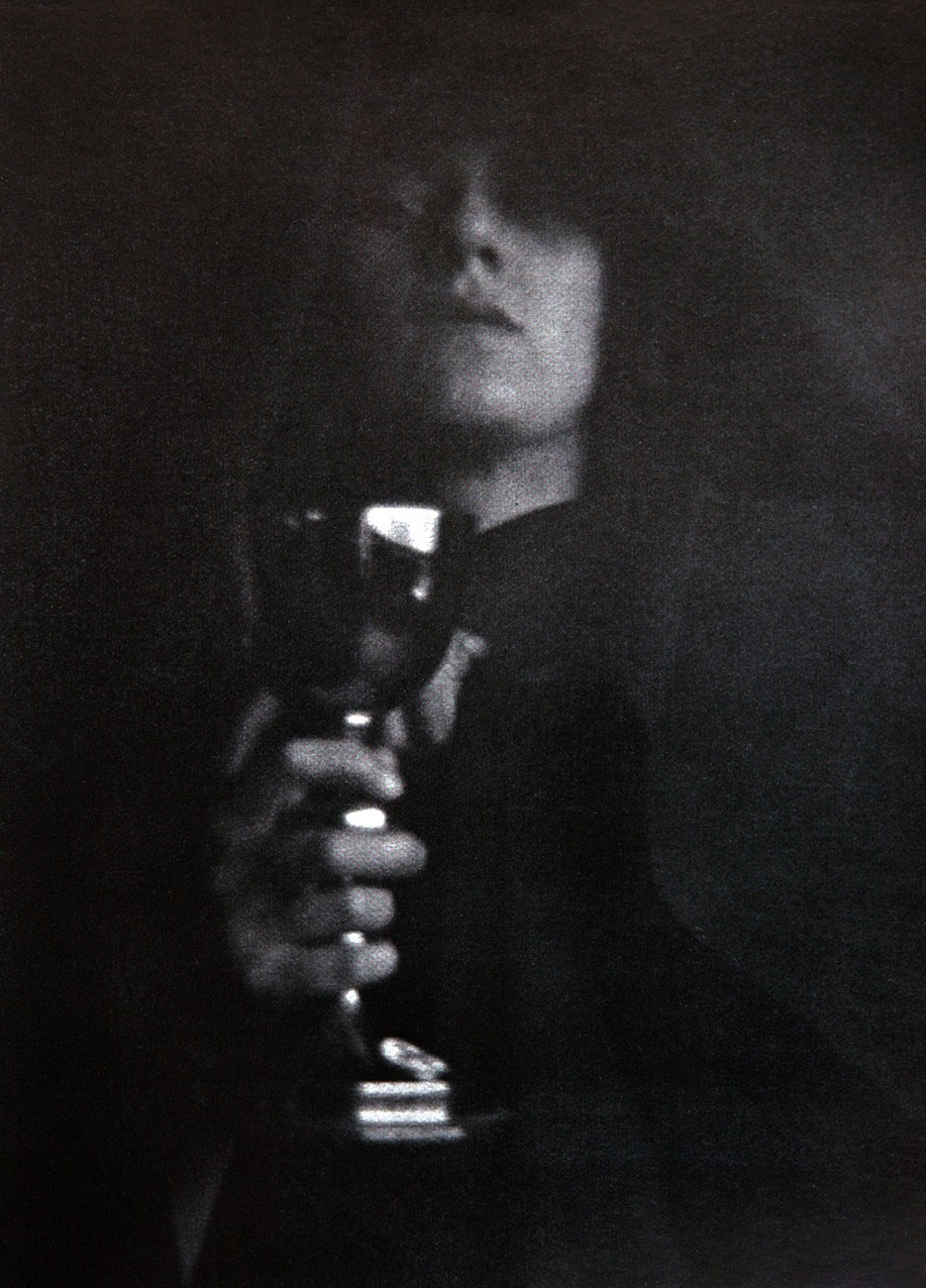
The Darker Drink by C. Yarnall Abbott, 1908

Charles Yarnall Abbott (September 23, 1870 – June 24, 1938) was an American photographer and painter.

== Early life ==
Charles Yarnall Abbott was born on September 23, 1870, in Philadelphia, to Sarah (Yarnall) and William Holloway Abbott, an attorney. He grew up in Philadelphia. He originally went to college to study law. He graduated from the University of Pennsylvania Law School in 1892. He was a lawyer for ten years before becoming an artist.

== Mid-life and career ==
Abbott became interested in the arts while working as a lawyer. First, he gained interest in photography, followed by an interest for painting. He quit working in law and went to study painting. He studied at the Pennsylvania Academy of Fine Arts, training under Thomas Anshutz. He relocated to Paris, France. He studied at the Académie Colarossi. There, he trained under Raphael Collin and Gustave Courtois. He returned from Paris and moved to Rose Valley, Pennsylvania. He married Elenore Abbott in 1898. Abbott fathered one child with Elenore, Marjorie (1907-?).

Some of Abbott's pictures appeared in Camera Work.

The couple relocated to Philadelphia in 1913. Abbott also worked in Rockport, Massachusetts. He co-founded the Rockport Art Association. Starting in 1916, his work was featured in the Pennsylvania Academy of Fine Arts Annual Exhibition, until he died.

== Later life and legacy ==
He served as president of the Philadelphia Sketch Club and the Philadelphia Art Alliance. His work was exhibited at the Art Institute of Chicago and Corcoran Gallery. He lectured and wrote about art appreciation. His work was published in Encyclopædia Britannica. Abbott also was a playwright. He died in 1938. His work is held in the collections of the National Media Museum, the Art Gallery of New South Wales and the National Gallery of Canada.

Abbott died on June 24, 1938, in Philadelphia.
