= Elenore Abbott =

American illustrator and painter

- Born: Elenore Plaisted; 1875 (Note: Abbott's year of birth is generally stated as 1875 Primary passport and ship registers generally show her date of birth as October 18, 1875, but there are two cases where the date of birth is October 18, 1876. Census records sometimes show her year of birth as 1876, which is an estimate calculation based upon age at the date of the census, rather than an exact calculation based upon her date of birth. A family member believes that her year of birth is 1876, without noting a published source.); Lincoln, Maine, U.S.
- Died: 1935 (aged 59–60)
- Education: Philadelphia School of Design for Women; Pennsylvania Academy of the Fine Arts; Drexel Institute; Académie des Beaux-Arts
- Known for: Illustration, scenic design, painting
- Spouse: C. Yarnall Abbott (m. 1898)

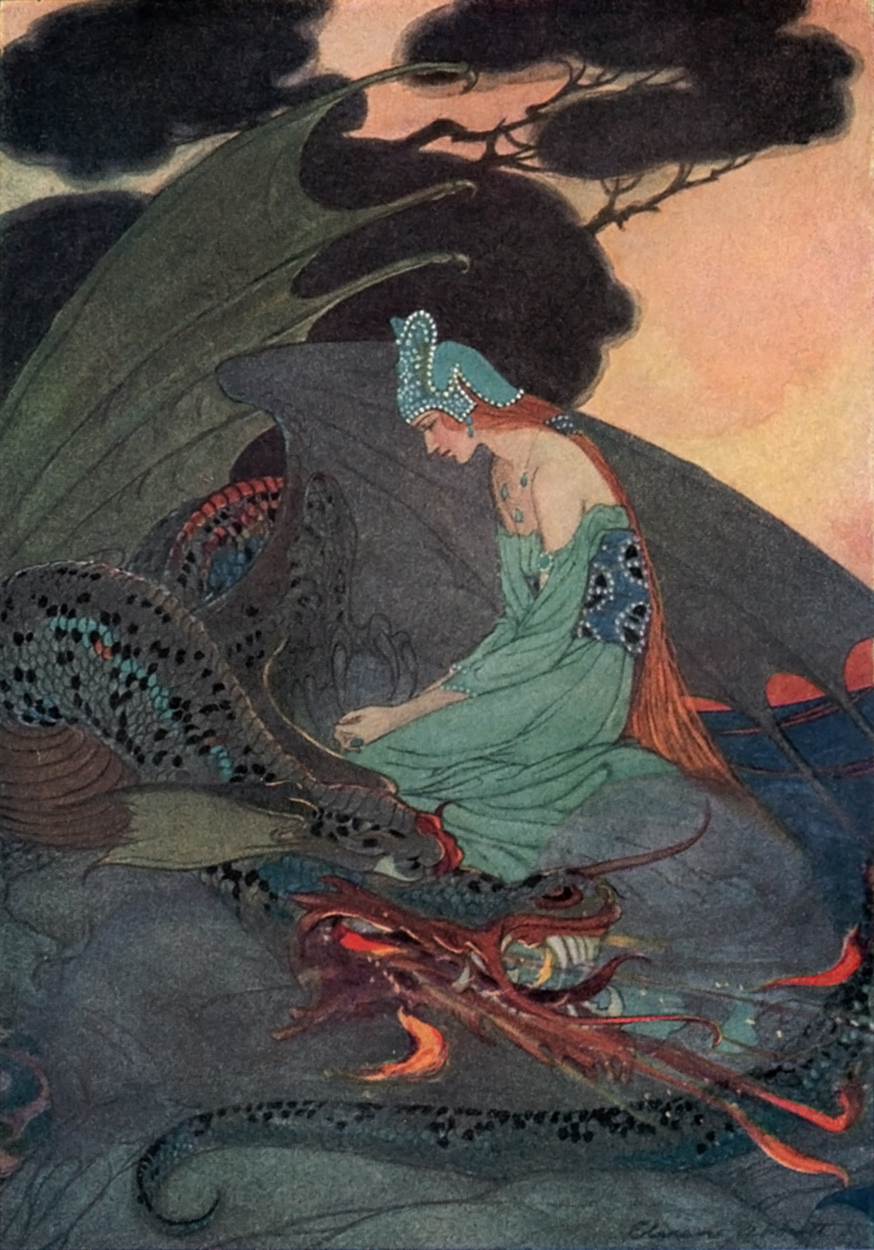
The Two Brothers

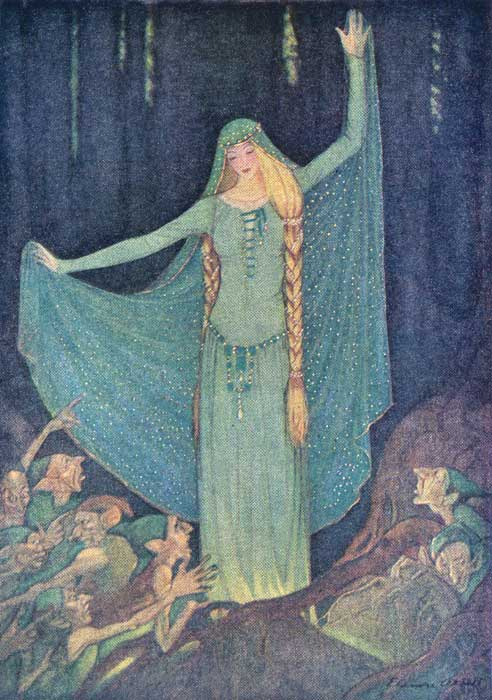
"Earthmen, Come Up" for The Two Kings' Children in Grimms' Fairy Tales, 1920

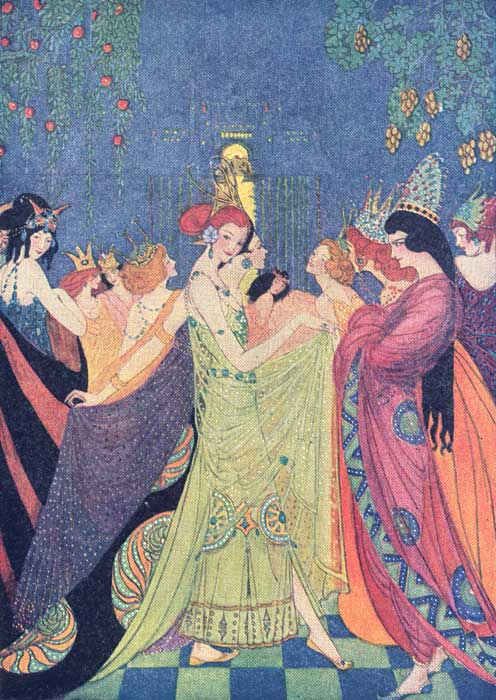
The Shoes that Were Danced to Pieces for Grimm's Fairy Tales, 1920

Elenore Plaisted Abbott (1875–1935) was an American book illustrator, scenic designer, and painter. She illustrated early 20th-century editions of Grimm's Fairy Tales, Robinson Crusoe, and Kidnapped. Several books were published as illustrated by Elenore Plaisted Abbott and Helen Alden Knipe (later Carpenter).

Abbott was educated at three art schools in Philadelphia and Paris and influenced by Howard Pyle. She was among a group of New Women who sought educational and professional opportunities for women, including creating professional art associations like The Plastic Club to promote their work. She was married to fellow artist and lawyer C. Yarnall Abbott.

== Early life and education ==
Elenore Plaisted was born in Lincoln, Maine. She studied art at the Philadelphia School of Design for Women, Pennsylvania Academy of Fine Arts, and in Paris, France at the Académie des Beaux-Arts, where her work was exhibited. Abbott moved back to Philadelphia in 1899. She was influenced significantly by Howard Pyle, her instructor at the Drexel Institute. She said later in her life that she created her favorite pieces under his tutelage.

== Career ==
Abbott, known for her book illustrations, was also a landscape and portrait painter and scenic designer, including work for Hedgerow Theatre's production of The Emperor Jones. She produced illustrations for Harper's Magazine, the Saturday Evening Post, and Scribner's magazines. Abbott created illustrations for books, such as Robert Louis Stevenson's Treasure Island and Kidnapped, Johann David Wyss's Swiss Family Robinson, Louisa May Alcott's Old Fashioned Girl, and the Grimm's Fairy Tales.

Elenore Abbott loves her fairy tales, and no child who receives such a book will be disappointed... Elenore Abbott is not on the surface a clever artist; her active, vigorous yet idealist's mind is brought into subjection and guides the long sensitive fingers that hold the water color brush.

— Evan Nagel Wolf, 1919

Abbott was a member of the Philadelphia Water Color Club and Philadelphia's The Plastic Club, an organization established by women artists to promote "Art for art's sake". Its members included Jessie Wilcox Smith, Violet Oakley, and Elizabeth Shippen Green. These women were identified as the New Woman. As educational opportunities were made more available in the 19th century, women artists became part of professional enterprises, including founding their own art associations. Artwork made by women was considered to be inferior, and to help overcome that stereotype women became "increasingly vocal and confident" in promoting women's work, and thus became part of the emerging image of the educated, modern and freer "New Woman". Artists "played crucial roles in representing the New Woman, both by drawing images of the icon and exemplifying this emerging type through their own lives." In the late 19th-century and early 20th century about 88% of the subscribers of 11,000 magazines and periodicals were women. As women entered the artist community, publishers hired women to create illustrations that depict the world through a woman's perspective. Other successful illustrators were Jennie Augusta Brownscombe and Rose O'Neill.

== Personal life ==
Elenore married lawyer and artist C. Yarnall Abbott in 1898 and the couple lived in Rose Valley, Pennsylvania after 1911. Her husband designed the family house with a studio for Elenore and himself. Their daughter Marjorie, named after Elenore's maternal aunt, was born in 1907. When her aunt died, the Abbotts took in her daughters, Sonya and Elenore.

Elenore Abbot co-founded the Rose Valley swimming pool, in 1928, which was housed on land donated by the Abbotts and financed by the sale of some of Elenore's paintings.

== Works ==
=== Illustrations ===
- Louisa May Alcott, Illustrations by Elenore Plaisted Abbott (1926). An Old-Fashioned Girl. Boston: Little, Brown and Company. OCLC 105983.
- Hans Christian Andersen, Illustrations by Eleanore Abbott (1922). Flower Maiden and Other Stories. Edward Shenton.
- Anna Maynard Barbour, Illustrations by Eleanore Abbott (1901). That Mainwaring Affair. Philadelphia, London: J.B. Lippincott Company. OCLC 10756052.
- Jay Cady, Illustrations by Eleanore Abbott (1912). The Stake: A Story of the New England Coast. Philadelphia: G.W. Jacobs & Company. OCLC 11337900.
- Dwight Burroughs, Illustrations by Helen Alden Knipe and Elenore Plaisted Abbott (1907). Jack, the Giant Killer, Jr. George W. Jacobs.
- Edward Childs Carpenter, Illustrations by Eleanore Abbott (1906). Captain Courtesy: A Tale of Southern California. Philadelphia: G.W. Jacobs.
- Edward Childs Carpenter, Illustrations by Eleanore Abbott (1907). The Code of Victor Jallot: A Romance of Old New Orleans. Philadelphia: G.W. Jacobs.
- Daniel Defoe, Illustrations by Eleanore Abbott (1919). Robinson Crusoe. London.
- Ellen Anderson Gholson Glasgow, Illustrations by Eleanore Abbott (1923). The shadowy third, and other stories. Garden City, New York: Doubleday, Page and Company.
- Jacob Grimm, Illustrations by Eleanore Abbott (1920). Grimm's Fairy Tales. New York: C. Scribner's Sons.
- Nathaniel Hawthorne, Illustrations by Eleanore Abbott (1911). A Wonder Book and Tanglewood Tales. Philadelphia: G.W. Jacobs & Company.
- Elbridge H. Sabin, Illustrations by Helen Alden Knipe and Elenore Plaisted Abbott (1910). The Magical Man of Mirth. George N. Jacobs.
- Robert Louis Stevenson, Illustrations by Eleanore Abbott (1915). Kidnapped. Philadelphia: G.W. Jacobs & Company. OCLC 333026.
- Robert Louis Stevenson, Illustrations by Eleanore Abbott (1911). Treasure Island. Philadelphia: G.W. Jacobs & Company. OCLC 7602448.

=== Watercolor paintings ===
She made the following watercolor paintings by 1916, when they were exhibited at the Philadelphia Water Color Exhibition:

- Endymion and the Nereids
- The Fairy Tale
- Kerfol
- Lamia
- Madrigal
- The Mother
- Oh, to Line in the Grass with Pan!
- Water

== Collections ==
- Brandywine River Museum, Chadds Ford, Pennsylvania (Note: The Smithsonian also has in its inventory for Brandywine River Museum a painting entitled Peggy Abbott Harvey and Daughter Bret (portrait), 1930, oil on canvas with the source being Catalog of American Portraits, National Portrait Gallery, Index. of Paintings, 1982 and "Brandywine River Museum: Catalogue of the Collection, 1969-1989" Chadds Ford, PA: Brandywine Conservancy, 1991, pg. 153. However, Bret[t] was not born until 1936 and Abbott died in 1935. It is believed by the museum's curator, Virginia O'Hare, that this is a painting of another mother and daughter made circa 1930.)
  - I Was Despairing When the Bird Returned, c. 1914, watercolor on illustration board for Swiss Family Robinson
  - On a Rude Throne Sat the Mother, c. 1914, watercolor on illustration board for Swiss Family Robinson
  - The Cluster of Grapes Were Ripe and Rich, c. 1914, watercolor on illustration board for Robinson Crusoe
  - The Monkey Resumed His Place, c. 1914, watercolor on illustration board for Swiss Family Robinson
  - Louise Porter (portrait), c. 1932, oil on canvas
  - Presently I Found I Was Holding to a Spar, c. 1913, watercolor on illustration board for Kidnapped
  - We Retired to Our Airy Castle, c. 1914, watercolor on illustration board for Swiss Family Robinson
- Delaware Art Museum, Wilmington, DE
  - I Was Awakened by the Light of a Hand Lantern Shining in My Face, 1915, gouache on paper for Kidnapped
  - Now and Again I Stumbled, 1911, gouache on paper for Treasure Island
  - One Glance Was Sufficient, 1911, watercolor on paper for Treasure Island
  - Take Me in Straight Or I'll Break Your Arm, 1911, watercolor on paper for Treasure Island
  - When I Waked, It Was Broad Day, 1913, gouache on paper for Robinson Crusoe
- Pennsylvania Academy of the Fine Arts, Philadelphia
  - The Dance, 1896–1897, mural

== Gallery ==
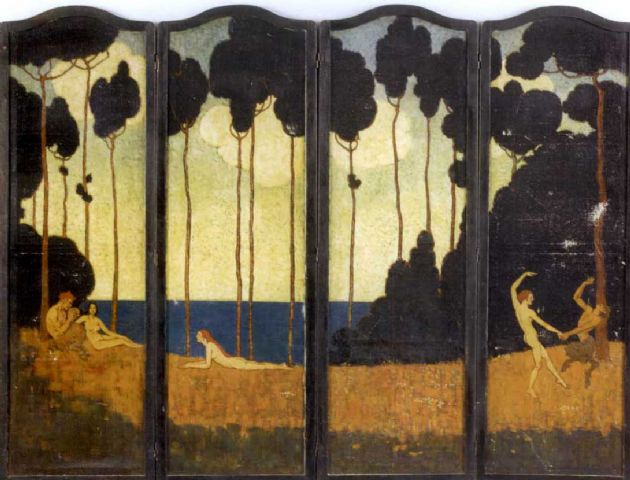
Rose Valley folding screen, 1903 or 1904

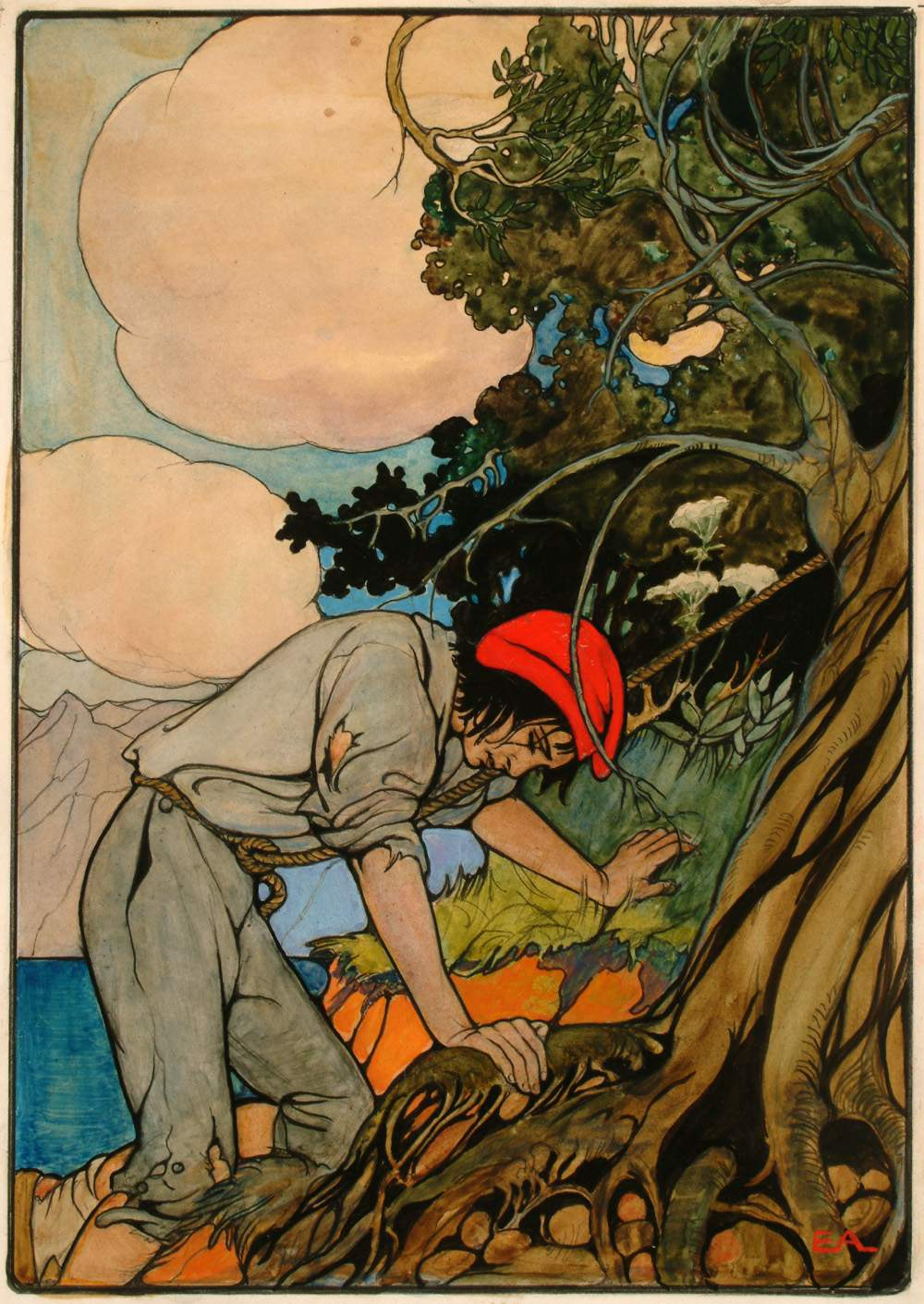
"Now and again I stumbled," for Robert Louis Stevenson's Treasure Island, 1911. Delaware Art Museum.

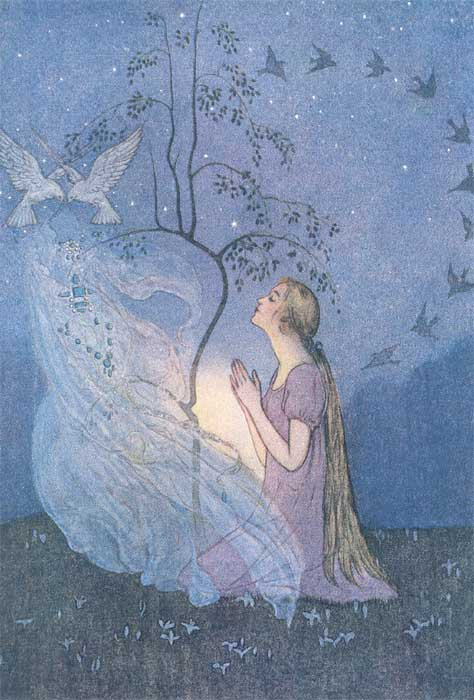
"Rustle and shake yourself, dear tree. And silver and gold throw down to me," for Cinderella, 1920

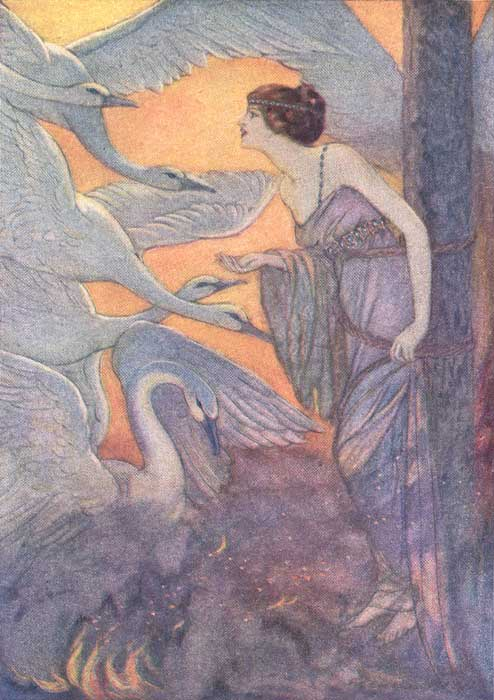
"She looked around, and saw swans come flying through the air", Six Swans for Grimm's Fairy Tales, 1920

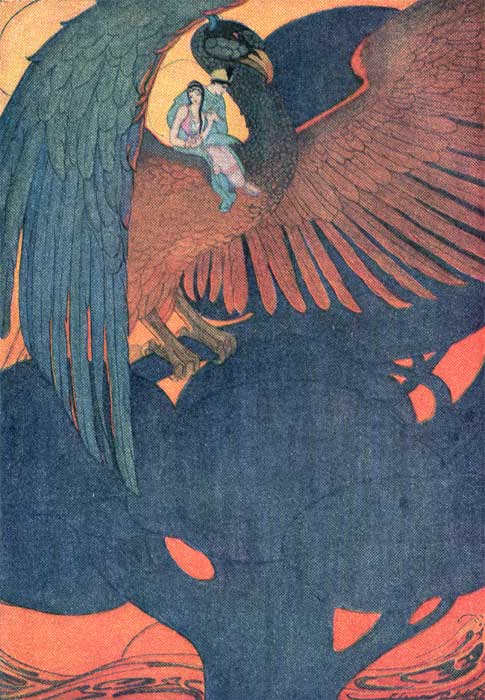
"The griffin carried them over the Red Sea", Soaring Lark for Grimm's Fairy Tales, 1920
