= Hedgerow Theatre =

American repertory theatre company since 1923

Coordinates: 39.8975°N 75.3867°W

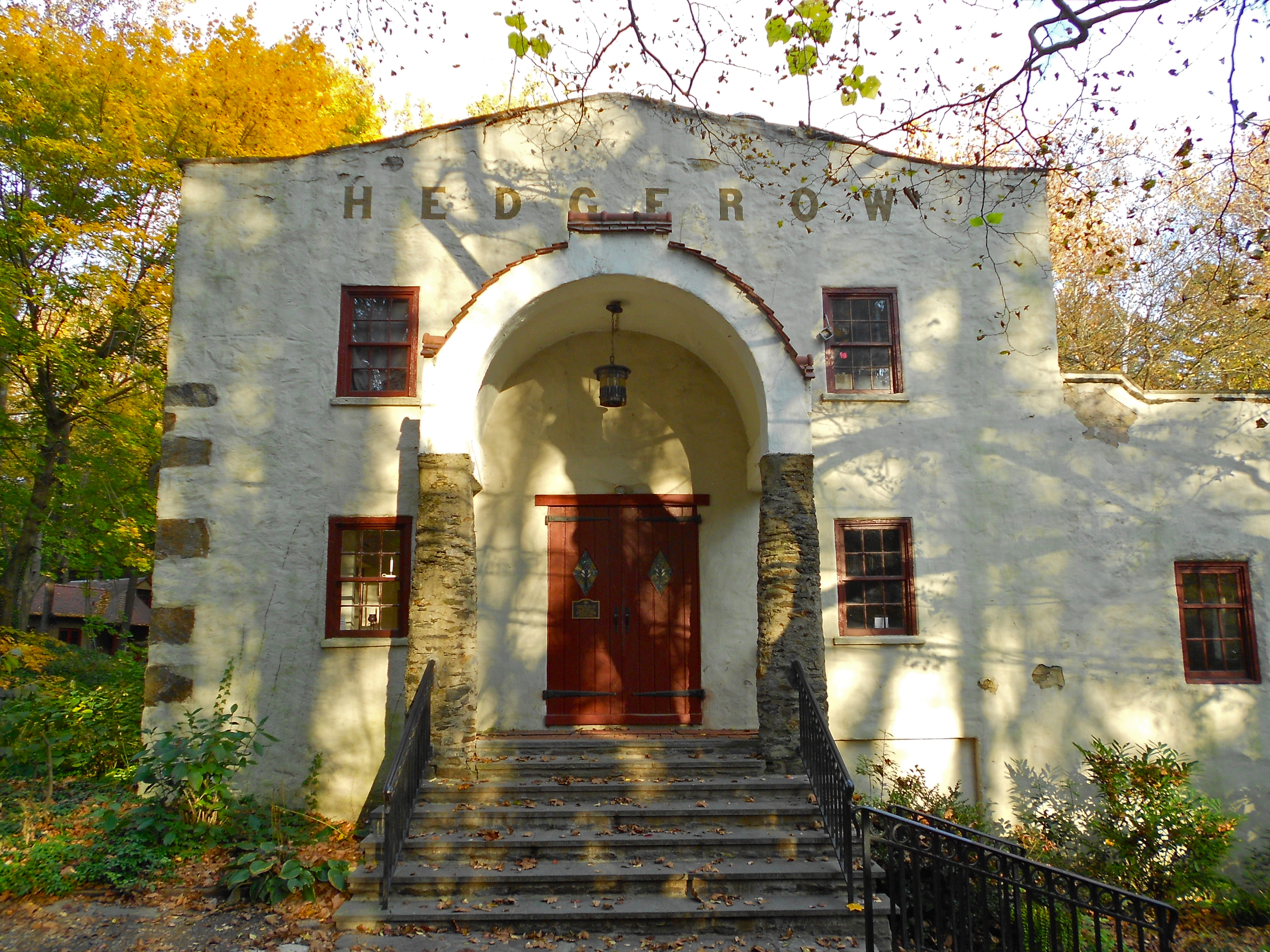
- Hedgerow Theatre on Rose Valley Road
- Type: Private
- Industry: Theatre company
- Founded: 1923 in Rose Valley, Pennsylvania, United States
- Founder: Jasper Deeter
- Headquarters: Rose Valley, Pennsylvania, United States
- Website: https://www.hedgerowtheatre.org

Hedgerow Theatre is a theatre company founded in 1923. It is based in Rose Valley, Pennsylvania, United States near Philadelphia. It was "for many years the only true U. S. professional repertory theater." The building is a contributing structure in the Rose Valley Historic District listed on the National Register of Historic Places.

== History ==
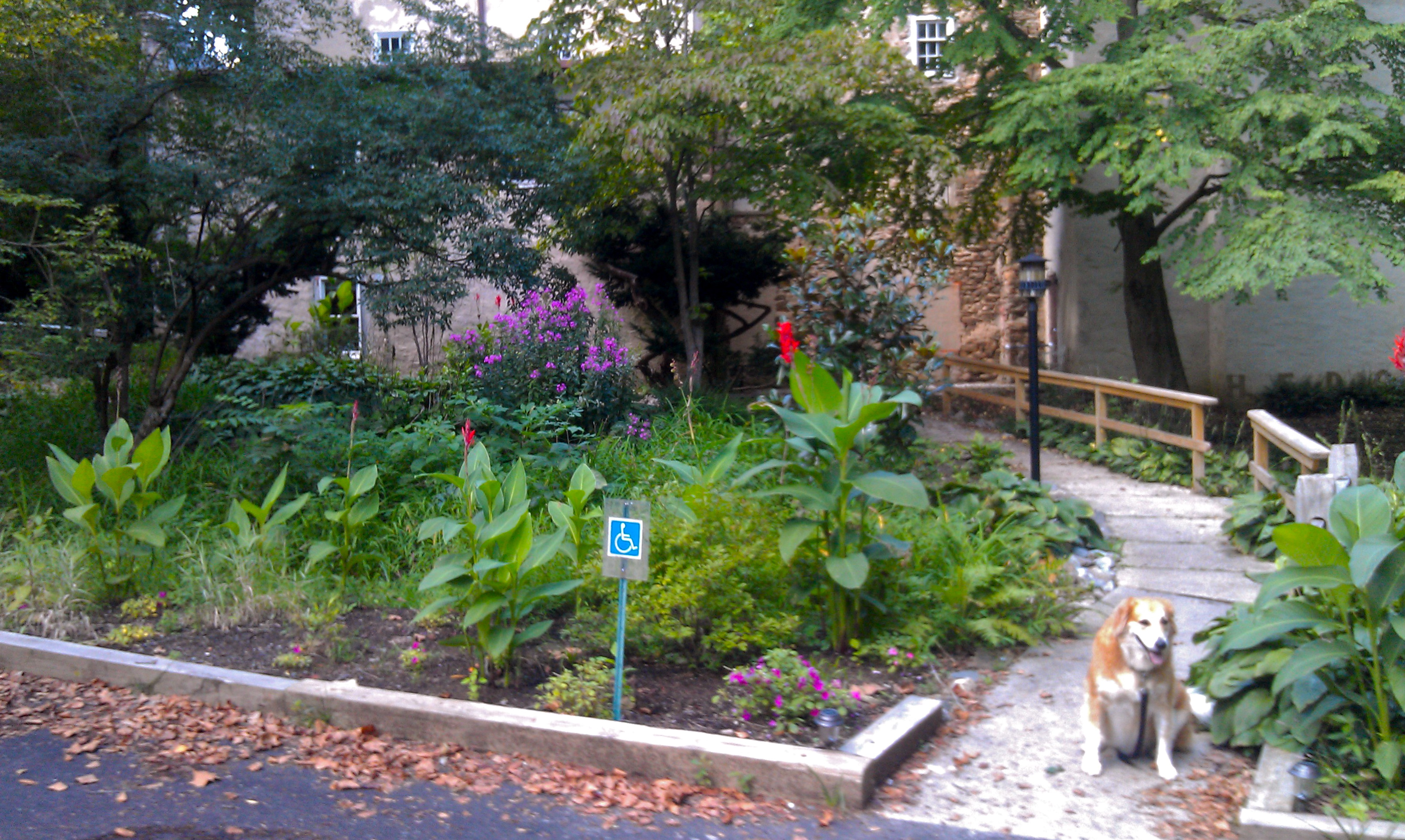
Garden next to the theater.

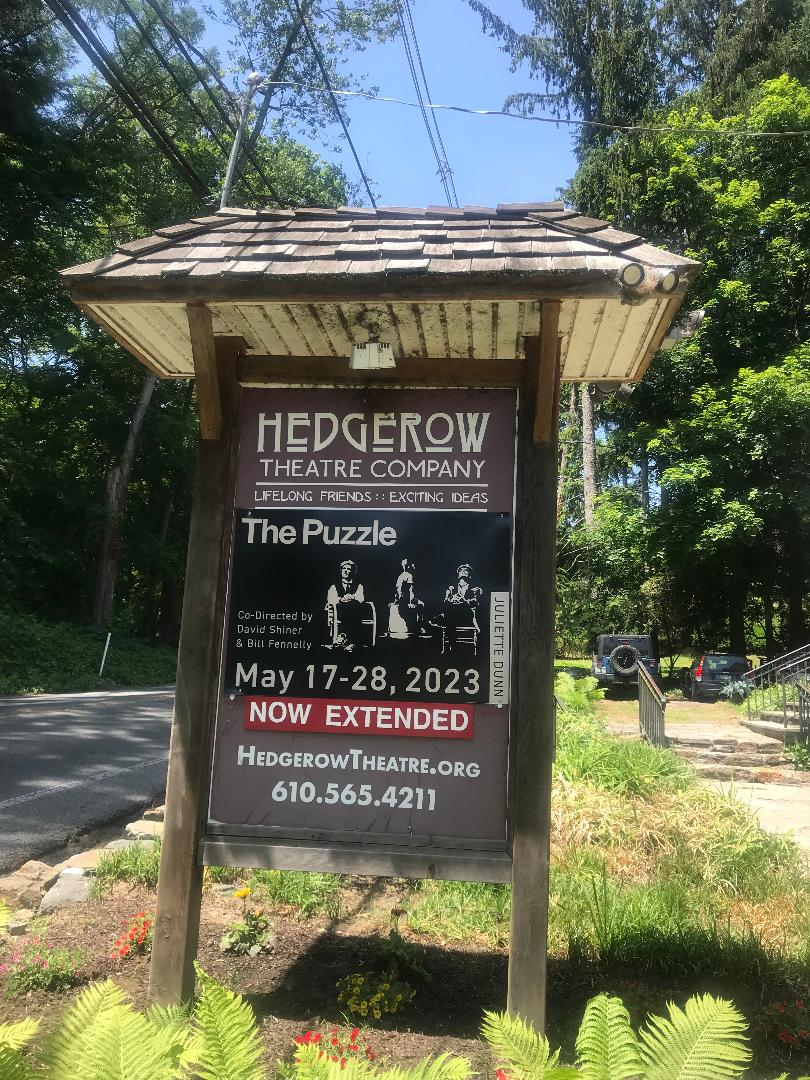
A sign near the theater about the theater company.

Hedgerow was founded in 1923 by New York-based director and actor Jasper Deeter in Rose Valley, less than 3 miles from Media and Swarthmore. The theatre building, originally a gristmill built in 1840, seats 108 spectators after an early twentieth-century reconstruction designed by architect William Lightfoot Price. Other sources note, however, that the Theatre building was "erected in 1807 as a snuff mill and later rebuilt as a hand-weaving mill." It is a contributing structure in the Rose Valley Historic District. Hedgerow's green room once showcased a staircase and table designed by Wharton Esherick, an acclaimed American craftsman. Located a half mile from the theatre is Hedgerow House, once used as housing for the residential company members as well as a rehearsal space, school, and office, accompanied by the costume and prop shops.

The Pennsylvania Guide, compiled by the Writers' Program of the Works Progress Administration in 1940, described the founding of the Theatre by Deeter and its early operations:

When at Swarthmore with a company of actors from the Provincetown Playhouse in the spring of 1923, Jasper Deeter, former Harrisburg newspaperman, took a stroll along Possum Hollow Road and came upon an old mill ... Brushing past the cobwebs, Deeter walked inside to rest; some years earlier the mill had been used for amateur theatricals, and Deeter saw its possibilities. He severed relations with the Provincetown company, and with a troupe of six actors launched Hedgerow as a permanent repertory theater, its first production being George Bernard Shaw's Candida. Local people constituted most of the cast and provided scenery, props, and lights. Today Hedgerow presents a well-rounded repertoire of significant plays, both tragedy and comedy. For one week in the latter part of July each year the theater stages a George Bernard Shaw Festival. In aiding Deeter with his advice and granting him special royalty arrangements, Shaw once said: 'I am interested in repertory theatres. That's where the whole thing is kept alive; in theaters such as the Malvern Theatre [in England] and in the Hedgerow Theater in the United States.'

— Federal Writers' Project, "Part III: Tours", Pennsylvania: A Guide to the Keystone State (1940)

In 1931, Ann Harding purchased the Hedgerow Theatre building for Deeter for $5,000 and donated it to the company.

Throughout its long history, Hedgerow has helped to spawn other popular theatre companies, most notably People's Light and Theatre Company. Hedgerow has been the site of many play debuts and has received recognition by producing the plays of George Bernard Shaw, Eugene O'Neill, and Seán O'Casey. Its actors have included H. Foley, Richard Basehart, Ann Harding, Keanu Reeves, Stephen Lang, and Austin Pendleton.

From 1990 to 2013, Penelope Reed assumed the artistic direction of Hedgerow. Reed's son Jared Reed succeeded his mother as artistic director and in 2021 Marcie Bramucci was hired as executive artistic director.

Their Mainstage season offers diverse plays, including new works, farces and Shakespeare. The company is committed to school tours, outreach programs, and features a Children's Theatre. Hedgerow provides fellowships for recent college graduates, offering practical experience in various theater disciplines. Hedgerow was awarded the Best New Play 2005 Barrymore Award for The Lives of Bosie by John Wolfson featuring Austin Pendleton.
