= Whistling in the Dark (1941 film) =

1941 film by S. Sylvan Simon

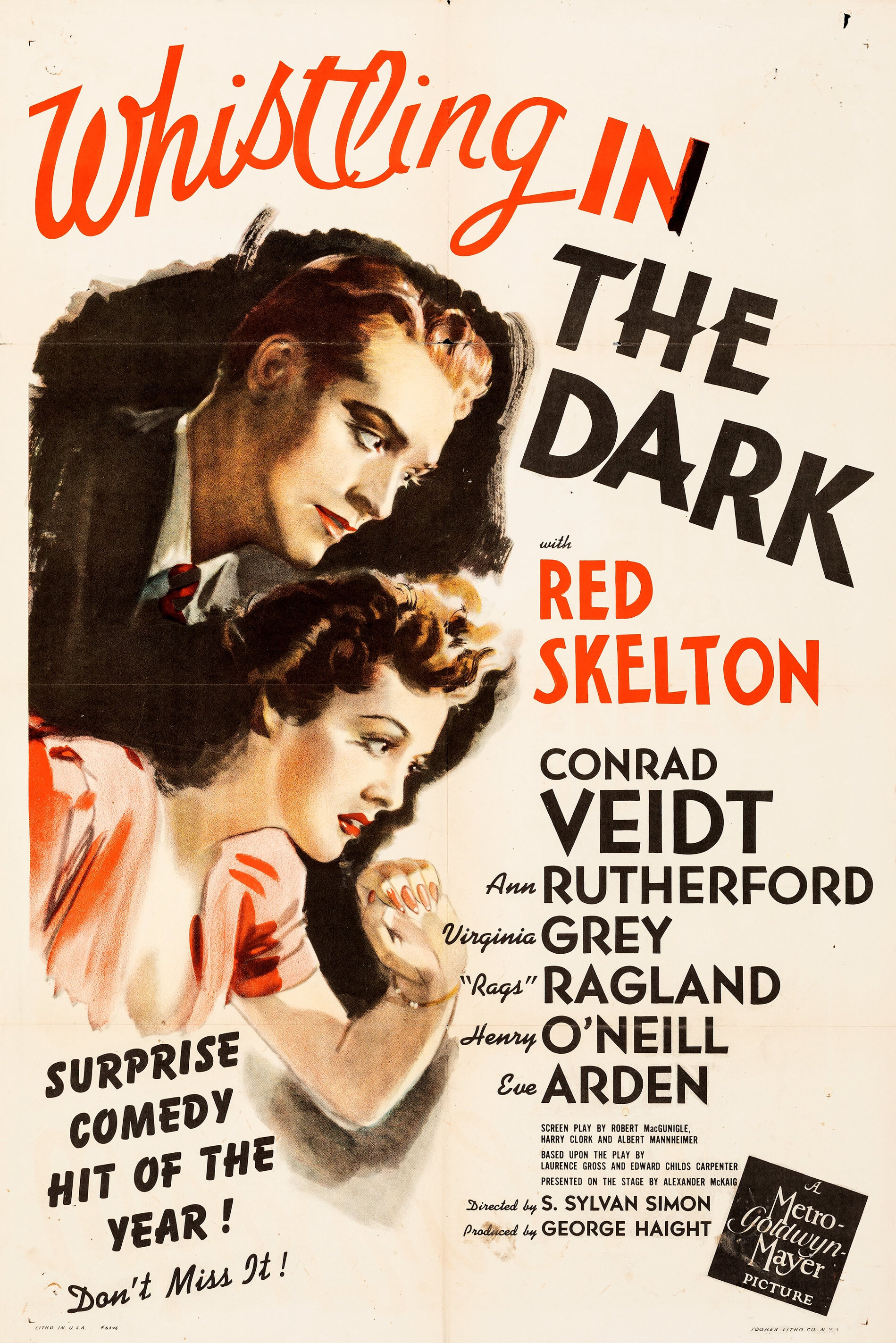
- Directed by: S. Sylvan Simon
- Written by: Robert MacGunigle; Harry Clork; Albert Mannheimmer; Eddie Moran (uncredited); Elliott Nugent (uncredited)
- Based on: Whistling in the Dark; 1932 play by Laurence Gross; Edward Childs Carpenter
- Produced by: George Haight
- Starring: Red Skelton; Conrad Veidt; Ann Rutherford; Virginia Grey
- Cinematography: Sidney Wagner
- Edited by: Frank E. Hull
- Music by: Bronislau Kaper
- Production company: Metro-Goldwyn-Mayer
- Distributed by: Loew's Inc.
- Release date: August 8, 1941
- Running time: 78 minutes
- Country: United States
- Language: English

Whistling in the Dark is a 1941 American comedy film directed by S. Sylvan Simon. It is the first of three films starring Red Skelton as Wally "the Fox" Benton, who writes and acts in radio murder mysteries. Wally is kidnapped by a greedy cult leader (played by Conrad Veidt), who threatens to kill Wally's girlfriend (portrayed in all three films by Ann Rutherford) and another young woman unless he concocts a perfect murder. The film was based on the Broadway play of the same name by Laurence Gross and Edward Childs Carpenter. Uncredited contributing writer Elliott Nugent wrote and directed the earlier film adaptation of the same name.

The two sequels are Whistling in Dixie (1942) and Whistling in Brooklyn (1943).

== Plot ==
Wally Benton (Red Skelton) is the star of a mystery series on radio, The Fox, which he writes himself, inventing for each episode a crime that has "only one loophole" so the criminal can be caught. He is about to elope with Carol Lambert (Ann Rutherford), but his agent (Eve Arden) tells him he must go out with the sponsor's daughter, Fran Post (Virginia Grey), or risk his show being canceled.

Outside the city, at a mansion called Silver Haven, Joseph Jones (Conrad Veidt) runs a cult that promises serenity and contact with the dead, but is really just a scam to collect donations. He learns that a member has died and bequeathed a life interest in $1,000,000 to her nephew Harvey Upshaw (Lloyd Corrigan), with the principal going to Silver Haven on Upshaw's death. Jones, angry that she did not leave the money directly to his cult, determines to have Upshaw killed at once, but he must avoid suspicion. Some of Jones's henchmen are fans of The Fox and admire Benton's plots, so he gets the idea to kidnap Benton and make him invent a real crime with no loopholes. Learning that two different women are expecting to meet Benton that night and one is his fiancée, he has Lambert and Post kidnapped as well.

Benton tries to protect the women, but is out of his depth. After a bumbling escape attempt through a secret passage fails, he decides he needs to come up with a plot as Jones demands. He has the idea to substitute poison for the tooth powder that Upshaw will undoubtedly take along as he flies overnight to meet his aunt's lawyer. The women are aghast at Benton's cooperation, but when the poison is brought to Benton, he puts it in a packet but then substitutes another harmless one. However, this gets lost and another packet is made up with real poison: Upshaw is in real danger. And so are Benton, Lambert, and Post, as Jones will have no reason to let them live once the plot succeeds.

Benton finds a hidden telephone, but before he can reach the police, he is seen and the phone is ripped from the wires. Jones leaves and Benton is locked in with the women in the same room. He touches the telephone wires together to simulate dialing 0, but cannot talk to the operator without a telephone. But, noticing a radio in the room, he uses his knowledge of radio to improvise a way to use it as a phone: the loudspeaker will double as a microphone if they swap the right wires back and forth each time he starts or finishes talking.

He reaches the telephone operator and tries to get a message sent to Upshaw's flight, but Jones's man on the flight finds a way to disable the aircraft radio, and contact is lost. Benton then has the operator contact his radio station, where it is almost time for The Fox. They patch his phone call through to the transmitter and he begins telling all his listeners what has been happening.

But they have to speak loudly, and the one dim-witted guard who was left outside the door bursts in. They save themselves by convincing him they are just passing the time by pretending to do a radio show. He finds the idea fun and even participates, adding useful information such as the mansion's address. Unfortunately, the local police assume it is fiction, like the recent War of the Worlds broadcast, so the three hostages are not saved until Benton's friends from the radio station arrive with city police.

Meanwhile, on the flight, Upshaw learns of the plot thanks to a small boy who enjoys The Fox and listens to it by an ordinary radio on board. Warned not to brush his teeth, he remarks, "I won't even take them out".

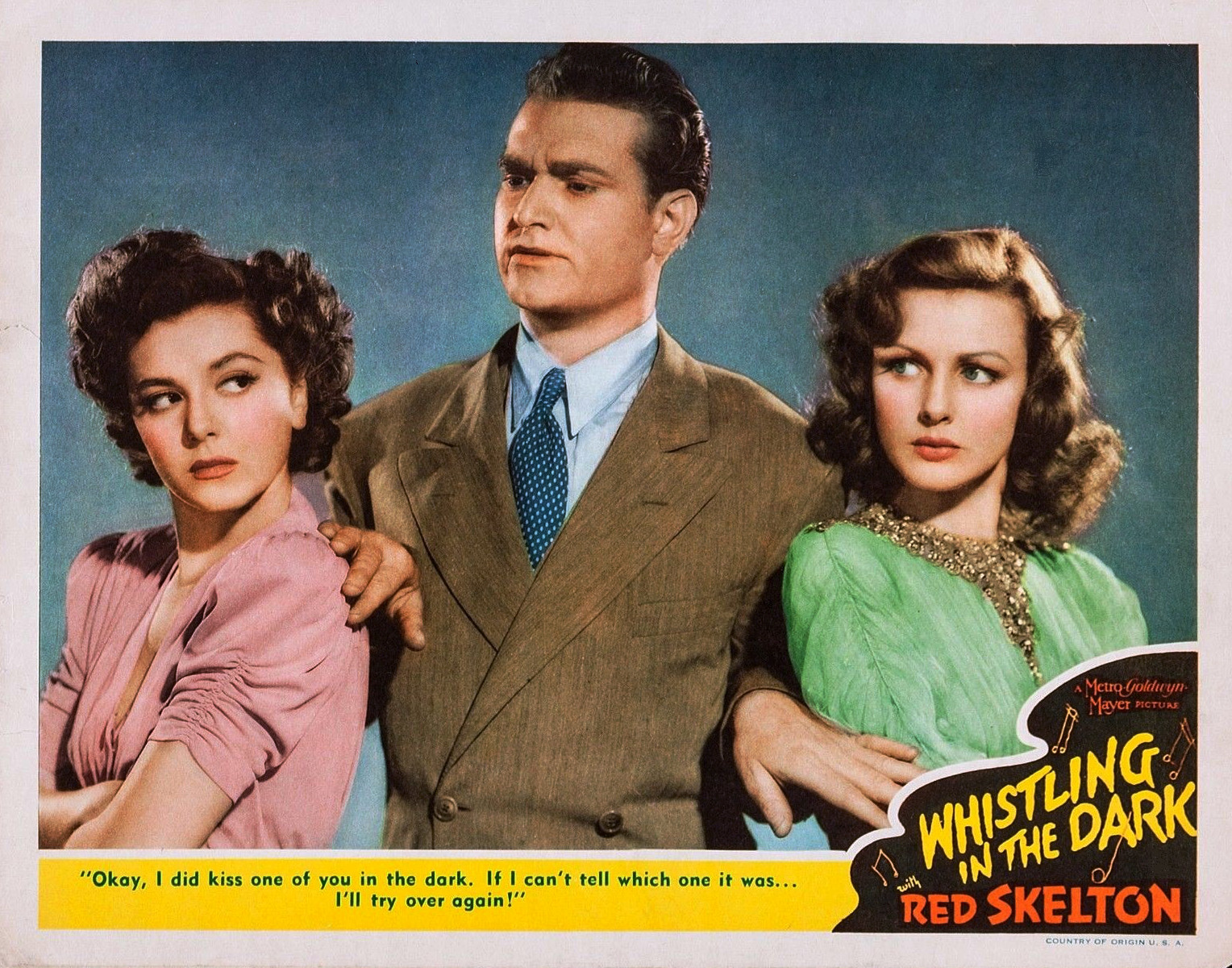
Lobby card

== Cast ==
- Red Skelton as Wally Benton
- Conrad Veidt as Joseph Jones
- Ann Rutherford as Carol Lambert
- Virginia Grey as "Fran" Post
- Rags Ragland as Sylvester (as "Rags" Ragland)
- Henry O'Neill as Philip Post
- Eve Arden as "Buzz" Baker
- Paul Stanton as Jennings
- Don Douglas as Gordon Thomas
- Don Costello as "Noose" Green
- William Tannen as Robert Graves
- Reed Hadley as Beau Smith
- Mariska Aldrich as Hilda
- Lloyd Corrigan as Harvey Upshaw
- George M. Carleton as Deputy Commissioner O'Neill (as George Carleton)
- Will Lee as Herman
- Ruth Robinson as Mrs. Robinson
