= Rose Valley, Pennsylvania =

Borough in Pennsylvania, US

- Borough
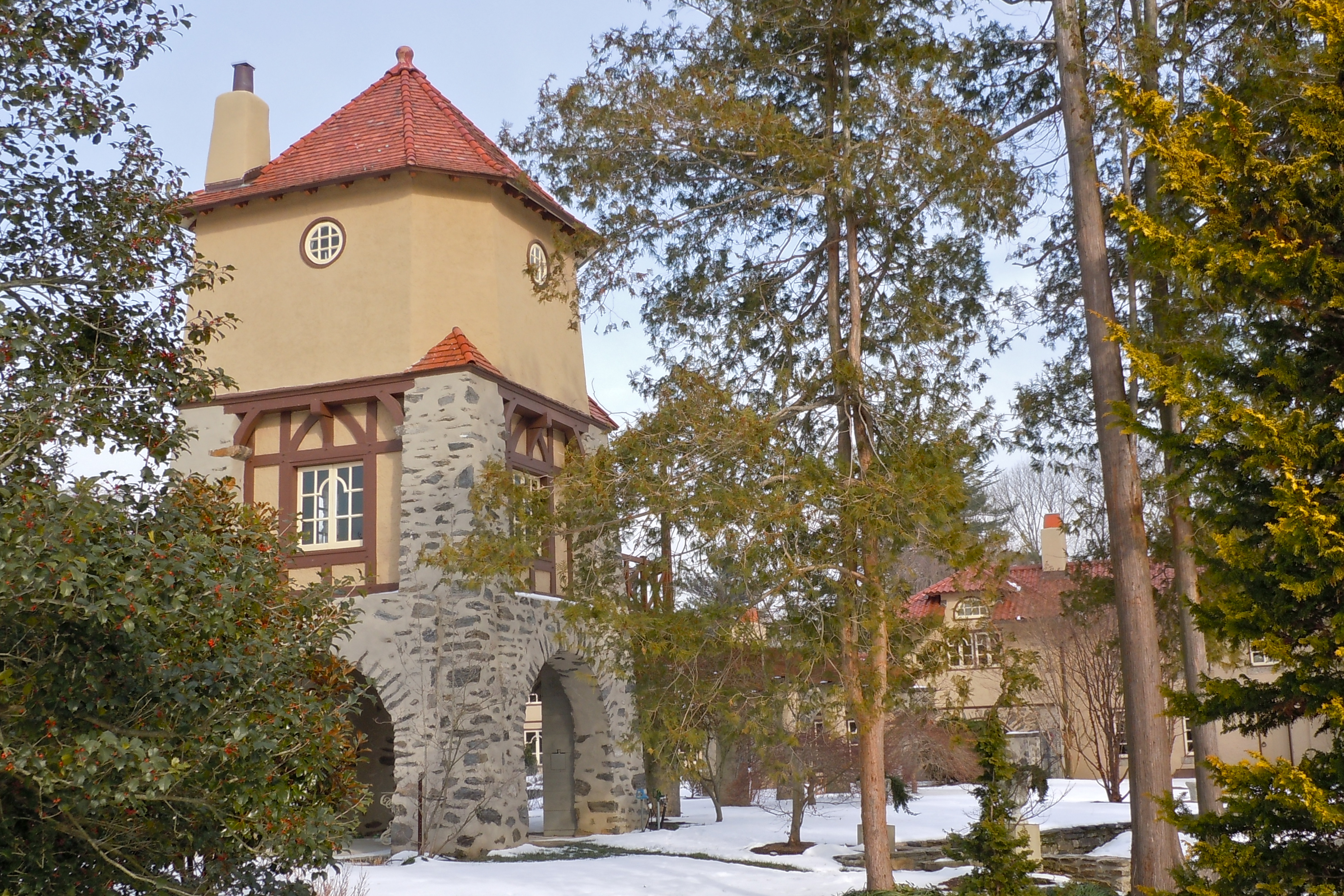
- Water tower at Schoenhaus

- Location in Delaware County and the U.S. state of Pennsylvania.

- Location of Rose Valley in Pennsylvania Rose Valley (the United States)
- Coordinates: 39°53′43″N 75°23′09″W
- Country: United States
- State: Pennsylvania
- County: Delaware

Area
  - Total: 0.73 sq mi (1.90 km^{2})
  - Land: 0.73 sq mi (1.90 km^{2})
  - Water: 0 sq mi (0.00 km^{2})
- Elevation: 180 ft (55 m)

Population (2020)
  - Total: 1,017
  - Density: 1,389.7/sq mi (536.57/km^{2})
- Time zone: UTC-5 (EST)
  - Summer (DST): UTC-4 (EDT)
- ZIP codes: 19063, 19086
- Area code: 610
- FIPS code: 42-045-66192
- FIPS code: 42-66192
- GNIS feature ID: 1185459
- Website: www.rosevalleyborough.org
- Rose Valley Historic District
- U.S. National Register of Historic Places
- U.S. Historic district
- Location: Roughly bounded by Ridley Creek, Woodward Rd, Providence and Brookhaven Rds and Todmorden Ln
- Architect: William Lightfoot Price, others
- Architectural style: Vernacular, Victorian, various
- NRHP reference No.: 10000470
- Added to NRHP: July 19, 2010

Rose Valley is a small, historic borough in Delaware County, Pennsylvania, United States. Its area is 0.73 square miles (1.9 km^{2}), and the population was 1,190 in 2023. The area was settled by Quaker farmers in 1682, and later water mills along Ridley Creek drove manufacturing in the nineteenth century.

In 1901, Rose Valley was founded as an Arts and Crafts community by architect William Lightfoot Price, who bought 80 acres (320,000 m^{2}) of land around the former Rose Valley textile mill. Price was a follower of Henry George's economics (Georgism). Price also co-founded Arden, Delaware, a utopian single tax community based on Henry George's economic model. Nevertheless, the Georgist single-tax ideal was never implemented in Rose Valley. Crafts works soon foundered, leaving a legacy of impressive architecture, a preserved landscape, and a regional theatre, the Hedgerow Theatre (founded in 1923), as well as an artistic community that includes writers, painters, and architects. As a former mayor said, "Rose Valley is an island of non-conformity." The Rose Valley Historic District, covering essentially all of the borough, was listed on the National Register of Historic Places in 2010.

== History ==
Native Americans of the Leni Lenape or Delaware tribe lived in the area when Europeans began arriving. A major trade route, the Great Minquas Path, passed through the site of the present borough, along Long Point, a hairpin turn in Ridley Creek, and then across the creek and through the center of the borough. Furs were carried along the path from Native Americans on the Susquehanna River to European traders on the Schuylkill and Delaware rivers.

Soon after William Penn received his charter for the Colony of Pennsylvania, three brothers, Thomas, Robert, and Randall Vernon, received land grants from Penn to settle over 900 acres (360 ha) in the present borough of Rose Valley and Nether Providence Township. The brothers arrived in Pennsylvania in 1682 and began farming the area, about 4 miles (6 km) north of Chester, which was then the largest settlement in the colony. Though the brothers purchased their land in 1681 while still in London, the land was not surveyed and patents were not granted for the land until years, perhaps decades, later. The Providence Great Road (now PA 252), just to the north of the borough, was laid out in the 1680s, and Brookhaven Road, on the borough's eastern boundary, was laid out in 1705.

Randall Vernon's house was built before 1700, and still stands. Robert Vernon may have built the house known as the "Bishop White House" about 1695. The name of the house comes from its use by the family of Bishop William White during the yellow fever epidemic of 1793 in Philadelphia. Though the bishop visited the house, he generally stayed in Philadelphia in 1793. William Lightfoot Price modified this house after 1900, adding a stone porch and red tile roof. The Vernon families continued living in the area into the nineteenth century. The American Revolution split family members, who served as soldiers on both the American and British sides.

Many veterans of the Revolution are buried in now unmarked graves in the cemetery of the Old Union Methodist Church, the only church in the borough. The roots of the church may go back to 1804, and it was officially organized in 1811. The current building dates to 1835.

Following the Revolution, land in the southwest corner of the present borough was confiscated from a Vernon family member who had supported the British. The land was eventually sold to Jacob Benninghove, a Philadelphia tobacconist, who built a large mansion there in 1787. About the same time, he built a dam on Ridley Creek and a water-powered snuff mill. Samuel Bancroft bought the house in 1831 and named it Todmorden Mansion. He lost the house in bankruptcy in 1842, but bought it back in 1857 and lived there until 1889. He built tunnels and secret chambers in the house for use in the Underground Railroad.

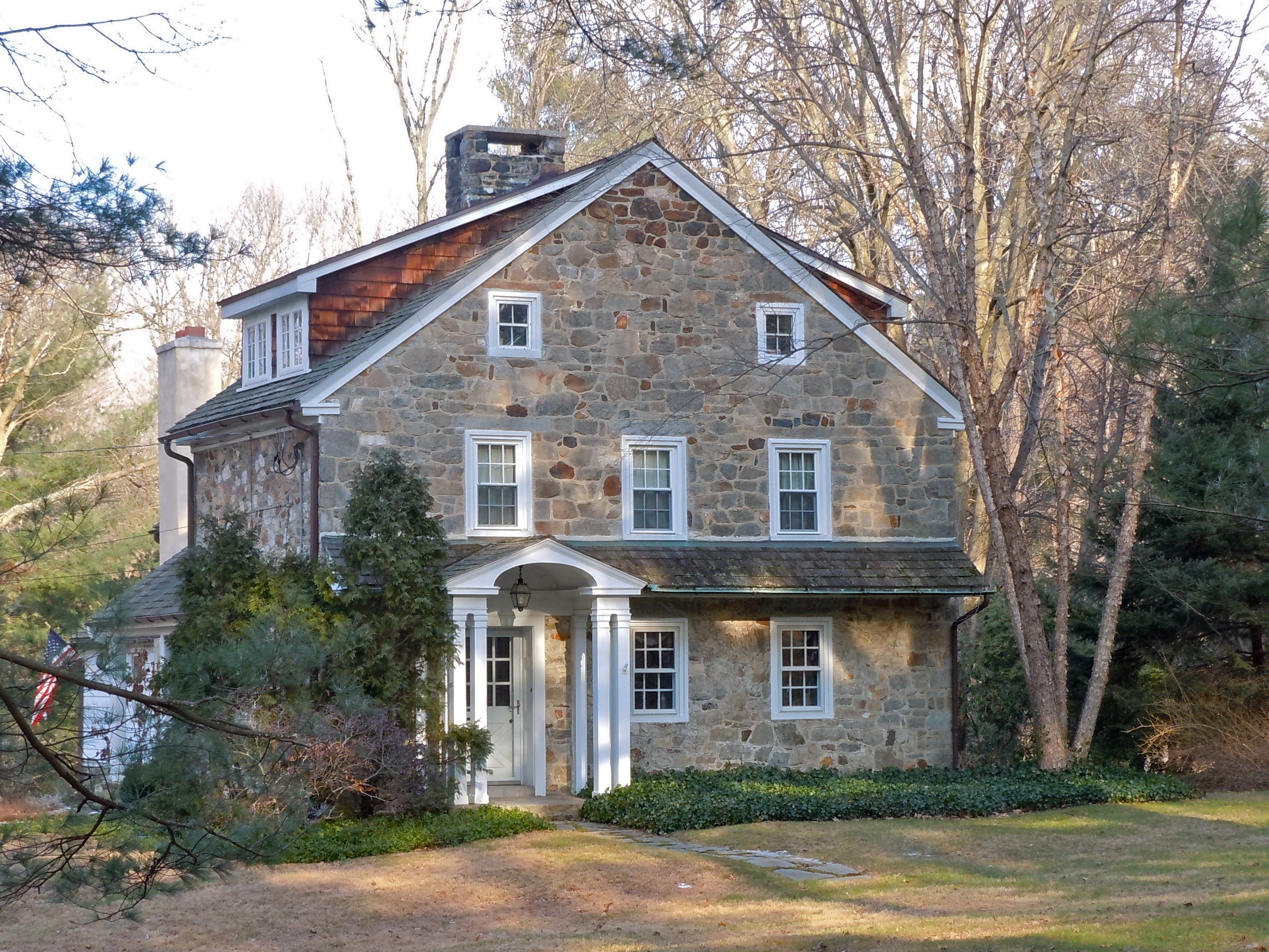
Randall Vernon House, built before 1700

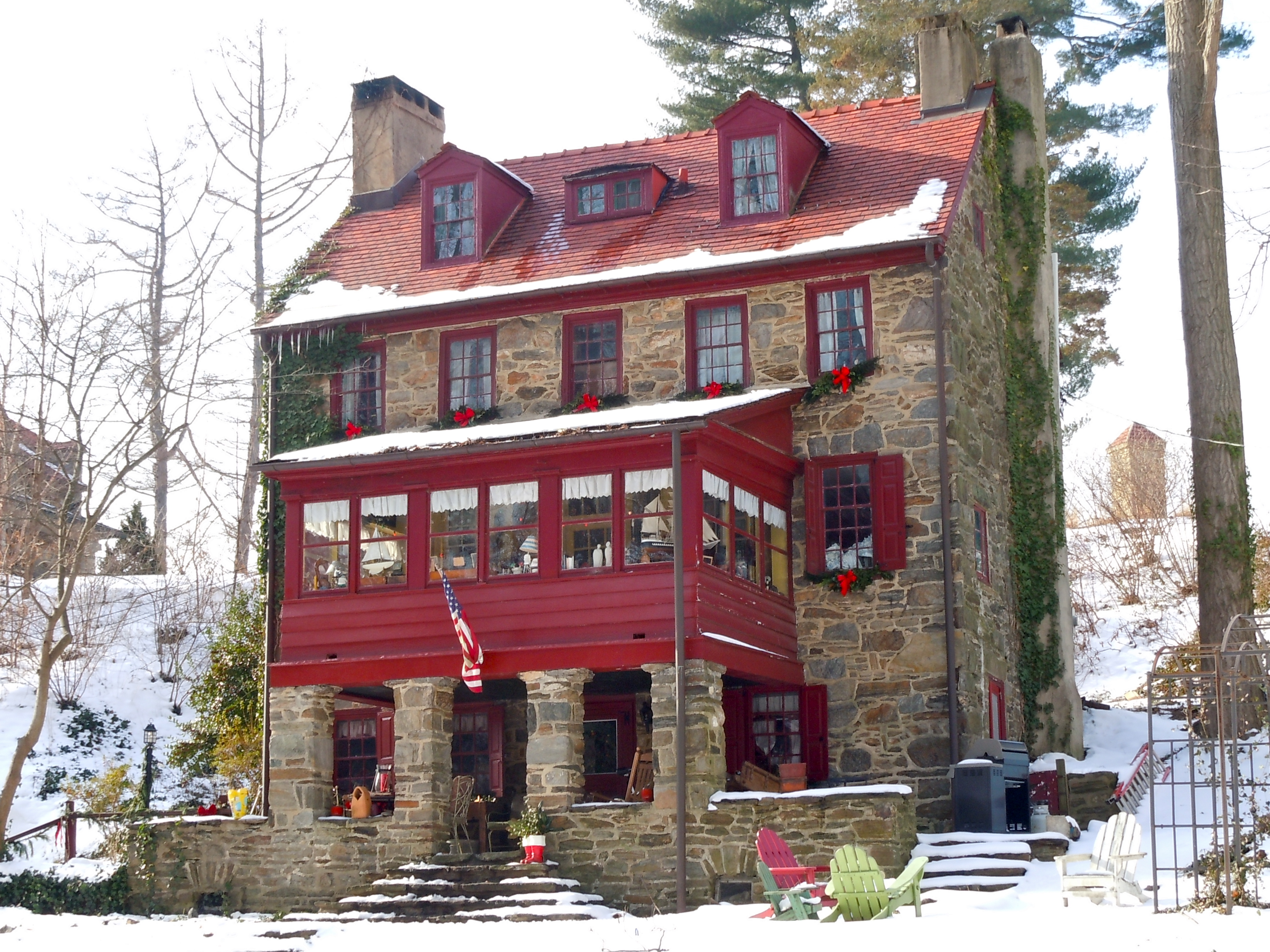
Bishop White House, c. 1695

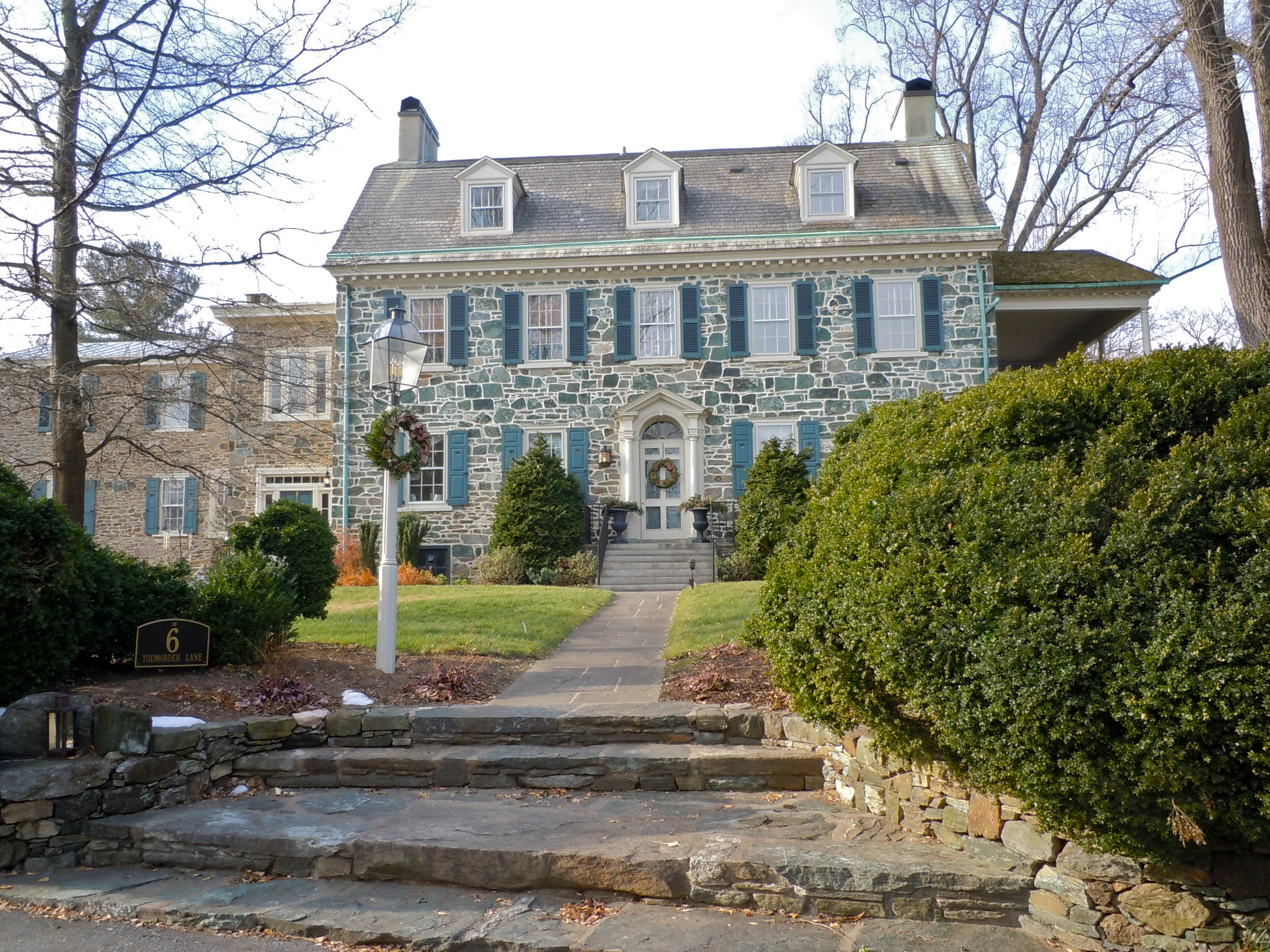
Todmorden Mansion, built 1787 of green serpentine stone

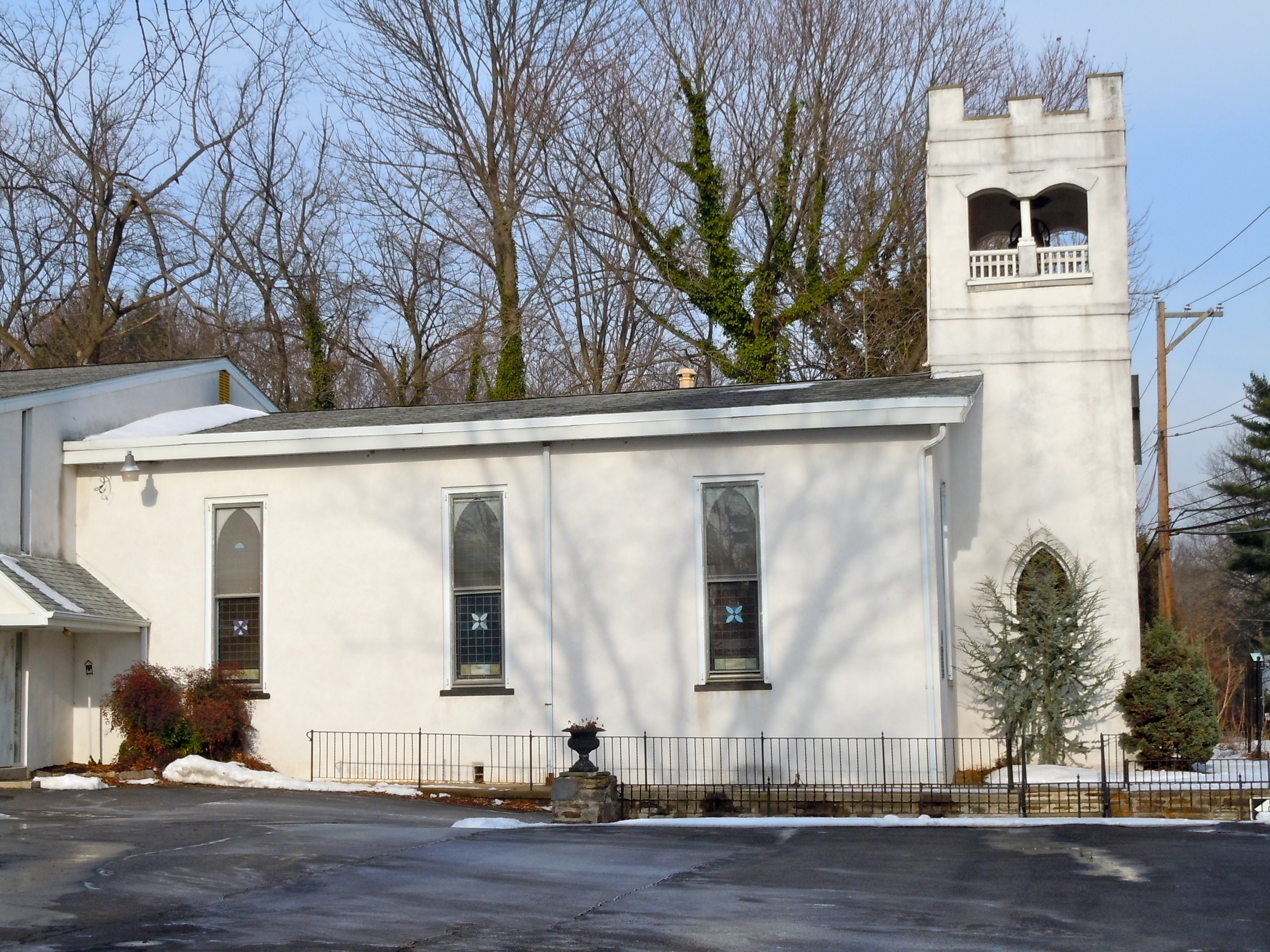
Old Union Methodist Church

== Mills ==
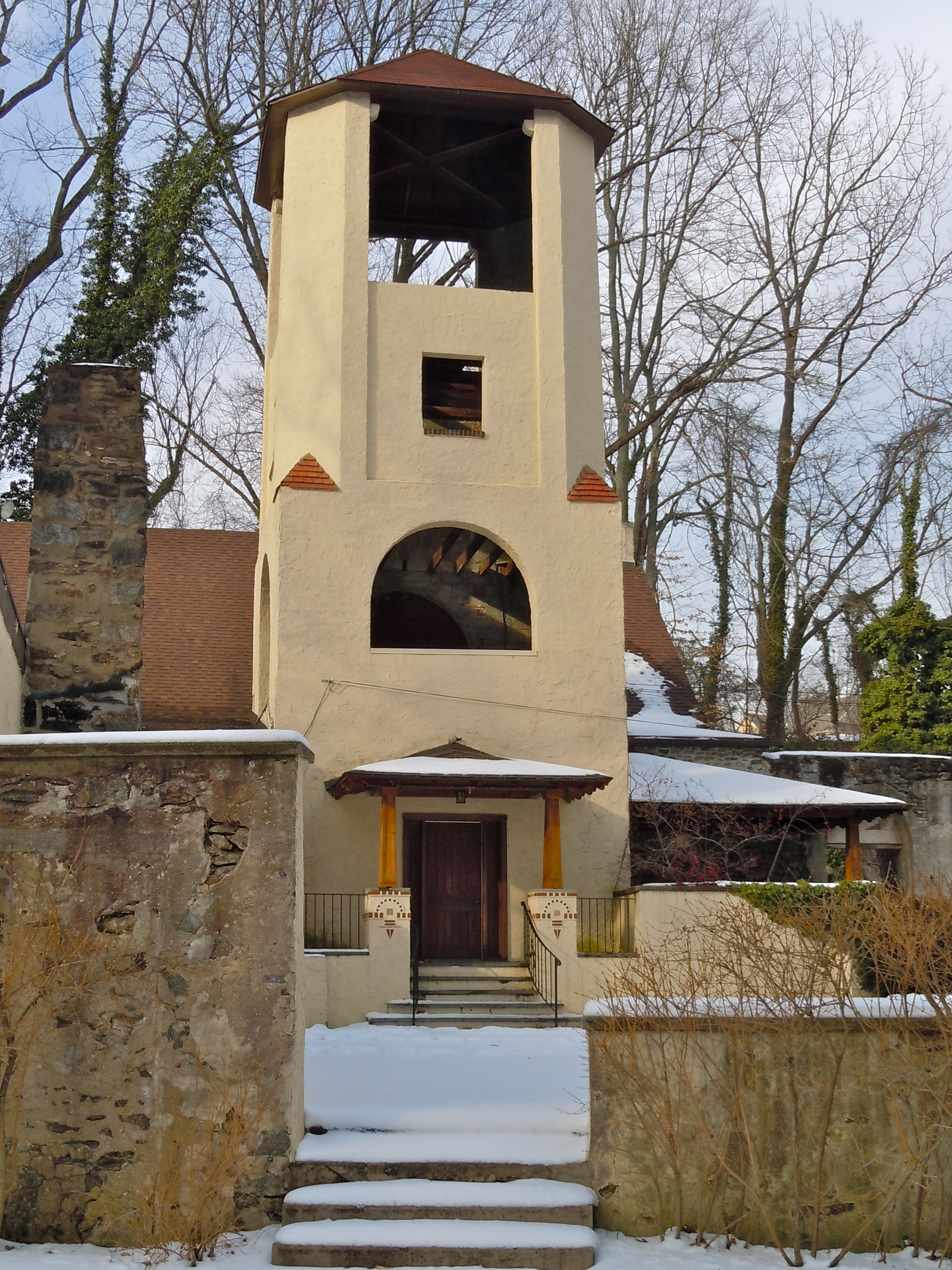
The Old Mill, renovated or rebuilt several times, now serves as town hall.

At least three mills operated in the area of Rose Valley. Little remains except a silted-in dam pond of what may have been the earliest mill, located on Vernon Run near the present Pool and Tennis Club. Near the Bishop White House, on Ridley Creek, the remains of a dam and millrace can be seen leading up to the "Old Mill", which is now used as the town hall. Benninghove's snuff mill was likely built here c. 1789. Between 1826 and 1850, it was run as a paper mill. It was reconstructed as a textile mill in 1861 and burned down in 1885. After 1900, William Lightfoot Price built a furniture mill or craft shop on the foundations and later it was used as a meeting hall. After extensive fire damage, it was reconstructed into today's town hall.

Hutton's mill, on Rose Valley Road by Vernon Run, was built circa 1840 as a feed mill. In 1847, it became a turning mill. It was used to produce bobbins for the nearby textile mill as well as serving as a warehouse. Later, it produced sandpaper. William Lightfoot Price also reconstructed this mill into a meeting house and theater. It also suffered fire damage, was again reconstructed, and now houses the Hedgerow Theatre.

== Arts and Crafts project ==
Under the leadership of William Lightfoot Price, the Rose Valley Association was formed in July 1901 to start an intentional community based on the ideals of the Arts and Crafts movement. The association bought approximately 80 acres (32 ha) of land, an area that is the nucleus of today's borough. Investors contributed about $25,000 in capital, including $9,000 borrowed from nearby Swarthmore College to buy and improve the land. Price's vision placed artisan workshops at the center of the community, thus aligning with the socialist utopia that Arts and Crafts proponent William Morris described in his novel, News from Nowhere.

Price's liberal views led to some misconceptions about the project, according to his niece Eleanore Price Mather: "First, it was not a free love colony. Second it was not single tax .... And third, it was not communistic. Rose Valley was essentially an arts and crafts project."

Price had led a discussion group, including Edward Bok and brothers Samuel and Joseph Fels, and many in this group became investors or residents in Rose Valley. Other early residents included Hawley McLanahan, who became Price's architectural partner; McLanahan's father-in-law Charles T. Schoen; Price's employees at his architectural firm; and his relatives, including his brother Walter, also an architect. Feminist Anna Howard Shaw lived nearby. Administration of the project was in the form of a town meeting, called the "Folk Mote".

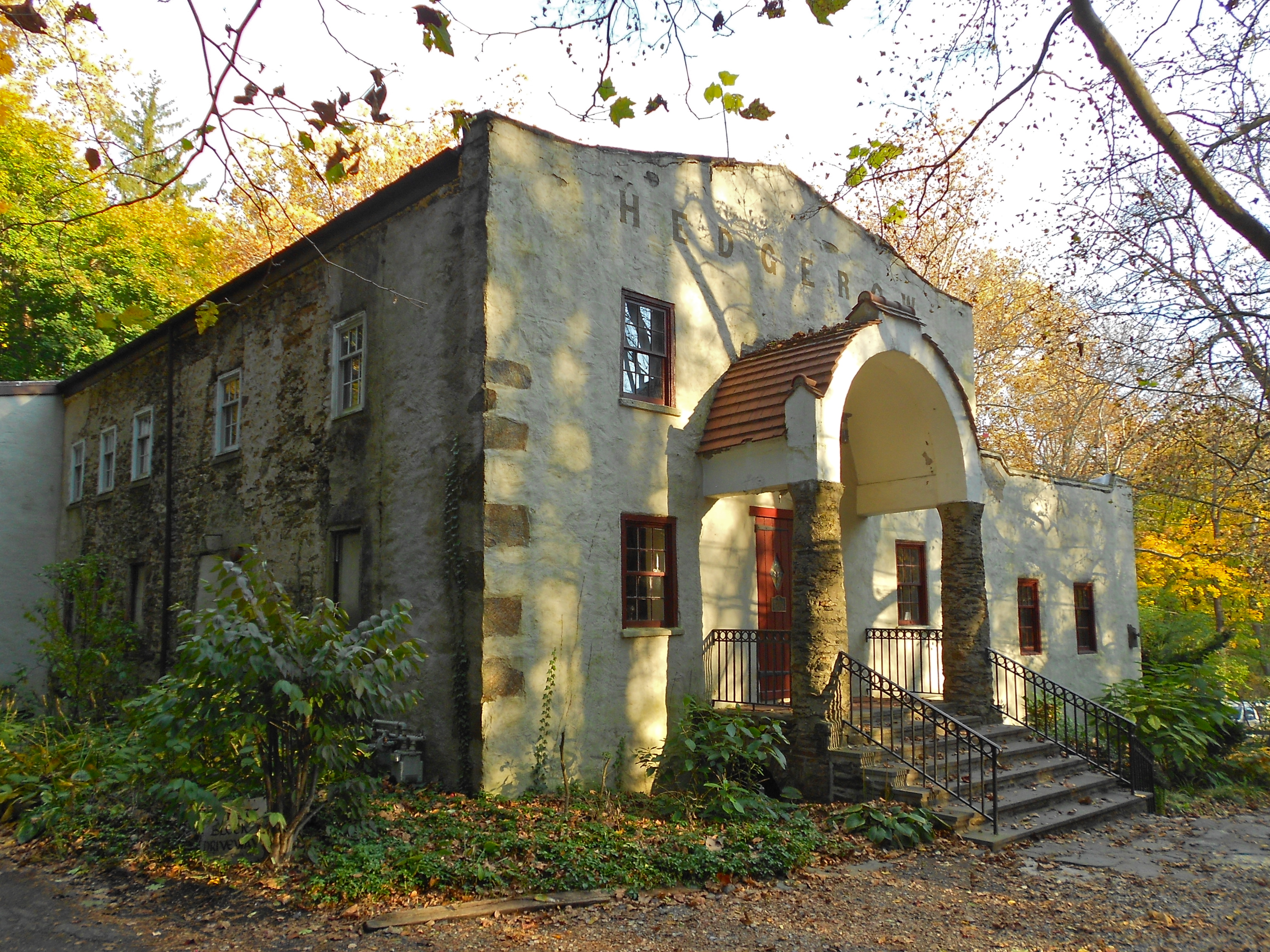
The old bobbin mill now houses Hedgerow Theatre.

The Rose Valley Association did not produce arts and crafts itself, but rather rented out working space to craftsmen, and provided them housing, generally designed or renovated by Price. The crafts were sold from Price's office at 1624 Walnut Street in Philadelphia. Furniture, as well as ceramics and book binding, were produced at the Old Mill until about 1907. A journal, The Artsman, was published from 1903 to 1907. An art gallery was located in the old bobbin mill, then called "Artsman's Hall", and, starting in 1904, run by well-known artist Alice Barber Stephens, who lived in the mill until a nearby barn was converted by Price into her house, Thunderbird Lodge. Artsman's Hall was also used for theater, with the first play The Carpet Bagger's Revenge presented on New Year's Eve, 1904. Eventually the building became used solely by the Hedgerow Theatre, which is still active.

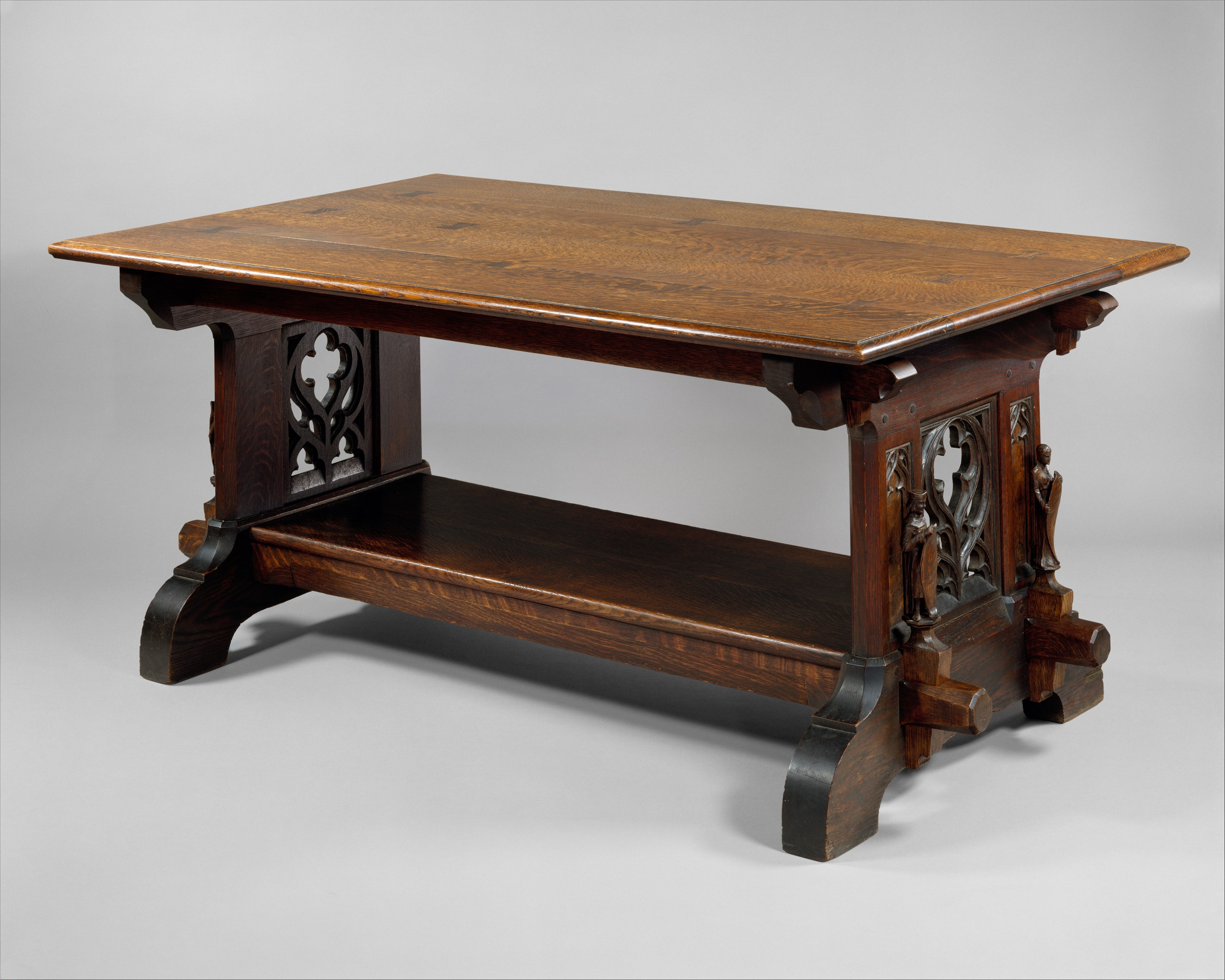
Library table made in Rose Valley in 1904, now at the Metropolitan Museum

By 1910, however, craft production had faded and the community had become essentially a commuter suburb of Philadelphia, using the nearby Moylan - Rose Valley Station. The buildings designed or renovated by Price during this period may be Rose Valley's major achievement. According to George E. Thomas, "Rose Valley is of exceptional importance, a major American architectural landmark."

After 1910 Schoen, McLanahan, and Price bought the remaining land from the Rose Valley Association, and Price designed the "Rose Valley Improvement Company Houses" near the old bobbin mill. As a group, these are the most important group of houses designed, rather than renovated, by Price in Rose Valley.

In 1926 a Pennsylvania State historic marker was installed on Rose Valley Road to the south of Thunderbird Lodge. It commemorates the Great Minquas Path, a Native American trail that ran nearby. It features a sculpture of a beaver by Albert Laessle.

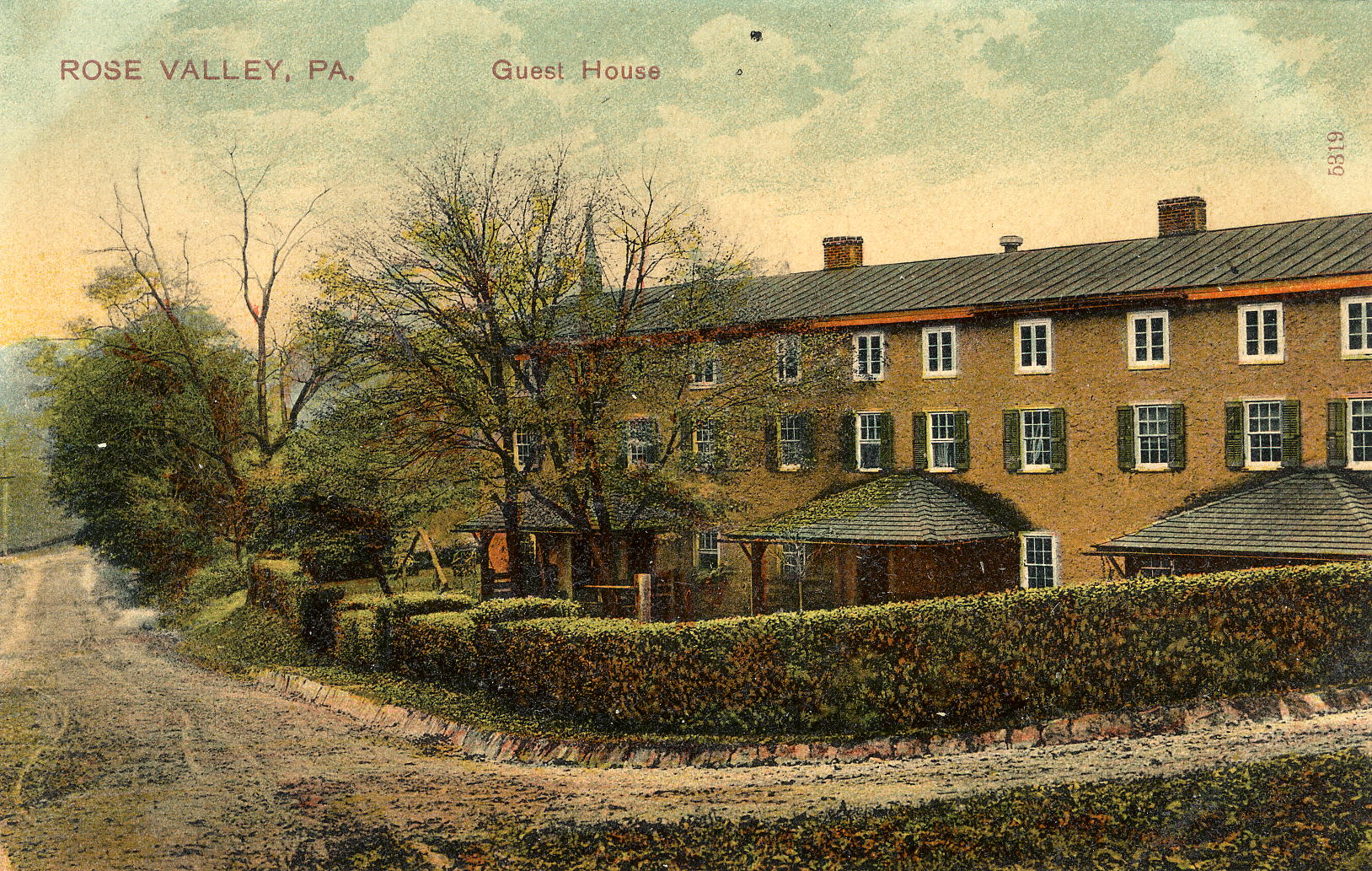
The Guest House c. 1904. This former mill workers' housing was renovated by William Lightfoot Price and served as the main housing during the early days of the arts and crafts colony

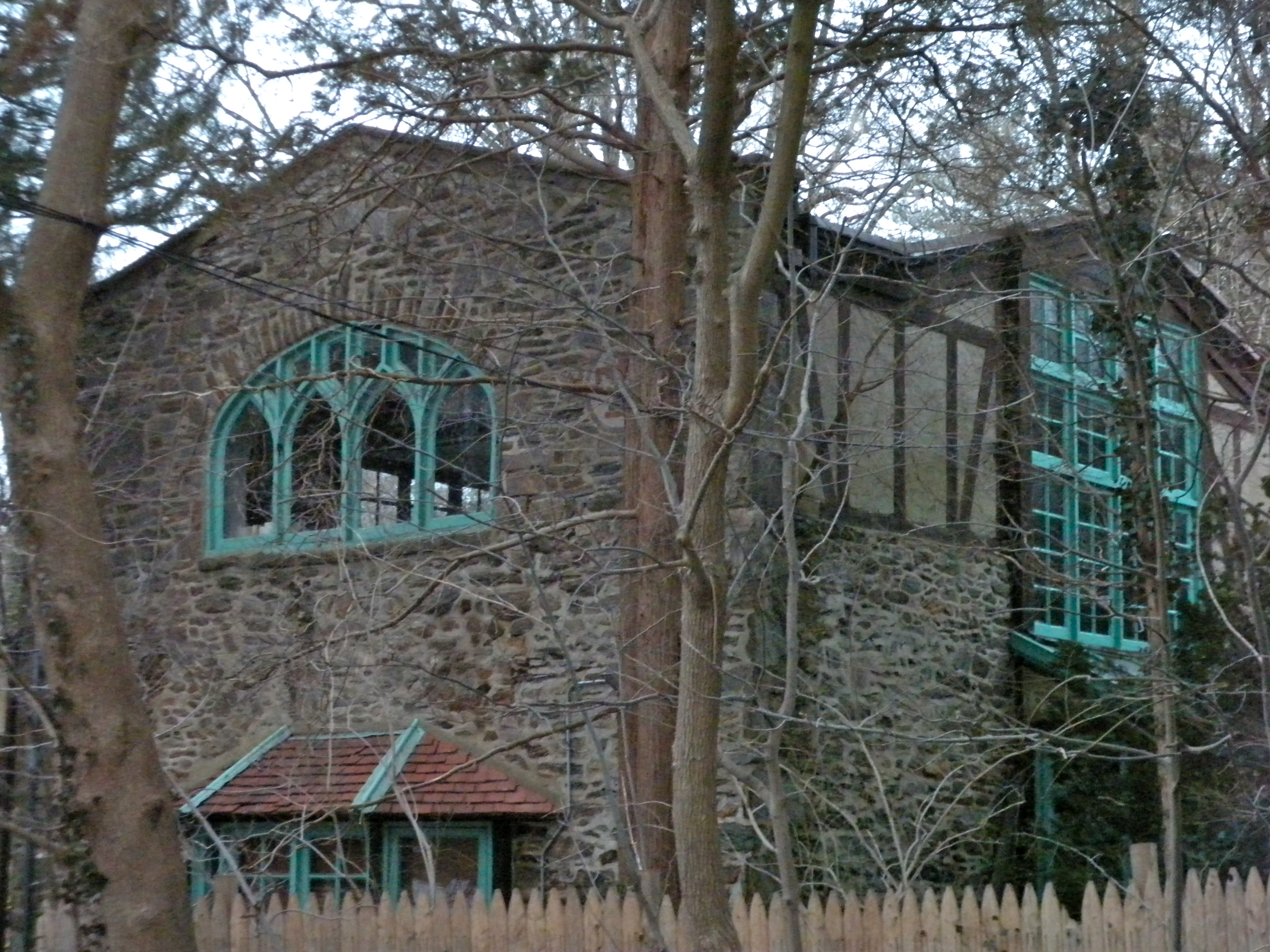
Thunderbird Lodge, now the Rose Valley Museum

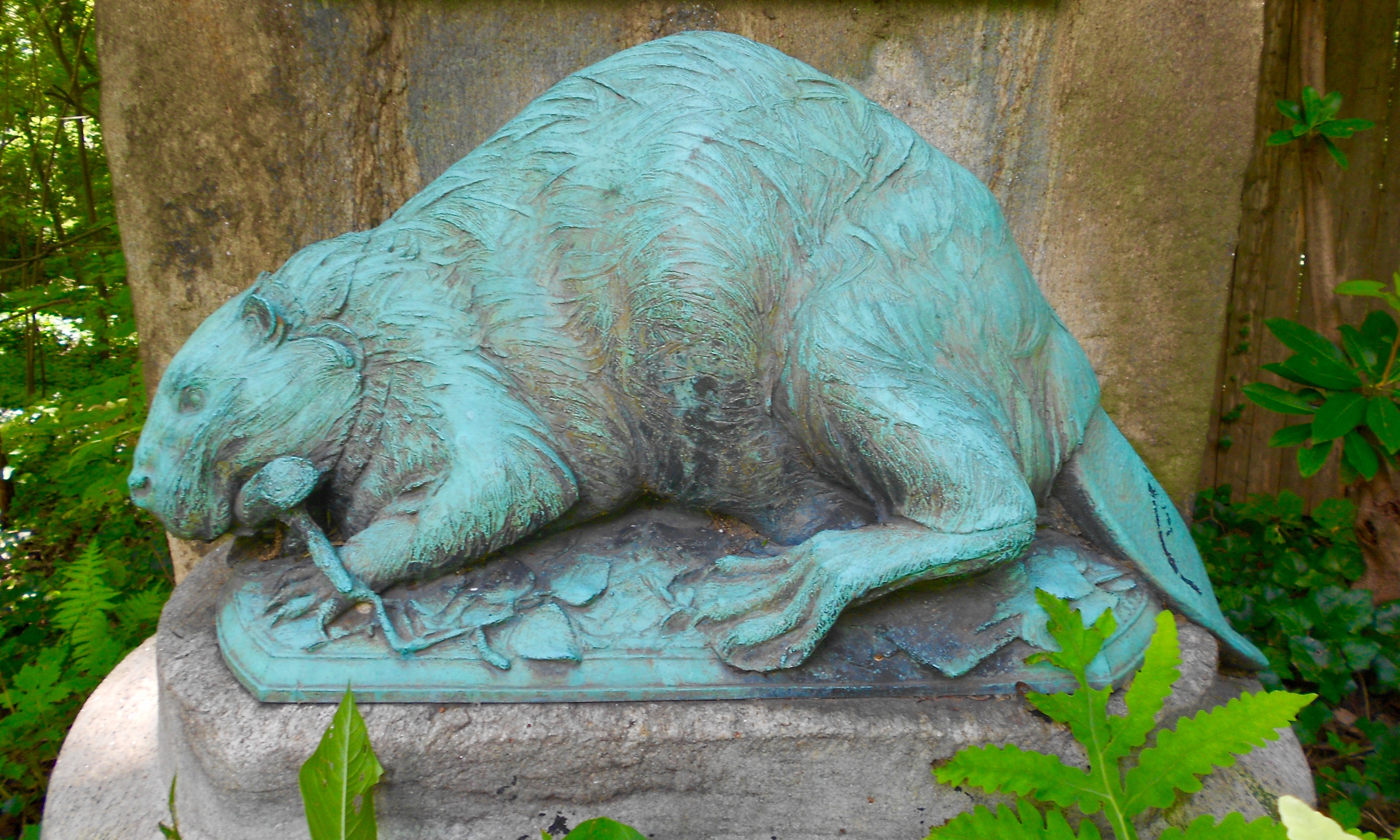
Beaver sculpture by Albert Laessle, part of a 1926 historic marker near Thunderbird Lodge

== Transportation ==
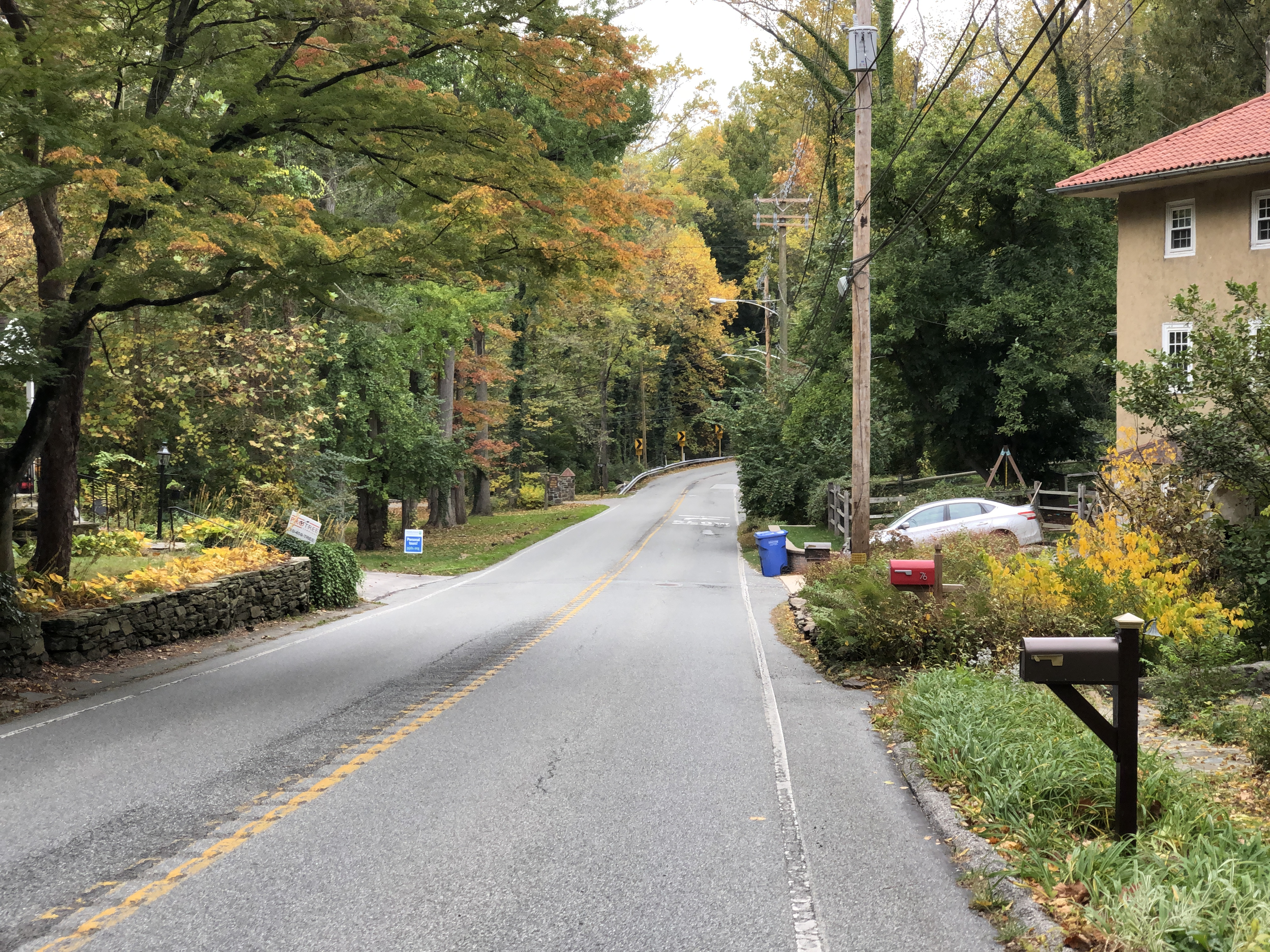
Rose Valley Road in Rose Valley

As of 2008 there were 5.02 miles (8.08 km) of public roads in Rose Valley, of which 1.30 miles (2.09 km) were maintained by the Pennsylvania Department of Transportation (PennDOT) and 3.72 miles (5.99 km) were maintained by the borough.

No numbered highways serve Rose Valley directly. Main thoroughfares include Rose Valley Road, which follows a northwest-to-southeast alignment through the heart of the borough, and Brookhaven Road, which follows a northeast-to-southwest alignment along the southeastern edge of the borough.

== Geography ==
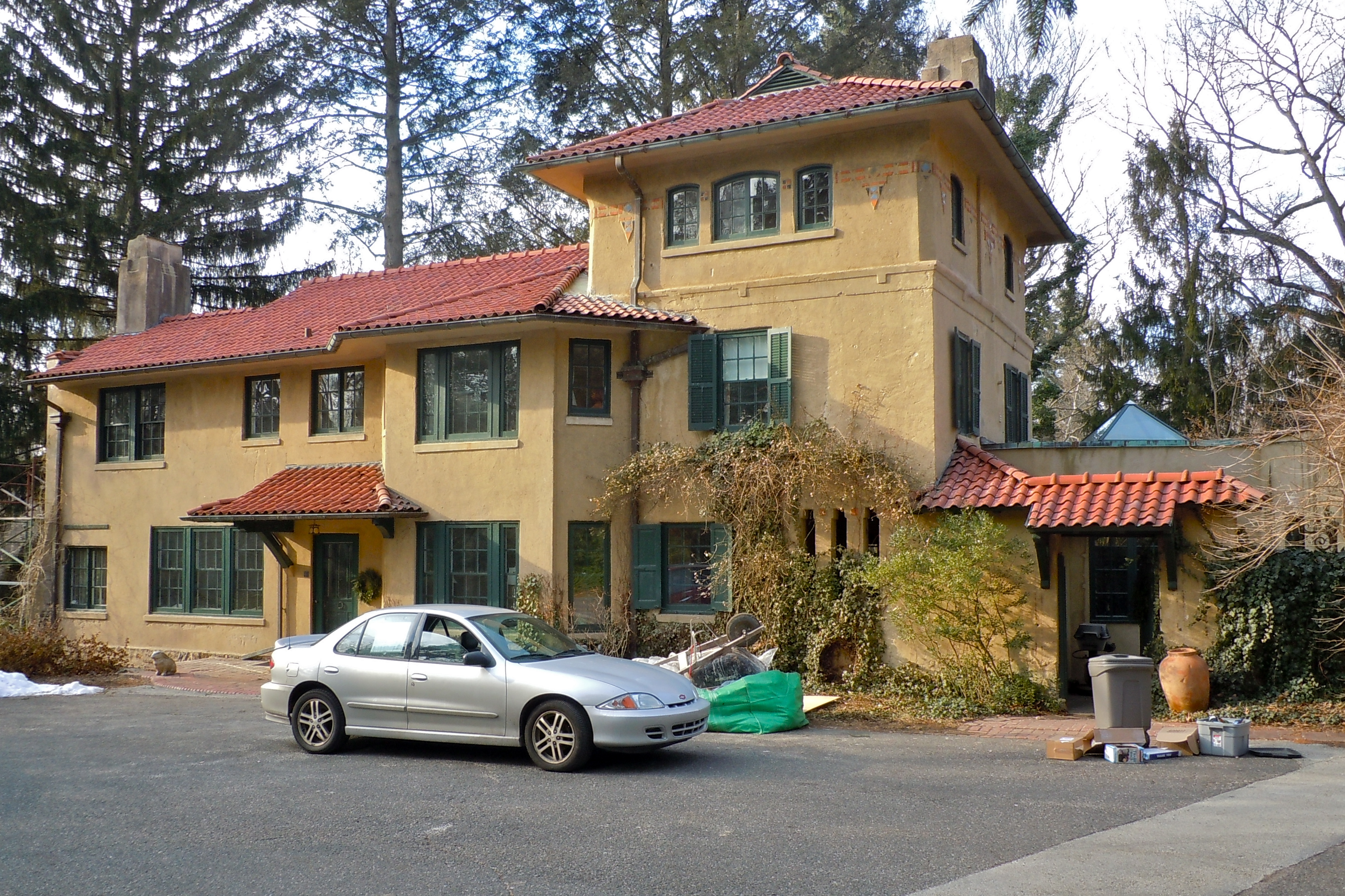
A Rose Valley Improvement Company house

Rose Valley is located in central Delaware County, 1.5 miles (2.4 km) south of Media, the county seat, and 4 miles (6 km) north of Chester. It is bordered by Nether Providence Township to the north, east, and south, and by Middletown Township to the west. Ridley Creek, a southward-flowing tributary of the Delaware River, forms the western boundary of the borough.

According to the U.S. Census Bureau, the borough of Rose Valley has an area of 0.73 square miles (1.9 km^{2}), all land. It has a humid subtropical climate (Cfa) and monthly average temperatures range from 32.6 °F in January to 77.6 °F in July. The local hardiness zone is 7a.

== Demographics ==
Historical population
Census	Pop.	Note	%±
1930	303		—
1940	359		18.5%
1950	498		38.7%
1960	626		25.7%
1970	876		39.9%
1980	1,038		18.5%
1990	982		−5.4%
2000	944		−3.9%
2010	913		−3.3%
2020	1,017		11.4%

As of Census 2010, the racial makeup of the borough was 93.1% White, 1.6% African American, 0.1% Native American, 2.8% Asian, 0.5% from other races, and 1.8% from two or more races. Hispanic or Latino of any race were 2.1% of the population.

As of the census of 2000, there were 944 people, 347 households, and 292 families residing in the borough. The population density was 1,332.8 inhabitants per square mile (514.6/km^{2}). There were 351 housing units at an average density of 495.6 units per square mile (191.4 units/km^{2}). The racial makeup of the borough was 95.34% White, 1.59% African American, 0.11% Native American, 1.69% Asian, 0.32% from other races, and 0.95% from two or more races. Hispanic or Latino of any race were 2.22% of the population.

There were 347 households, out of which 34.9% had children under the age of 18 living with them, 76.9% were married couples living together, 6.6% had a female householder with no husband present, and 15.6% were non-families. 12.7% of all households were made up of individuals, and 5.5% had someone living alone who was 65 years of age or older. The average household size was 2.72 and the average family size was 2.99.

In the borough the population was spread out, with 25.4% under the age of 18, 3.6% from 18 to 24, 19.6% from 25 to 44, 34.7% from 45 to 64, and 16.6% who were 65 years of age or older. The median age was 46 years. For every 100 females, there were 98.3 males. For every 100 females age 18 and over, there were 93.4 males.

The median income for a household in the borough was $114,373, and the median income for a family was $118,637. Males had a median income of $91,184 versus $47,031 for females. The per capita income for the borough was $54,202. About 1.7% of families and 2.4% of the population were below the poverty line, including none of those under age 18 and 1.9% of those age 65 or over.

== Notable people ==
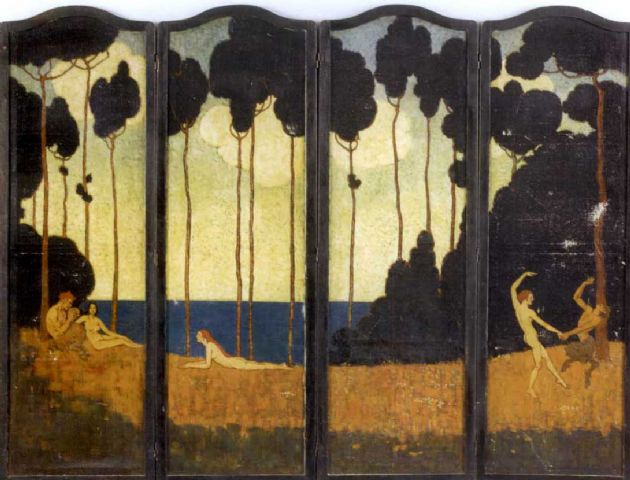
Rose Valley, folding screen c. 1903, by Elenore Abbott

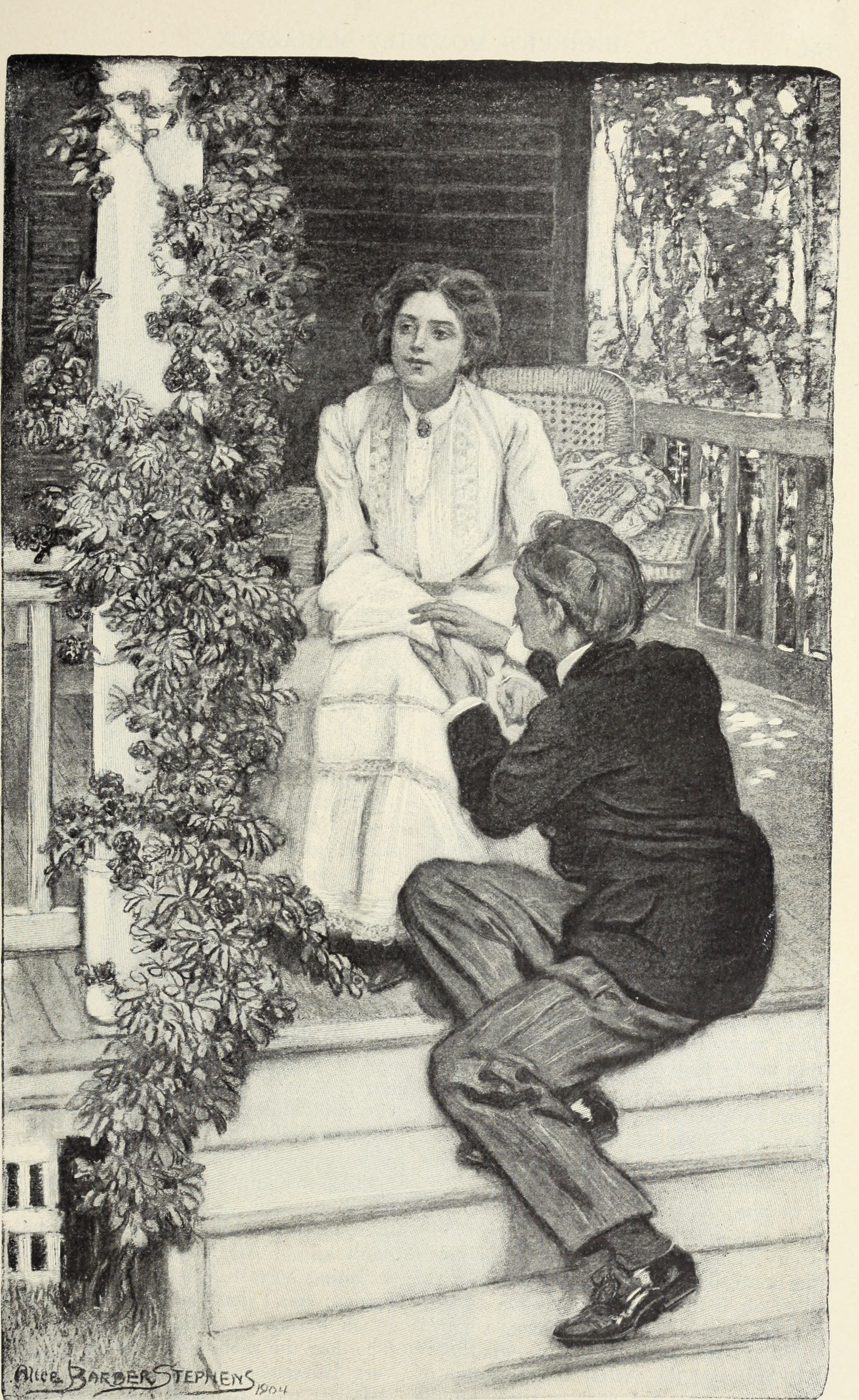
Harper's Magazine illustration by Alice Barber Stephens

- Elenore Plaisted Abbott, nationally known illustrator, designer, and artist
- C. Yarnall Abbott, photographer and author, husband of Elenore Abbott
- F. Townsend Morgan, WPA artist
- Margaret Scott Oliver, actress and playwright
- William L. Price, architect
- Alice Barber Stephens, artist
- Horace Traubel, poet and executor of Walt Whitman's estate

External videos
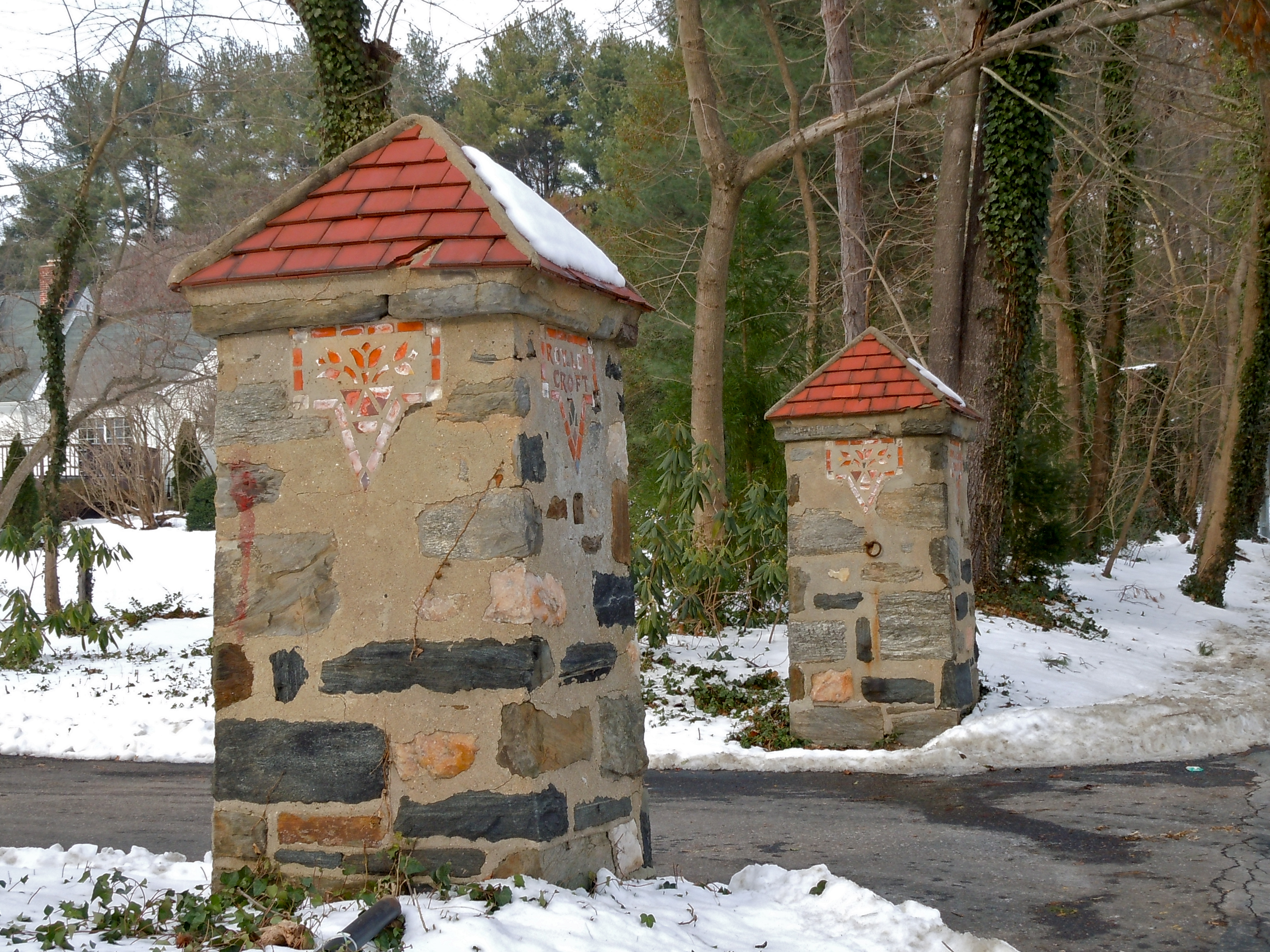
- Rose Valley, Pennsylvania
- The Old Mill - Rose Valley
- Hedgerow Theatre - Rose Valley
- Porter Lane - Rose Valley, PA

== Education ==
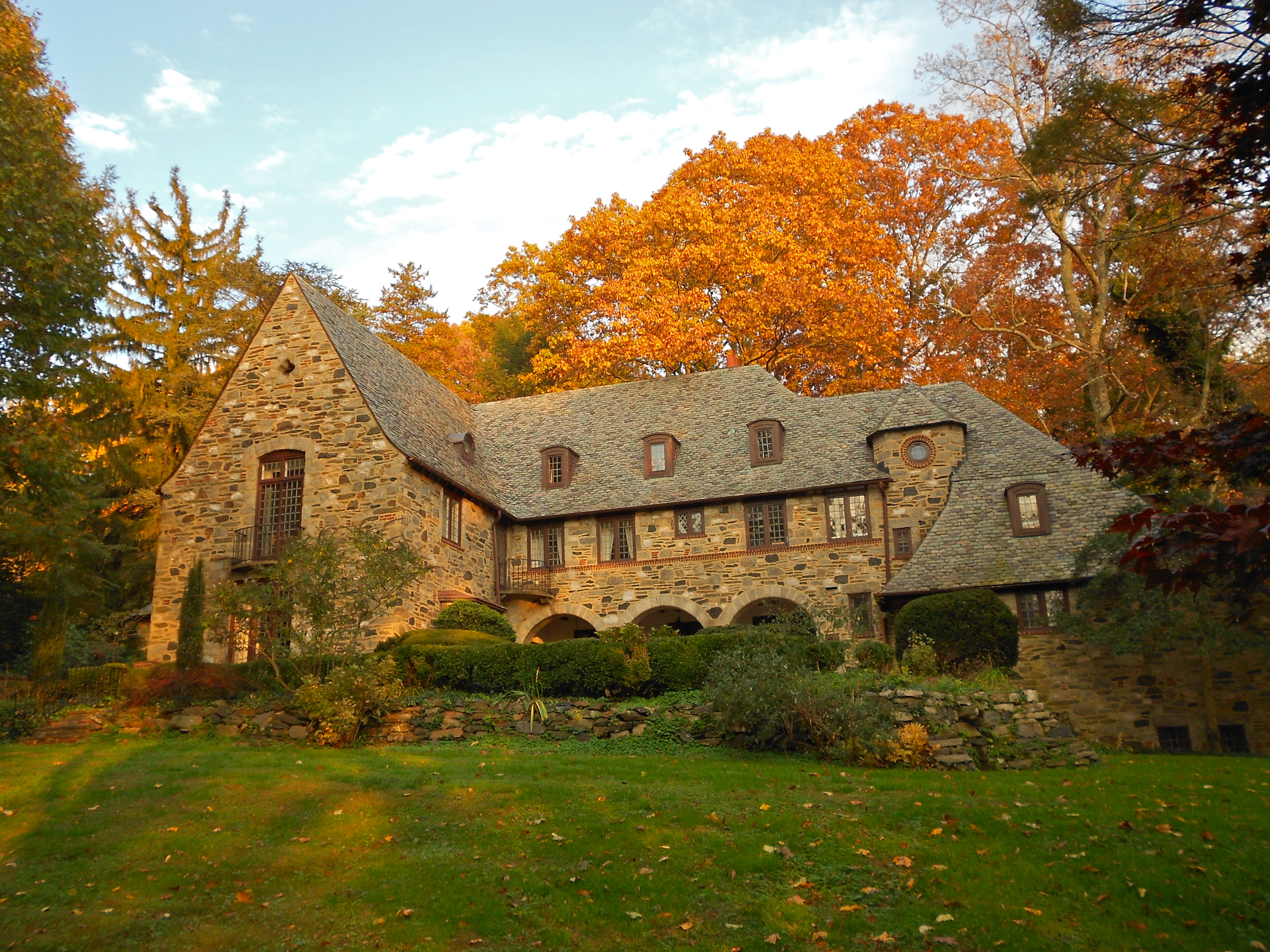
The house of architect Howell Lewis Shay on Possum Hollow Road

Rose Valley lies within the Wallingford-Swarthmore School District. Nether Providence Elementary School and Wallingford Elementary School serves students in grades K-5, Strath Haven Middle School serves students in grades 6–8, and Strath Haven High School serves students in grades 9–12.

=== See also ===
- National Register of Historic Places in Delaware County, Pennsylvania
- Fairhope, Alabama
- Arden, Delaware

== Sources ==
- Ham, Peter; Eleanore Price Mather; et al. (1973). A History of Rose Valley (Volume I). Borough of Rose Valley. p. 191.
- Taylor, Kathryn; George Greer; et al. (1998). A History of Rose Valley (Volume II). Borough of Rose Valley. p. 206.
- Davidson, Michelle (2010). Nether Providence, Images of America. Arcadia Pub. p. 128. ISBN 978-0738572635. ISBN 978-0-7385-7263-5., especially pp. 107–116.
- Thomas, George E. (2000). William L. Price, Arts and Crafts to Modern Design. Princeton Architectural Press. pp. 362. ISBN 1-56898-220-8., especially pp. 83–90.
- Sippel, Elizabeth Tighe (1995). The Improvement Company Houses, Rose Valley, PA: The Democratic Vision of William L. Price. MS thesis at the University of Pennsylvania. p. 175.
