= Whistling in the Dark (play) =

Play in three acts by Laurence Gross and Edward Childs Carpenter

Whistling in the Dark is a play in three acts by Laurence Gross and Edward Childs Carpenter. It premiered on Broadway at the Ethel Barrymore Theatre on January 19, 1932. The show was produced by Alexander McKaig and directed by Frank Craven. The cast included Ernest Truex as Wallace Porter, Claire Trevor as Toby Van Buren, and Edward Arnold as Jacob Dillon. It ran for 143 performances at that theatre and then closed. It re-opened soon after on Broadway at the Waldorf Theatre on November 3, 1932, with an entirely new cast in what was deemed a "revival"; although its creative team was the same. It ran for 122 additional performances at the Waldorf, and collectively in ran on Broadway for 265 performances between the two theaters. The Waldorf production closed in February 1933.

== Adaptations ==
- Whistling in the Dark (1933 film)
- Whistling in the Dark (1941 film)
