= Edward Childs Carpenter =

American novelist and screenwriter

- Born: December 13, 1872; Philadelphia, Pennsylvania, US
- Died: October 7, 1950 (aged 77); Torrington, Connecticut, US
- Occupations: Novelist; playwright; stage director
- Years active: 1903–1944

Edward Childs Carpenter (1872–1950) was an American writer of novels and plays and a stage director in the early through mid-20th century.

== Biography ==
Carpenter was born December 13, 1872 (1874 per his gravestone) at Philadelphia, Pennsylvania, a son of Edward Payson and Frances Bradley "Fanny" (née Childs) Carpenter, of the New England Rehoboth Carpenter family.

After leaving school, Carpenter became a newspaperman and quickly rose to the position of financial editor at The Philadelphia Inquirer. In 1903 he published his first novel, The Chasm, co-authored with Reginald Wright Kauffman, which received favorable reviews. On June 1, 1907, Carpenter married the illustrator Helen Alden Knipe; later they collaborated as writers.

Carpenter began writing plays while working at the Inquirer from 1905 to 1916, beginning with The Dragon Fly in 1905 (with Luther Long), followed by a dramatization of his own 1906 novel Captain Courtesy, which was later made into a silent film of the same title, Captain Courtesy. His longest-running plays were The Cinderella Man in 1916, with 192 performances, The Bachelor Father in 1928, with 264 performances (later made into a film, The Bachelor Father), and Whistling in the Dark, co-authored with Laurence Gross, in 1932, with 144 performances (also later made into a film, Whistling in the Dark).

From 1924 to 1927, Carpenter was president of the Dramatists' Theatre, Inc. In 1922, he became the second elected president of the Dramatists Guild of America. He was re-elected in 1929 continuing on as the Guild's fifth president until 1935. He was a member of the Franklin Inn Club in Philadelphia, and The Players and The Lambs clubs in New York City.

Carpenter died in Torrington, Connecticut on October 7, 1950. He and his wife, writer and illustrator Helen Alden (née Knipe) Carpenter, are interred in Town Hill Cemetery in New Hartford, Connecticut.

== Works ==
Year	Title	Genre
1903	The Chasm	Book (with Reginald Wright Kauffman)
1905	The Dragon Fly	Play (with John Luther Long)
1906	Captain Courtesy: A Tale of Southern California	Book (Illustrated by Elenore Plaisted Abbott)
1906	Remembrance	Play
1907	The Code of Victor Jallot; a Romance of Old New Orleans	Book (Illustrated by Elenore Plaisted Abbott)
1909	The Barber of New Orleans	Play
1911	The Challenge	Play
1912	The Easy Mark	Book
1913	The Tongues of Men	Play
1916	The Cinderella Man	Play
1916	The Cinderella Man, A Romance of Youth	Book (with Helen Knipe Carpenter)
1917	The Pipes of Pan	Play
1917	The Three Bears	Play
1920	Bab (dramatization of the novel by Mary Roberts Rinehart)	Play, Comedy
1921	Pot Luck	Play, Comedy
1923	Connie Goes Home	Play, Comedy
1926	Scotch Mist	Play, Comedy
1928	The Bachelor Father	Play
1932	Whistling in the Dark	Play, Farce, Melodrama
1933	Melody	Play, Musical, Romance
1934	Order Please	Play, Comedy
1942	Shylock's Daughter	Play, Drama (with Helen Knipe Carpenter)
1942	Queen of the South; from Ancient Rabbinical & Persian Legends	Play
1944	Public Relations	Play
