= Frederick Lauer Monument =

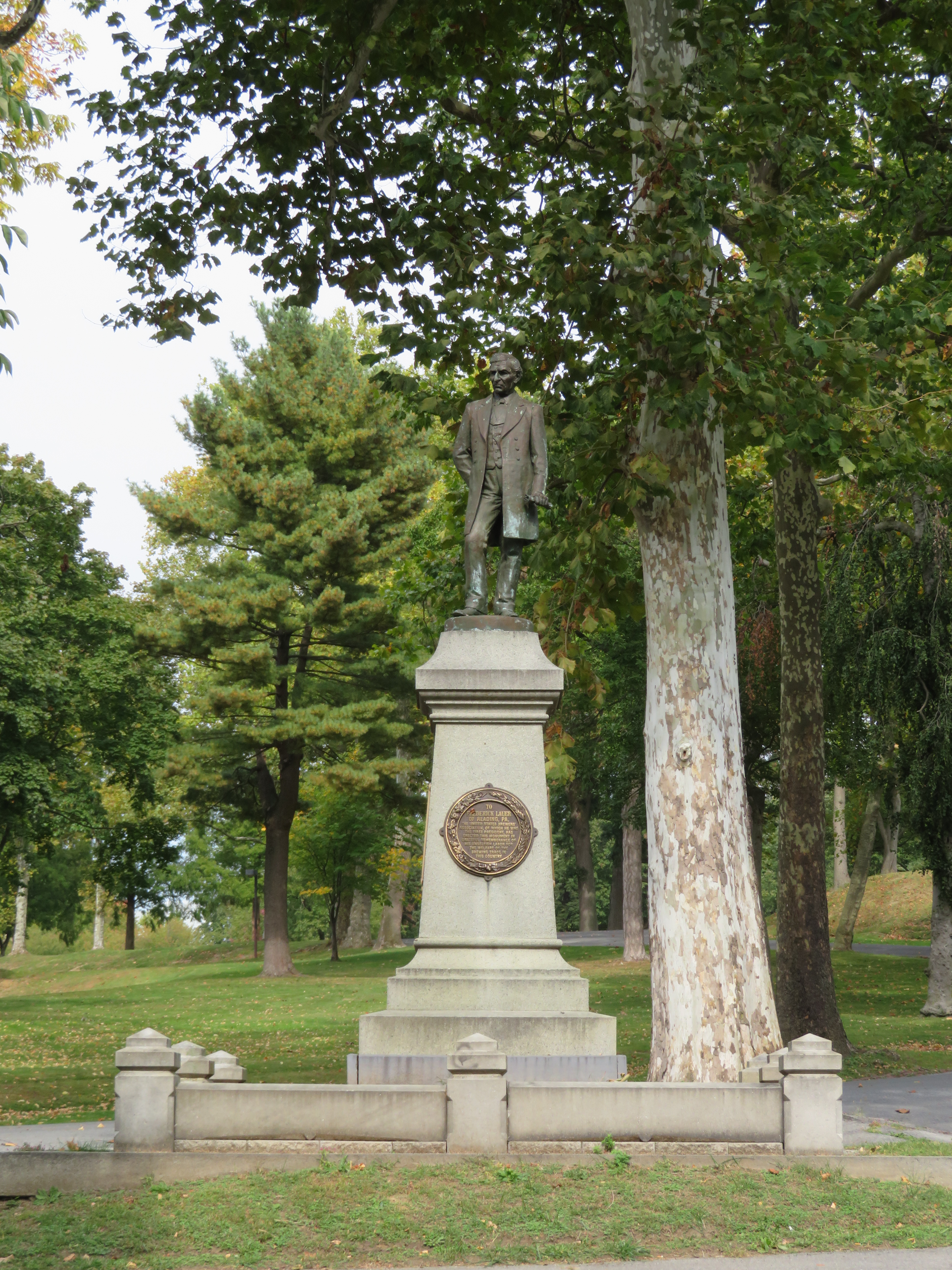
- The monument in 2020
- Interactive map of Frederick Lauer Monument
- Location: City Park, Reading, Pennsylvania, United States
- Coordinates: 40°20′5″N 75°54′52″W
- Designer: George F. Stephens
- Builder: Bureau Bros. (casting); P. F. Eisenbrown, Sons & Company (stonework)
- Type: Statue
- Material: Bronze, Granite
- Length: 5 feet (1.5 m)
- Width: 5 feet (1.5 m)
- Height: 16 feet (4.9 m)
- Dedicated date: May 23, 1885
- Dedicated to: Frederick Lauer

Frederick Lauer Monument is a memorial in City Park, Reading, Pennsylvania, United States. It features a life-size bronze statue of Frederick Lauer, a German-born brewer who became a prominent citizen of the city and served as the first president of the United States Brewers' Association. The association commissioned the monument in his memory, which was designed by Philadelphia-trained sculptor G. Francis Stephens.

== History ==
Frederick Lauer was born in 1810 in the German town of Gleisweiler. Several years later, in 1823, his family emigrated to the United States, ultimately settling in Reading, Pennsylvania. He learned the process of beer brewing from his father and operated his own brewery in Reading as an adult, employing many German immigrants who lived in the area. During his time as a brewmaster, Lauer also became involved in politics and philanthropic ventures. He was involved in several different charity organizations, as well as the local agricultural society and board of trade, and he was instrumental in getting Reading reclassified from a borough to a city. In the national brewing industry, Lauer helped form the United States Brewers' Association, an industry trade group formed during the American Civil War. He served as the first president of this group, which today is known as the Beer Institute. In 1883, he retired from brewing, and he died on September 12 of that year.

Following his death, the Brewers' Association wanted to honor Lauer with a monument in his hometown. After receiving consent from the city council to erect a monument in Reading's City Park, the group proceeded to completely fund the creation of a public statue of Lauer. This monument would be the first public statue in both the park and the city as a whole. Despite some opposition from members of the temperance movement, the city was generally supportive of the monument based on Lauer's philanthropy and public service. According to a later article on the statue published by the Historical Society of Berks County, "Frederick Lauer was represented in the first monument erected in Reading because he embodied the ideals of a large part of his community". Several other monuments and memorials were later built in the park.

The statue was designed by George F. Stephens and cast by the Bureau Bros, while the stonework was carried out by P. F. Eisenbrown, Sons & Company. (Note: Sources differ slightly on the designer and fabricator of the statue. An 1884 article in the Philadelphia-based magazine The American stated that George F. Stephens had designed the statue, while a 1992 article published by the Historical Society of Berks County states that "Henri Stephens" was the sculptor. Per the monument's entry in the Smithsonian Institution Research Information System (SIRIS), the statue bears founder's marks that read "Henrici Stephens". Meanwhile, a 1924 book edited by Anna Margaretta Archambault states that the monument was "designed and made by P. F. Eisenbrown, Sons & Company, Reading". Per SIRIS, the statue also bears founder's marks that read "cast by / Bureau Bros.") The monument was dedicated on May 23, 1885, with a parade held through the city. Many stores closed for the day, while the parade included many city officials, police, and firefighters. During the dedication ceremony, Henry H. Reuter, a former president of the Brewers' Association, gave an oration, during which he said, "Frederick Lauer stands there, for us, as the exemplar of true temperance, as the champion of personal liberty, as the exponent of the just claims of our time-honored trade, as its ever-ready defender and untiring promoter. Frederick Lauer felt and understood his social mission as a brewer".

=== Later history ===
In 1994, the monument was surveyed as part of the Save Outdoor Sculpture! project. In the years since its unveiling, the monument was suffered from deterioration and vandalism. In April 2015, four bronze plaques that were attached to the monument were stolen and never recovered. Around this same time, several brewing groups and local breweries began to spearhead efforts to restore the monument. These efforts were primarily led by the Brewers of Pennsylvania trade group, while the Brewers Association (not to be confused with the United States Brewers' Association) donated $25,000 towards the restoration. In 2018, the monument was rededicated following its restoration. The monument is maintained by the Historical Society of Berks County.

== Design ==
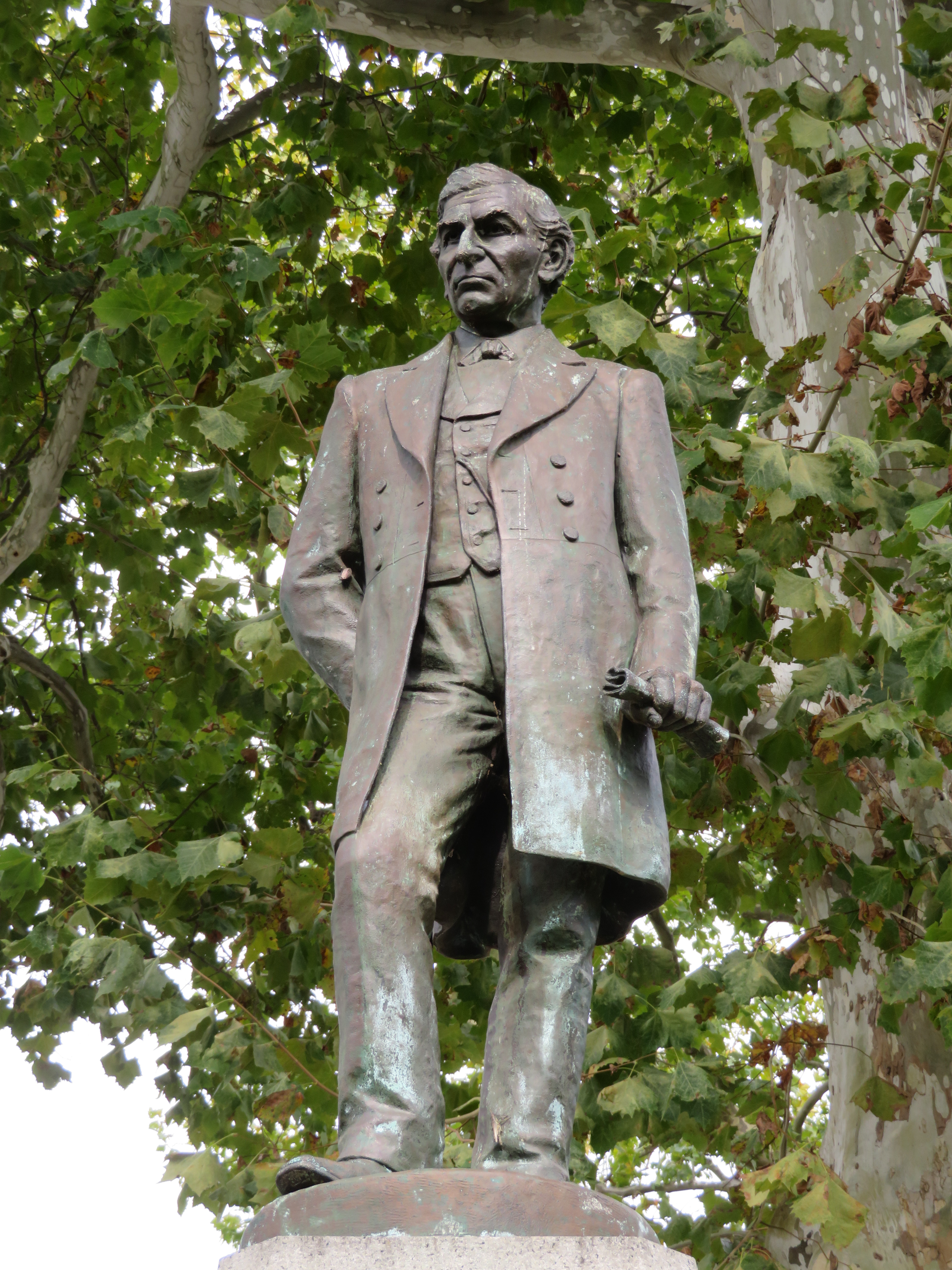
Closeup of the statue, 2020

The monument consists of a bronze statue of Lauer standing atop a multitiered granite pedestal and concrete base. The base of the monument is surrounded by an edged planter. Lauer wears an attire typical of the era, including a bow tie, frock coat, and vest, with his right hand on his hip and a paper scroll in his left hand. The sculpture measures 18 inches (46 cm) on either side and stands 6 feet (1.8 m) tall, while the pedestal has side measurements of 5 feet (1.5 m) and is 10 feet (3.0 m) tall. At the foot of the statue are inscriptions bearing the name of the designer ("Henrici Stephens") and the foundry ("cast by / Bureau Bros.").

Four bronze plaques are attached to the four sides of the pedestal. The inscription on the front reads: "To / Frederick Lauer / of Reading, PA / The United States Brewers / Association of which he was / the first President, has / erected this monument / in grateful rememberence (sic) of / his unselfish labor for / the welfare of the / brewing trade in this country.", while the rear plaque reads: "The City of Reading / commemorates the public / and private virtues of an honored citizen / by the grant of this location, / erected AD MDCCCXXXV / the year of the 25th convention of the U.S. Brewers Association." The two side plaques read: "LET HIS EXAMPLE TELL / THE BREWERS OF THIS / COUNTRY TO MAINTAIN / GOOD-FELLOWSHIP TO / PRESERVE THEIR ASSOCIATION / AND / TO DEFEND THEIR RIGHTS" and "His zeal sprung / from his firm conviction / that in striving to advance / the brewing trade / he was working for / the cause of national temperance".

== Sources ==
- "Notes". The American. VIII (216). Philadelphia: 396–397. September 27, 1884.
- Archambault, A. Margaretta, ed. (1924). A Guidebook of Art, Architecture, and Historic Interests in Pennsylvania. Philadelphia: John C. Winston Company. OCLC 477261.
- Kuhn, Andrew T. (Fall 1992). "Frederick Lauer: Reading's Philanthropic Brewer". Historical Review of Berks County. Historical Society of Berks County. Archived from the original on May 8, 2021.
- Mittelman, Amy (2003). "Lauer, Frederick (1810–1883)". In Blocker Jr., Jack S.; Fahey, David M.; Tyrrell, Ian R. (eds.). Alcohol and Temperance in Modern History: An International Encyclopedia. Vol. 1: A–L. Santa Barbara, California: ABC-Clio. p. 361. ISBN 978-1-57607-833-4. LCCN 2003008679. OCLC 249687468.
- Mittelman, Amy (2008). Brewing Battles: A History of American Beer. New York City: Algora Publishing. ISBN 978-0-87586-572-0. LCCN 2007036283. OCLC 1200873040.
- One Hundred Years of Brewing: A Complete History of the Progress Made in the Art, Science and Industry of Brewing in the World, particularly during the Last Century. Chicago: H. S. Rich & Co. 1901. LCCN 03010760. OCLC 1020229902.
- Rhen, Brad (August 25, 2021a) [August 20, 2015]. "First draft: Effort begins to restore statue of brewing pioneer". Reading Eagle. Archived from the original on March 22, 2022.
- Rhen, Brad (August 19, 2021b) [October 12, 2017]. "First Draft: Frederick Lauer statue in City Park to get more attention (Podcast)". Reading Eagle. Archived from the original on March 22, 2022.
- "Lauer Monument, (sculpture)". Smithsonian Institution Research Information System. Archived from the original on March 22, 2022.
- Vasil, Jim (July 10, 2020) [June 9, 2018]. "Statue of Reading brewing icon Frederick Lauer rededicated". WFMZ-TV. Archived from the original on November 3, 2019.
