= Frederick Lauer =

First president of the US Brewers Association

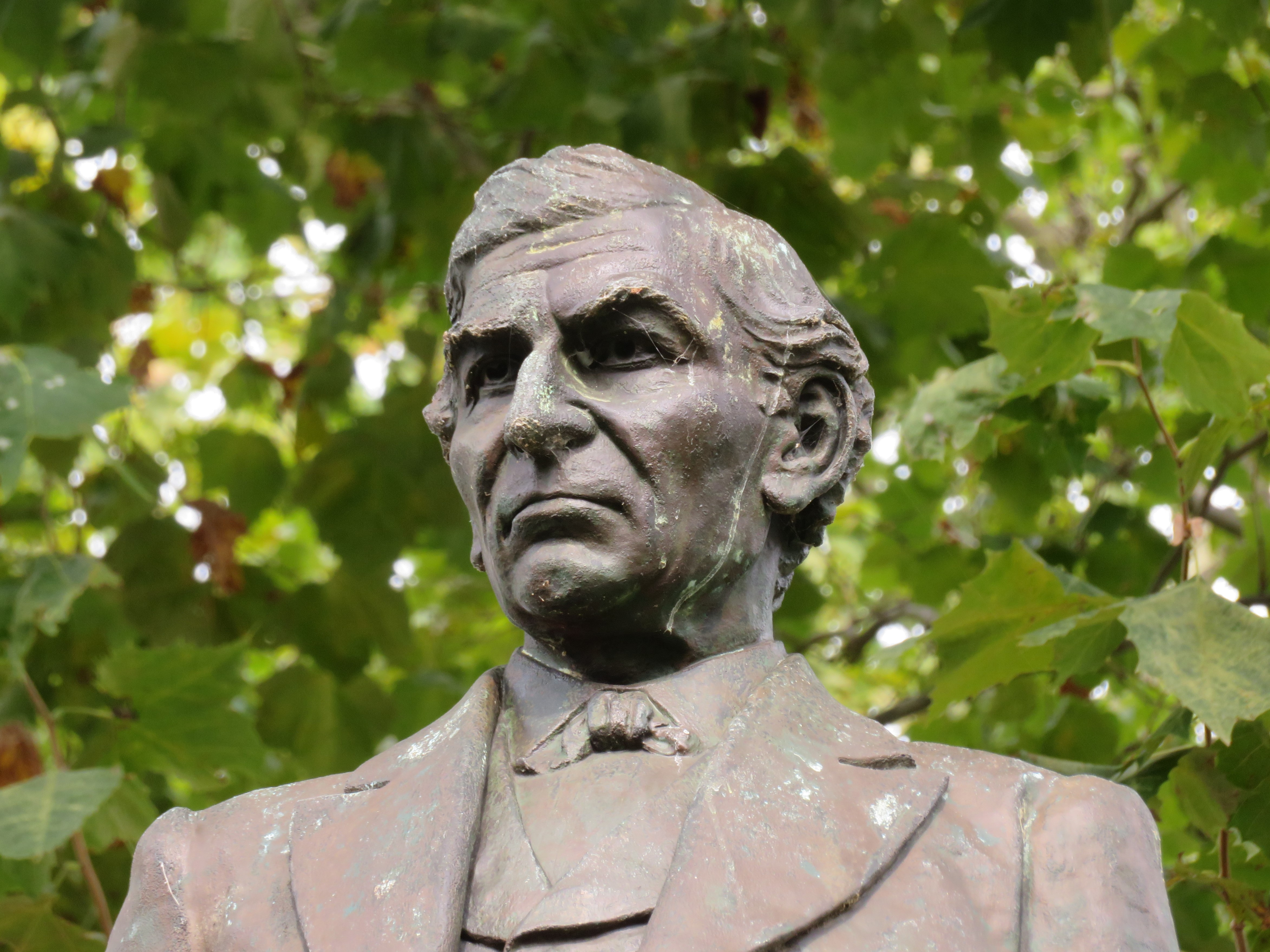
- Statue of Frederick Lauer, 1885
- Born: October 14, 1810; Gleisweiler, Kingdom of Bavaria
- Died: September 12, 1883 (aged 72); Reading, Pennsylvania, United States
- Monuments: Frederick Lauer Monument
- Occupation: Brewer
- Known for: First president of the United States Brewers' Association

Frederick Lauer (October 14, 1810 – September 12, 1883) was a brewer in the United States and the first president of the United States Brewers Association.

== Biography ==
Lauer was born on October 14, 1810, in Gleisweiler, Bavaria. He emigrated to Baltimore in 1822, moving with his family to Reading, Pennsylvania.

His two sons were Frank P. Lauer and George F. Lauer; he turned the business over to them in 1882.

Lauer died on September 12, 1883.

In 1885, the association erected the Frederick Lauer Monument in his honor in Reading's City Park.
