= Albert Lynch =

Parisian painter of German-Peruvian ancestry

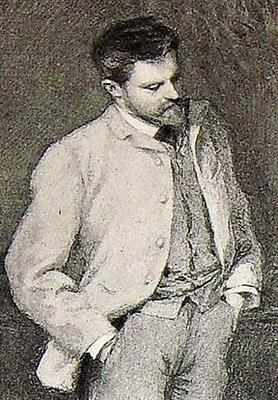
- Born: Alberto Fernando Lynch; 26 September 1860; Gleisweiler, Kingdom of Prussia
- Died: 1950 (aged 89–90); Monaco
- Occupation: Painter
- Spouse: Marie Anna Victoria Bacouel (m. 1896)
- Parents: Diego Lynch (father); Adele Bertha Emma Koeffler (mother)

Albert Lynch (1860–1950) was a French painter of German and Peruvian ancestry.

== Biography ==
Alberto Fernando Lynch was born on 26 September 1860 in Gleisweiler, Kingdom of Prussia, and baptised there on 21 March 1861. His father, Diego Lynch, had been born in Chachapoyas, Peru in November 1812, the son of a family of merchants, and had moved to Paris in the late 1840s. His mother was Adele Bertha Emma Koeffler (born 1834 or 1835), the daughter of Thomas Koeffler, a German landscape painter who was working in Paris in the 1850s. The two had married in New York on 9 May 1852.

The family returned to Paris, where Albert Lynch subsequently studied at l'École des Beaux-Arts, under the guidance of painters Jules Achille Noël, Gabriel Ferrier and Henri Lehmann. He showed a portrait at the Paris Salon of 1879, and continued to exhibit there regularly until at least 1934. At the Exposition Universelle of 1900 he received a gold medal.

The women of his time were his favorite subject to paint and he preferred pastel, gouache and watercolor although he occasionally worked in the oil technique. His work maintained the spirit of the Belle Époque. He illustrated such books as Lady of the Camellias by Alexandre Dumas, fils, Le Père Goriot by Honoré de Balzac and La Parisienne by Henry Becque.

Lynch moved to Monaco in 1930, where he died in 1950, survived by his wife Marie Anna Victoria Bacouel, who he had married in Paris on 28 October 1896.

Some confusion can be found in reference works about the dates and places of Lynch's birth and death. Given the strong anti-German feeling in Paris after the Franco-Prussian War of 1870–1871, Lynch seems to have been happy to play up the Peruvian side of his background, and it seems to have become generally circulated that he had been born in Peru, in Lima or Trujillo. A date of birth of 1851, and date of death of 1912, have also become frequently presented. None of this is correct.

== Gallery ==
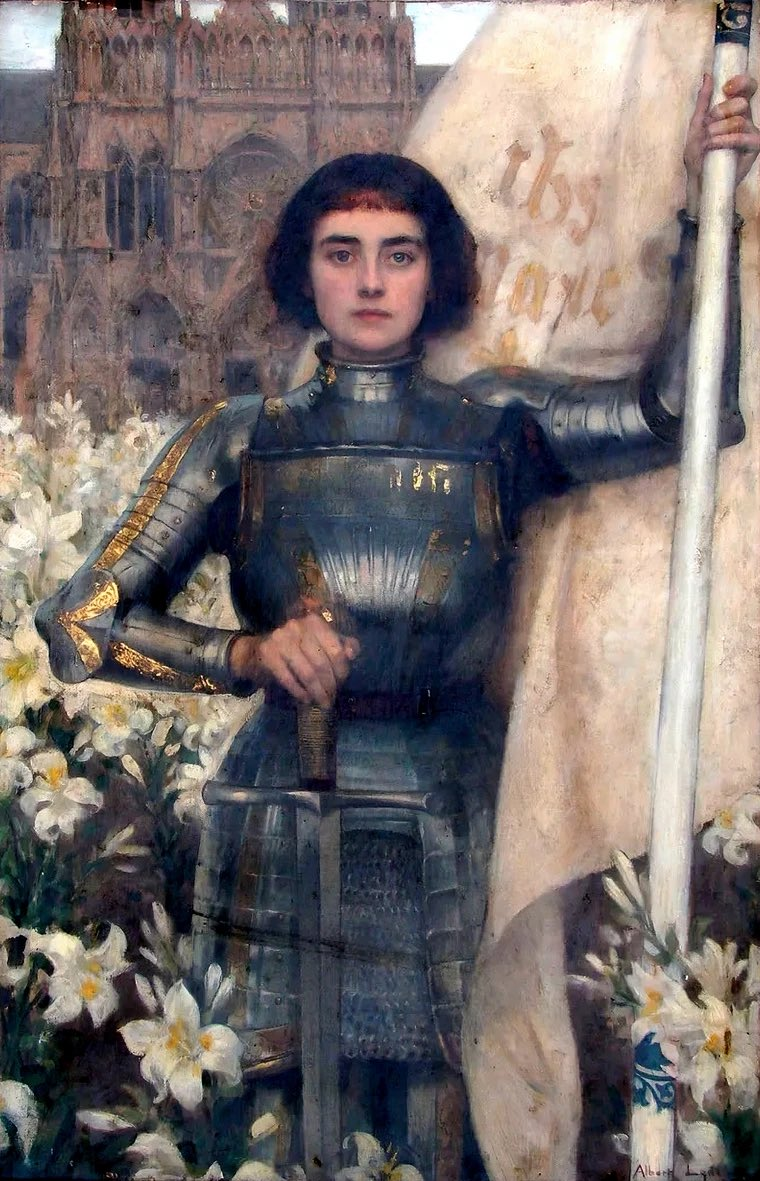
Joan of Arc

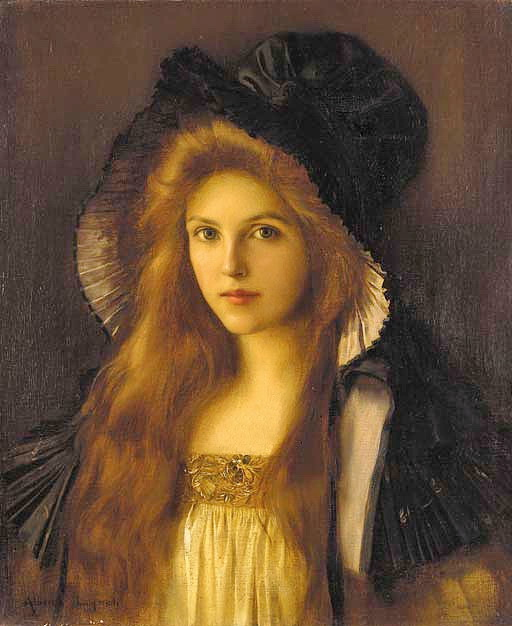
Beautiful Betty

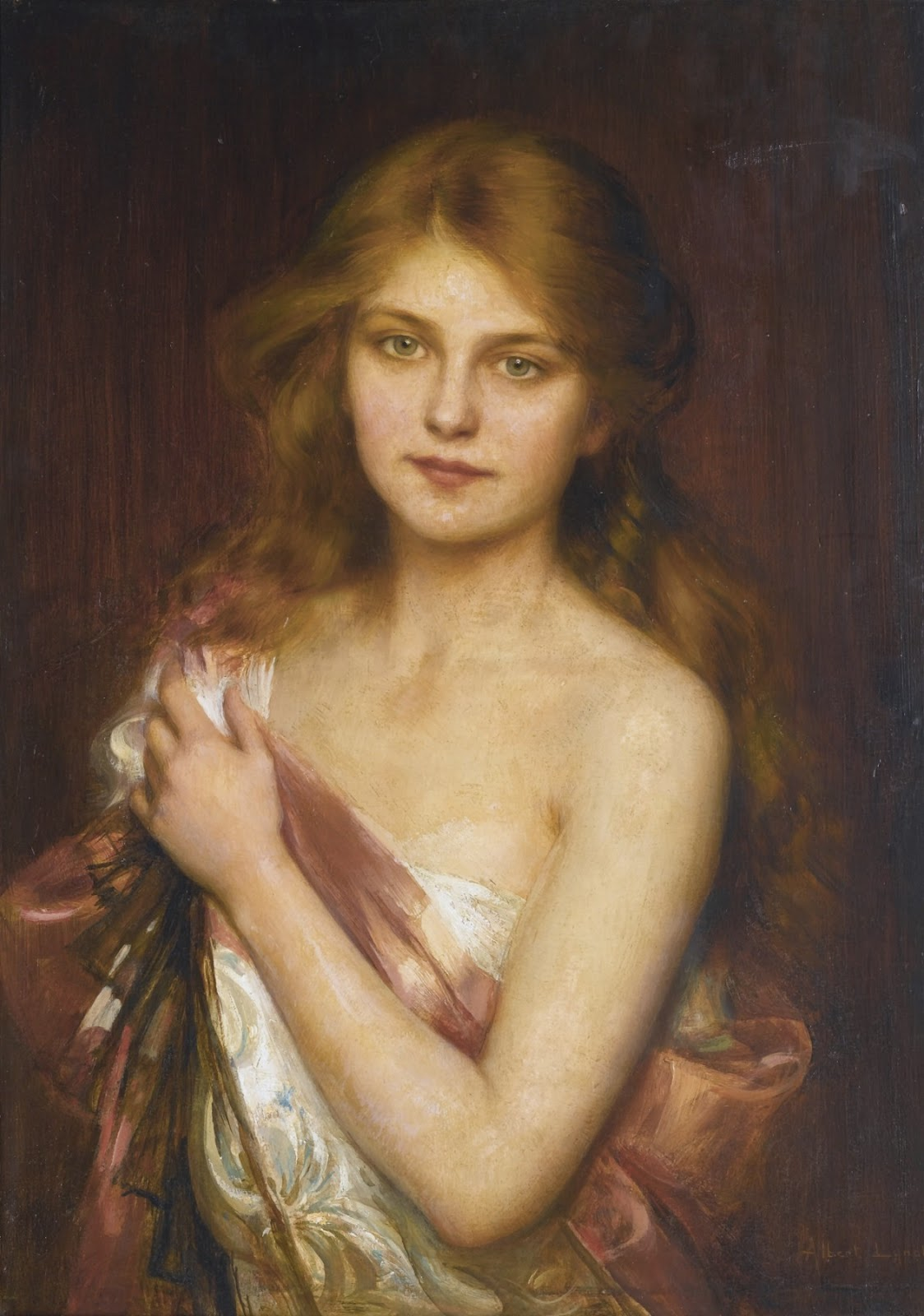
A Young Beauty

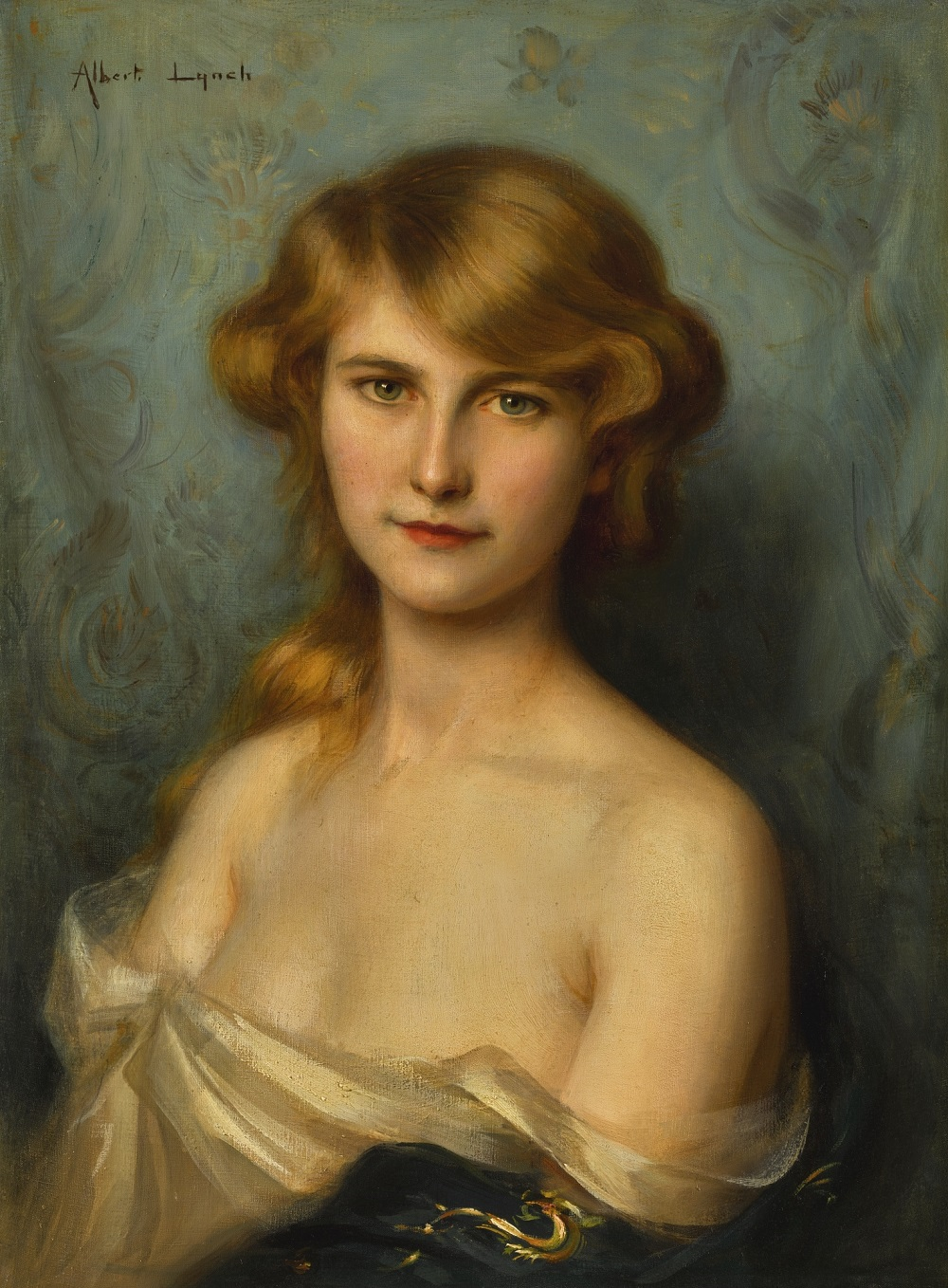
A Young Beauty With Red Hair

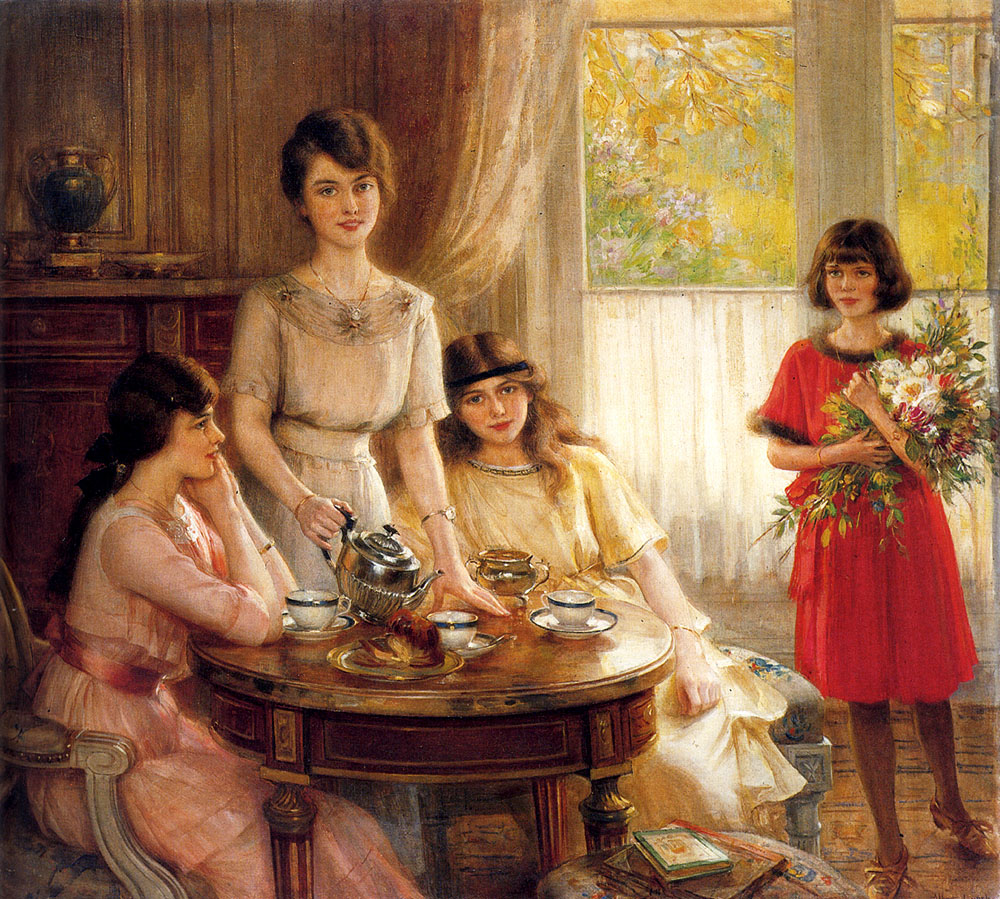
L'heure Du Thé (Tea Time)

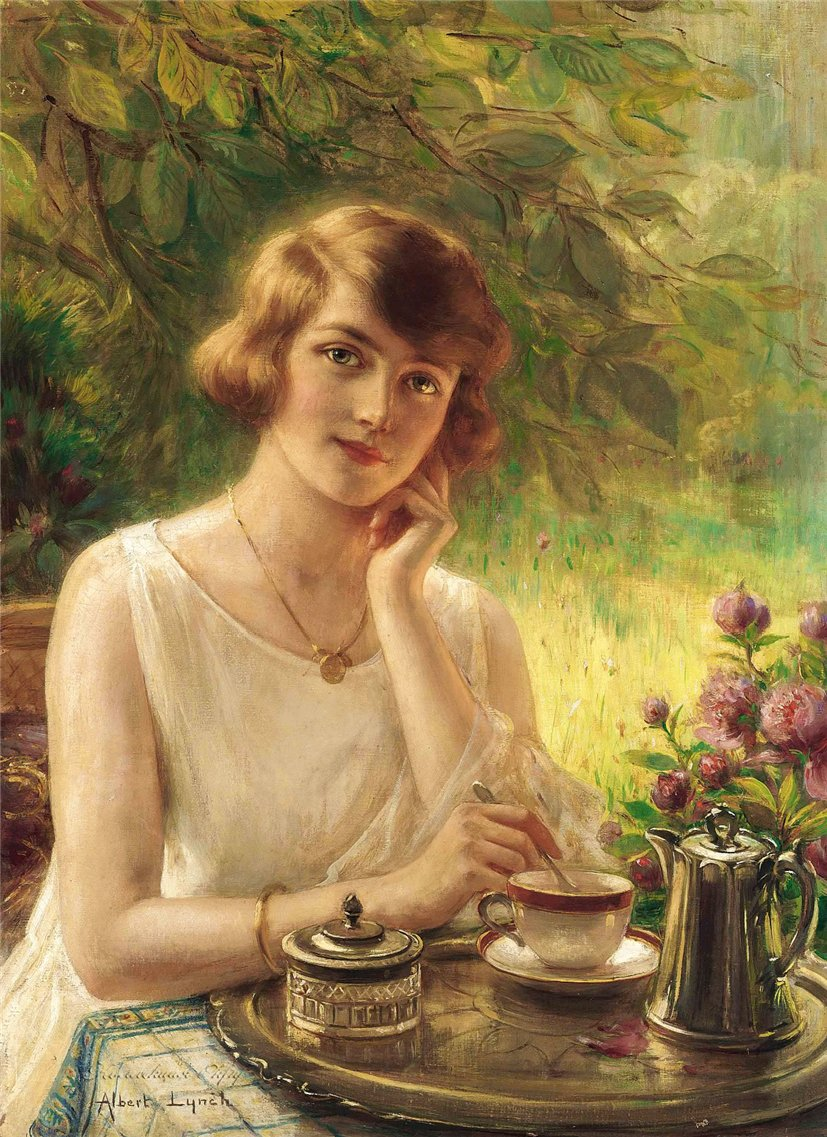
Une Femme Prenant le Thé (A Lady Having Tea)

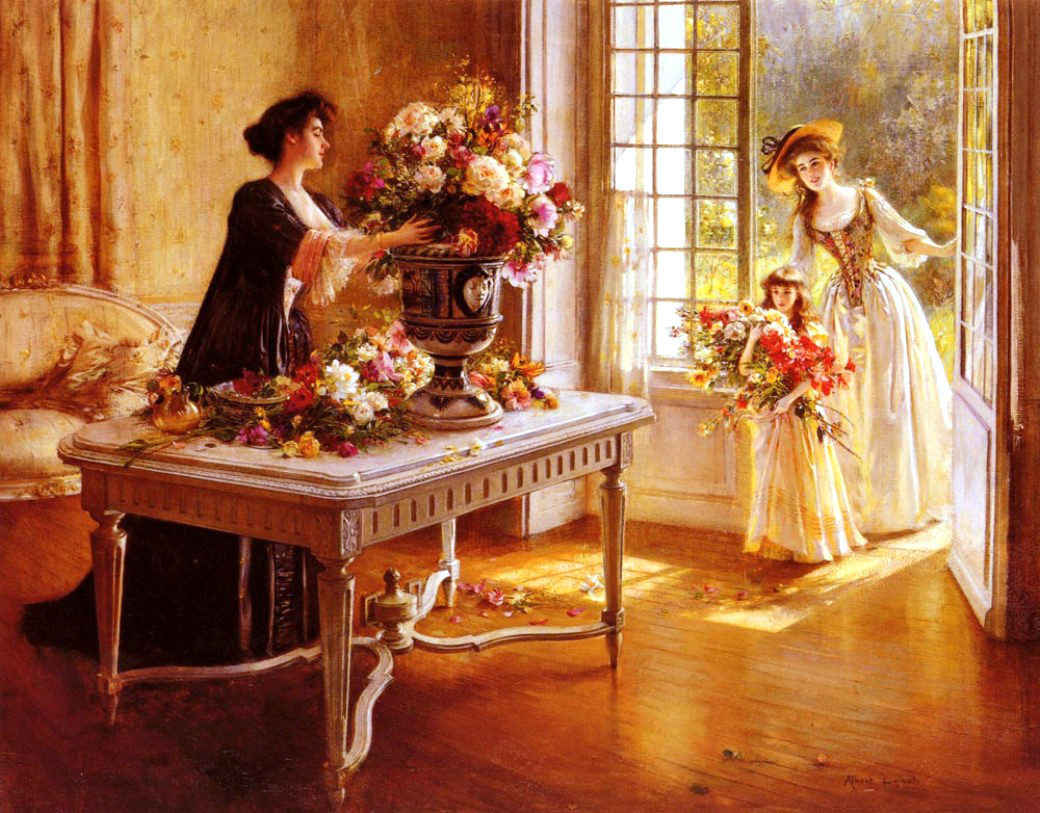
Fresh From The Garden

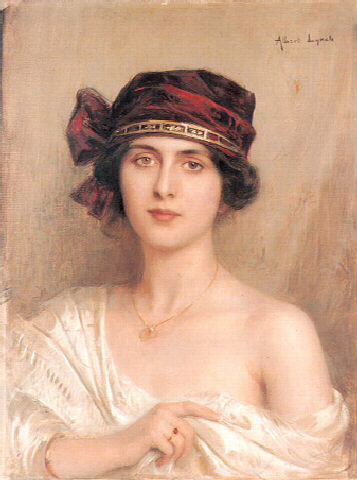
Portrait of a Young Woman, 1890

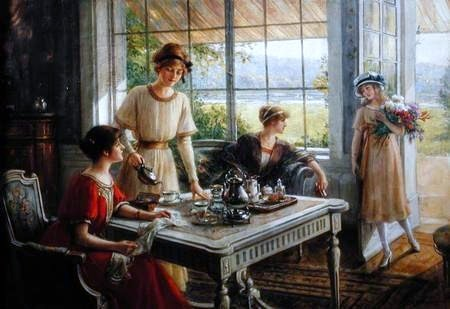
Femmes Prenant le Thé (Women Having Tea)

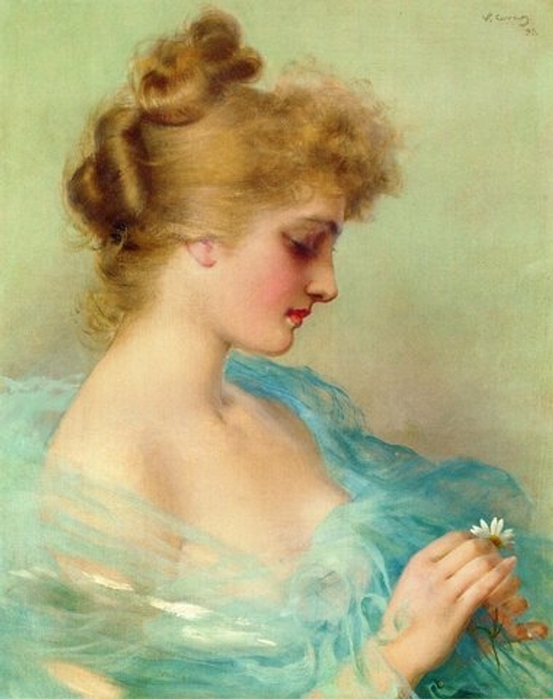
Portrait of a Woman, 1895

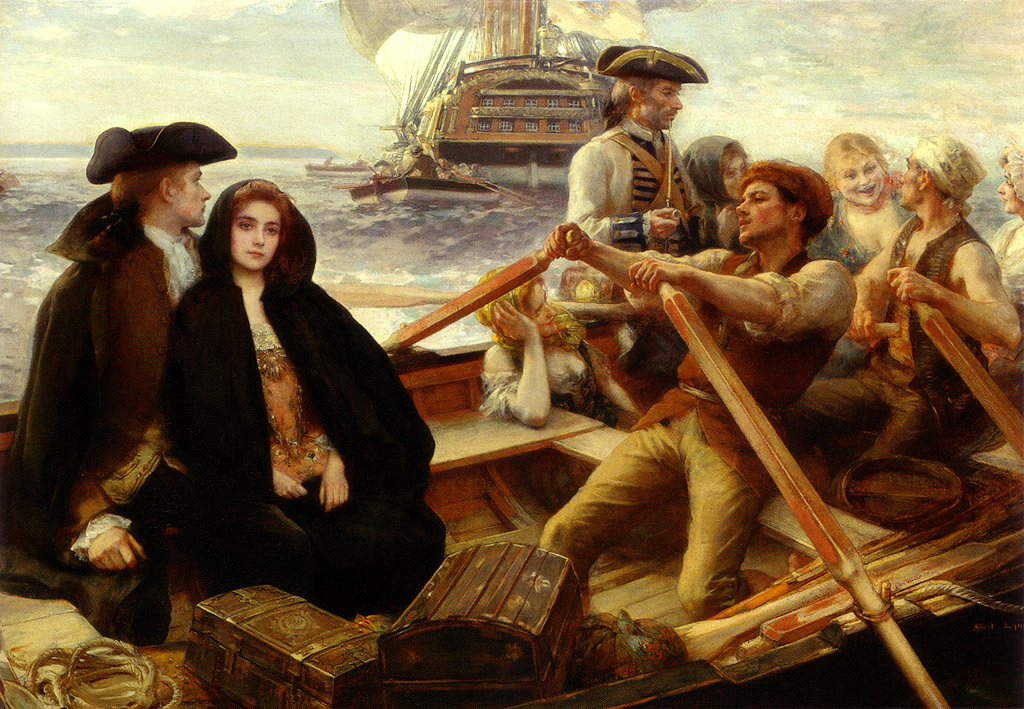
Manon Lescaut And Her Lover Des Grieux Are Set Ashore In Louisiana (1896)

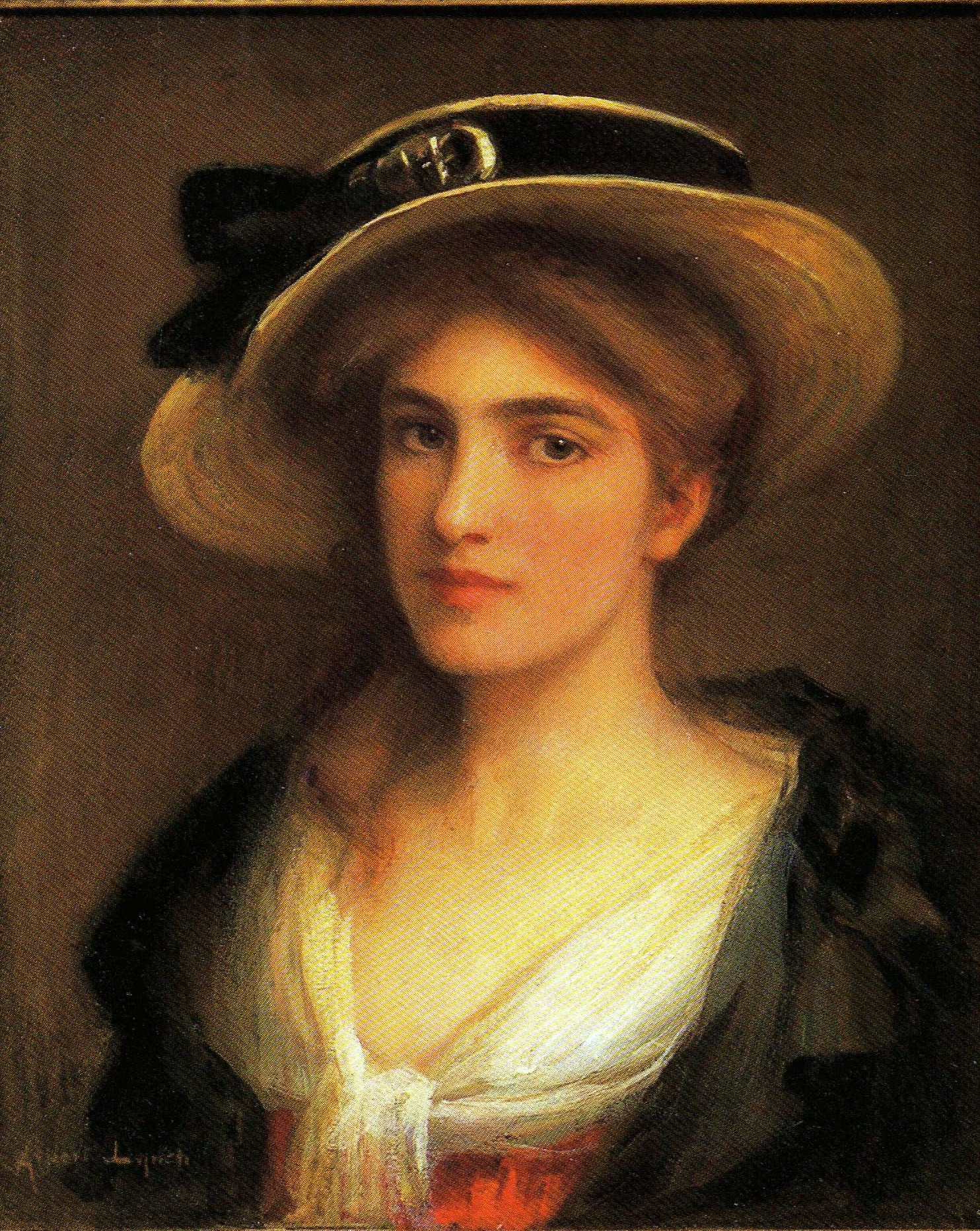
Young woman with a Hat

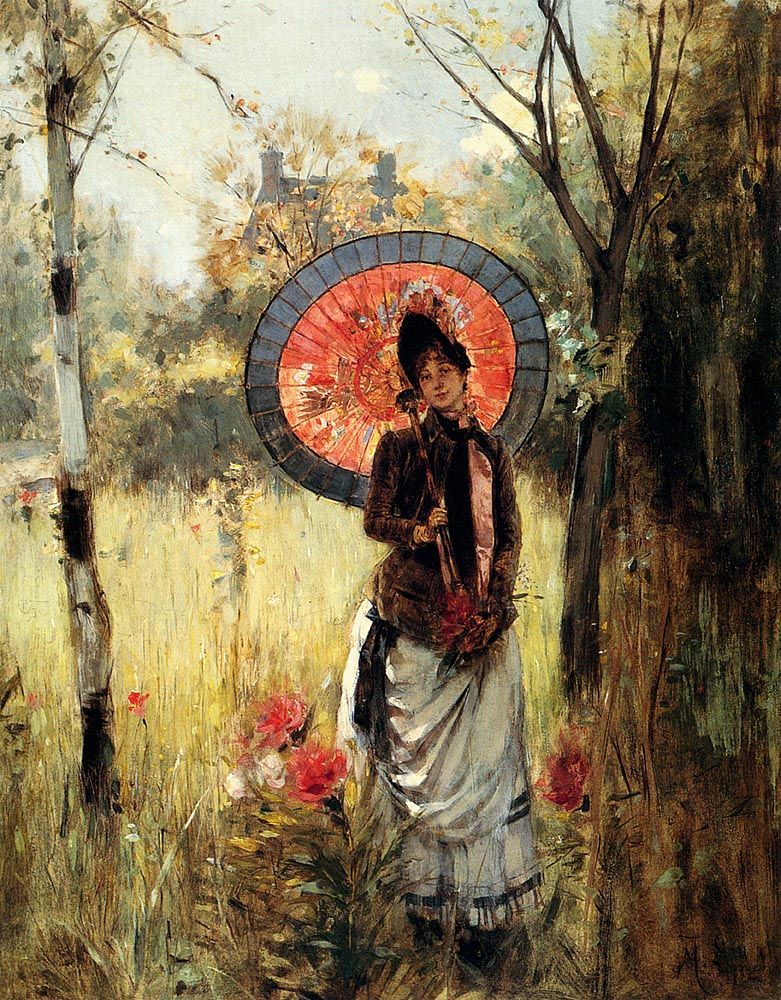
A Summer Stroll

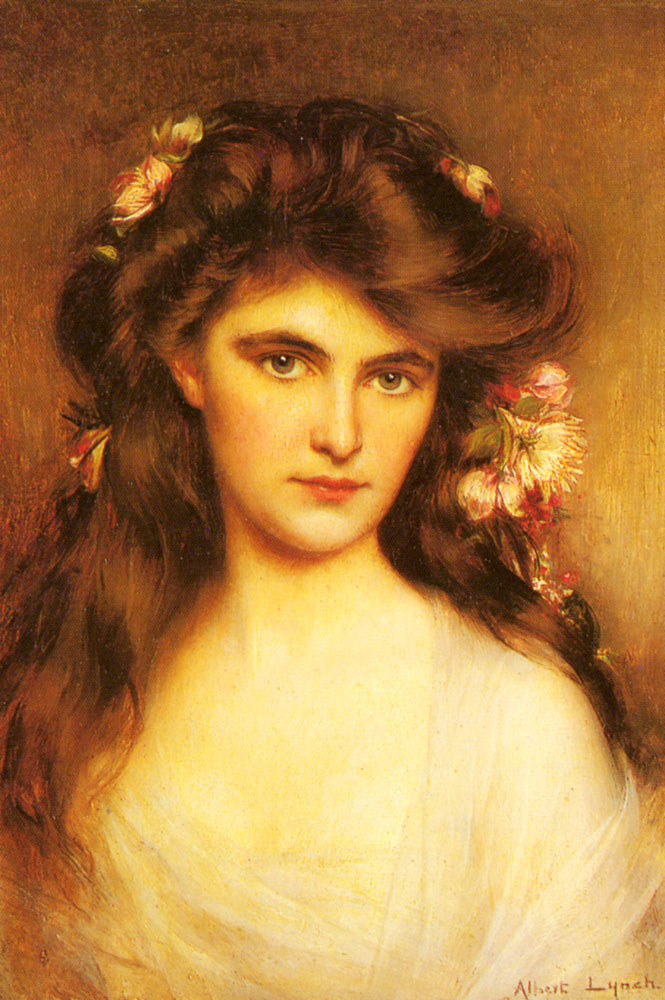
A Young Beauty With Flowers In Her Hair

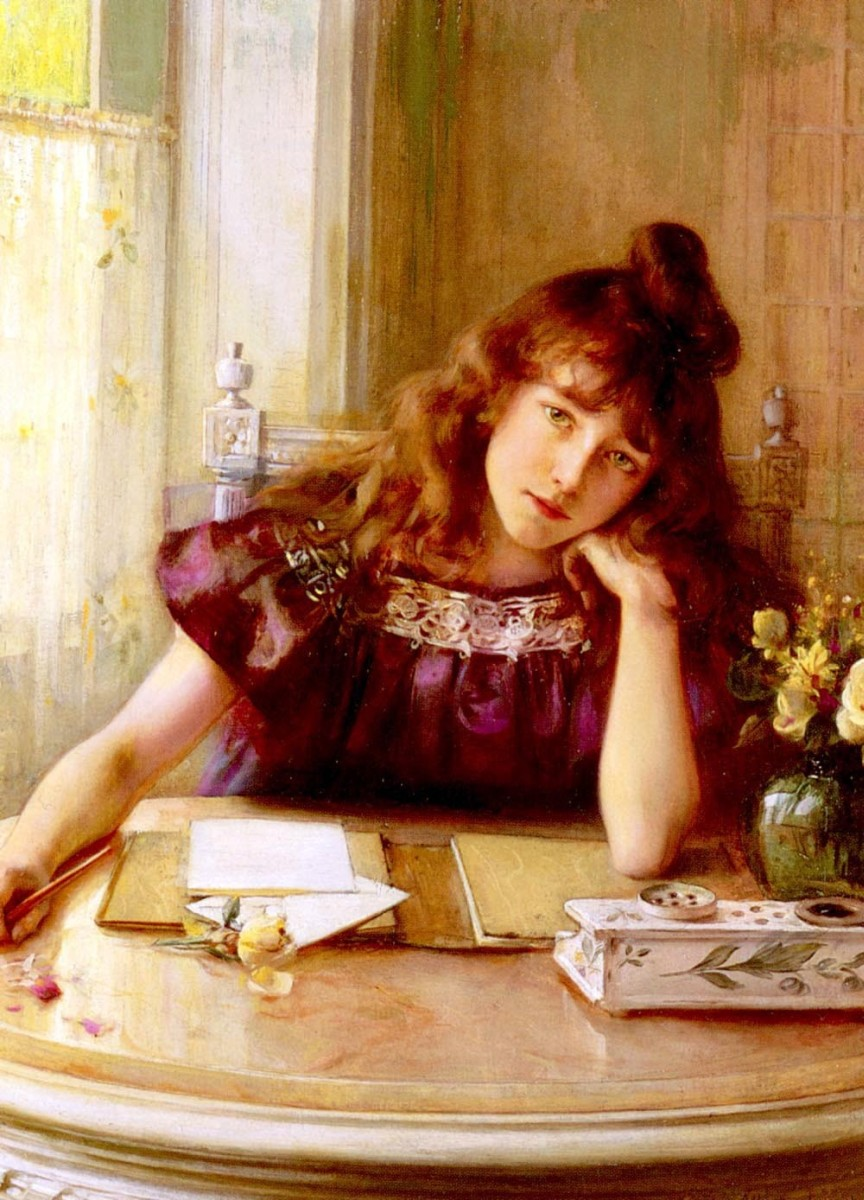
The Letter

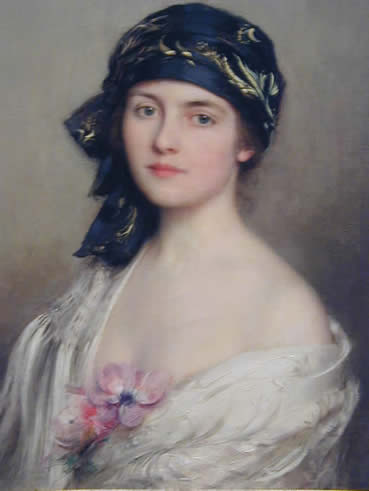
Woman with Black Turban

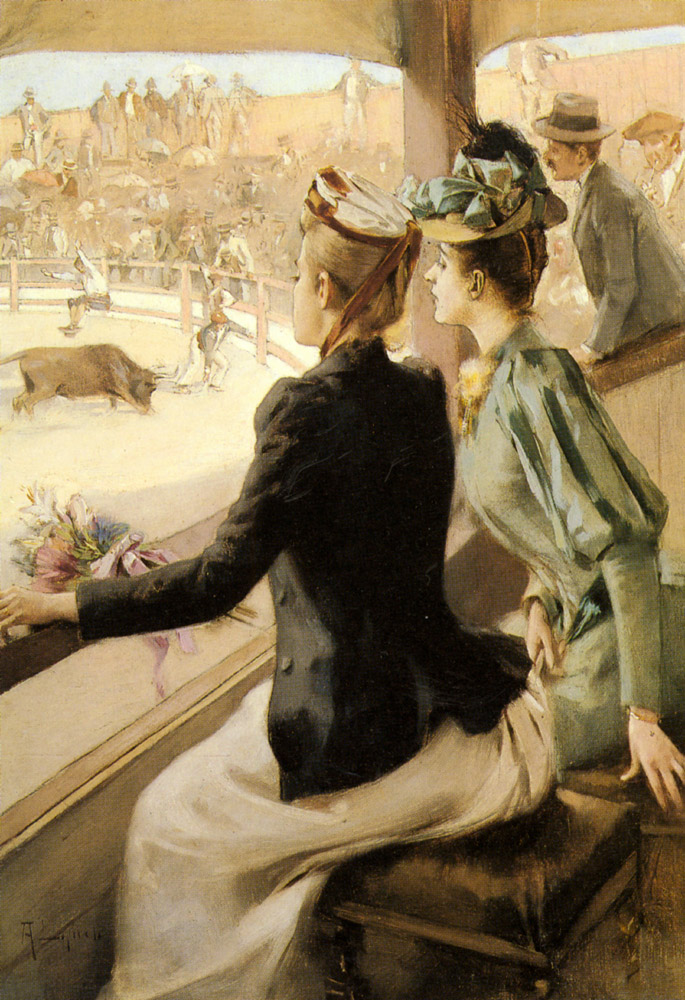
At The Bullfight

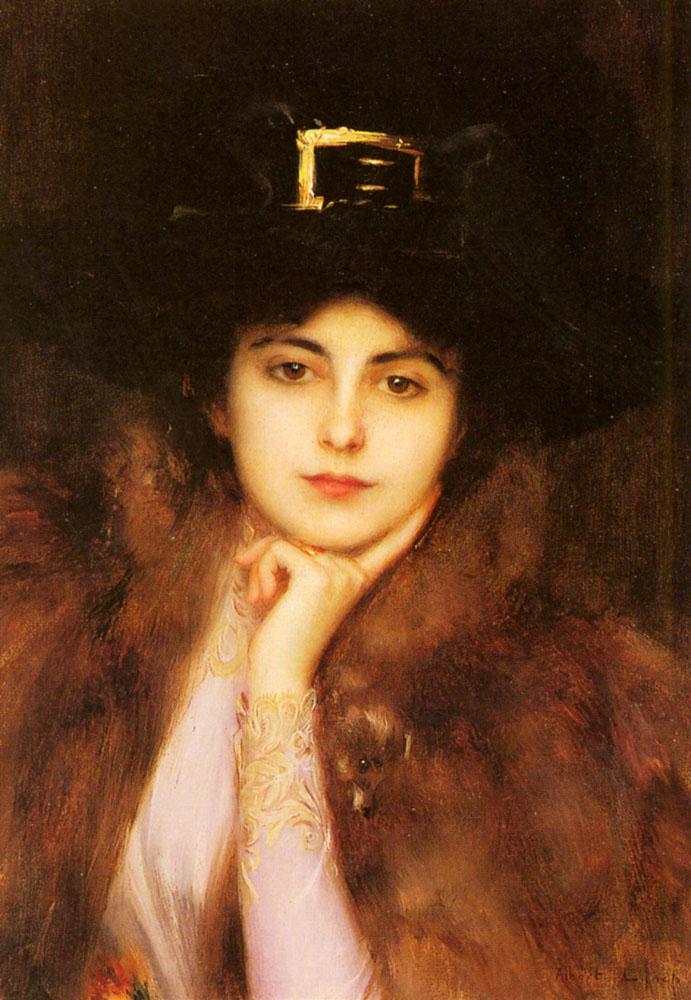
Portrait Of An Elegant Lady

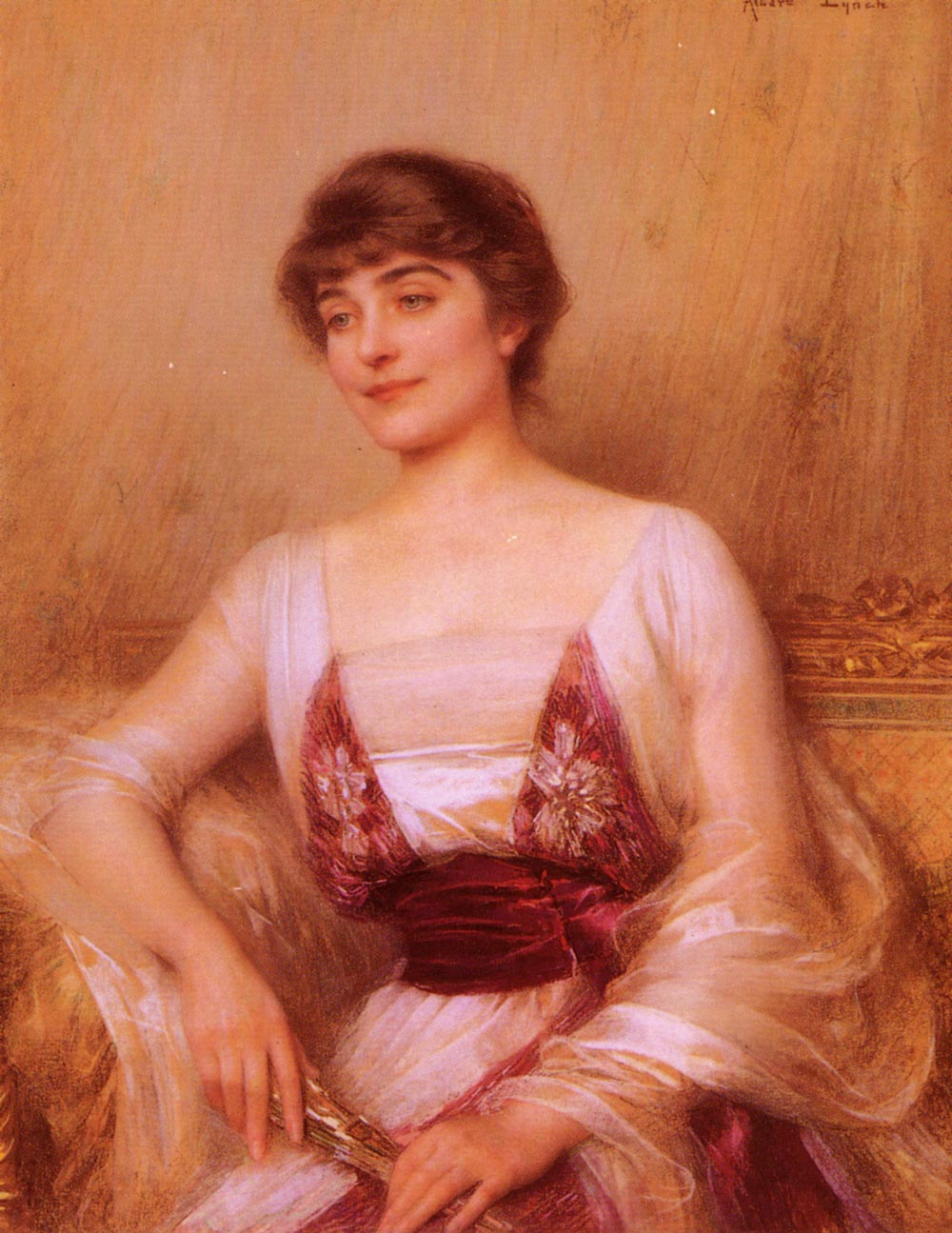
A Lady With A Fan

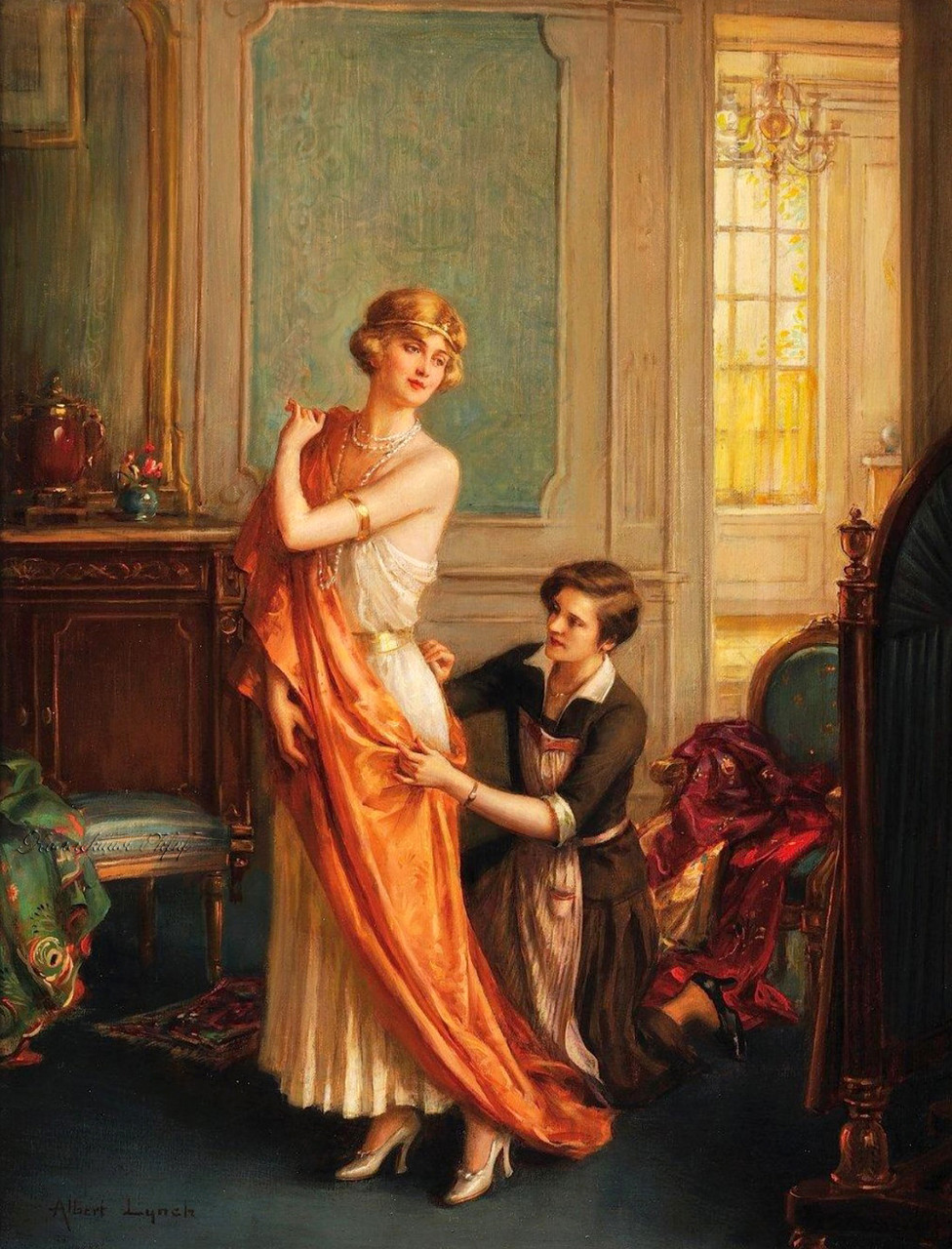
An Elegant Lady Being Dressed

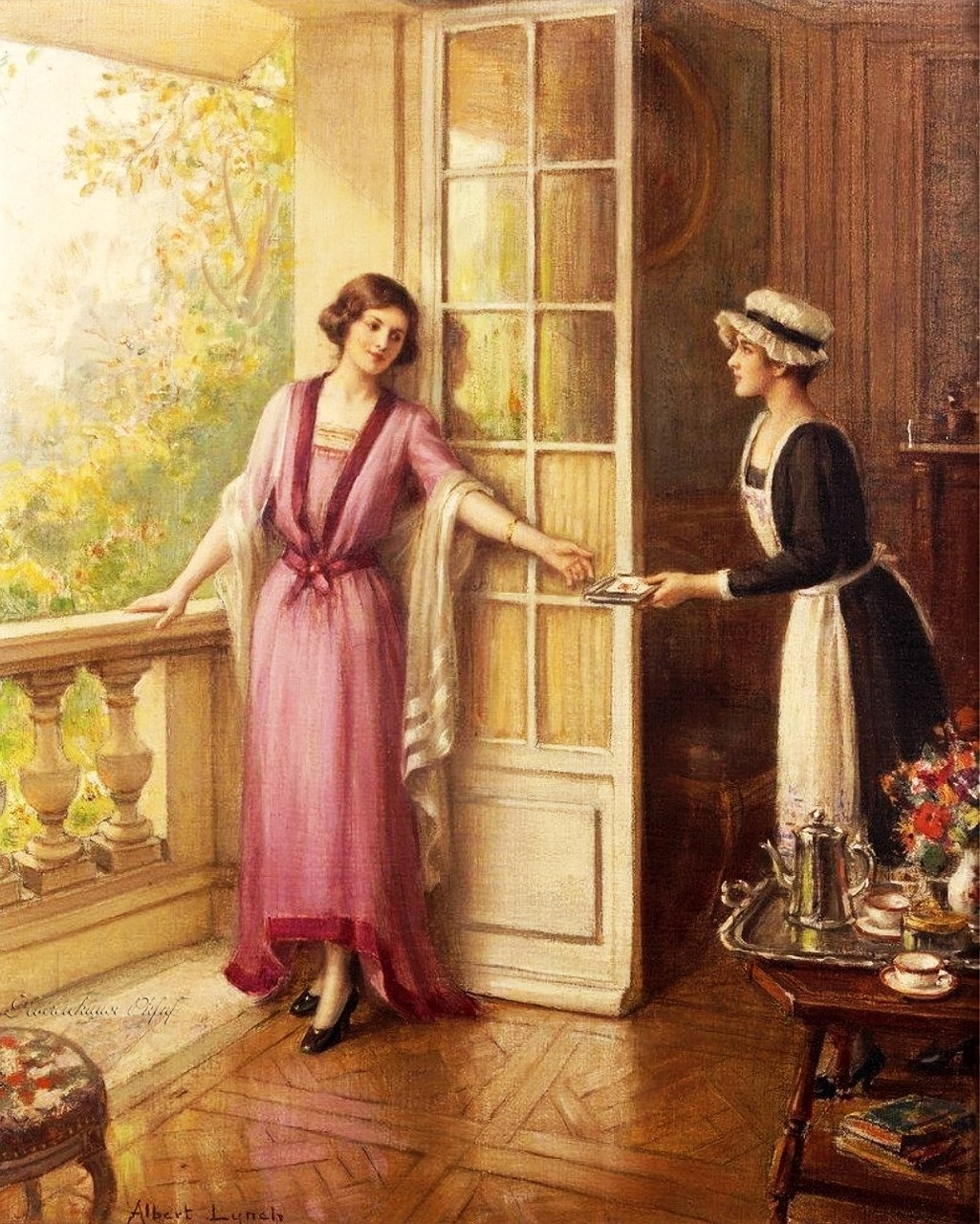
A Lady and Her Chambermaid

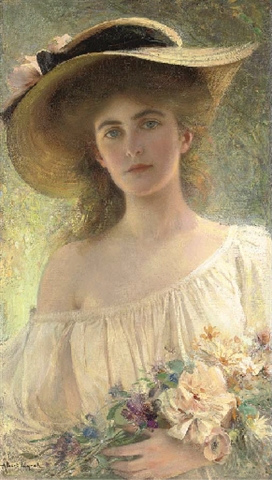
Soleil éternel
