= Jules Noël =

Jules Noël is the name of

- Jules Noël (athlete) (1903–1940), French discus thrower and shot putter
- Jules Achille Noël (1815–1881), French landscape and maritime painter
