= Albert Maignan =

French painter (1845–1908)

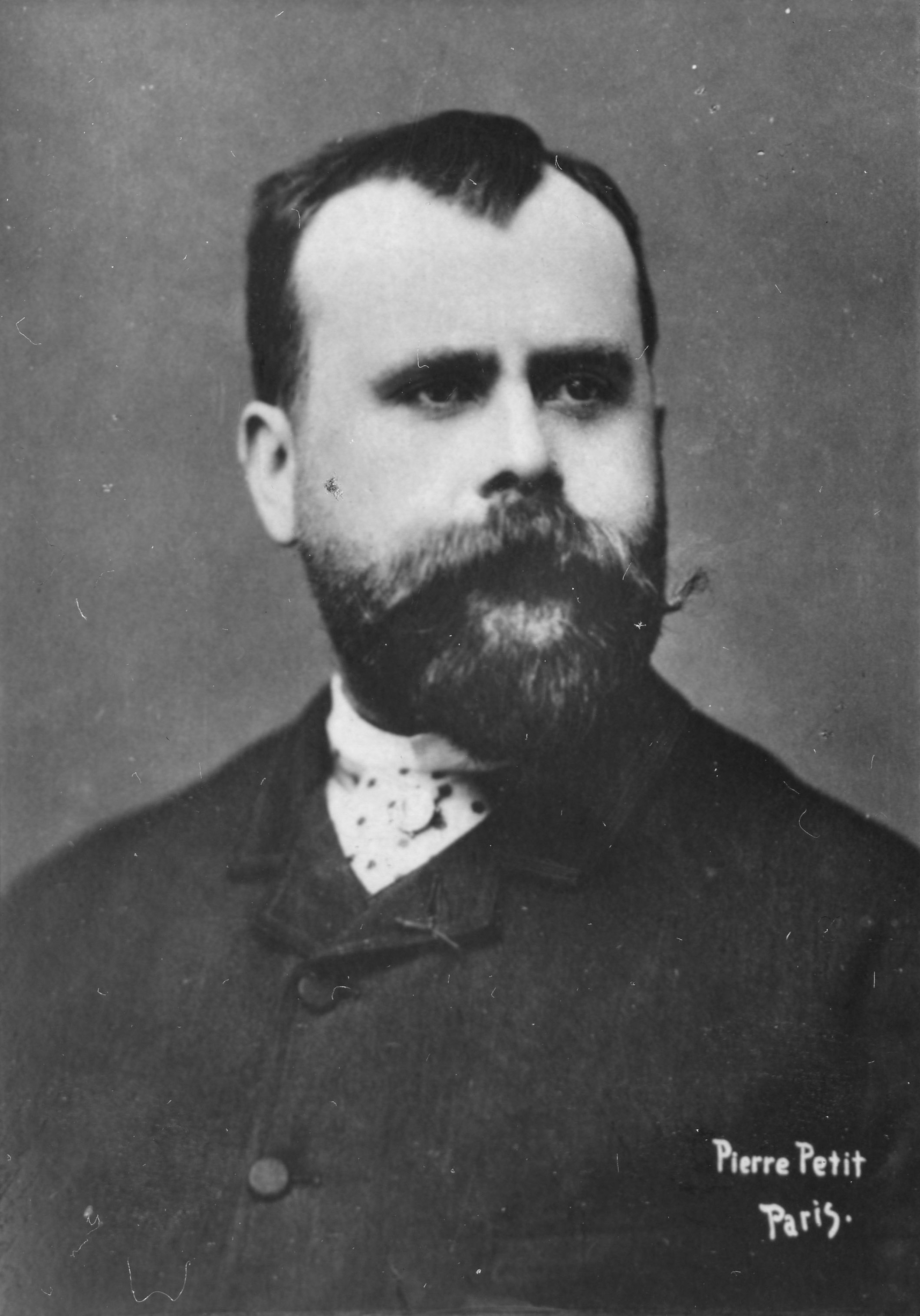
- Albert Maignan (1845–1908) by Pierre Petit.
- Born: 14 October 1845; Beaumont-sur-Sarthe, France
- Died: 29 September 1908 (aged 62); Saint-Prix, France
- Education: Under Jules Noël, Évariste Vital Luminais
- Notable work: Homage to Clovis II, Louis IX consoling a leper
- Awards: Médaille d'or in 1889, Légion d'honneur in 1895.

Albert Pierre René Maignan (14 October 1845 – 29 September 1908) was a French history painter and illustrator.

== Biography ==
In 1864, he left his hometown to study law in Paris, earning his diploma in 1866. During his studies he also painted and took art lessons from Jules Achille Noël. He had his début at the Salon of 1867, and continued to exhibit there throughout his life. In 1868, he travelled extensively, painting in Rouen, Córdoba, Seville and at the Suez Canal before its opening. Upon his return, he found a position in the studios of Évariste Vital Luminais.

In 1889, he won a gold medal at the Exposition Universelle and received the Medal of Honor at the Salon in 1892. Three years later, he was named a Knight in the Légion d'honneur.

Most of his work is devoted to history painting, although he also produced many portraits. His Spanish and Orientalist paintings show the influence of Henri Regnault. After 1889, he also drew illustrations and painted decorative murals, including some at the Salon des Lettres at the Hôtel de Ville and the Chamber of Commerce and Industry in Saint-Étienne. Branching out, from 1895 to 1899 he created a series of tapestries for the Salle des Conférences at the Palais du Luxembourg.

He was also part of a group of painters who decorated the foyer at the Opéra-Comique and was one of several who were given commissions to decorate "Le Train Bleu", a famous restaurant in the Gare de Lyon, in 1900.

== Gallery ==
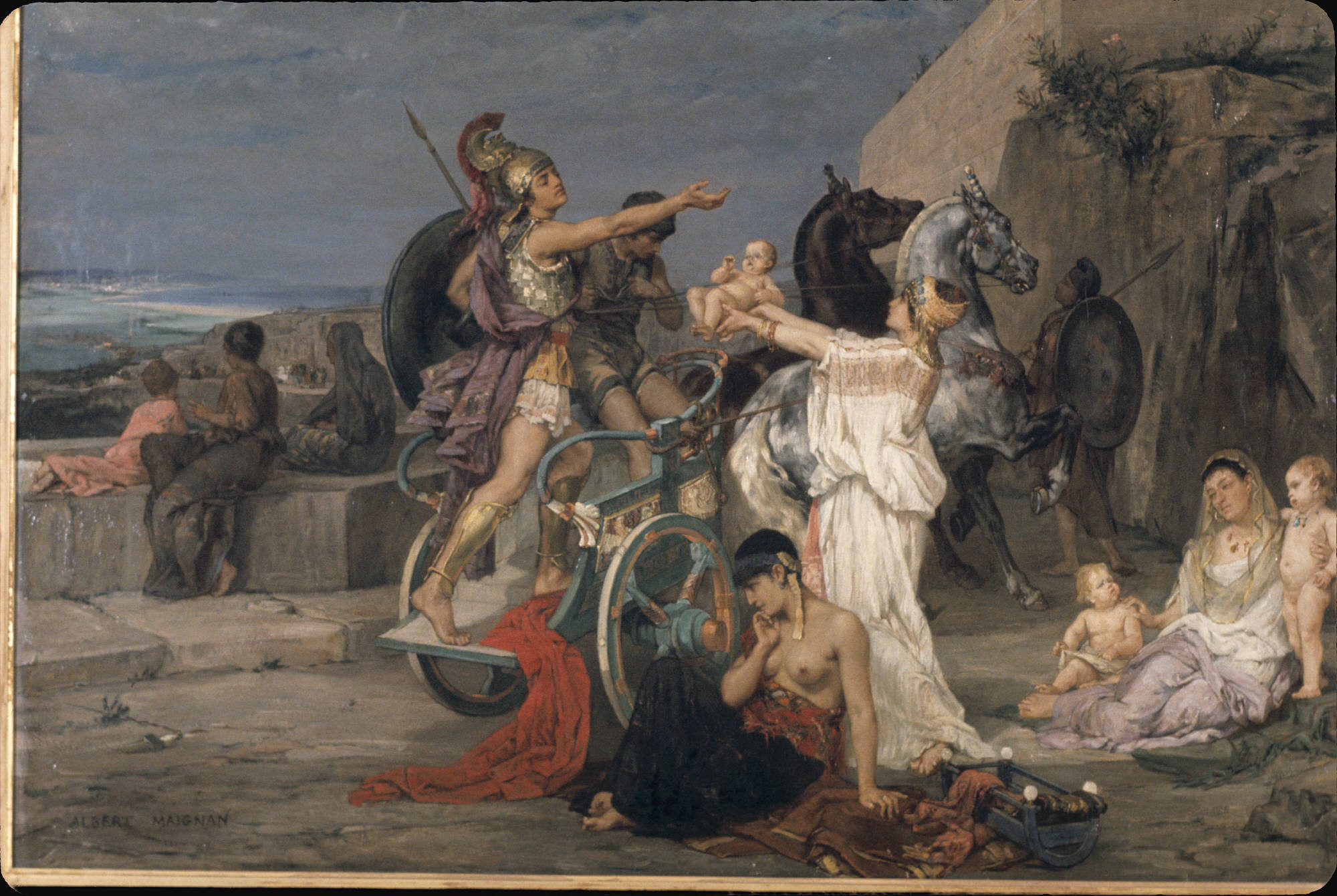
The Departure of Hektor (Princeton University Art Museum)

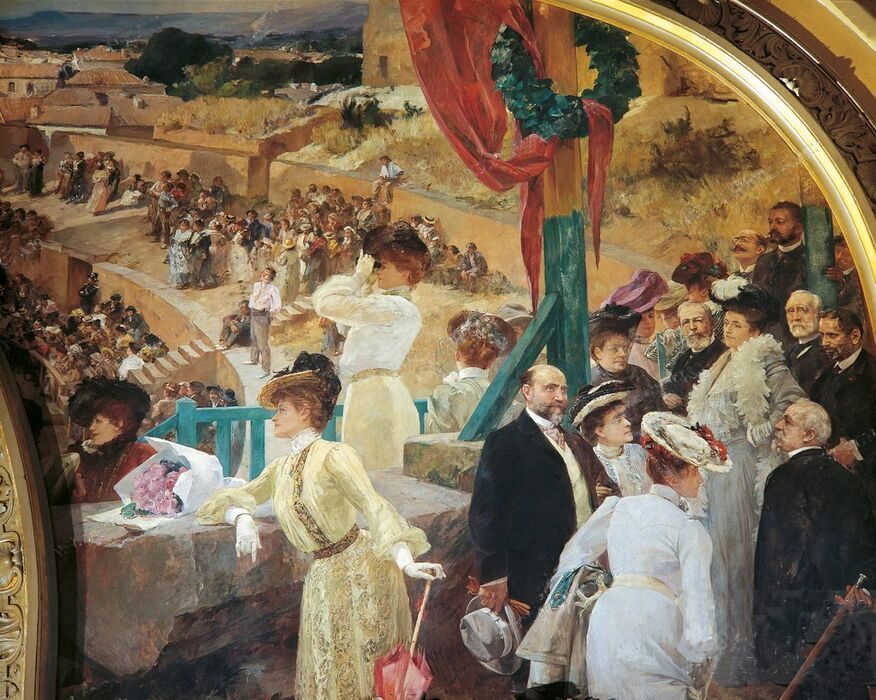
Fresco at Le Train Bleu

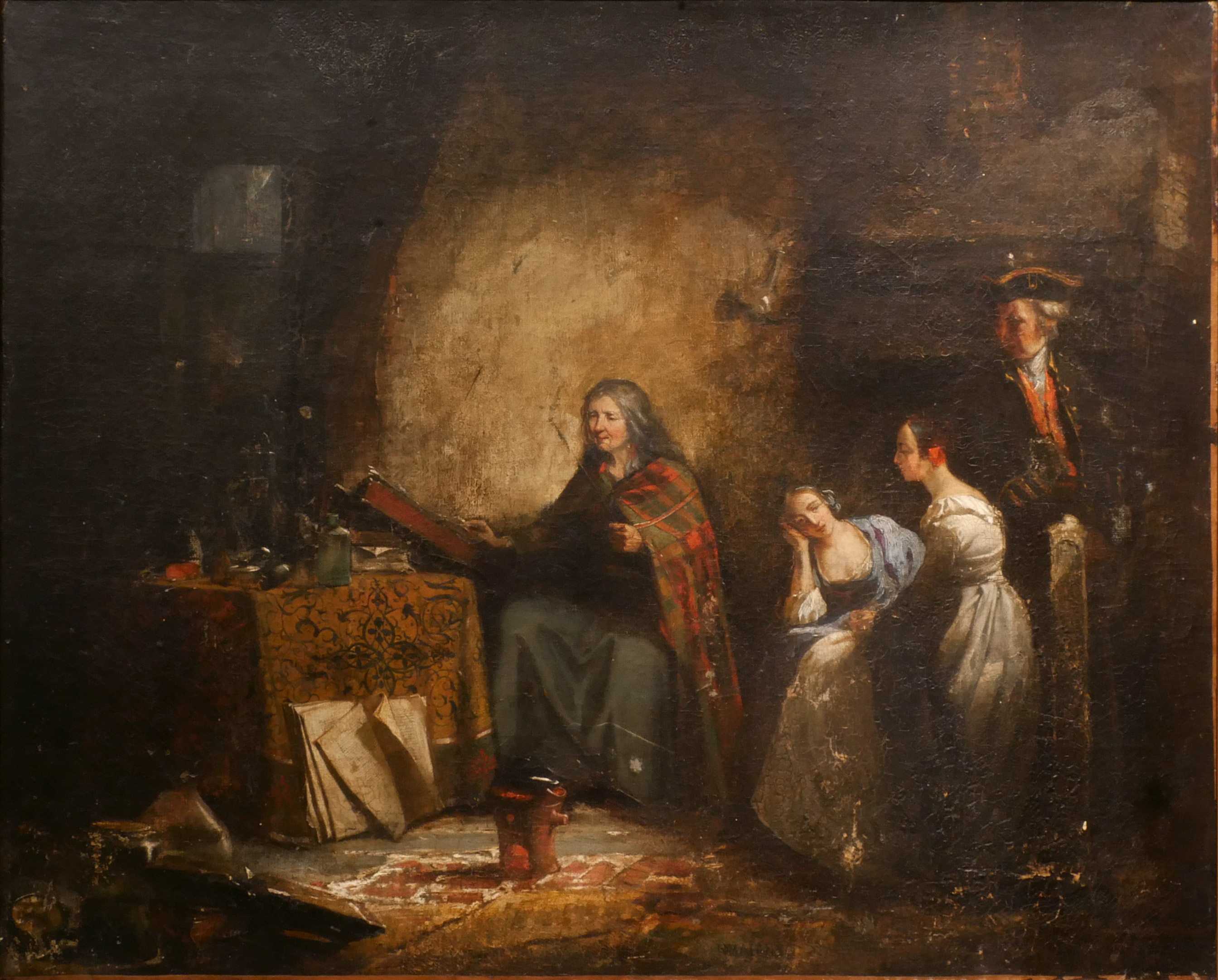
Fortune Teller

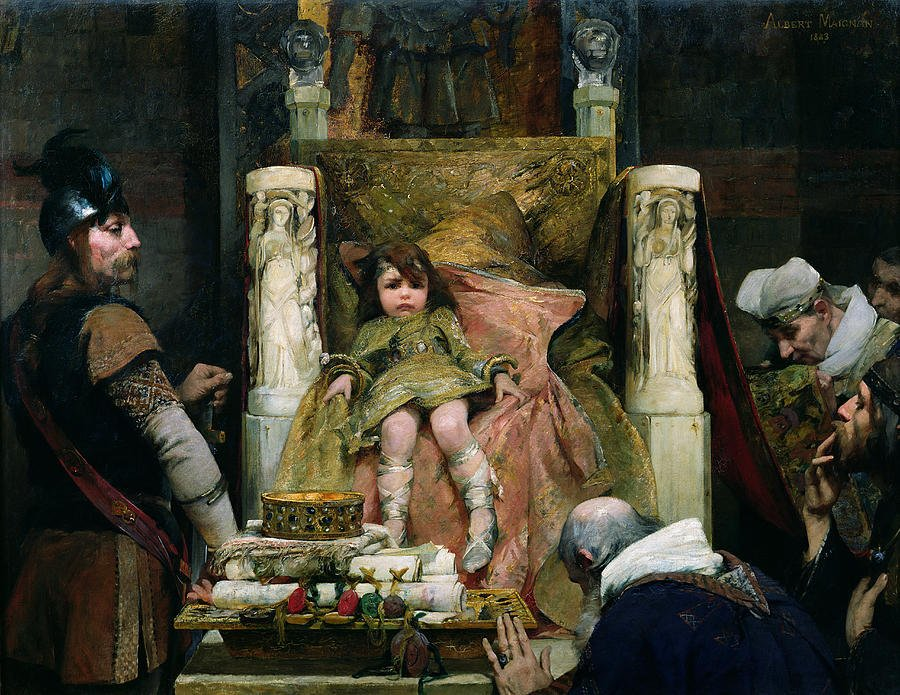
Homage to Clovis II

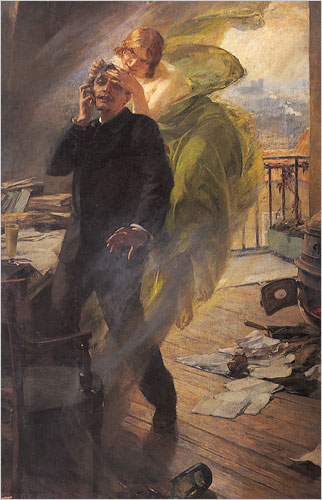
Green Muse (depicting a poet being overcome
by absinthe)

Poster for Jules Massenet's opera Ariane (1906)

== See also ==
- Georges Girardot
