= Frank Stephens (sculptor) =

American sculptor and activists (1859–1935)

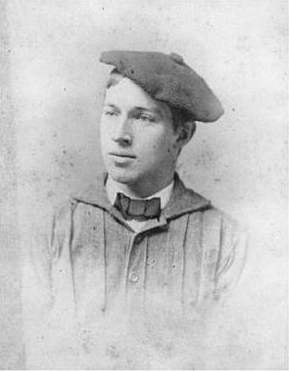
- Born: George Francis Stephens; December 28, 1859; Rahway, New Jersey
- Died: June 16, 1935 (aged 75); Gilpin Point, Maryland
- Known for: Community planning
- Notable work: Arden, Delaware
- Movement: Georgism, Arts and Crafts Movement

George Francis Stephens (23 December 1859 – 16 June 1935) was an American sculptor, political activist, and co-founder of the utopian single-tax community in Arden, Delaware.

== Early life, education and family ==
He was born December 28, 1859, in Rahway, New Jersey, to Henry Louis Stephens and Charlotte Ann Wevil. Stephens briefly attended Rutgers College in New Brunswick, New Jersey, before entering the Pennsylvania Academy of the Fine Arts (PAFA) in 1875. There he studied under Thomas Eakins at various times between 1879 and 1885.

Stephens served as Eakins' teaching assistant beginning in 1880, and married Eakins' sister Caroline "Caddie" Eakins on June 14, 1884. They had three children, Margaret, Donald, and Roger. Caroline died of typhoid fever in 1889, soon after giving birth to their third child.

Stephens' second marriage was to Elenor Getty on November 29, 1905; they had ten children.

== Art career ==
Following art school, Stephens formed a Philadelphia decorative arts business with classmates Colin Campbell Cooper, Jr., Jesse Godley, and Walter J. Cunningham. He worked as a carver on the sculpture program of Philadelphia City Hall for several years, and was an instructor in modeling at several art schools, including the Drexel Institute. He was a member of the Philadelphia Sketch Club from 1881 until his death in 1935.

Stephens exhibited semi-regularly at the annual exhibitions of the Pennsylvania Academy of the Fine Arts from 1879 to 1889, and in 1907 and 1908.

=== Sculptures ===
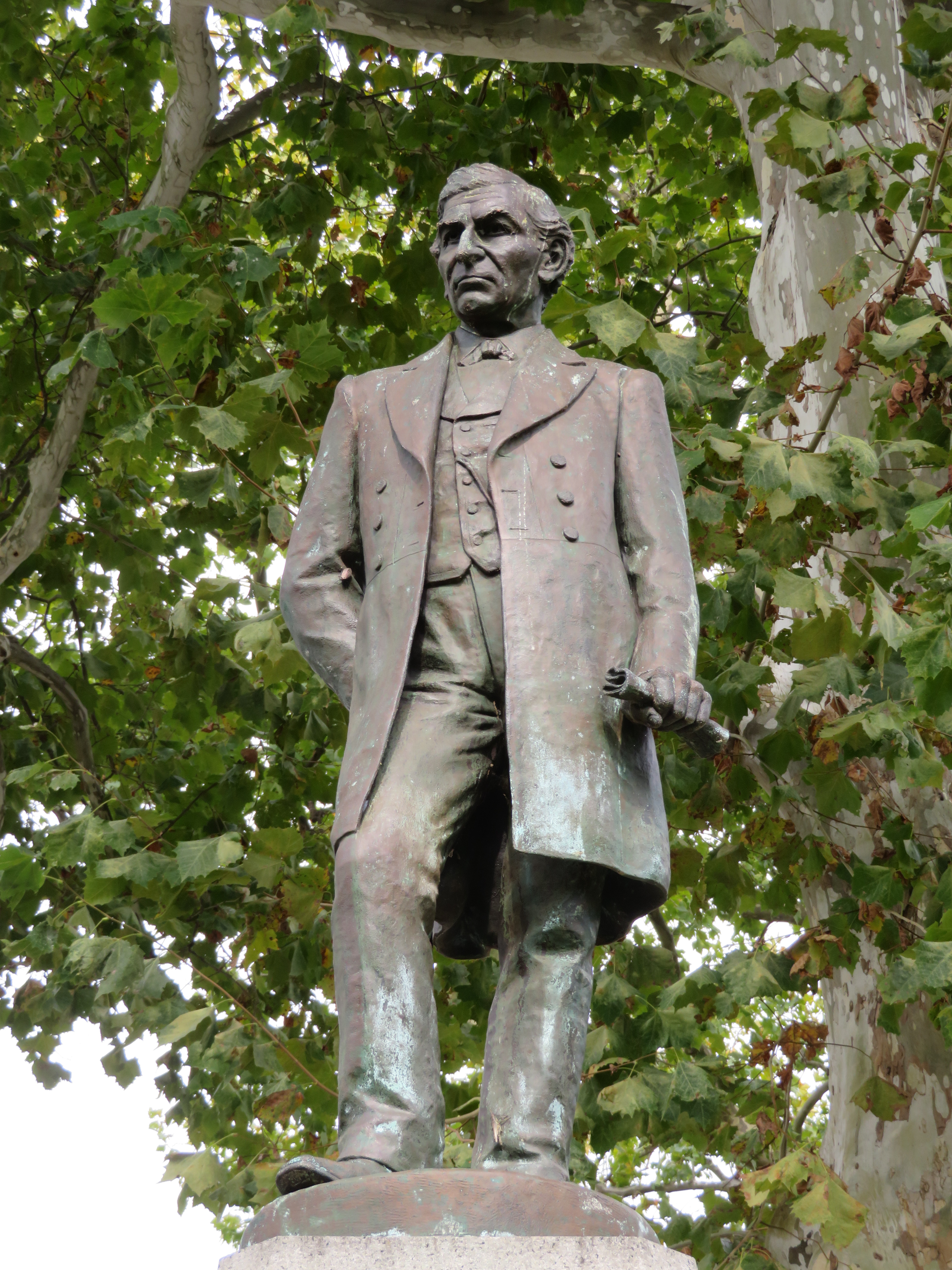
Frederick Lauer (1884), City Park, Reading, PA

- Portrait Bust: John Casani (1882), plaster
- Portrait Bust: Henry L. Stephens (1882), plaster, the artist's father
- Portrait Relief: J. M. Arthur (1883), bronze
- Portrait Bust: Thomas F. Brady (1884)
- Frederick Lauer Monument (1884), bronze, City Park, Reading, PA
- Portrait Bust: Mrs. George F. Stephens (1885), the artist's wife, "Caddie" Eakins
- Statue of William Penn (1889), medium?, The Penn Mutual Life Insurance Company, Philadelphia
- Portrait Bust: Dr. William G. A. Bonwill (1889)
- Portrait of Master Denzil Bush (1907), medium?
- Figure: Will Price Playing a Cello (year?), bronze

==== Possible work ====
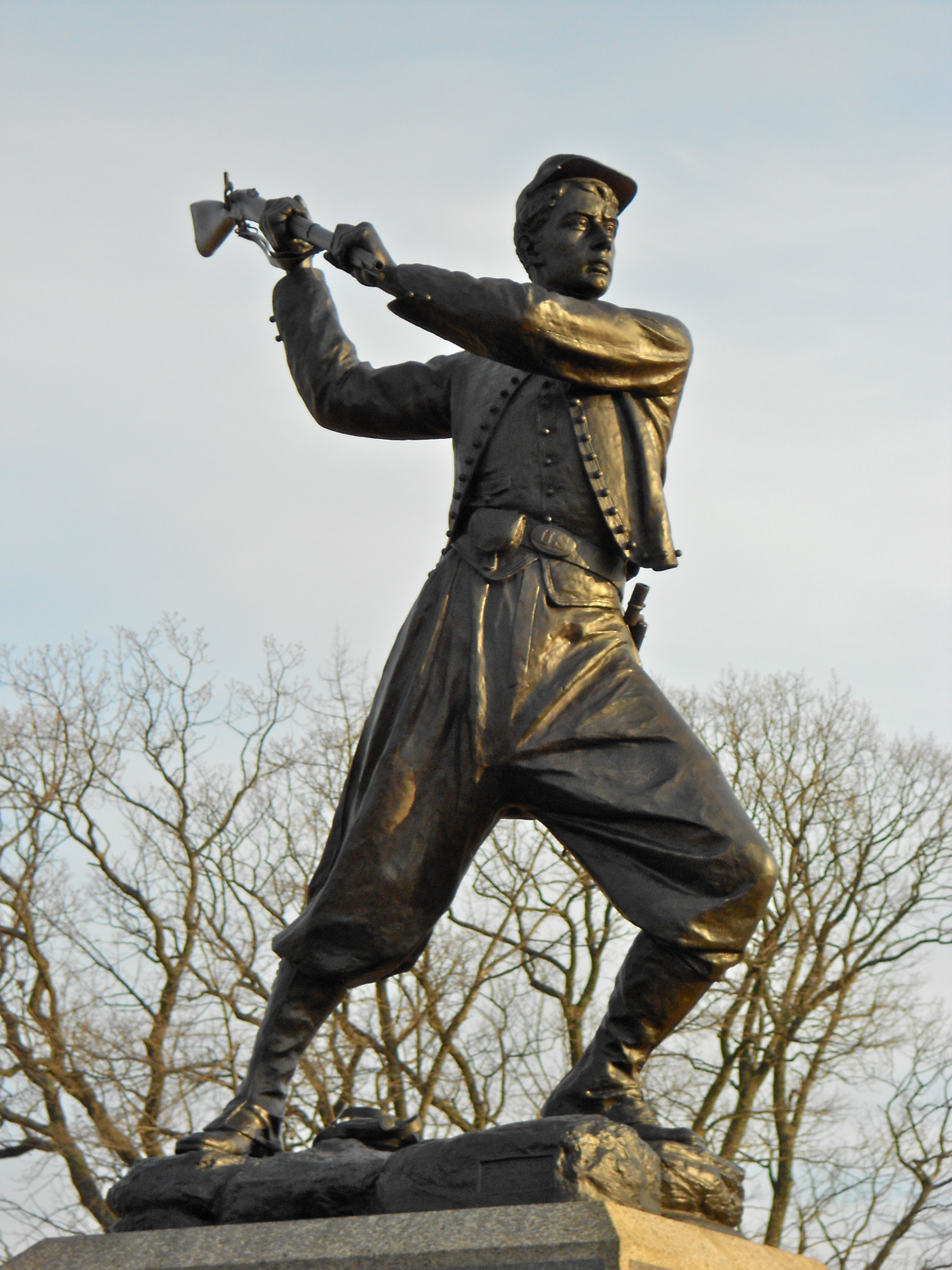
Fire Zouave (1888), 72nd Pennsylvania Infantry Monument, Gettysburg Battlefield

Stephens may have created the famous Fire Zouave figure on the Gettysburg Battlefield, who wields his rifle as a club:

[A]t the Bloody Angle, stands today the Zouave, in bronze, typifying, with clubbed musket, the heroic hand-to-hand battle the regiment made on July 3d, 1863. ... Upon the morning of that eventful day the Fire Zouaves numbered four hundred and fifty-eight officers and men. After the fury of the conflict was past there were but two hundred and sixty-six of the 72d left for further duty.

Inscribed "Stephens 1888", the bronze sculpture was cast by Bureau Brothers in Philadelphia, but records do not list the sculptor's first name. Following its rejection by the Gettysburg Battlefield Memorial Association, this second 72nd Pennsylvania Infantry Monument was erected on private battlefield land and dedicated July 4, 1891.

=== Accusations against Eakins ===
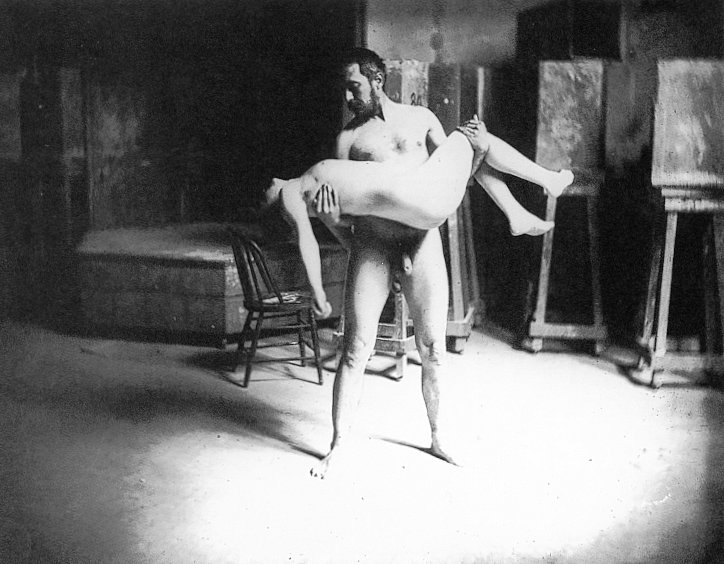
"Thomas Eakins nude, holding a nude female in his arms, looking down." (c.1885). Bregler cat. no. 348. This photograph was taken in the studios at PAFA.

On February 9, 1886, Stephens accused his brother-in-law, Thomas Eakins, of sexual misconduct with female PAFA students, and with having engaged in incest with Margaret Eakins (1853-1882), his deceased sister. The charges ignited such a controversy that Eakins was forced to resign from PAFA.

Frank Stephens, his cousin Charles Stephens, and Thomas Anshutz, all PAFA instructors, took their accusations to the Philadelphia Sketch Club: "We hereby charge Mr. Thom^{s} Eakins with conduct unworthy of a gentleman & discreditable to this organization & ask his expulsion from the club." A committee investigated, and concluded: "Eakins has used his position as an artist and his authority as a teacher to commit certain trespasses on common decency and good morals." His honorary membership in the club was revoked.

The charges of sexual misconduct and incest were never proven, but Eakins's personal reputation was ruined, something from which he never totally recovered.

=== Change in career ===
"Caddie" Eakins died of typhus in November 1889, leaving Stephens to care for their three-year-old daughter, two-year-old son, and four-month-old infant son. He abandoned his career as a sculptor, and eventually became a real estate developer and promoter of utopian communities. In a lecture to PAFA students, he stated:

I decided that it wasn't my [sculptural] figures only, but the times [that] were out of joint. No need to detail to you by what unhappiness I came to realize that clay is not my medium, nor sculpture my work—it was tragic, but probably not so much so as those of you who still believe art is your medium of expression, and go on talking in an unknown tongue to an uninterested audience.

== Single-tax movement ==
Stephens was influenced by the theories of Henry George, who argued in his 1879 publication Progress and Poverty for a more equitable distribution of wealth, through a single tax levied on the actual value of land irrespective of improvements a person might make. George platformed on this philosophy in his 1886 New York City mayoral bid, and despite losing was successful enough for a subsequent run. Stephens joined his campaign in 1895.

Stephens first came to Delaware along with William Lightfoot Price, a Philadelphia architect, in 1895-1896 during the single-tax campaign to win political control of the state. The single-taxers hoped that by gaining control of a small political entity they could put their principles into action and prove the legitimacy of Henry George's aims. Although the campaign failed — many activists (including Stephens) were jailed — Price and Stephens did not give up their dream of creating a utopian community.

== Founding Arden, Delaware ==
With the financial help of Joseph Fels, a wealthy soap manufacturer and single-tax proponent, Stephens purchased the Derrickson property, a 162 acres (0.66 km^{2}) farm six miles north of Wilmington on June 12, 1900. Price and Stephens named their newly founded community after the idyllic Forest of Arden from Shakespeare's As You Like It, and adopted "You are welcome hither" (a line from King Lear) as the community motto because they wanted the village to be a place open to people of all economic levels and political views.

Along with their economic philosophy, Price and Stephens shared a belief in the principles of William Morris, John Ruskin, and the Arts and Crafts Movement. Morris, an Englishman, rebelled against modern cities and industry, advocating a return to craft production, good design, and village life. Price designed a town plan that provided communal open space, encouraged people to mingle with their neighbors, and preserved the woodlands along Naaman's Creek.

Stephens continued to live in and lead Arden for three decades following its founding, earning the nickname "Patro" ("Father" in Esperanto) by the villagers. He died June 16, 1935 at age 75 in Gilpin Point, Maryland, another Georgian community he had helped to start.
