= Georges Girardot =

French painter

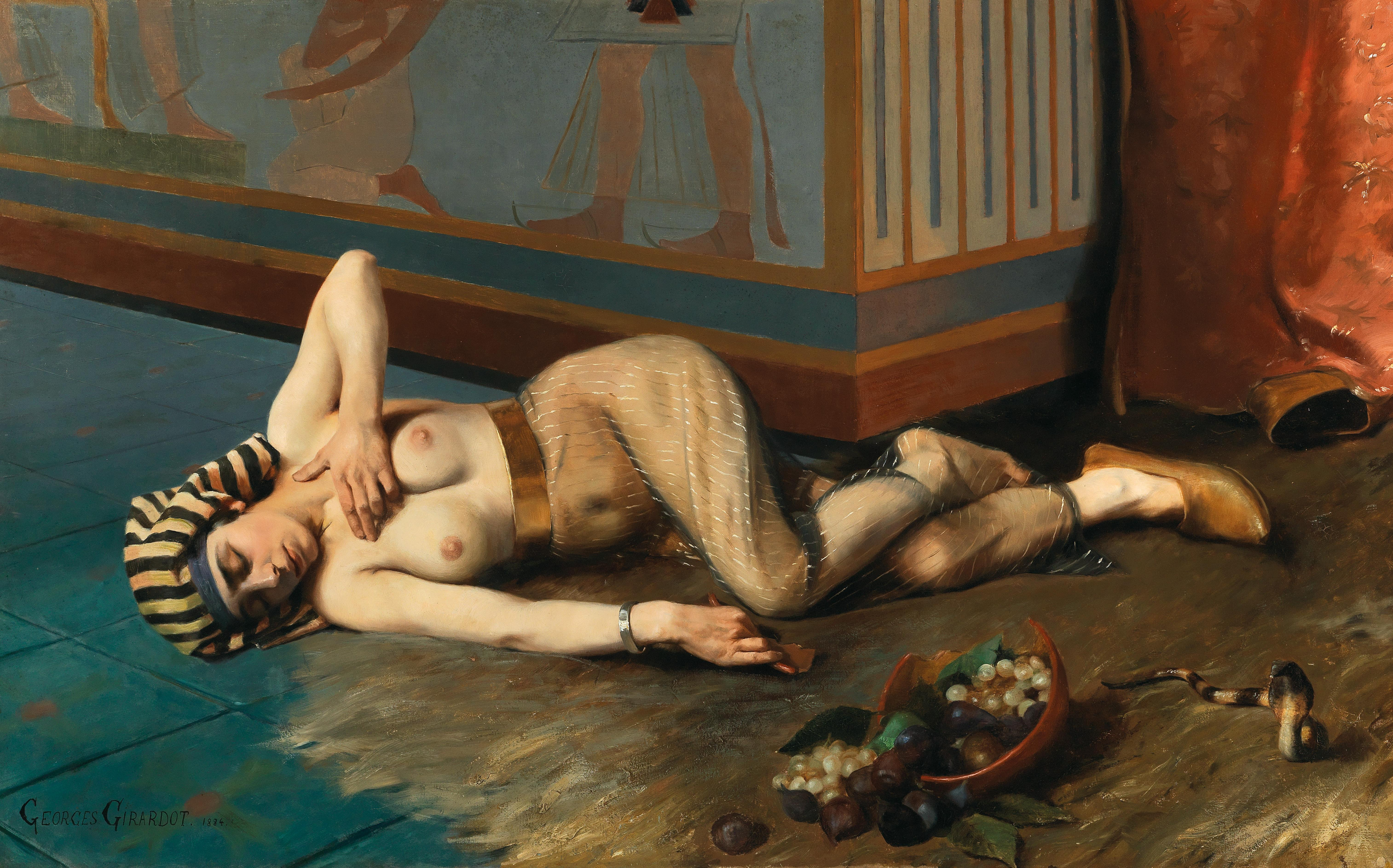
The Death of Cleopatra (1884)

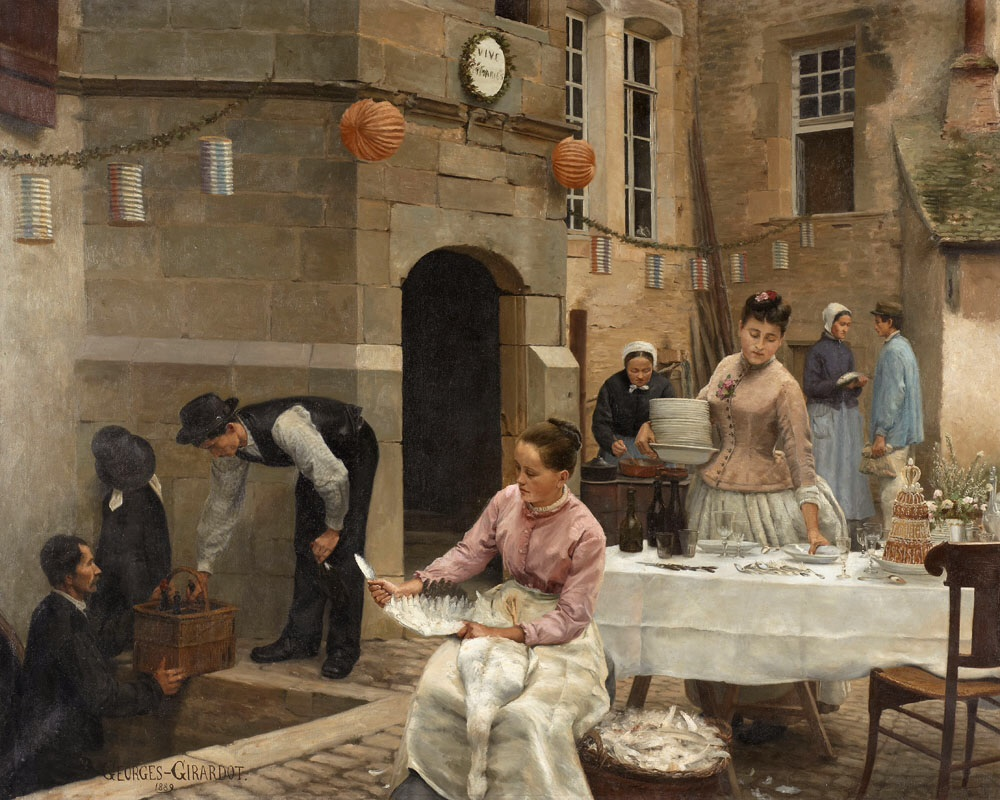
Before the Wedding (1889)

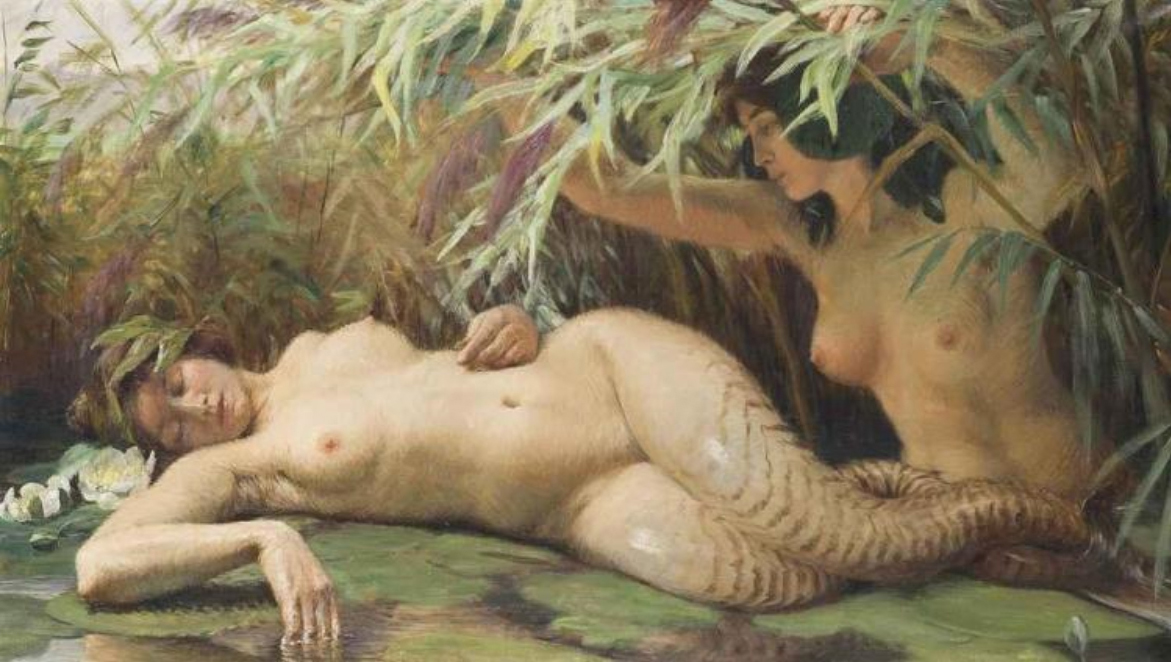
Water Nymphs (n.d.)

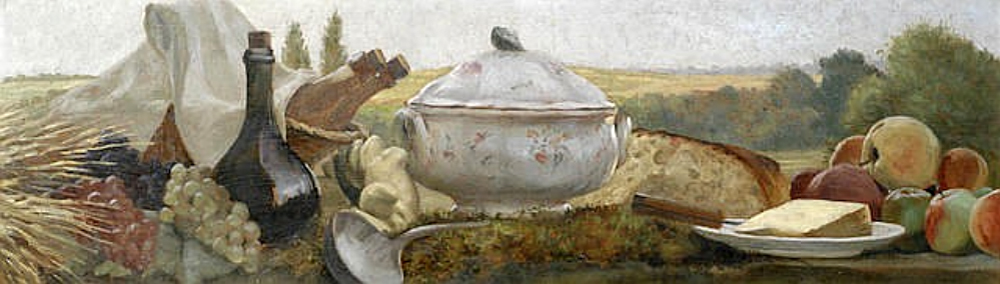
Outdoor Lunch (n.d.)

Georges Marie Julien Girardot (1856–1914) was a French figure, landscape, and marine painter.

== Life ==
Georges Marie Julien Girardot was born in Besançon, Doubs on 4 August 1856. He was trained by the artist Albert Maignan in Paris.

Girardot was active in Paris, painting mostly genre paintings, female nudes, and landscapes. From 1882 he showed his works in the Salon des Artistes Français. He was awarded an honourable mention in 1893 for The Hunt, a third-class medal in 1896 for Sermon and Miracles of St. Maximin, and a second-class medal in 1907 for Les Dieux s'en vont ('The Gods are Leaving'). He was a full member of the Société des Artistes Français from 1883 until his death. From 1907 he was also an associate member of the Académie des sciences, belles-lettres et arts de Besançon et de Franche-Comté.

He died in Paris on 21 April 1914, aged 57.

== Collections ==
- Gray, Musée Baron-Martin: Le gui sacré ('The Sacred Mistletoe').
