= Anna Margaretta Archambault =

American artist and author

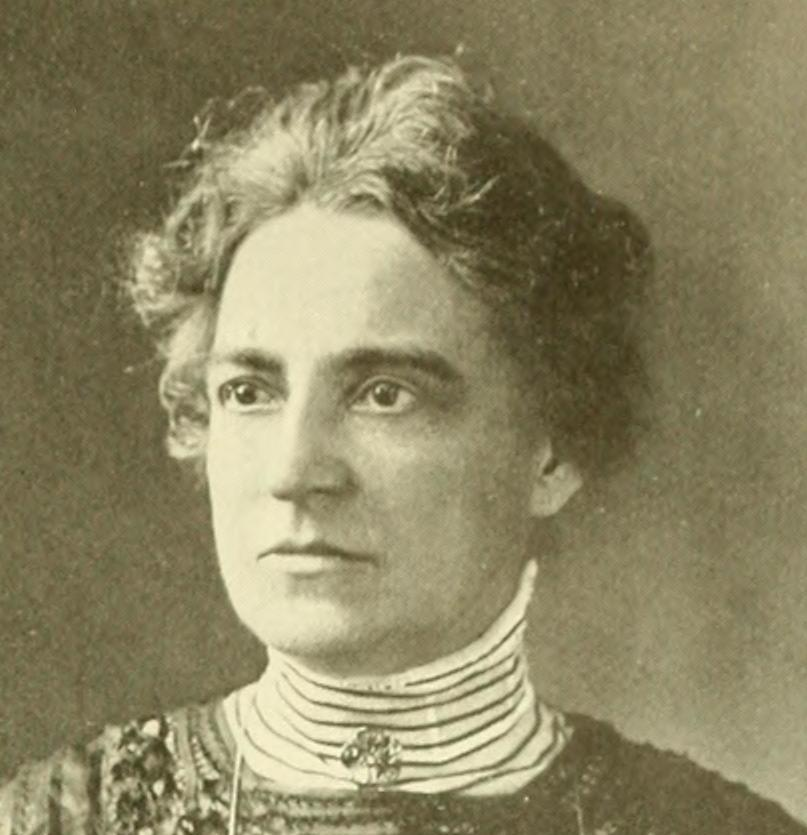
- Archambault circa 1912
- Born: 1856; Philadelphia, Pennsylvania
- Died: 1956 (aged 99–100); Philadelphia, Pennsylvania

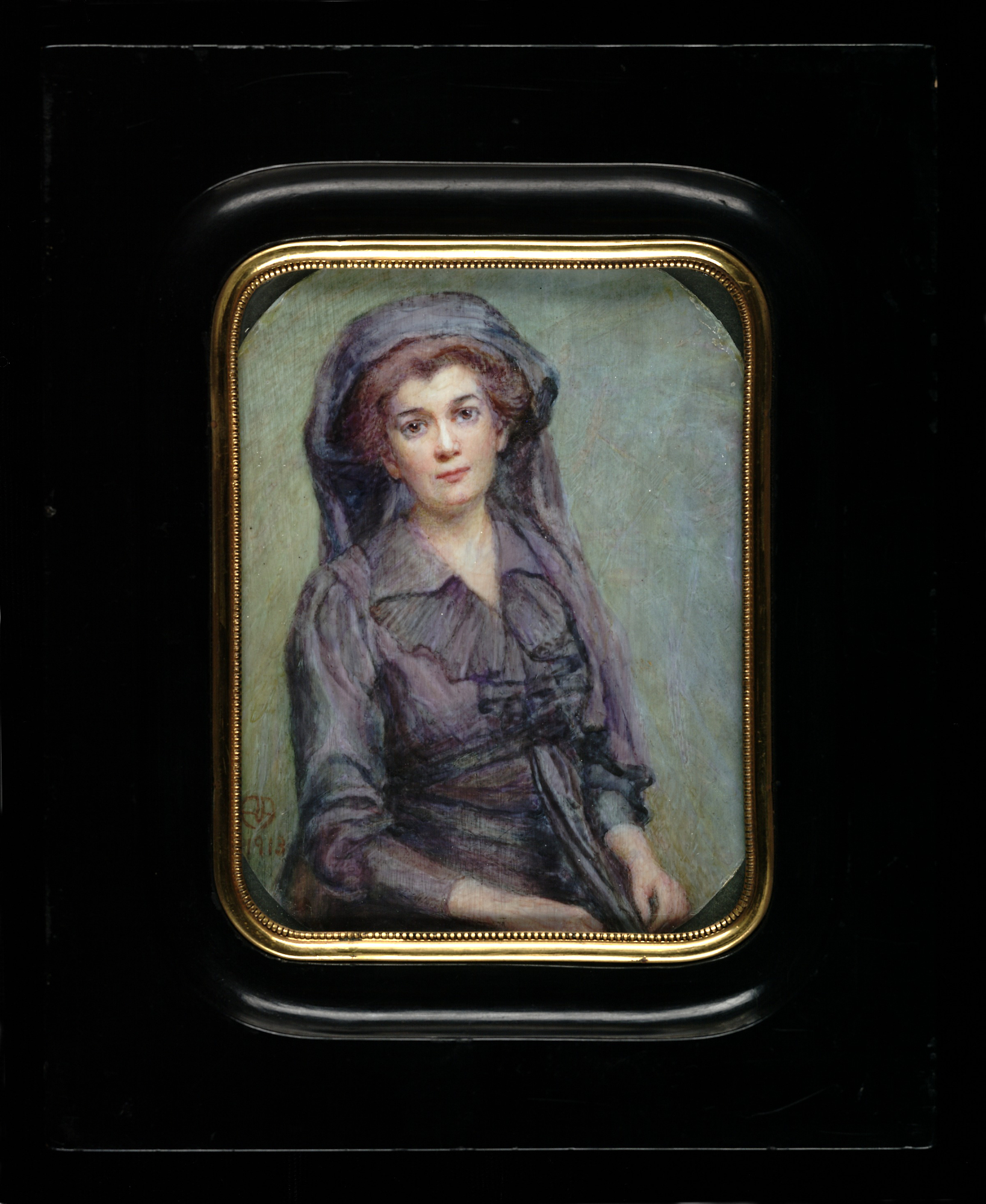
Miss Clementine Dalcour in Mourning, by Anna Margaretta Archambault.

Anna Margaretta Archambault (1856–1956) was an American artist and author. She is best known for her 1924 book A Guide Book of Art, Architecture, and Historic Interests in Pennsylvania, which remains in print as of 2020.

== Life ==
Born in 1856 in Philadelphia, Pennsylvania, she undertook studies at the Miss Anne Longstreth's School for Girls, the Pennsylvania Academy of Fine Arts in Philadelphia and at the Académie Julian in Paris. Thomas Eakins, Thomas Hovenden and Benjamin Constant were her later professors.

Archambault died on June 30, 1956, at Christ Church Hospital in Philadelphia.

== Collections ==
Her miniature portrait paintings are included in the collections of the Smithsonian American Art Museum, the Philadelphia Museum of Art and the Pennsylvania Academy of the Fine Arts.

Her personal papers are included in the Smithsonian's Archives of American Art and in the collection of the Historical Society of Pennsylvania.
