= United States Brewers' Association =

The United States Brewers' Association was a trade organization that existed from 1862 to 1986.

== Founding ==
The impetus for its founding was provided by the institution of federal taxation during the American Civil War. A group of New York brewers, all German immigrants, gathered in New York City in Pythagoras Hall on August 21, 1862, three weeks after the new tax legislation became effective; representatives from thirty-seven breweries attended. After a few more informal meetings, they called for a national meeting on November 12, at which time Frederick Lauer of Pennsylvania was elected president and a committee was appointed to lobby for modification of the tax legislation.

== Growth ==
In 1863, American-born members were added, and the organization reached out to ale brewers to coordinate efforts. The focus was on taxation; the issues of competition, price, and temperance were not considered as important. The group's first victory, in 1863, was convincing the government to refund a tax on lager. It wasn’t until the fourth convention, in October 1864, that the name United States Brewers' Association was adopted: the previous name was the Lager-Beer Brewers Association.

In 1865 it created a commission to travel to Europe to "obtain full and accurate information of the Excise Laws of Europe appertaining to malt liquors"; the findings of the commission enabled the brewers to help determine U.S. taxation policy by showing that low rates of taxation encouraged consumption and brought in more revenue. The USBA got along well with top officials of the Bureau of Internal Revenue, who often attended its conventions, and saw its relationship with the government as one of reciprocal duties and obligations. The approach was effective; between 1864 and 1898 the tax on malt beverages remained constant while that on distilled liquors was raised three times.

== Temperance challenge ==
At its 1867 convention in Chicago, the USBA passed a resolution to challenge the emerging Prohibition Party and its advocates. The resolution stated: “we will use all means to stay the progress of this fanatical party, and to secure our individual rights as citizens, and that we will sustain no candidate, of whatever party, in any election, who is any way disposed towards the total abstinence cause.”

== Popularity ==
In 1898, to help fund the Spanish–American War, Congress finally raised the tax on beer by $1 a barrel; once again, a lobbying campaign was successful, and in 1902 the increase was abolished. The brewers were optimistic that beer was becoming the national drink and that "morality follows in the wake of malt liquors." The brewers supported the Pure Food and Drug Act of 1906, and at the 1908 Convention, USBA president Julius Liebmann praised the merits of beer as compared to other drinks: "...of all alcoholic beverages beer is the mildest, averaging only about three and one-half per cent of alcohol."

== Twentieth century ==
However, the forces of Prohibition had won a significant victory in 1901 when the sale of alcohol was banned on army bases, and they set their sights on a national ban. One element in their favor was the imposition of a national income tax according to the Sixteenth Amendment of 1913, which decreased government reliance on excise taxes for funding; in the same year, the passage of the Webb–Kenyon Act banning the transportation of alcohol into dry states added to the impetus of Prohibition.

During World War I, the income tax replaced liquor taxes as the primary source of federal revenue, and new legislation controlled the use of grains for alcohol. The USBA concentrated on lightening curbs on barley use, avoiding cooperation with the distilled-liquor industry, which it saw as its rival and the main cause of the Prohibition movement. The 56th convention was in Cleveland on November 18, 1916, under the presidency of Gustave Pabst. Within the year the U.S. Congress had adopted the resolution for the Eighteenth Amendment, and Prohibition took effect nationwide in 1920; the 57th convention was not until September 27, 1933, in Chicago.

=== Prohibition ===
During the early years of Prohibition, the USBA was headed by Christian W. Feigenspan.

After his resignation in 1925 (in protest against negotiations with the Anti-Saloon League), Jacob Ruppert became president, succeeded in 1941 by Rudy Schaefer (owner of Schaefer Beer) and then by Herbert J. Charles, under whose presidency, in 1944, the USBA merged with the United Brewers Industrial Foundation to create the United States Brewers Foundation. Later presidents were Edward V. Lahey, Norman Klug and Henry King; the last was Donald Shea.

=== Reorganization ===
In 1986, the Board of the USBA voted to re-organize the trade association, and re-incorporated with a new board and membership structure that welcomed beer importers and supply-chain industries, such as barley- and hops-growers, as well as bottle- and can-manufacturers. The new organization is called The Beer Institute, and continues to represent the American brewing and beer importing industry today from offices in Washington, D.C. The most recent Chairman of the Beer Institute was Tom Long, CEO of MillerCoors. Other brewery and beer importer members of the Beer Institute include Anheuser-Busch InBev, HEINEKEN USA, Crown Imports, Brooklyn Brewery, Boston Beer Co., Dogfish Head Craft Brewery, Deschutes Brewery Inc., and others.

=== Publications ===
- United States Brewers' Association, Documentary History of the United States Brewers' Association with a Sketch of Ancient Brewers' Guilds: Modern Brewers' Associations, Scientific Stations and Schools, Publications, Laws and Statistics Relating to Brewing Throughout the World, Part 1, 1896 Documentary History of the U.S. Brewers' Association with a Sketch of Ancient Brewers' Gilds: Modern Brewers' Associations, Scientific Stations and Schools, Publications, Laws and Statistics Relating to Brewing Throughout the World ..
