= Jules Achille Noël =

French painter (1815–1881)

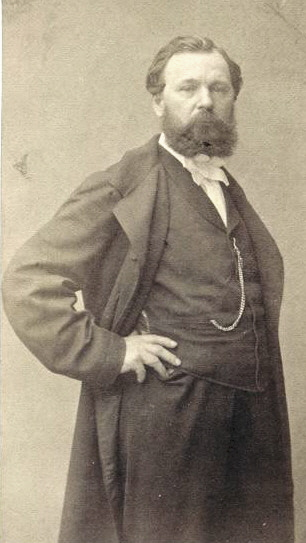
Jules Noël, photograph by Pierre Petit

Jules Achille Noël, born Louis Assez Noël (24 February 1815, Quimper – 26 March 1881, Algiers) was a French landscape and maritime painter who worked primarily in Brittany and Normandy.

== Biography ==
His family originally came from Lorraine. Some sources say that he was born there in 1810. His father was a draftsman working on the canal being built from Nantes to Brest and gave him his first drawing lessons. He later studied at the "Académie de Peinture et de Dessin" (Académie Charioux) in Brest. Afterwards, he went to Paris to seek his fortune and came under the influence of his fellow Breton painter Pierre-Julien Gilbert. After four years of struggling to earn his living, he returned to Brittany to teach drawing in Saint-Pol-de-Léon, Lorient and Nantes.

He had begun to participate in the Salon in 1840 and, in 1845, was one of several artists commissioned to provide engraved illustrations for a book on prisons by Maurice Alhoy entitled Les Bagnes: historie types, mystères.... Eventually, his work attracted the attention of Prince Louis, Duke of Nemours, who obtained him a position as a Professor of Design at the Lycée Henri-IV, where he would teach from 1847 until his retirement in 1879. Albert Lynch and Félix Buhot were among his best-known students there.

During school vacations he would return to paint in Brittany. He was in ill-health at the time of his retirement, so he went to live with his daughter and her husband in Algeria and died there.

His style was compared to Eugène Isabey and he won the praise of Baudelaire. The Musée des beaux-arts de Quimper presented a major retrospective of his works in 2005.

== Gallery ==
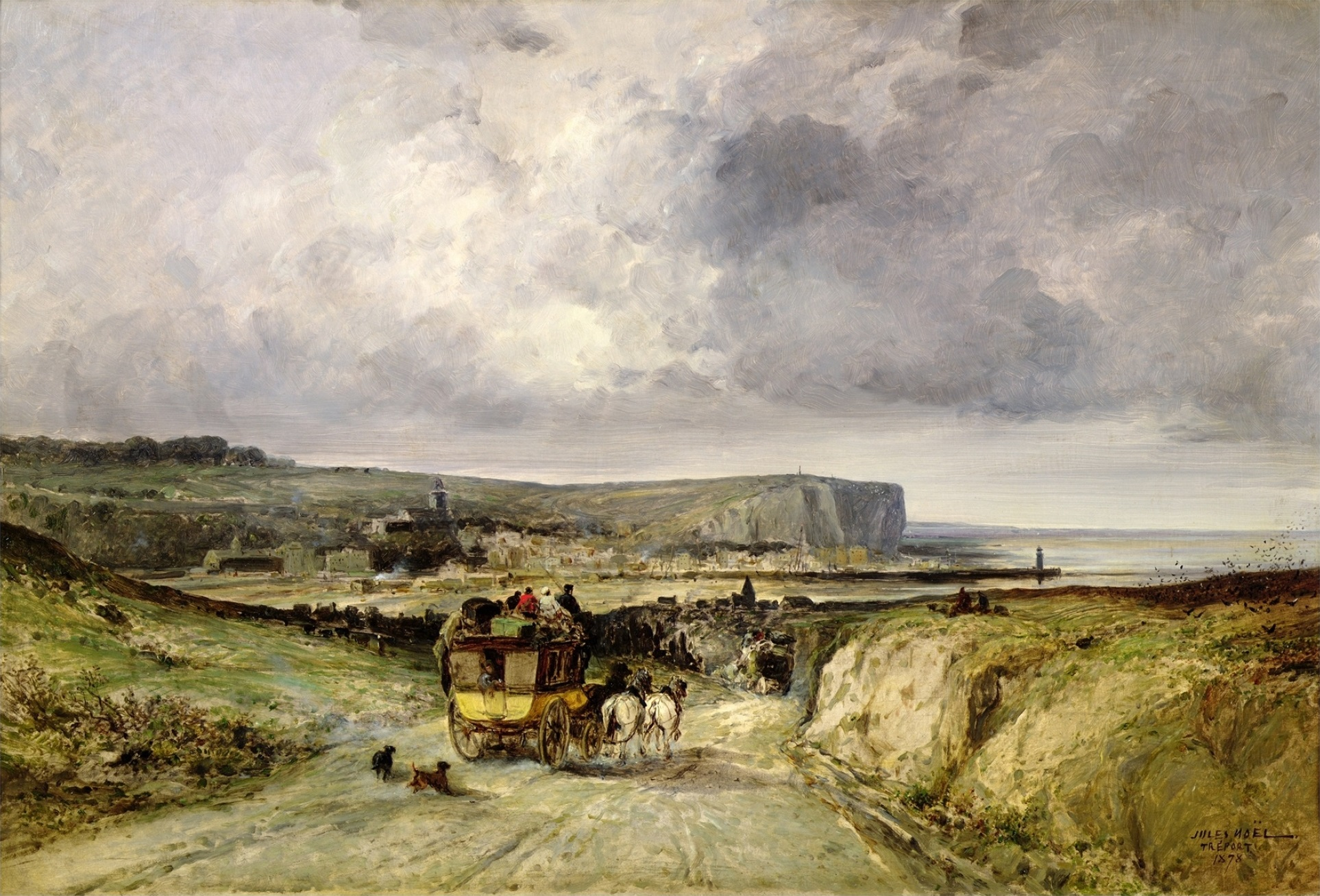
"L'Arrivee d'une Diligence au Tréport" by Jules Achille Noël. A "Diligence" was a horse-drawn coach.

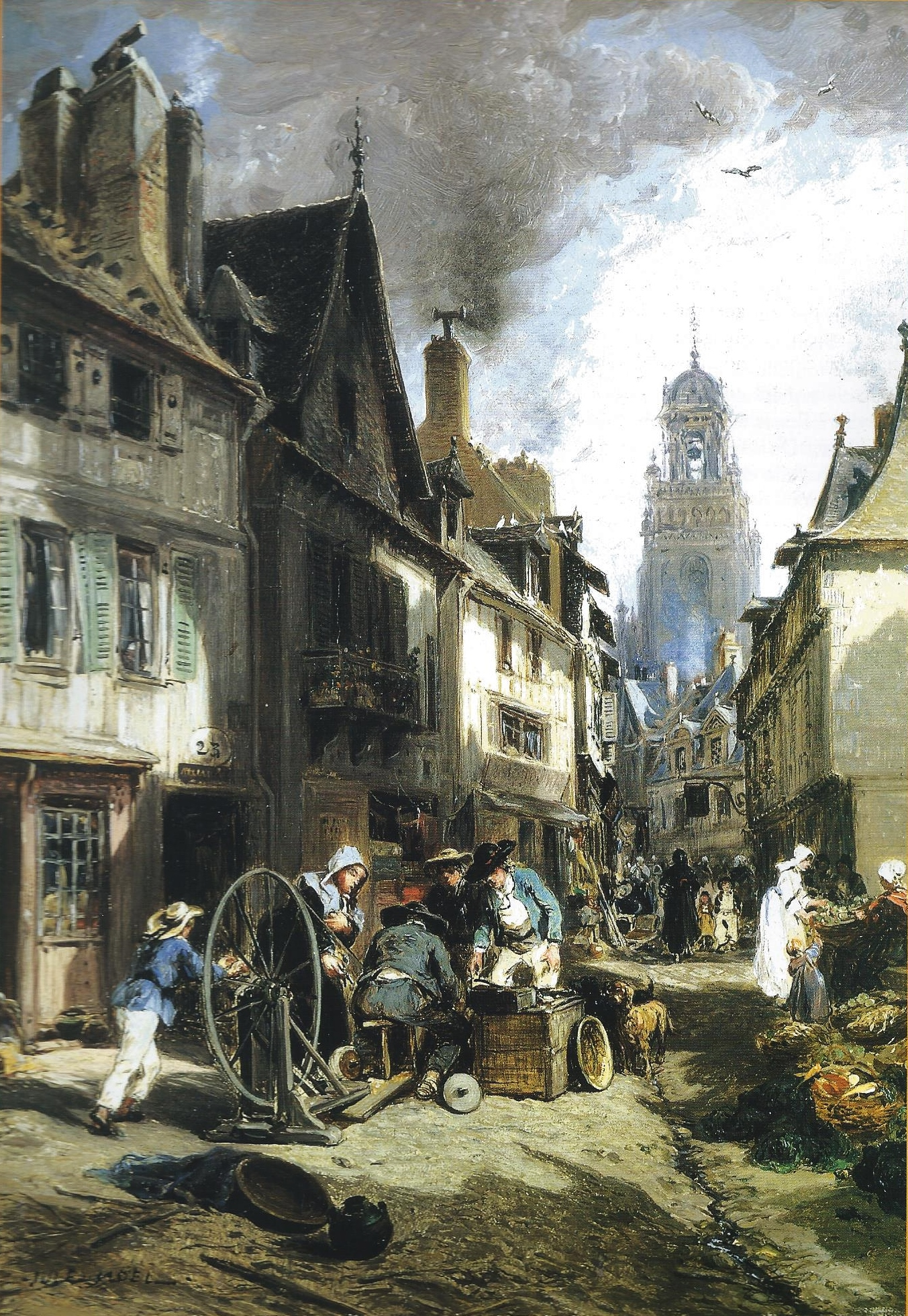
Jules Noël's painting of a wheelwright at work in a Morlaix street.

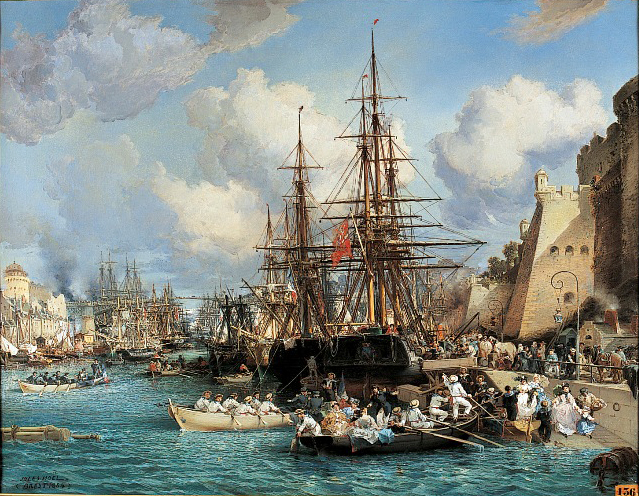
The Port of Brest (1864)
