= Gleisweiler =

- Municipality
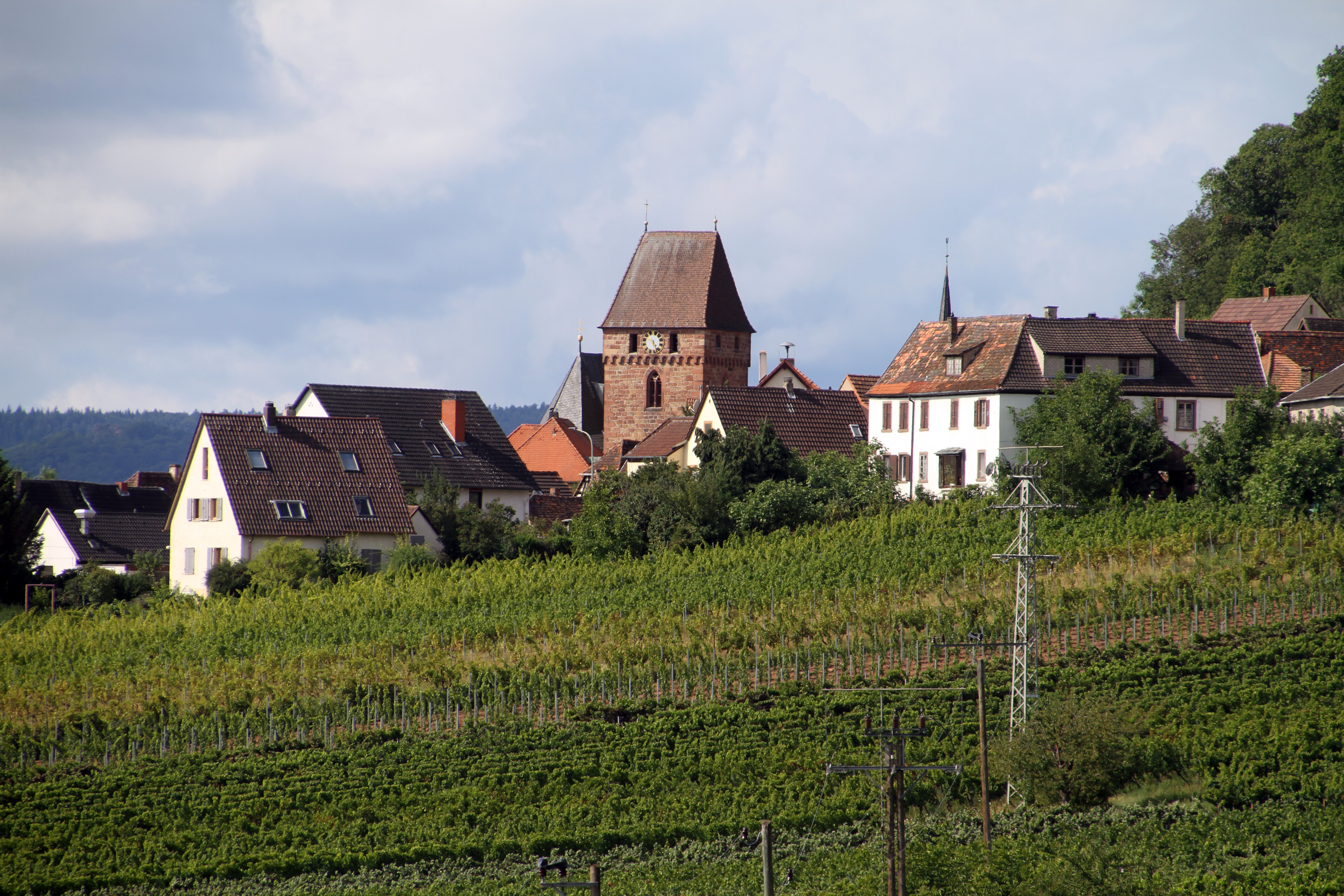

- Coat of arms

- Location of Gleisweiler within Südliche Weinstraße district
- Interactive map of Gleisweiler
- Location within Germany Location within Rhineland-Palatinate
- Coordinates: 49°14′34″N 8°03′58″E
- Country: Germany
- State: Rhineland-Palatinate
- District: Südliche Weinstraße
- Municipal assoc.: Edenkoben

Government
  - Mayor (2019–24): Thorsten Rothgerber

Area
  - Total: 3.73 km^{2} (1.44 sq mi)
- Elevation: 285 m (935 ft)

Population (2025-12-31)
  - Total: 586
  - Density: 157/km^{2} (407/sq mi)
- Time zone: UTC+01:00 (CET)
  - Summer (DST): UTC+02:00 (CEST)
- Postal codes: 76835
- Dialling codes: 06345
- Vehicle registration: SÜW
- Website: www.gleisweiler.de

Gleisweiler (German pronunciation: [ˈɡlaɪsvaɪlɐ]) is a municipality in Südliche Weinstraße district, in Rhineland-Palatinate, western Germany.
