= William Lightfoot Price =

American architect

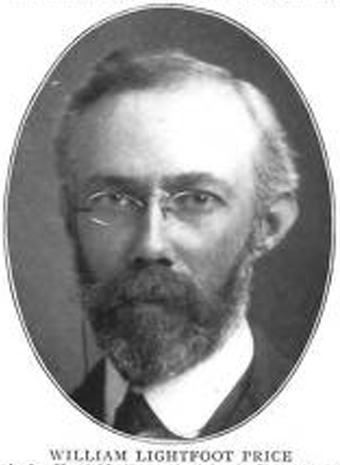
- Born: November 9, 1861; Wallingford, Pennsylvania
- Died: October 14, 1916 (aged 54); Atlantic City, New Jersey
- Occupation: Architect
- Known for: pioneer in the use of reinforced concrete
- Practice: Frank Furness, Architect W. L. and F. L. Price William Lightfoot Price
- Design: Marlborough-Blenheim Hotel; Woodmont

William Lightfoot Price (November 9, 1861 – October 14, 1916) was an American architect, a pioneer in the use of reinforced concrete, and a founder of the utopian communities of Arden, Delaware and Rose Valley, Pennsylvania.

== Early life ==
Price was born into a Quaker family in Wallingford, Pennsylvania where his father, James Martin Price, was a moderately successful nurseryman. James had previously taught at the Quaker Westtown School and later became an insurance salesman for the Provident Life and Trust Company.

== Career ==
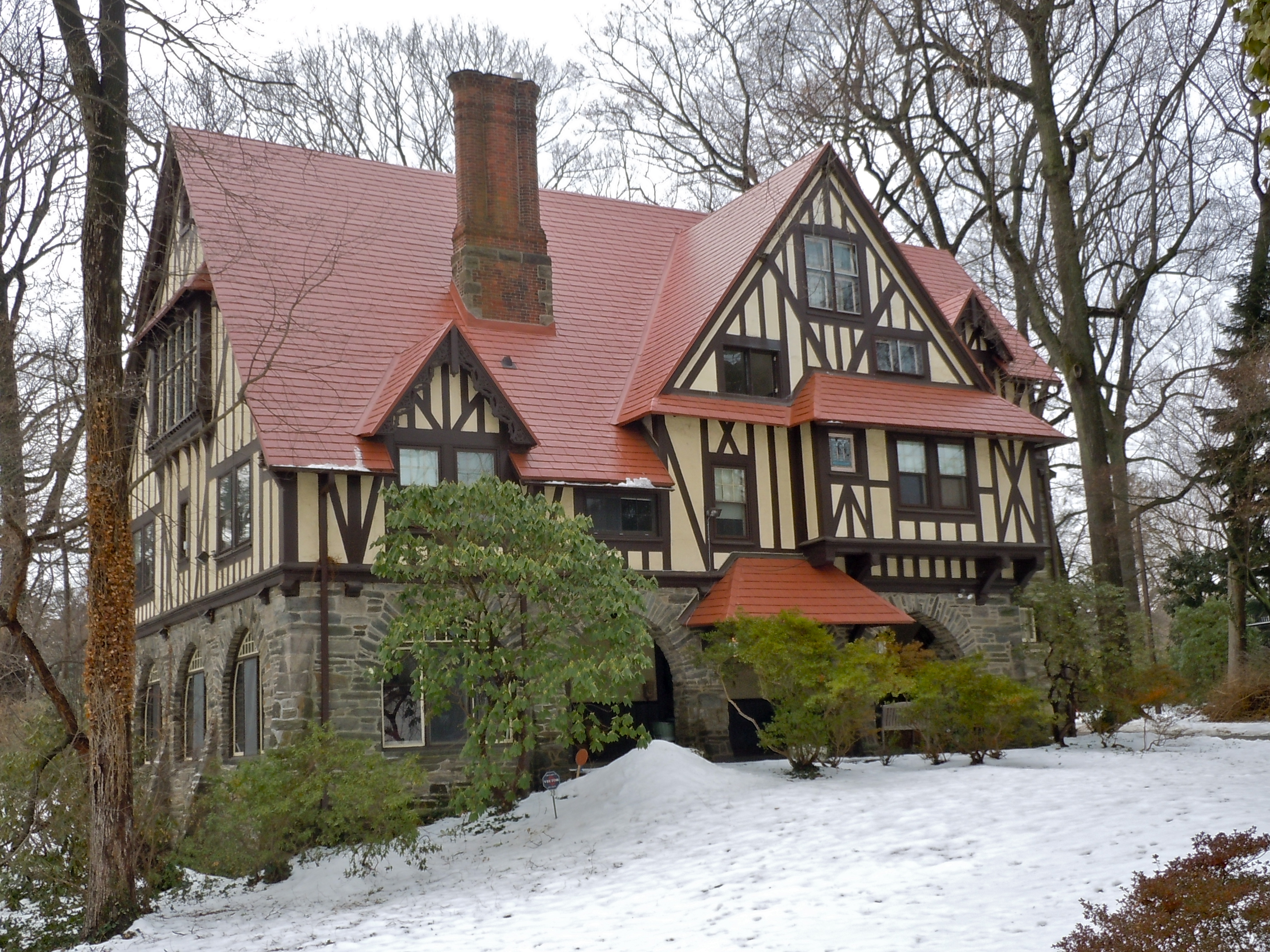
Price designed "Kelty" (1897) for himself and his family. Later owned by author Chaim Potok

At age 17, Price began work in the offices of architect Addison Hutton. He subsequently joined his brother Frank in the offices of architect Frank Furness. The brothers opened their own office, W. L. and F. L. Price, in 1881. About a year later, they were joined by their brother, Walter Ferris Price, for ten years.

Their first major commission came in 1888, to design suburban houses in Wayne, Pennsylvania for real estate developers Wendell & Smith. The brothers' partnership lasted until 1893. Price designed suburban houses for another Wendell & Smith development, "Overbrook Farms," including his own house, "Kelty" (1894). In 1903, he formed a partnership with M. Hawley McClanahan, that lasted until his death.

Price was a Quaker, and his early commissions may have come through religious ties. The owners of Philadelphia's Strawbridge & Clothier Department Store were investors with George W. Vanderbilt in a proposed resort hotel in Asheville, North Carolina, and may have recommended Price to design the Kenilworth Inn (1890–91, burned 1909). Price's familiarity with Vanderbilt's then-under-construction chateau and estate, "Biltmore," seems to have gotten him his next major commission, Woodmont.

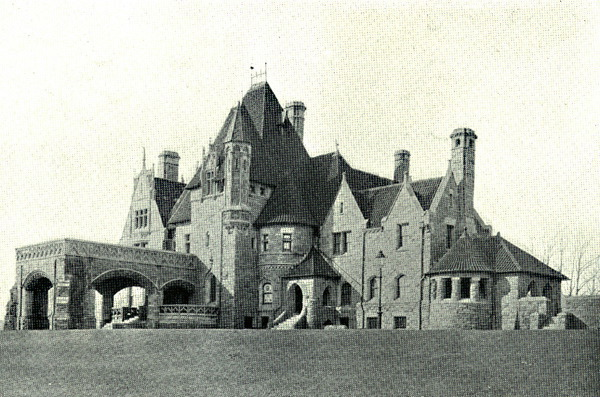
"Woodmont," Alan Wood, Jr. mansion, Gladwyne, PA (1892–94).

For steel magnate and former U.S. Congressman Alan Wood, Jr., Price designed Woodmont (1892–94), a chateauesque mansion built on the highest point in Montgomery County, Pennsylvania, a bluff overlooking the Schuylkill River, the industrial town of Conshohocken, and the Alan Wood Iron & Steel Company Plant. Price would design other palatial residences, but never again on this scale.

Price experimented with new materials, especially reinforced concrete, that were cheaper for constructing hotels and industrial buildings, and allowed wide spans and soaring spaces. At Rose Valley, a utopian community he co-founded, he built new buildings and altered existing ones, creating an Arts & Crafts village.

Price's most famous building was the Marlborough-Blenheim Hotel (1905–06), on the boardwalk in Atlantic City, New Jersey. Following the 1976 legalization of gambling in the city, architect Robert Venturi hoped to make the building the centerpiece of a casino-hotel, but its reinforced concrete had deteriorated so much that it could not be saved. It was demolished in 1979.

== Georgism ==
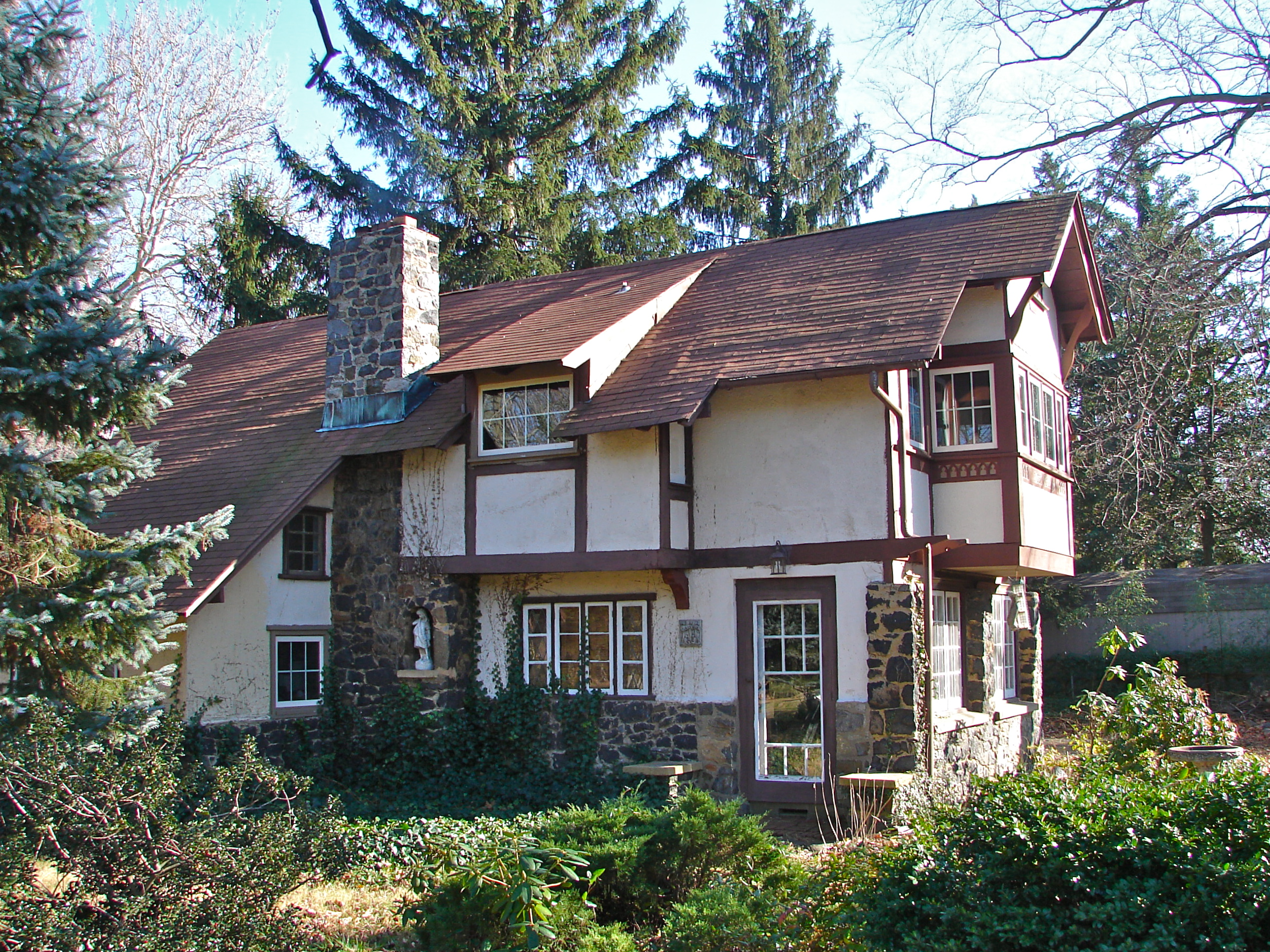
"Rest Cottage" (1910), a Price-designed house in Arden, DE

Will was an ardent Georgist and a believer in the economic philosophy of Henry George. The Arden, Delaware website (www.theardens.com) writes that "Arden was founded in 1900 by sculptor Frank Stephens and architect Will Price based on the Single Tax philosophy of Henry George, a political economist whose ideas were popular in America in the late 1800s. The land was and still is owned in common."

Additionally, the Historic Society of Delaware notes: "Stephens and Price first came to Delaware in 1895-1896 during the single-tax campaign to win political control of the state. The Single-Taxers hoped that by gaining control of a small political entity they could put their principles into action and show that they could really work. The exhibit will show a rare copy of Justice, a single-tax newspaper published in Wilmington in April 1896. The campaign failed—many of the activists were jailed—but Price and Stephens did not give up their dream. In 1900, they purchased the Derrickson farm in northern New Castle County. Price designed a town plan that preserved communal open space and encouraged people to mingle with their neighbors. Stephens and Price adopted "You are welcome hither" as the community motto because they wanted Arden to be a place open to people of all economic levels and political views, a new departure in an era when restrictions were the norm. Price never lived in Arden, but built and owned a handful of cottages;—he was more deeply involved in Rose Valley, another idealistic community nearby in Pennsylvania—but Frank Stephens did. (Stephens's) enthusiasm, leadership, and ideas guided Arden from a dream to reality. His son Donald also played a vital role in the community."

== Rose Valley ==
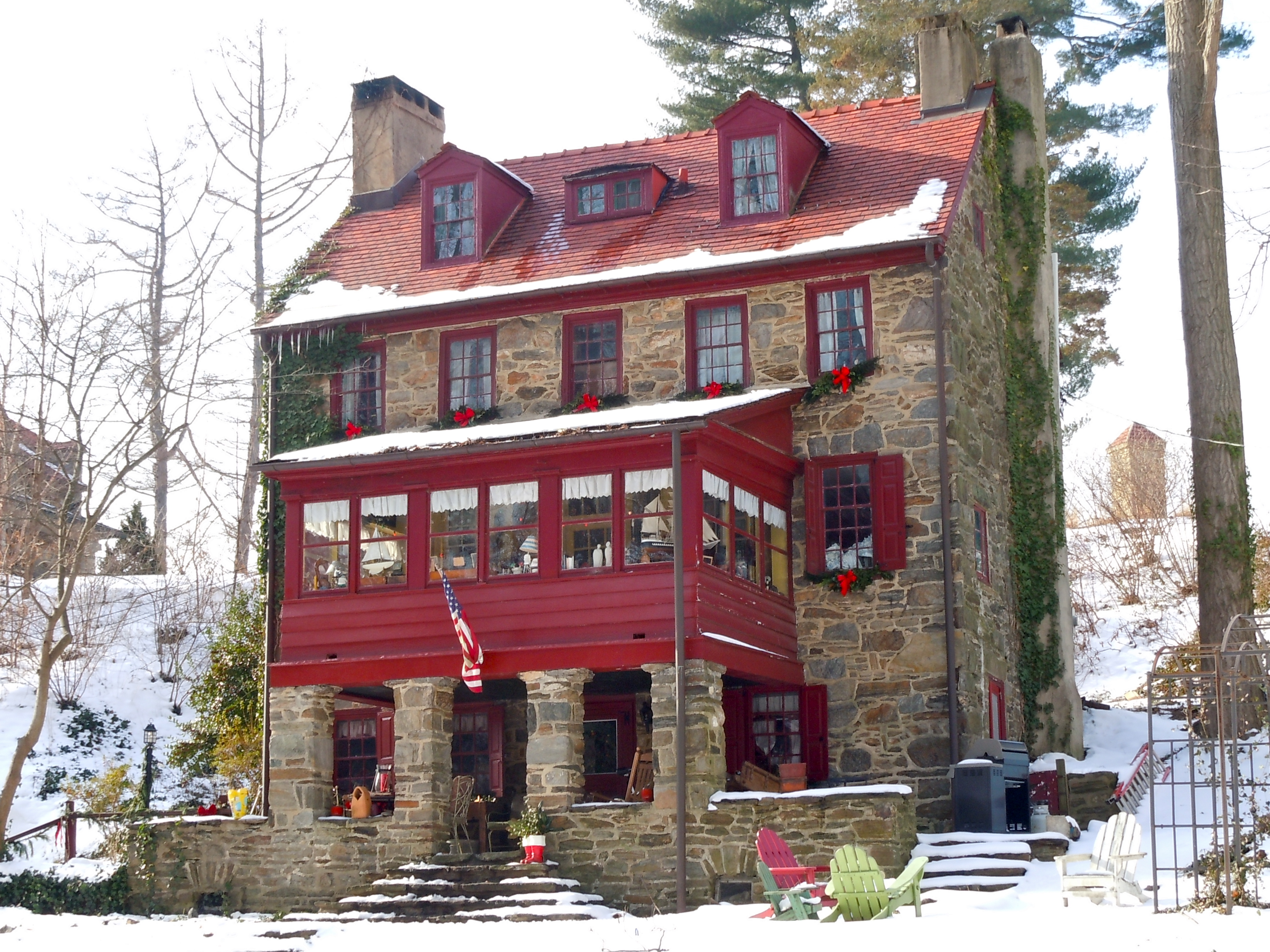
"Bishop White House", Rose Valley, PA (altered 1902). Price added the 2-story porch and tile roof.

The Rose Valley Museum and Historical Society writes the following about Will Price:

Will Price died in 1916 at 55. It has been argued that, had he had as long a career as his contemporary Frank Lloyd Wright (1867-1959), Price might also have been a giant among the world’s architects. There is certainly much about his later work like the Atlantic City hotels and the Chicago Freight Terminal to indicate a radically modern direction. And modernism exists in his earlier work, but it is now more difficult to see or understand. The houses he built before founding Rose Valley are made from the same hodge-podge of materials as any other turn-of-the-century American architect used for the show places of rich clients: cut and rough stone, cedar and slate shingles, Gothic and half-timber wood work, red brick and buff stucco. All of this historicism hid modern systems like electricity, steam heat, and interior plumbing.

When Price came to Rose Valley, there were twelve small houses, two old mills, and a historic stone house once occupied by Bishop White. Price rehabilitated some buildings, slip covered others and, eventually, put up completely new houses. The old bobbin mill was given a quaint rustic porch. A farmhouse above the Bishop White house was encased in stucco and tile and expanded to become the grandest house in the valley, "Schönhaus".

=== House of the Democrat ===
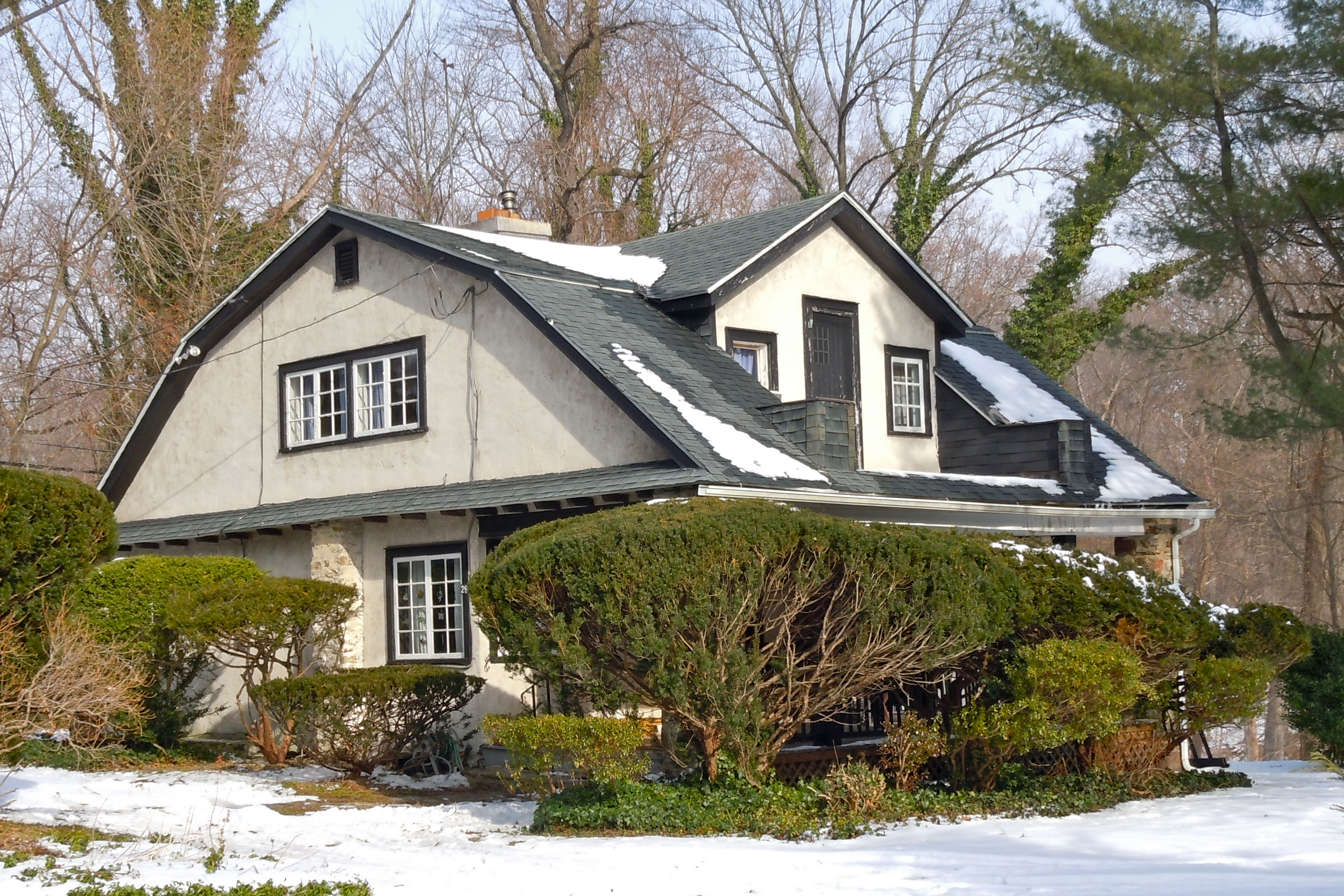
"House of the Democrat", Rose Valley, PA (1911–12).

An unpretentious cottage went up on Price's Lane, "House of the Democrat", which became one of the most influential buildings of the American Arts and Crafts movement.

Before it was built, Price published designs for this house in several influential magazines with a national circulation like Ladies' Home Journal. Along with other Arts and Crafts proselytizers like Gustav Stickley, Price sought to convince Americans that they didn't need to "keep up with the Joneses". He admonished both rich and poor to “...dispense with the plush albums and tea-store chromos and self-playing melodeons and comic operas and the daily installment of wood-pulp which calls itself the modern newspaper. Resigning these luxuries, they will get what in return? They will still have the necessaries of life and some of the comforts.” In 1903 Price wrote a book called Home Building and Furnishing. Being a Combined New Edition of "Model Houses for Little Money" published together with Inside of 100 Homes by W. M. Johnson in which they made an effort to distill his idea about how anyone's home could have everything it needed to live the art that is life without costly materials and elaborate detail. The mere consideration of the quality of housing for the average person was a modern notion. Earlier architects may have designed small houses, but they were for the relatively rich. If and when housing was contemplated for anyone else, it was usually in terms of cheap, exploitative development.

=== Thunderbird Lodge ===
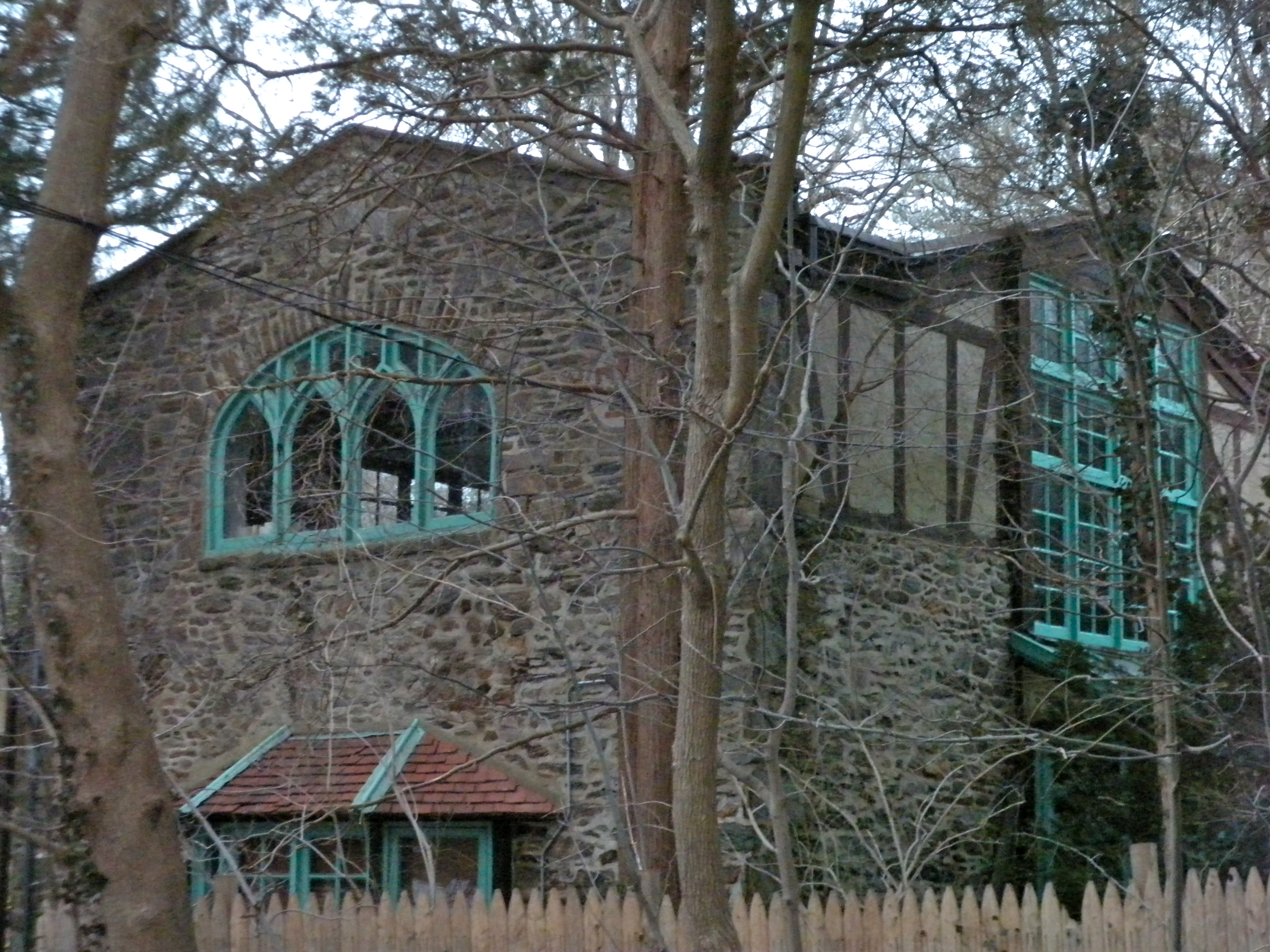
Price altered an existing barn into "Thunderbird Lodge" (1904).

"Thunderbird Lodge", is the studio house of Charles and Alice Barber Stephens designed by Price. His idea of a modern home is one that fits the life its owners lived. He was very much against copying historical styles because not everyone lived like Roman emperors or French royalty. He thought beauty would come not from the architect's design but from the fitness of purpose, place, and materials. The most eloquent example of this ideal is found in Rose Valley's "Thunderbird Lodge".

The structure grew from an existing stone bank barn. The second floor of the barn became a studio for Charles while the first was shaped into another for Alice. The name of the house derived from Charles Stephens's passionate interest in Native American artifacts. His collection eventually became the core of the University of Pennsylvania museum collection. The fireplace in the upstairs studio is said to have the form of a Thunderbird, a symbol that also appears on the studio exterior, this time made of Henry Mercer's Moravian tiles.

Price described the house: "The old barn standing near the road was converted into first and second floor studios, the old timber roof being rebuilt for the upper studio, and large windows and fireplaces being built into the old walls. The house rambles off from the fireplace and off the studios and is connected to them by an octagonal stair hall. It is built in part of fieldstone so like that in the old barn that it is almost impossible to tell old work from new. The upper part is of warm gray plaster, and the roof of red tile. All of the detail is as simple and direct as possible, and the interior is finished in cypress stained to soft browns and grays and guilty of no finish other than wax or oil."

Citing the way the house fit its site, the way the pergola helped integrate the building and gardens, the use of local materials, and the references to indigenous architecture, magazines compared it to the designs of Frank Lloyd Wright who was then just beginning to develop his signature Prairie School style.

Thunderbird Lodge later became the home of the Olmsteds: Judge Allen and Mildred Scott Olmsted, both well-known social activists. He was instrumental in the founding of the American Civil Liberties Union, and she was a tireless proponent of the Women's International League for Peace and Freedom. Under the terms of Mildred Scott Olmsted's will, Thunderbird Lodge was donated to the Rose Valley Centennial Foundation in 2015 "to preserve it in perpetuity".

Price's architectural drawings along with those of his brother Walter are at the Athenaeum of Philadelphia.

== Furniture ==
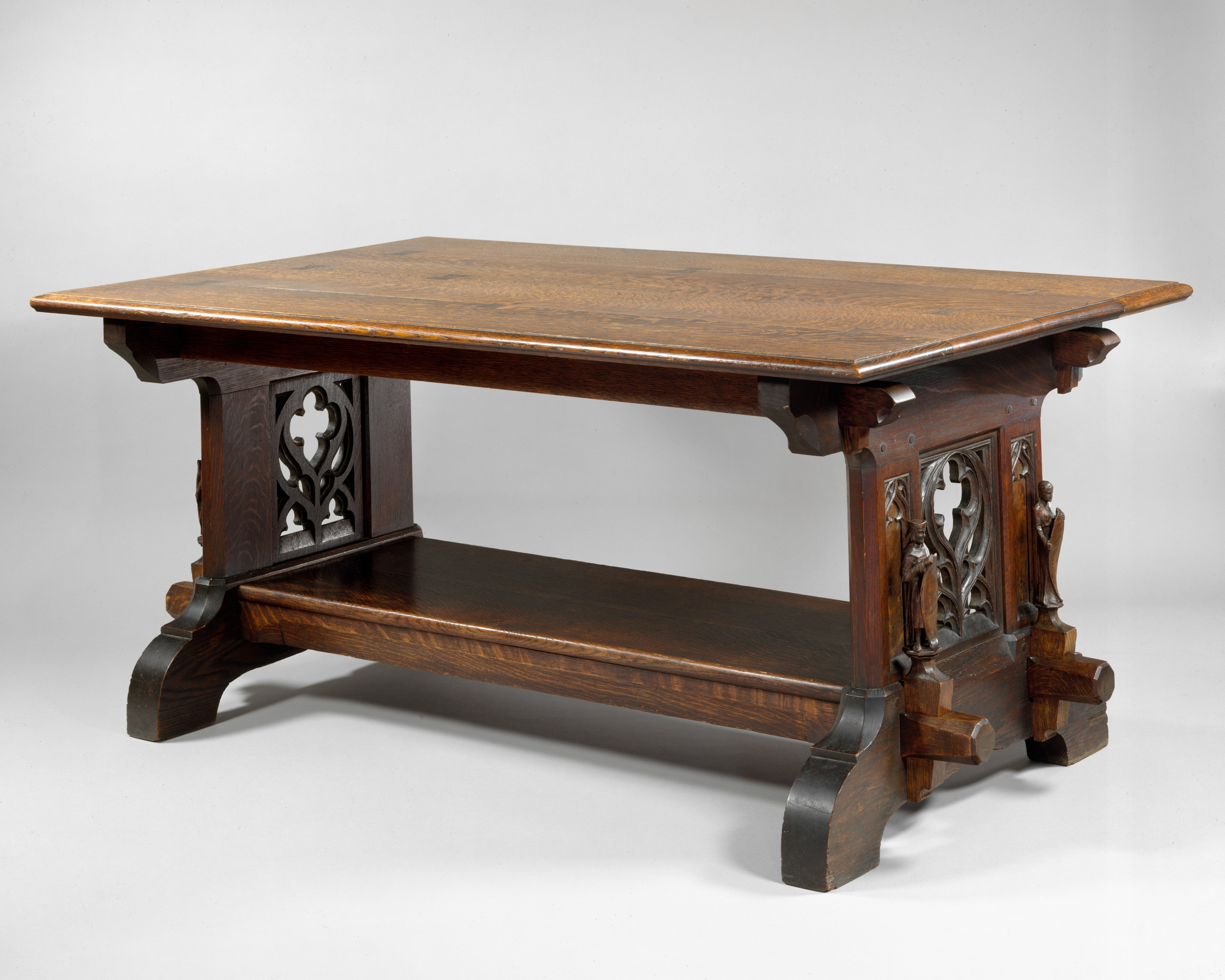
Library table (1904), Rose Valley Furniture Shop, Metropolitan Museum of Art

Price often designed custom-made furniture for his houses. He opened a furniture manufacturing shop at Rose Valley in 1901, to execute his designs. Belgian-American carver John J. Maene managed the shop from 1902 to its closure in 1906.

=== Shakespeare cabinet ===
William Welsh Harrison, heir to a sugar-refining fortune, commissioned an elaborate Gothic Revival cabinet to house his First Folio of Shakespeare plays. The commission was given to architect Horace Trumbauer – who had designed Harrison's residence, Grey Towers Castle (1893–97), in Glenside, Pennsylvania – but it was Price who designed the piece's highly carved oak casing. The cabinet featured statuettes of Shylock and Portia, characters from The Merchant of Venice. The piece was not listed in the Rose Valley shop's records, and "was probably made in Edward Maene's shop."

Warren Powers Laird, director of the University of Pennsylvania School of Architecture, described the Harrison Shakespeare Folio Cabinet as "the finest piece of furniture ever made in this country." Its current whereabouts is unknown.

== Selected buildings ==
=== Pennsylvania ===
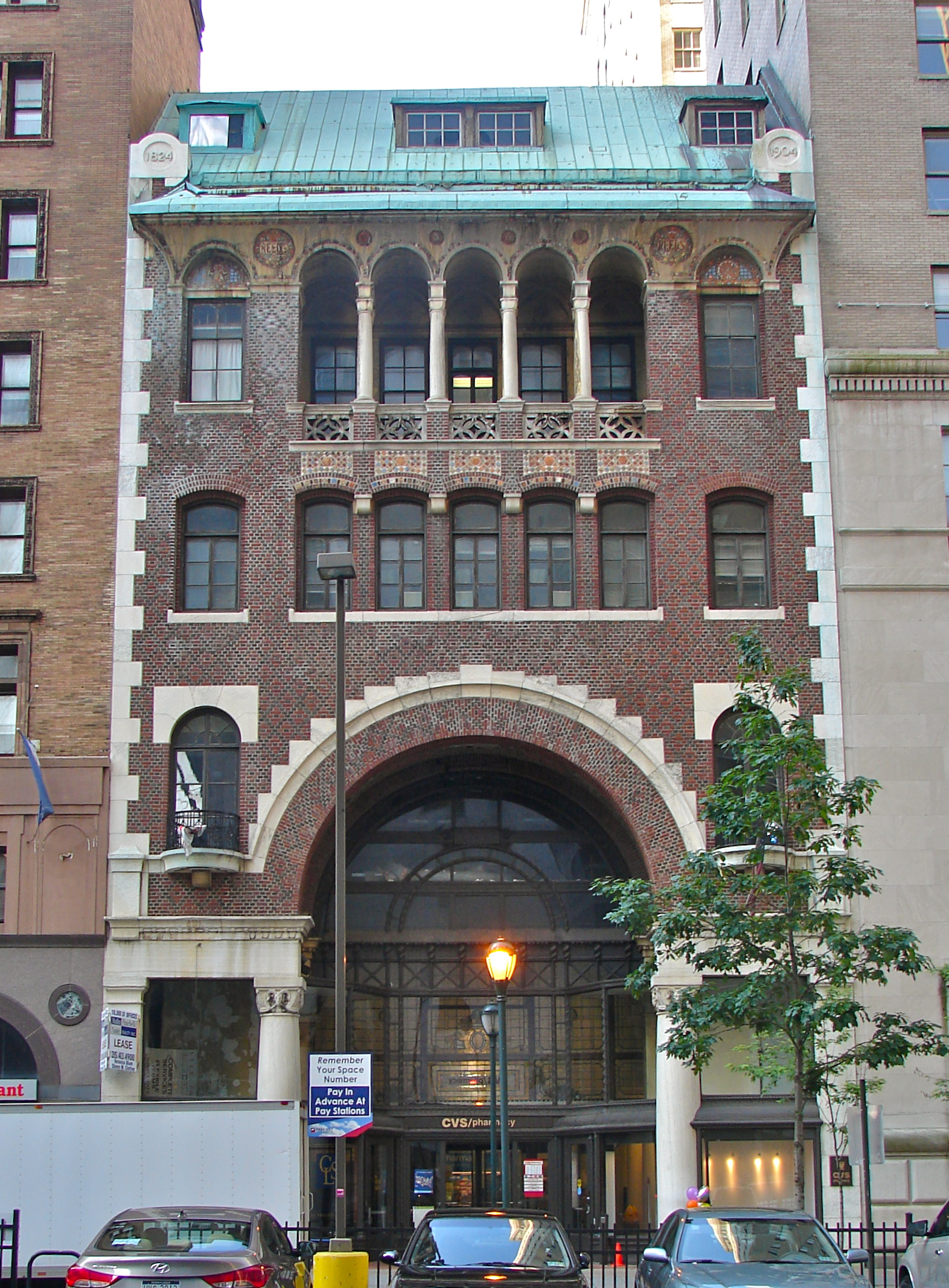
Jacob Reed's Sons, 1424 Chestnut St., Philadelphia (1903).

- "Woodmont," Alan Wood, Jr. mansion, 1622 Spring Mill Road, Gladwyne, Pennsylvania (1892–94). Now headquarters for International Peace Mission movement.
- Will Price house, 6334 Sherwood Road, Overbrook Farms, Philadelphia, Pennsylvania (1894).
- Winston Commons Apartments, 6620-24 Germantown Avenue, Philadelphia, Pennsylvania (1895).
- Alterations to "Robindale," John S. Clarke house, Morris Avenue & Yarrow Street, Bryn Mawr, Pennsylvania (1896 and 1901). Now Benham Gateway Building (Admissions Office), Bryn Mawr College. Frank Furness designed the original c.1883 house.
- John Marshall Guest house, 5620 City Avenue, Philadelphia, Pennsylvania (1897–98). Now Wolfington Hall, Saint Joseph's University.
- "Glenmede", 630 Old Gulph Road, Bryn Mawr, Pennsylvania (1902–04). Considered the crown jewel of the Philadelphia Main Line. A 15-acre estate designed for George Scott Graham and bought by Joseph Newton Pew in 1904. Held by the Pew family until it was donated to Bryn Mawr College, which sold it privately in 2007.
- Jacob Reed's Sons Store, 1424 Chestnut Street, Philadelphia, Pennsylvania (1903–04). An early reinforced concrete structure, with brick cladding and Mercer tile mosaic work.
- Edward W. Bok house, 443 N. Highland Avenue, Merion, Pennsylvania (1905)
- Media Armory, 12 E. State Street, Media, Pennsylvania (1908).
- Roslin House, built in 1911, donated to Haverford College in 1948.

==== Rose Valley ====
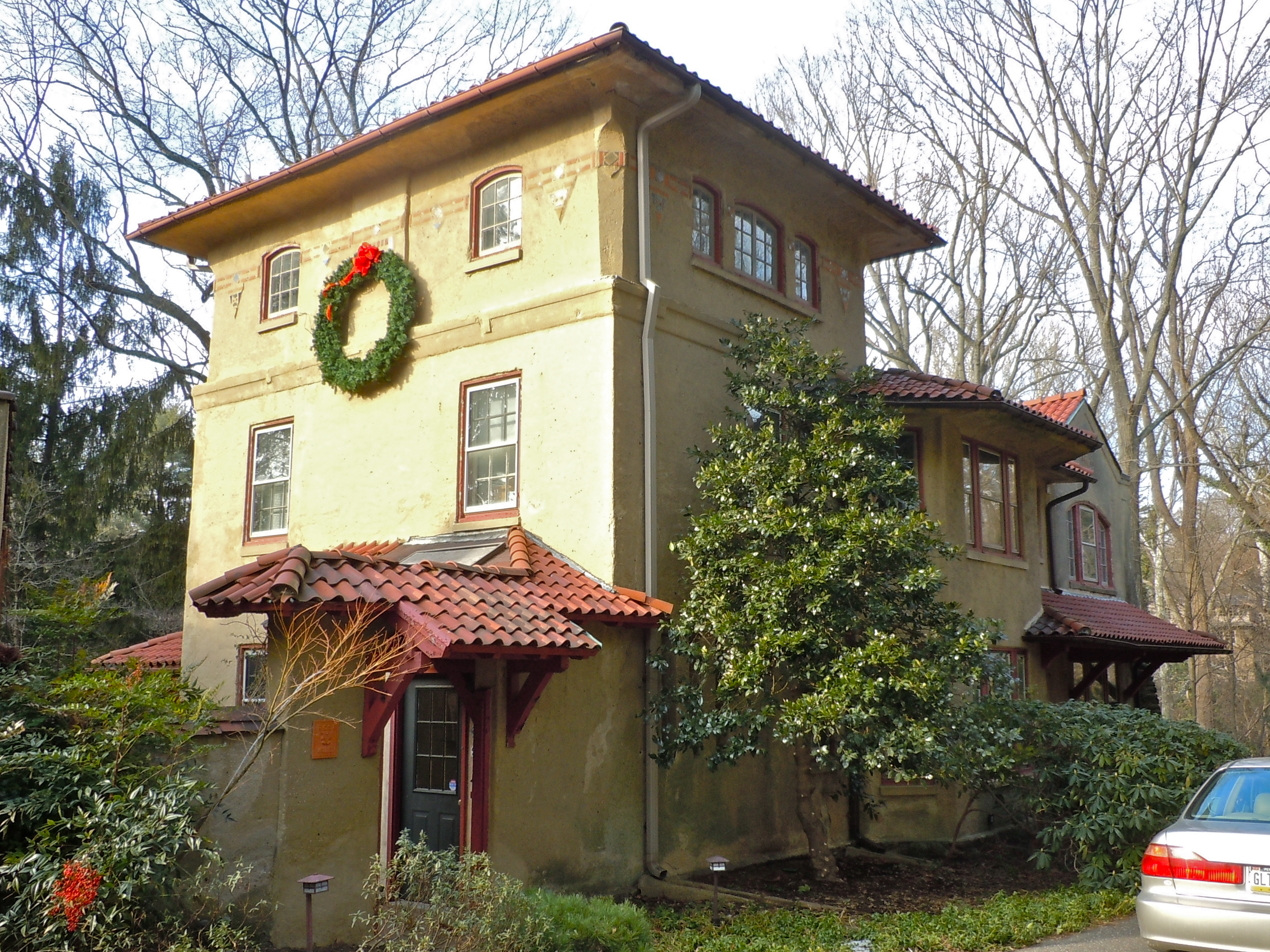
A Rose Valley Improvement Company house

- Altered 8 existing rowhouses into "Guest House" (1901).
- "Camaredeil," Will Price house, (1901).
- "Bishop White House" alterations to (1902). Price added the 2-story porch and the tile roof.
- Bobbin Mill conversion to "Guild Hall" (c.1904). Now Hedgerow Theater.
- Altered an existing barn into "Thunderbird Lodge," Charles & Alice Barber Stephens house (1904), 45 Rose Valley Road.
- "Schönhaus" (1904–05).
- "Auntie Bess Warrington House" (1908), 7 Price's Lane.
- "Roylencroft" (1909).
- "House of the Democrat," (1911–12).
- Rose Valley Improvement Company houses on Porter Lane (after 1910).

=== New Jersey ===
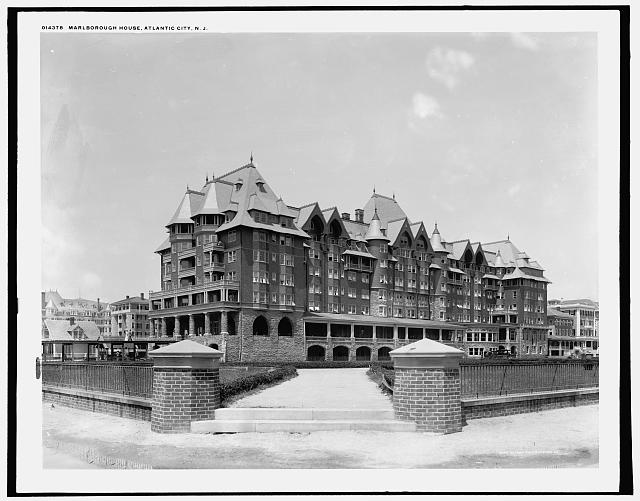
Marlborough House Hotel, Atlantic City, NJ (1902, demolished 1979).

- Marlborough House Hotel, Atlantic City, New Jersey (1902, demolished 1979). This was later combined with the Blenheim Hotel.
- Blenheim Hotel, Atlantic City, New Jersey (1905–1906, demolished 1979). At the time of its construction, the largest reinforced-concrete building in the world.
- Traymore Hotel, Atlantic City, New Jersey (1914–1915, demolished 1972).

=== Delaware ===
- Second "Frank Stephens Homestead," Arden, Delaware (1909).
- Altered the existing Derrickson Barn into "Gild Hall," Arden, Delaware (1910).

=== Other U.S. locations ===
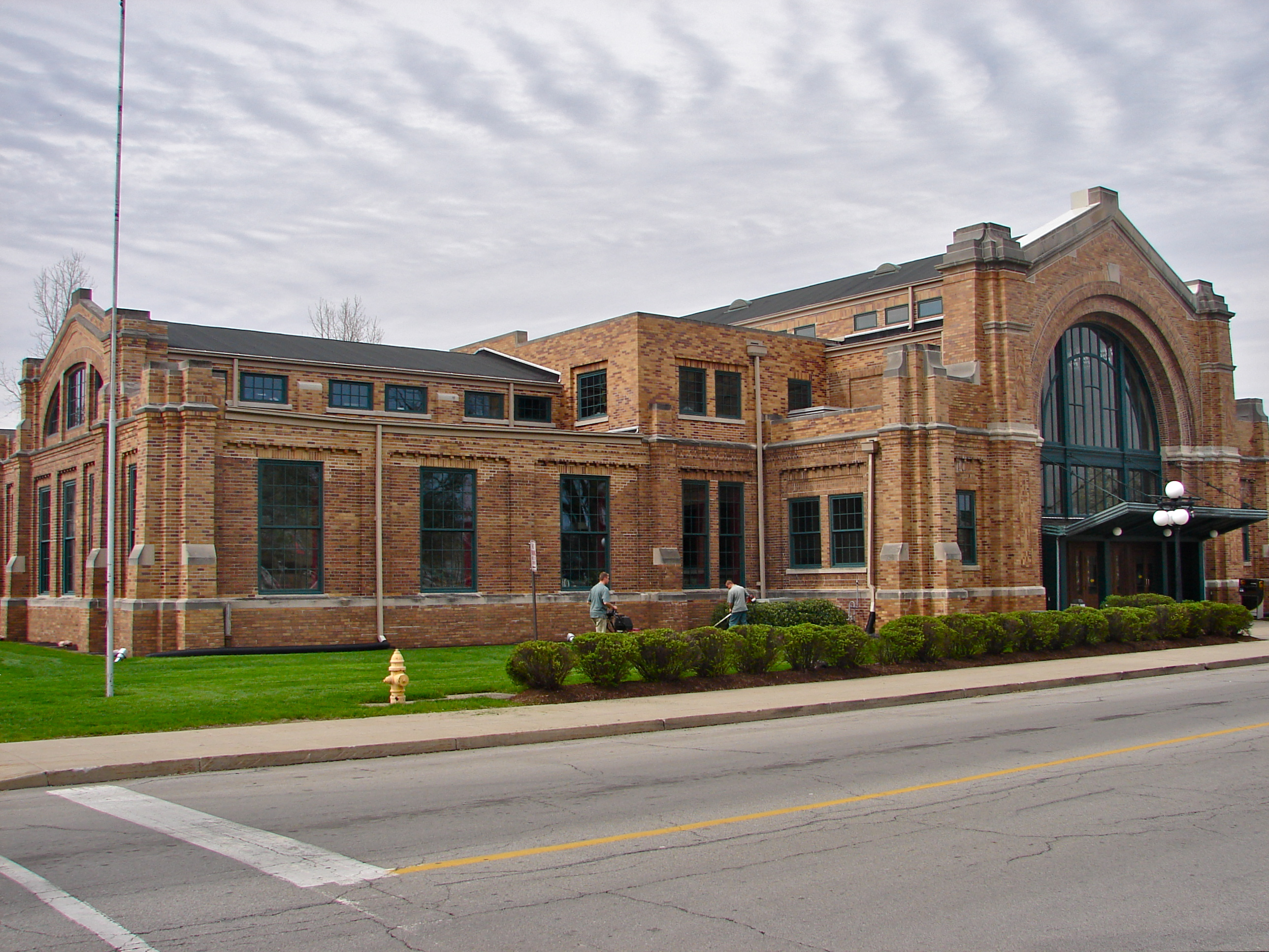
Pennsylvania Station in Ft. Wayne, IN

- Pennsylvania Railroad Depot, Converse, Indiana (1912)
- Kenilworth Inn, Asheville, North Carolina (1890–91, burned 1909).
- Pennsylvania Railroad Freight Terminal, Chicago, Illinois (1914–1918, demolished 1974).
- Pennsylvania Railroad Station, Fort Wayne, Indiana (1914).
- Additions to Union Station, Indianapolis, Indiana (1915–20).
- Flamingo Hotel, Miami Beach, Florida (1921, demolished 1950s).

== Gallery ==
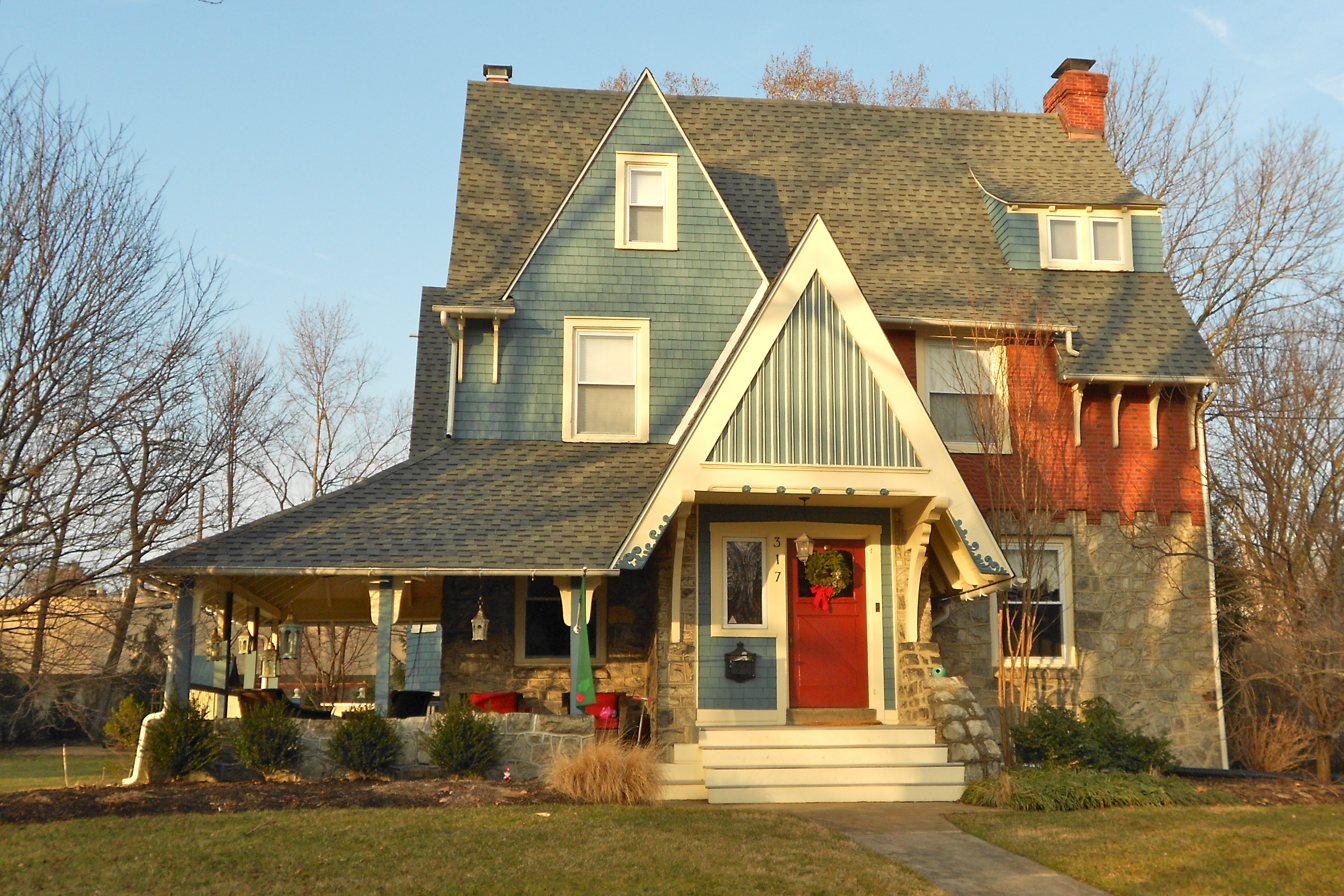
Circa-1890 Price-design house in Wayne, PA

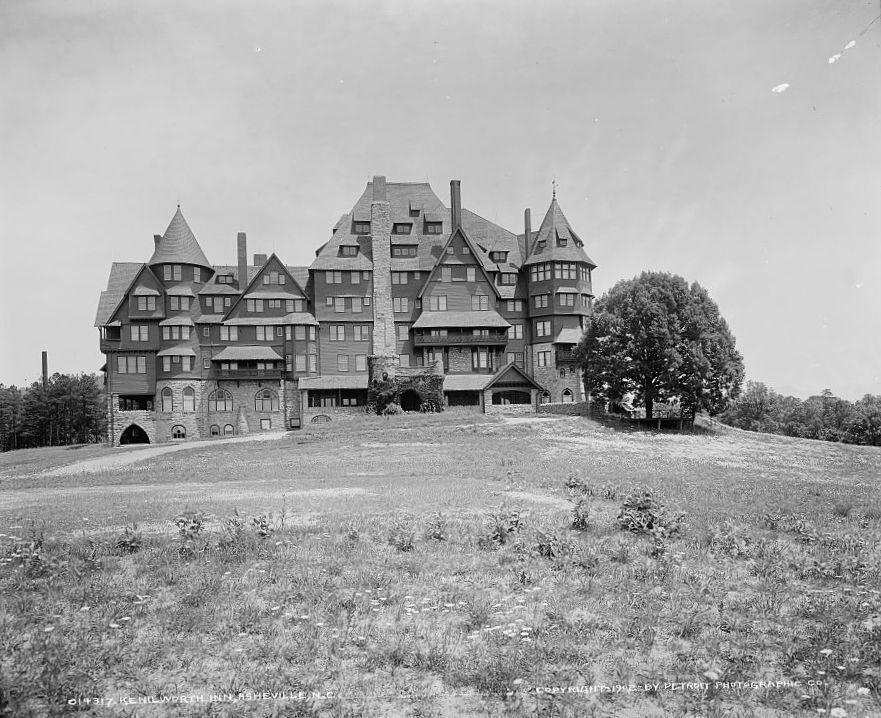
Kenilworth Inn, Asheville, NC (1890–91, burned 1909).

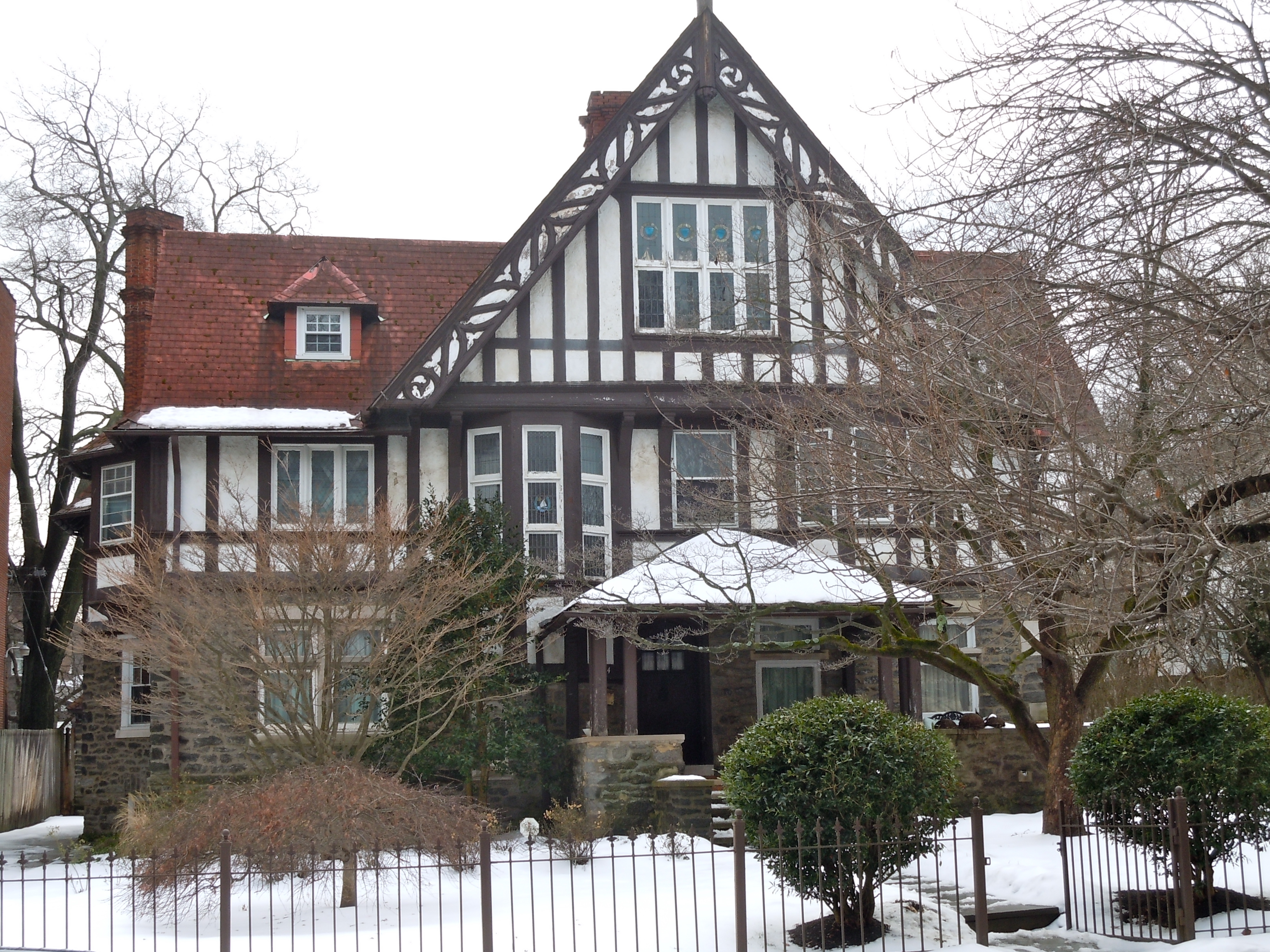
6334 Sherwood Rd. in Overbrook Farms (1894)

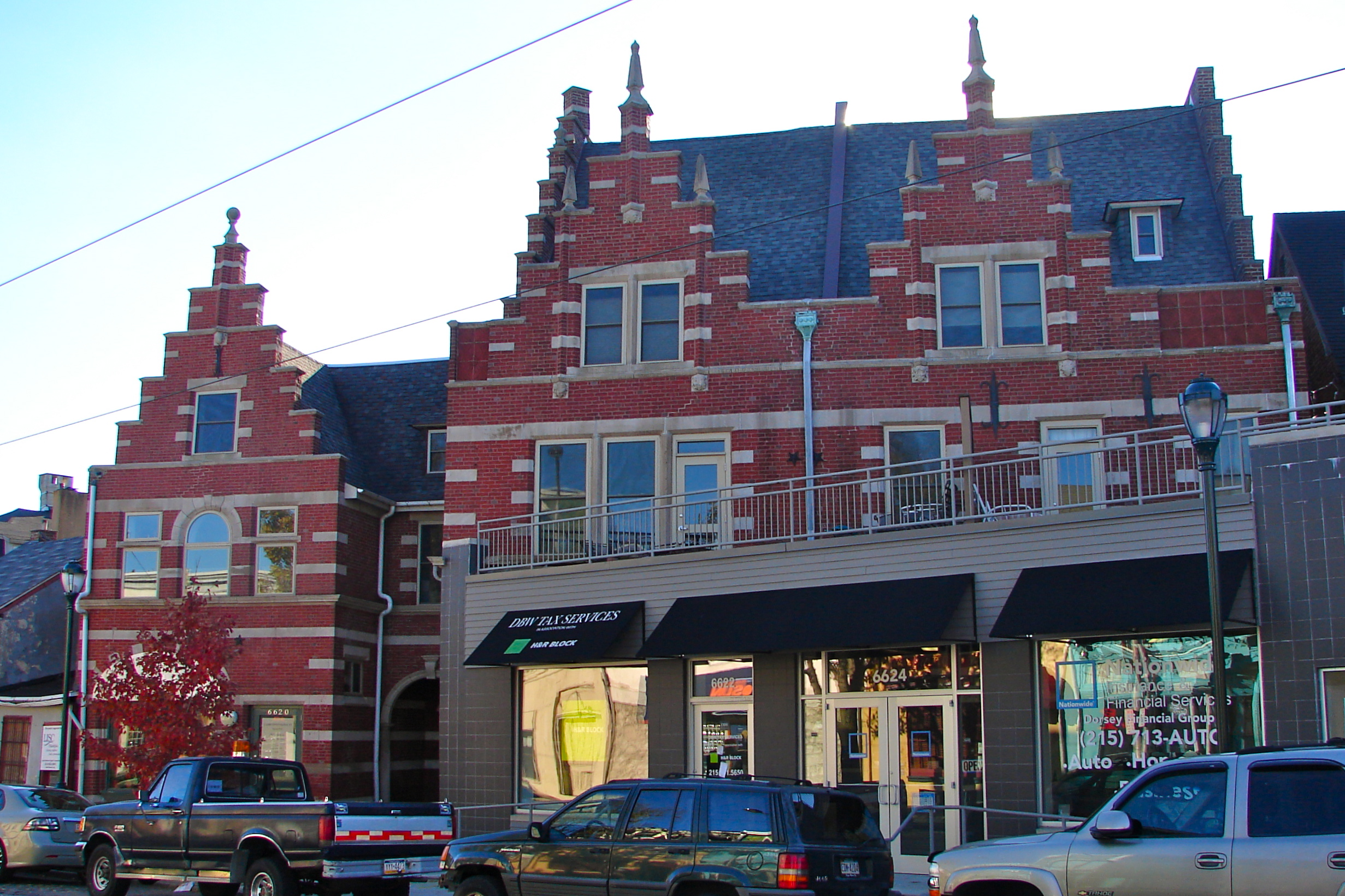
Winston Commons Apartments, Germantown, Philadelphia, PA (1895).

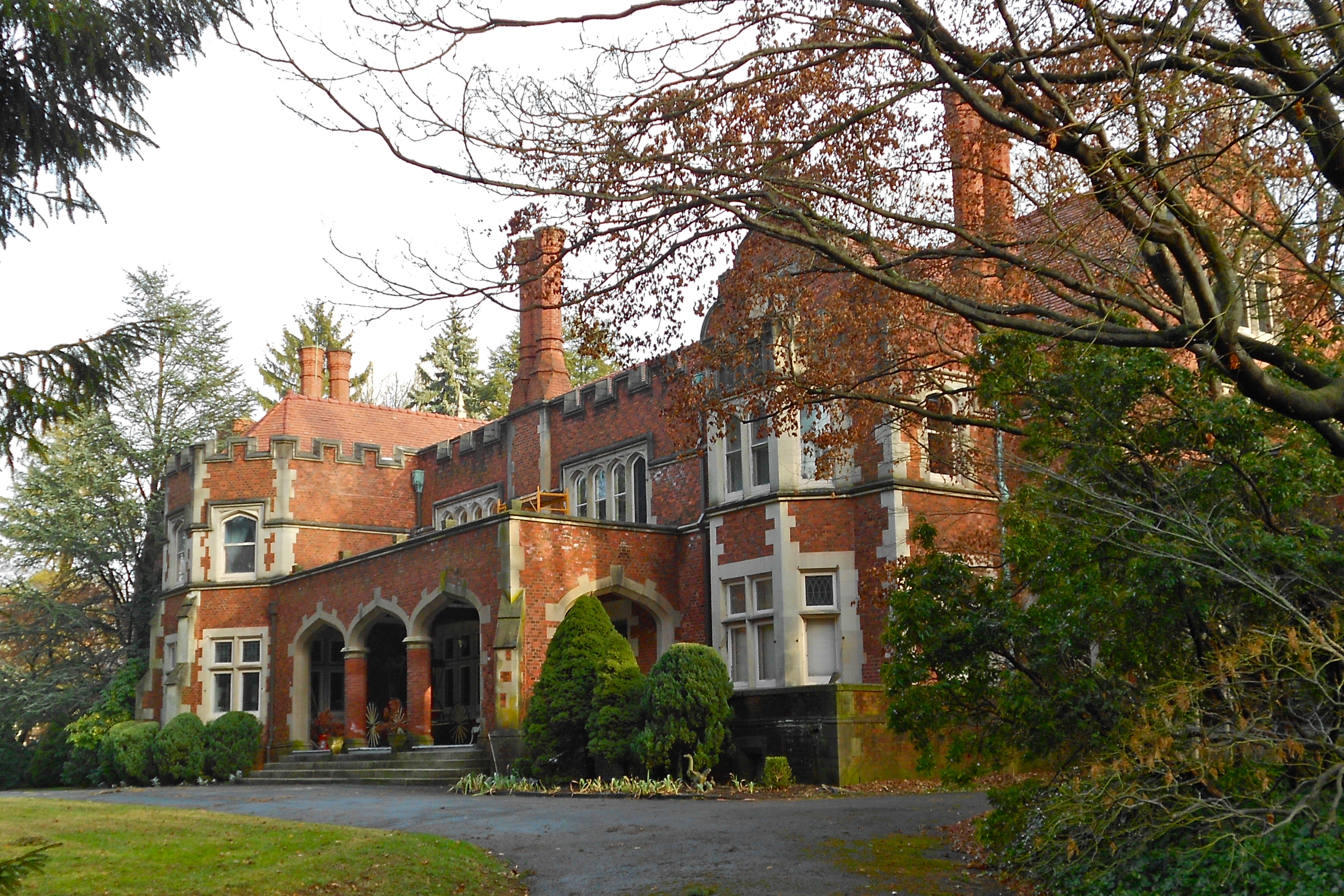
"Car–Alan," Alan H. Reed house, Wayne, Pennsylvania (1898–99).

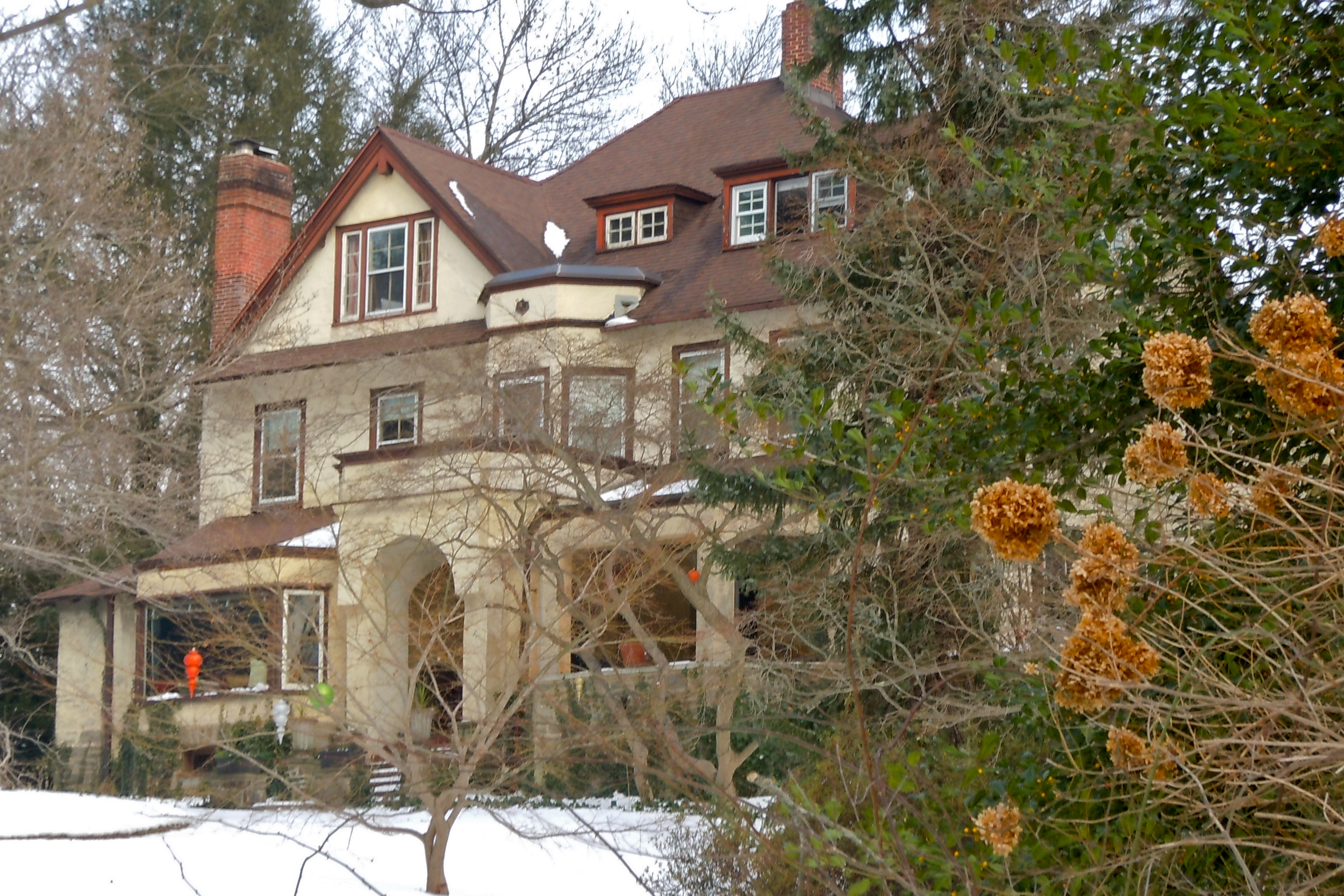
"Camaredeil," Will Price house, Rose Valley, PA (1901).

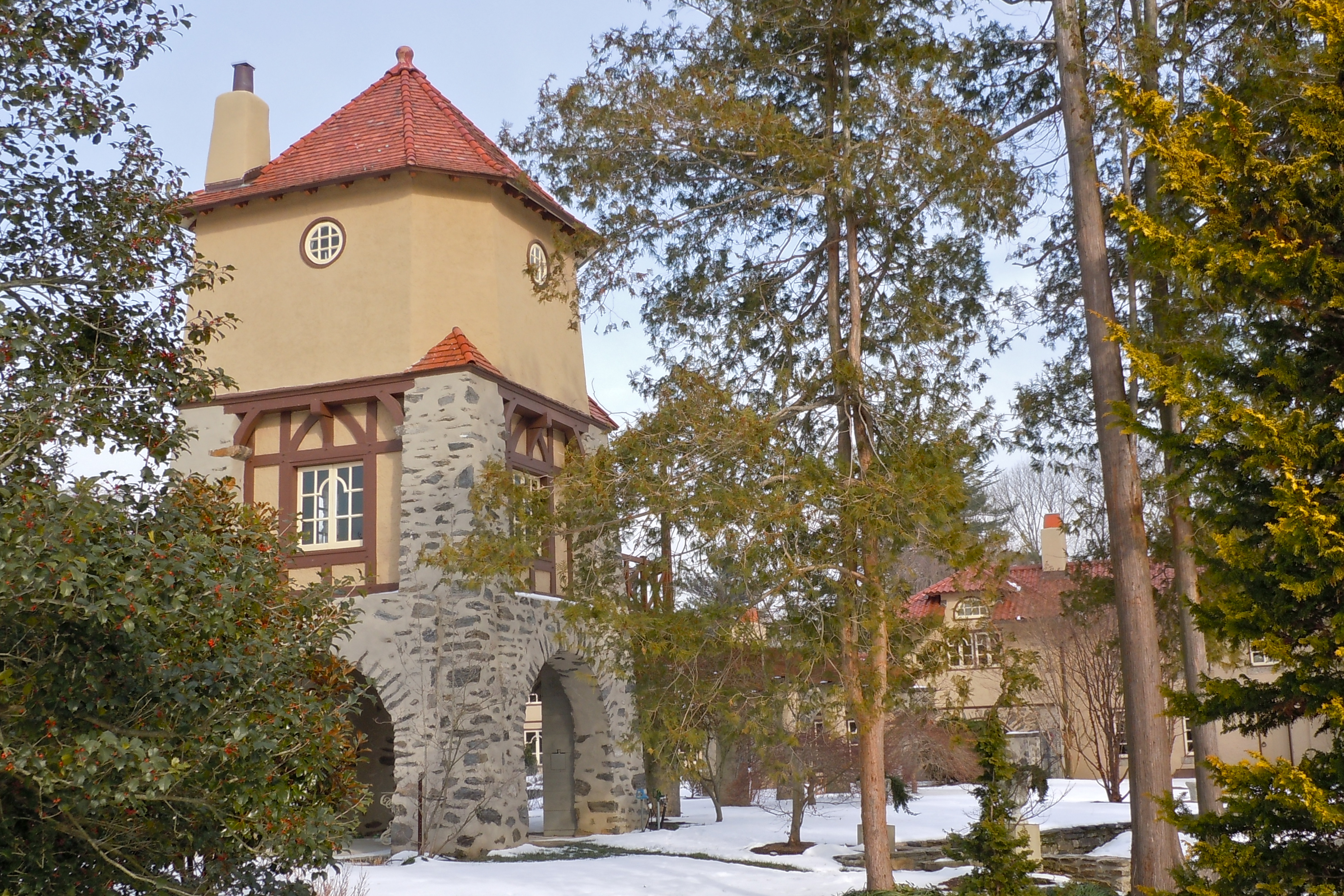
"Schönhaus" watertower and house, Rose Valley, PA (1904–05).

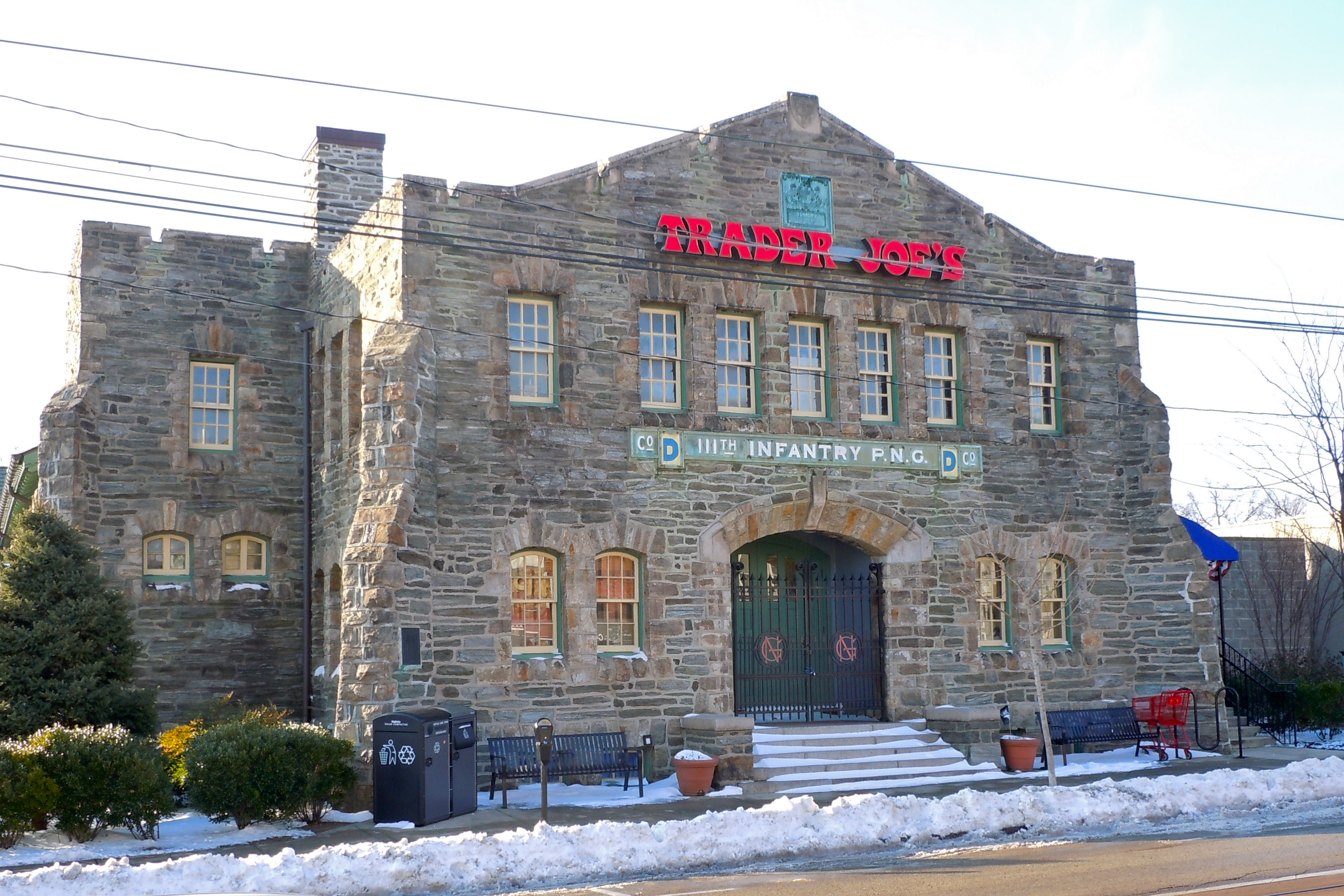
Media Armory, Media, PA (1908).

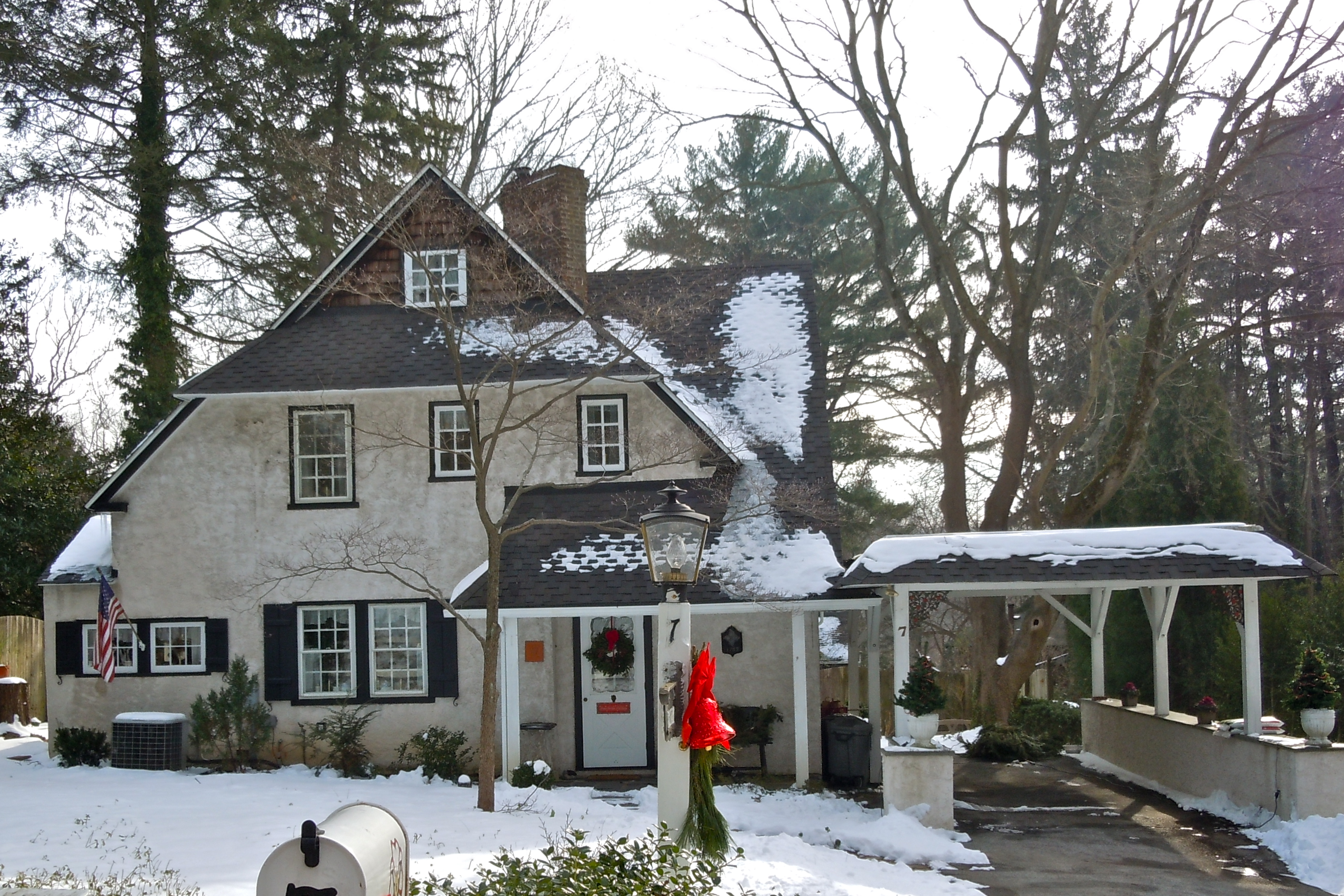
"Auntie Bess Warrington House," Rose Valley, PA (1908).

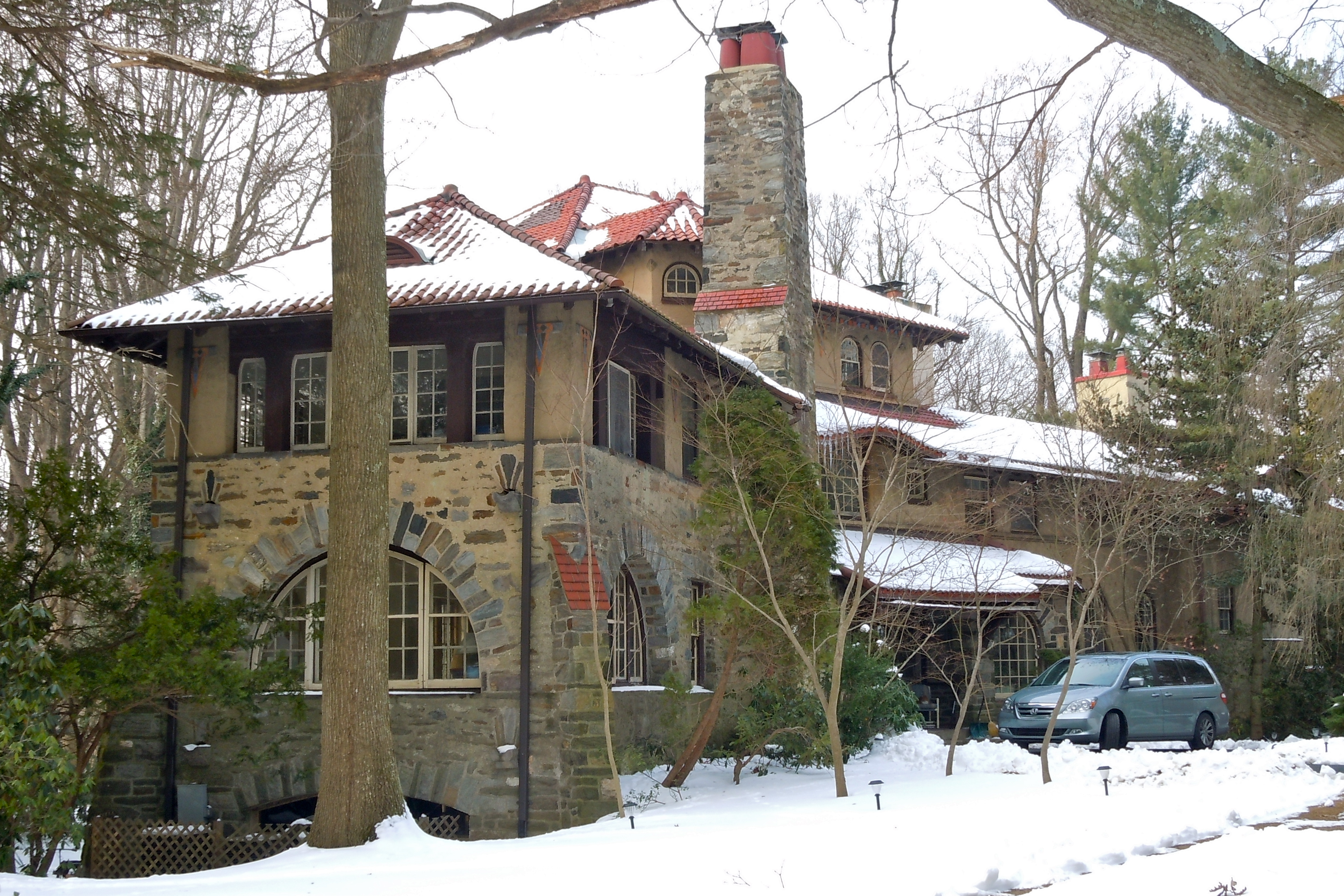
"Roylencroft," Rose Valley, PA (1909).

== See also ==
- Lightfoot Mill
