= Thunderbird Lodge (Rose Valley, Pennsylvania) =

Historic building in Pennsylvania, United States

- U.S. National Register of Historic Places
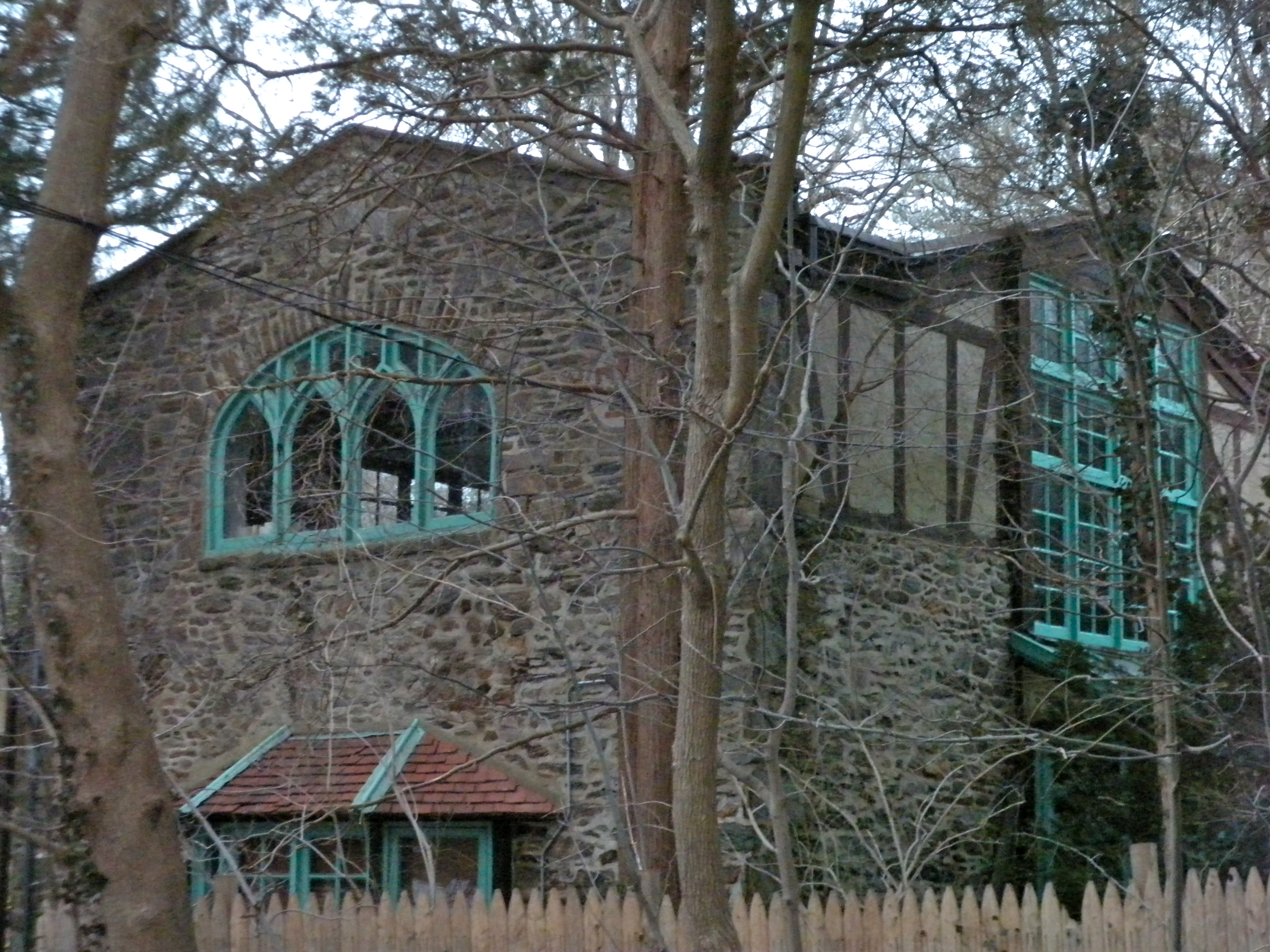
- The circa-1790 barn was converted into artist studios.

- Location within Pennsylvania Location within the United States
- Location: 41 Rose Valley Road; Rose Valley, Pennsylvania
- Coordinates: 39°53′55″N 75°23′17″W
- Area: 1.6 acres (0.65 ha)
- Built: 1790; 1904
- Architect: William Lightfoot Price
- Architectural style: Arts and Crafts Movement
- NRHP reference No.: 89001053
- Added to NRHP: August 18, 1989

Thunderbird Lodge is a building of historical and architectural significance in the utopian community of Rose Valley, Delaware County, Pennsylvania.

== Architect ==
In 1904, architect William Lightfoot Price converted an existing circa-1790 stone barn into studios for the artists Charles H. and Alice Barber Stephens. Appended to this, he designed a rambling fieldstone-and-stucco house, including a 3-story octagonal stair tower that joined the wings and served all five levels.

Price, a founder of Rose Valley, attempted to create a community of artists and artisans working side by side under the principles of the Arts and Crafts Movement. These included truth in the use of materials, traditional craftsmanship using simple forms, and often medieval, romantic or folk styles of decoration.

Price described the house:

"The old barn standing near the road was converted into first and second floor studios, the old timber roof being rebuilt for the upper studio, and large windows and fireplaces being built into the old walls. The house rambles off from the fireplace and off the studios and is connected to them by an octagonal stair hall. It is built in part of fieldstone so like that in the old barn that it is almost impossible to tell old work from new. The upper part is of warm gray plaster, and the roof of red tile. All of the detail is as simple and direct as possible, and the interior is finished in cypress stained to soft browns and grays and guilty of no finish other than wax or oil."

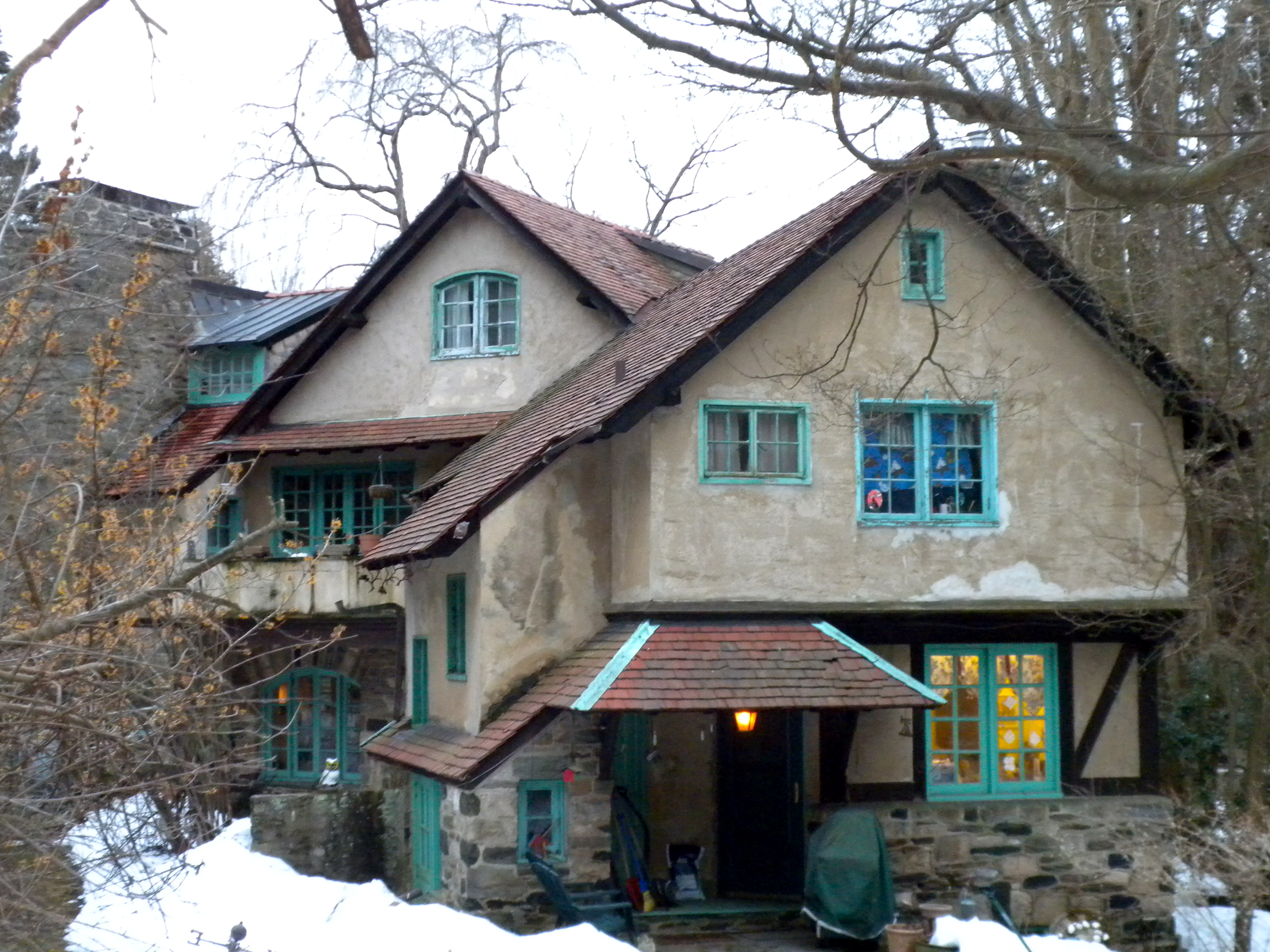
Thunderbird Lodge (kitchen entrance), from the west. The octagonal stair tower is at far left.

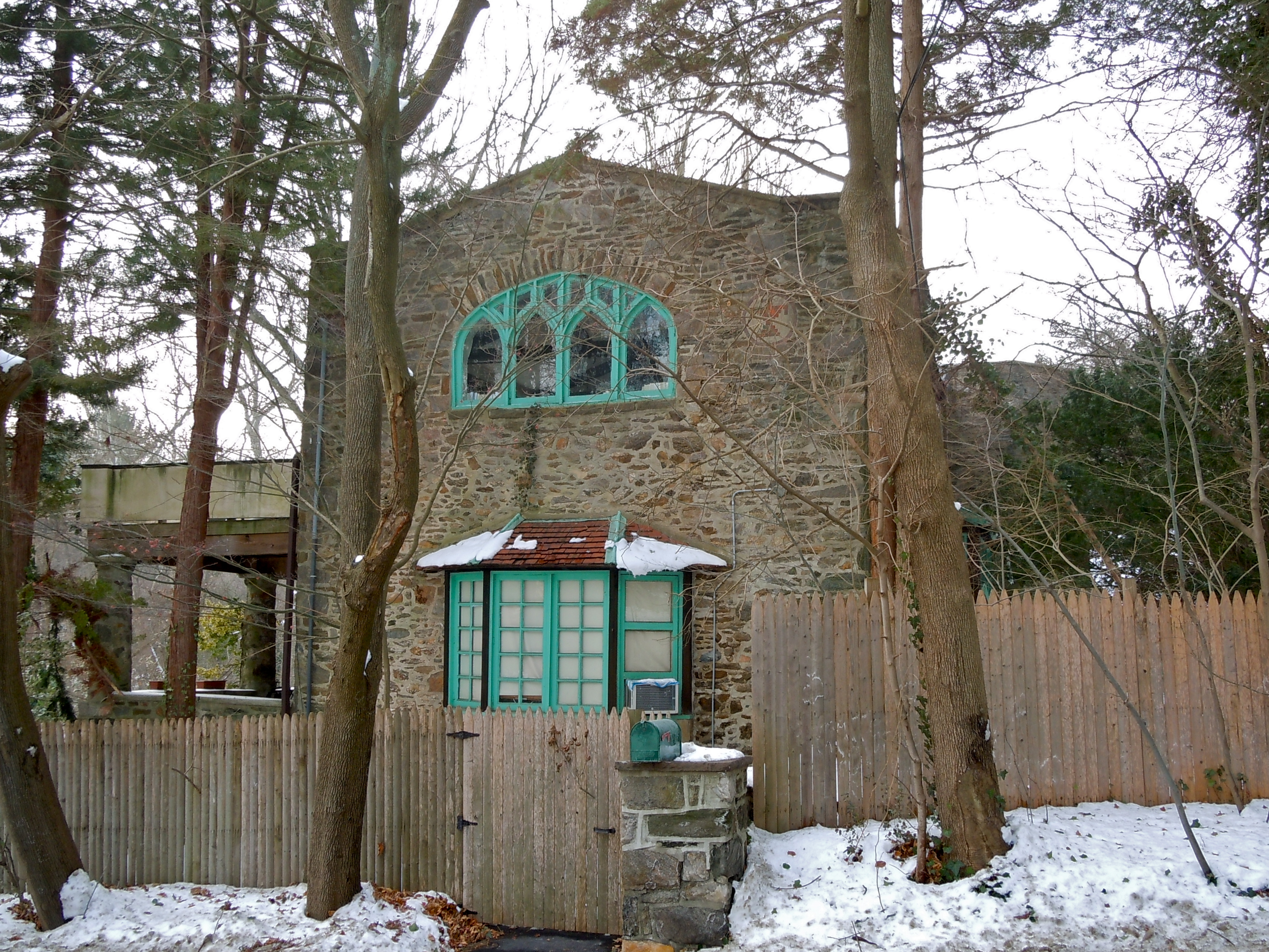
Thunderbird Lodge (studios), from Rose Valley Road.

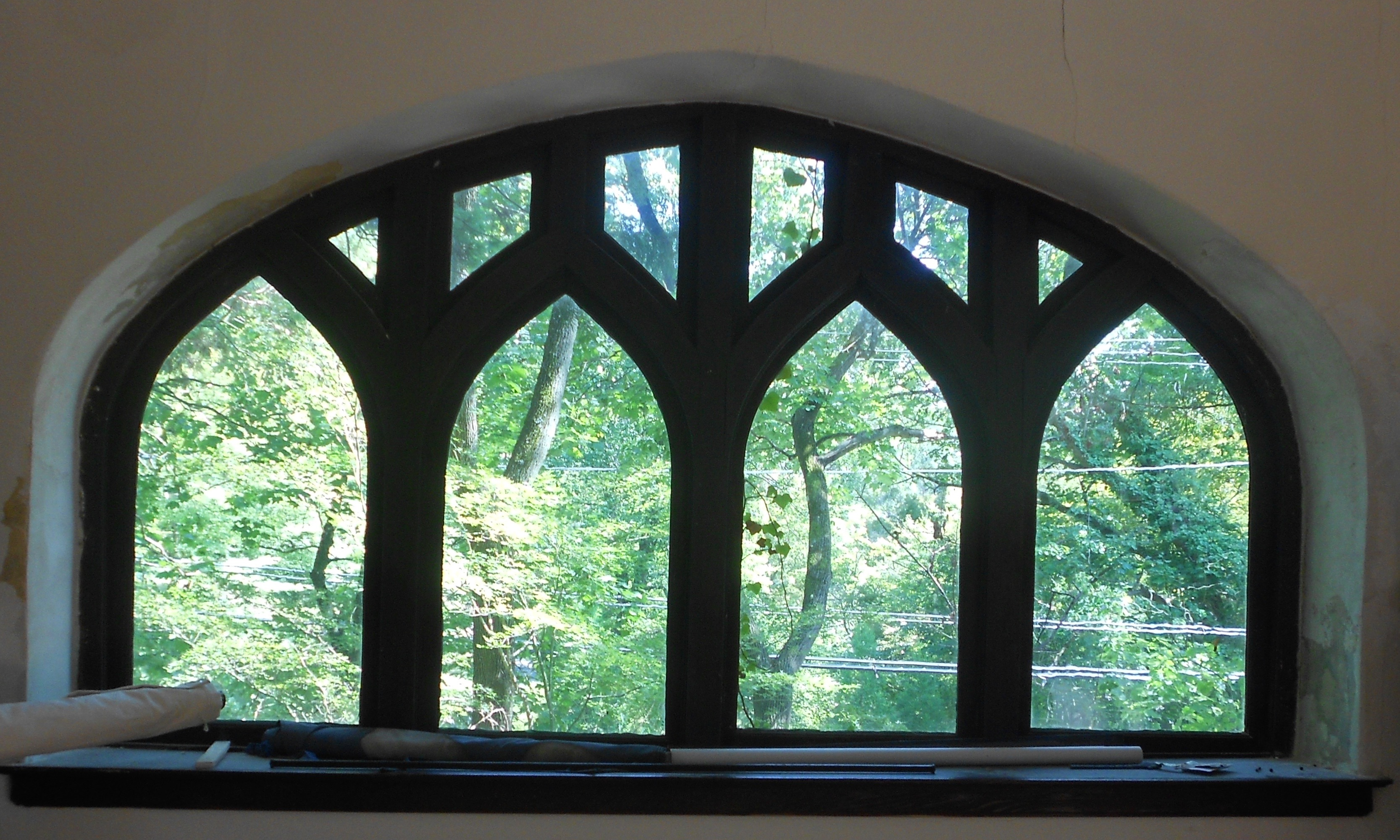
Window looking out toward Rose Valley Road

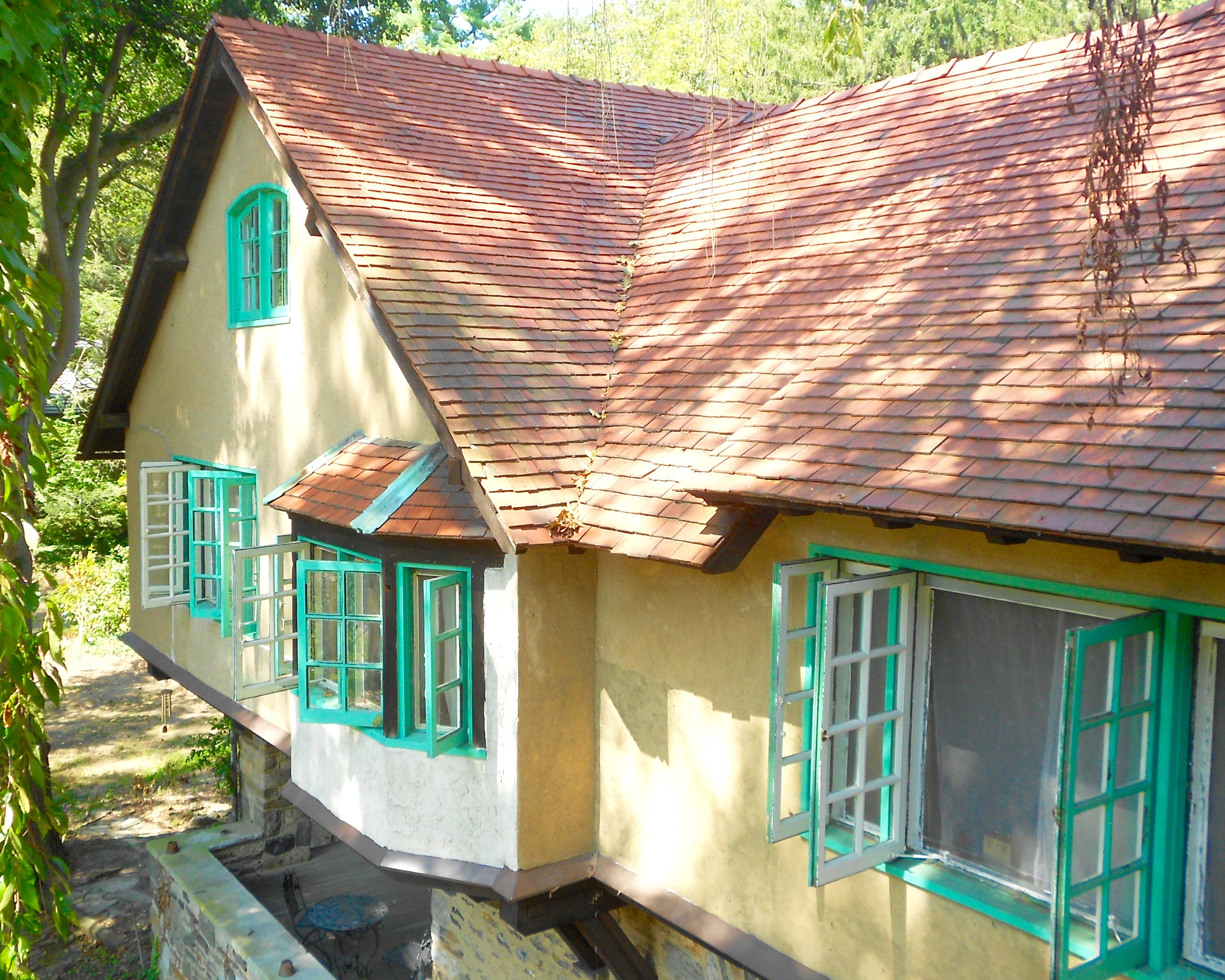
South elevation of west wing

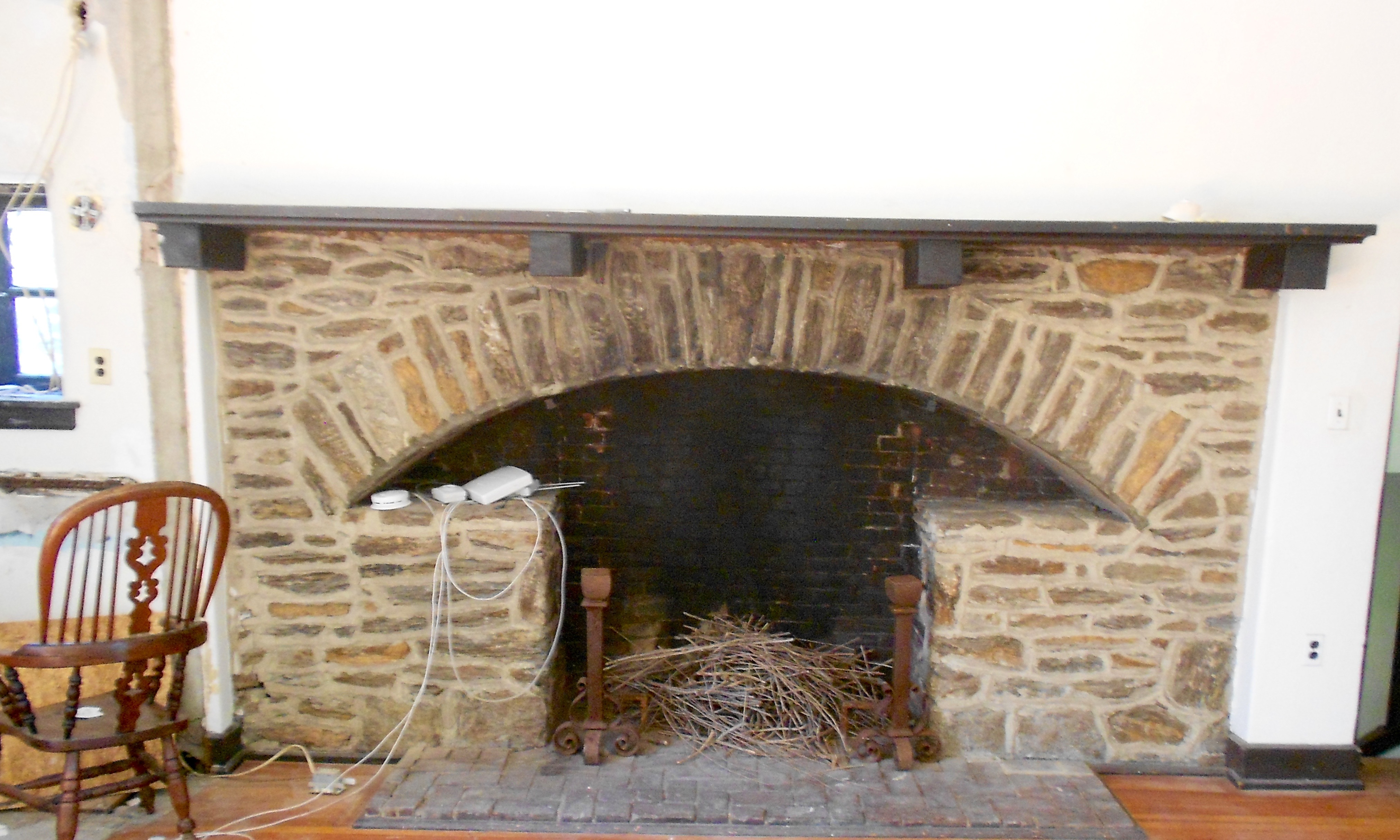
Fireplace in lower studio

== Artists and activists ==
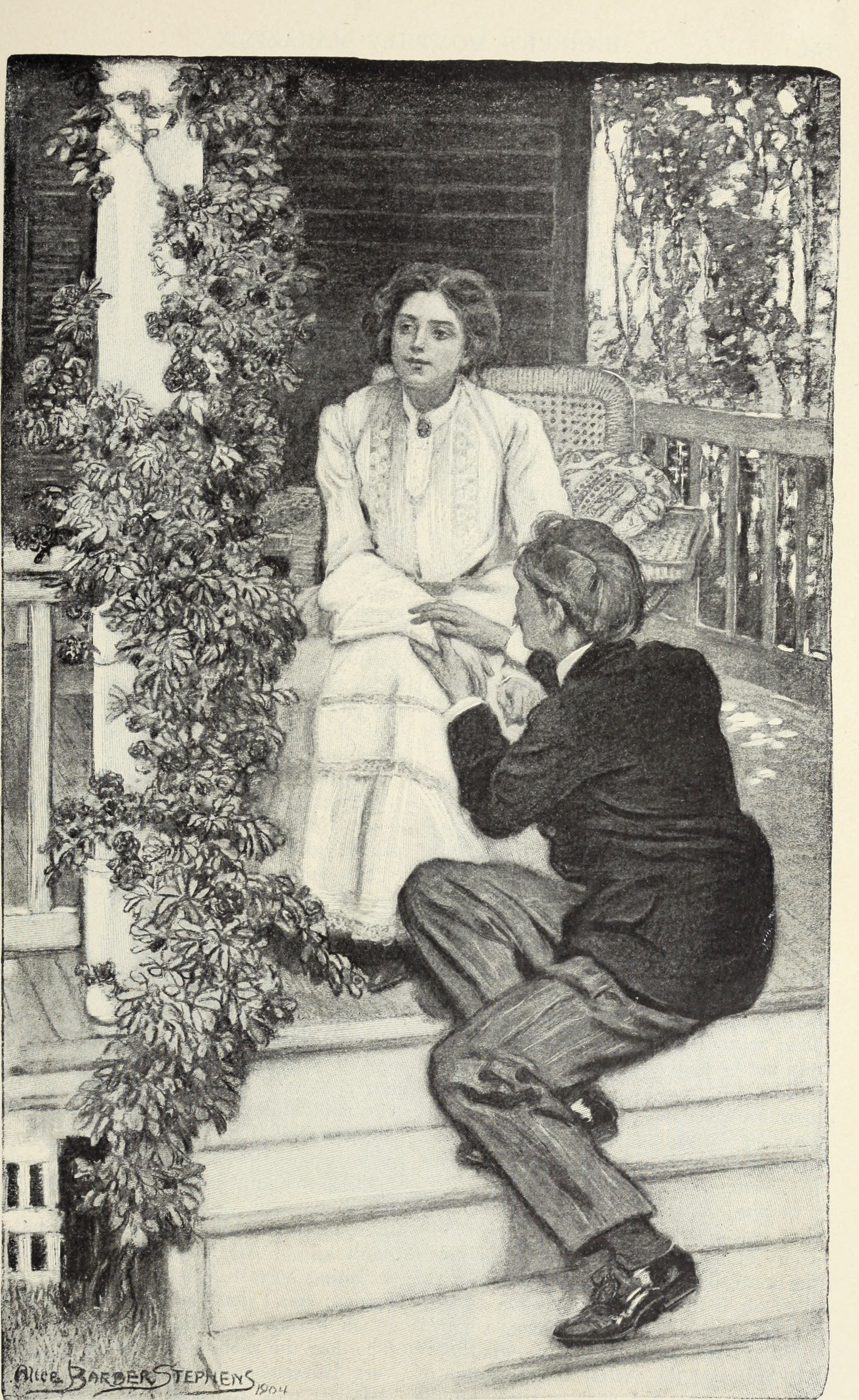
Illustration in Harper's Magazine, 1904, by Alice Barber Stephens

Charles H. Stephens (1864–1940) was an instructor at the Pennsylvania Academy of the Fine Arts in Philadelphia, Pennsylvania, and a painter of Native American subjects. He had lived among the Blackfeet, and amassed an extensive collection of artifacts. The fireplace that Price designed for his studio is in the silhouette of a Thunderbird, a symbol that also appears on the building's exterior in Henry Mercer’s Moravian tiles. Alice Barber Stephens (1858–1932) was a highly successful illustrator for magazines and children's books. They raised their son, D. Owen Stephens (1894–1937) in Rose Valley, and painted there until their deaths.

Thunderbird Lodge then became the home of a leading social activist couple, Allen Seymour Olmsted and Mildred Scott Olmsted. He was a lawyer, a member of the Men's Commission for Women's Suffrage, and helped in the founding of the American Civil Liberties Union. She worked with the American Birth Control League and was the longtime director of the U.S. section of the Women's International League for Peace and Freedom. Together they worked with the American Friends Service Committee, the National Association for the Advancement of Colored People, and many other liberal organizations. The house was used as a safe meeting place for other activists, including Jane Addams, James Farmer, George Washington Carver, and Martin Luther King Jr.

In September 2015 a Pennsylvania Historical and Museum Commission marker was dedicated to Mildred Scott Olmsted just north of the house.

Thunderbird Lodge was donated to the Rose Valley Centennial Foundation by the Olmsted family in 2015.

== Great Minquas Path ==
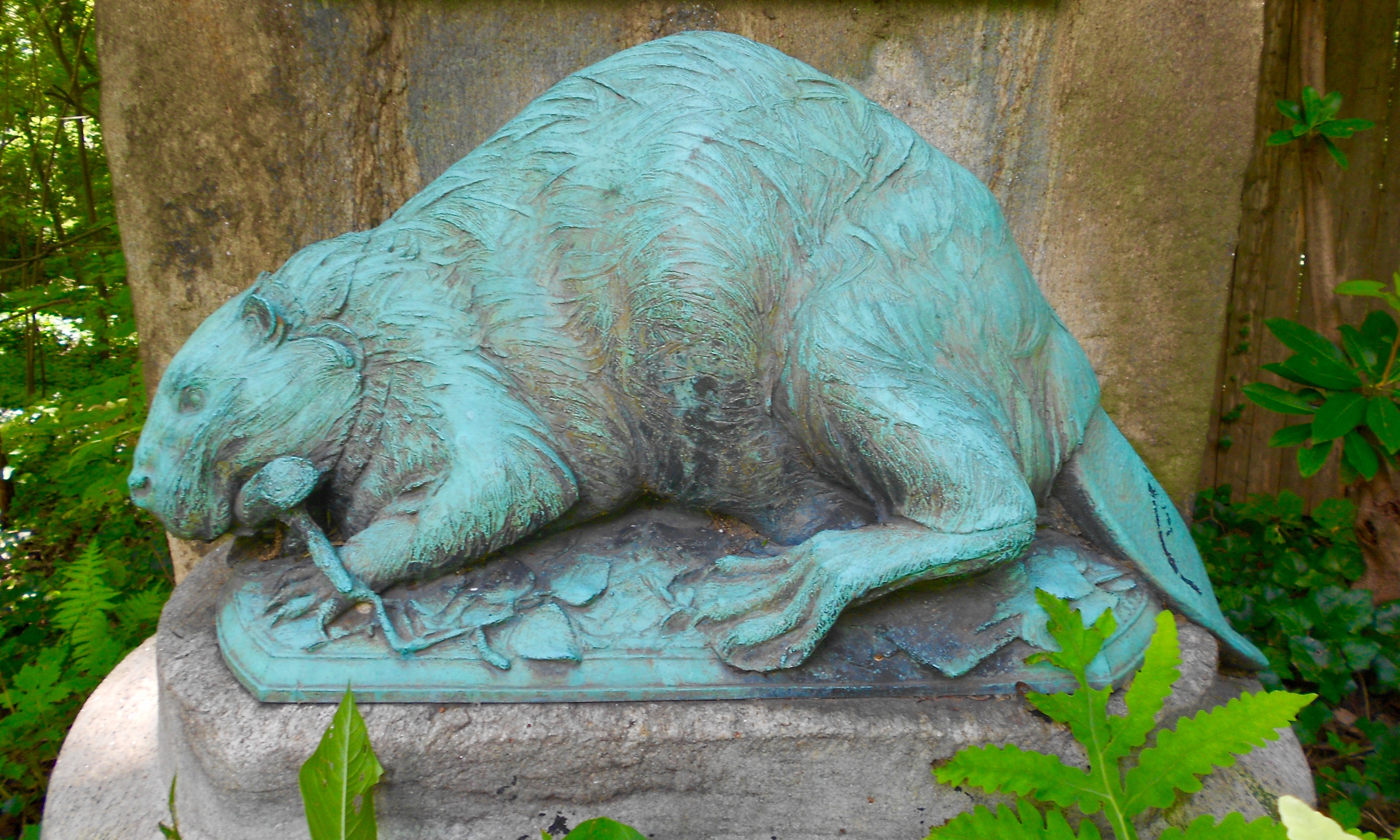
1926 Pennsylvania State Historical Marker on the property. The marker commemorates the Great Minquas Path, a Native American trading route dating to the 1600s.

At the edge of the property, along Rose Valley Road, is a 1926 Pennsylvania State historic marker, commemorating an important Native American trading route, the Great Minquas Path, that ran nearby. Charles Stephens designed the bas-relief on the marker, and Albert Laessle created the beaver sculpture below the plaque.

Thunderbird Lodge was added to the National Register of Historic Places in 1989, and is a contributing property in the Rose Valley Historic District, which was listed on the NRHP in 2010.
