= Walter Ferris Price =

American architect (1857–1951)

- Born: August 31, 1857; Swarthmore, Pennsylvania, US
- Died: May 22, 1951 (aged 63); Frankford, Pennsylvania, US
- Education: Haverford College, BA 1881 and MA 1882; Harvard University, MA 1884
- Occupation: Architect
- Practice: W. L. and F. L. Price Walter Ferris Price Price & Walton

Walter Ferris Price (August 31, 1857 – May 22, 1951) was an American architect. He was known as a designer and restorer of Quaker meeting houses. His brother was an architect William Lightfoot Price. He was also a co-founder and teacher of Haverford School in Haverford, Pennsylvania.

== Early life ==
Price was born on August 31, 1857 in Swarthmore, Pennsylvania. His parents were Sarah (née Lightfoot) and James Martin Price. His family was Quaker, descendeds from Quakers who were amongst the first to arrive in Pennsylvania. He spent his childhood in the Wallingford, Pennsylvania area.

Price went to the Westtown School and the Friends Select School. He then attended Haverford College, graduating with a bachelor's degree in classical studies in 1881 and a master's degree in classical studies in 1882.While at Haverford, he was a member of the varsity baseball and football teams.

Later, he went to Harvard University, receiving a Master of Arts degree in 1884.

== Career ==
Price and Isaac Sharpless founded the Haverford Grammar School in Haverford, Pennsylvania; Price taught classics there from 1884 to 1891. He became interested in Italian architecture after several trips to Europe and decided to change careers. Price went to Philadelphia where he studied architecture with Cope and Stewardson.

Price joined W. L. and F. L. Price, the architectural firm of his brothers, Francis "Frank" L. Price and William Lightfoot Price, working there for nearly ten years. By 1902, he formed his own practice. He received a commission for Haverford College. He also designed houses for Milton W. Young in the Overbrook neighborhood of Philadelphia, Pennsylvania.

Price formed the practice Price & Walton with his cousin William McKee Walton in 1923, continuing until 1935. He designed the Westtown School meetinghouse, which led to Price & Walton's commission for the Friend Meeting House on Florida Avenue in Washington, D.C., at the request of Lou Henry Hoover. Price became "authority on the design and restoration of Friends' meetinghouses".

Price also designed buildings for East Coast colleges, including Alumnae Hall at Mount Holyoke College, Haverford Union at Haverford College, and the Philips Memorial at West Chester State College. He also designed three hotels in Atlantic City, New Jersey, and many houses in the Philadelphia area.

Price was a member of the American Institute of Architects.

== Personal life ==
Price married Felicia Thomas of Philadelphia on December 8 1906. The couple purchased and remodeled a farmhouse in Rose Valley, Pennsylvania. In 1916, they moved to Moylan, Pennsylvania, where he designed a new house based on the farmhouse.

Price was a photographer and watercolorist. He collected a large library of art and photography books that he bound by hand. Price was a member of the Friends' Historical Society and the Welsh Society. He joined the T-Squared Club in 1892.

Price died in the Friends Hospital in Frankford, Pennsylvania on May 22, 1951, at the age of 93 years. He was buried in the Concord Friends Burial Ground in Concordville, Pennsylvania.
