= Media Armory =

- U.S. National Register of Historic Places
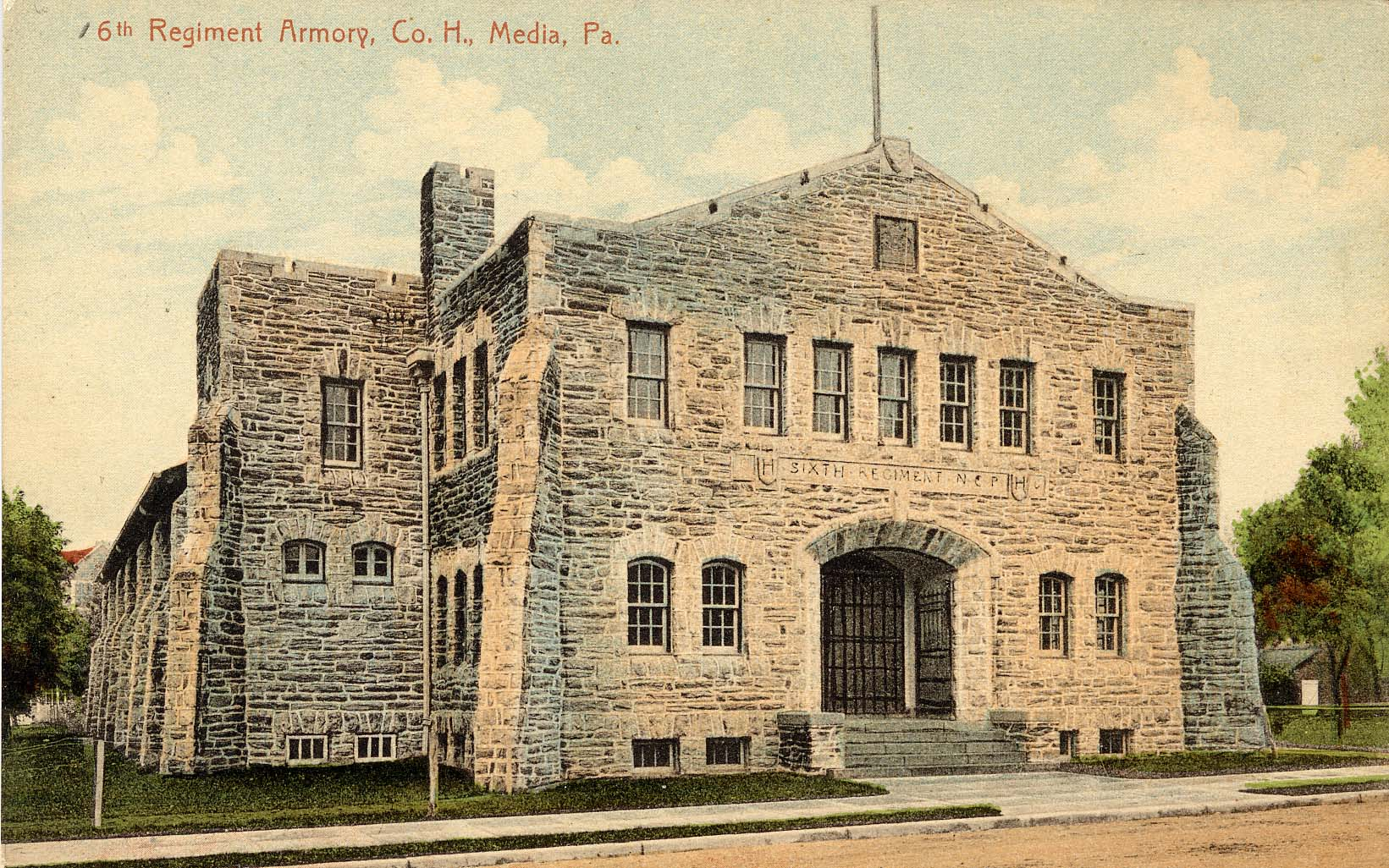
- 1909 postcard of the armory

- Location within Pennsylvania Location within the United States
- Location: 12 E. State St., Media, Pennsylvania
- Coordinates: 39°55′6″N 75°23′20″W
- Area: 0.4 acres (0.16 ha)
- Built: 1908
- Architects: Price & McLanahan
- Architectural style: Late Gothic Revival
- MPS: Pennsylvania National Guard Armories MPS
- NRHP reference No.: 89002077
- Added to NRHP: December 22, 1989

The Media Armory, is a historic National Guard Armory located in Media, Delaware County, Pennsylvania built in 1908 for Company H of the 6th Infantry Regiment of the Pennsylvania National Guard.

== History ==
The original building was designed by William Lightfoot Price and M H. McLanahan in 1908 as the Armory for Company H of the 6th Infantry Regiment of the Pennsylvania National Guard. The 2 story structure is primarily constructed of stone and steel and has a basement. The "structure's intended military use is expressed by its heavily buttressed walls, broken battlements, and low flanking towers," according to a plaque affixed to the building by the Media Borough Council in 1984. Company H served in Mexican Border Expedition, and re-designated as Company H, 111th Infantry, 28th Infantry Division, in France in World War I, and as Company M, in the South Pacific in World War II.

The armory was added to the National Register of Historic Places on December 22, 1989.

The entire building was renovated and restored in 2004. The upper level was converted to retail space and is currently occupied by the grocery store chain Trader Joe's. Solar panels were added on the roof at that time.

== Pennsylvania Veterans Museum ==
The Pennsylvania Veterans Museum opened in 2005 on Veterans Day in the basement level of the building. Exhibits include dioramas of the D-Day invasion and the Korean War, a mini-movie theater, military uniforms, weapons, photographs and oral histories of veterans' experiences.

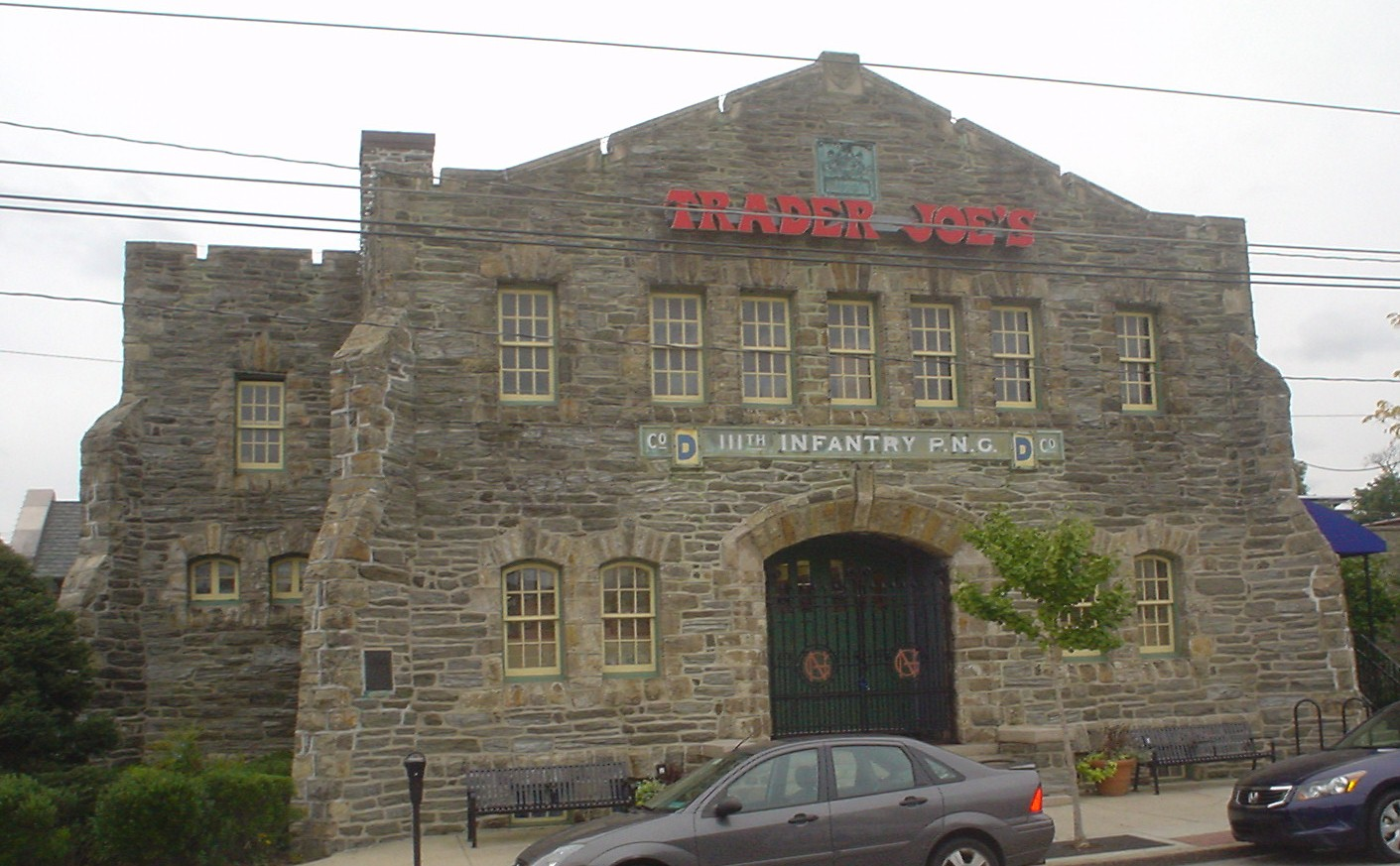
Armory in 2009

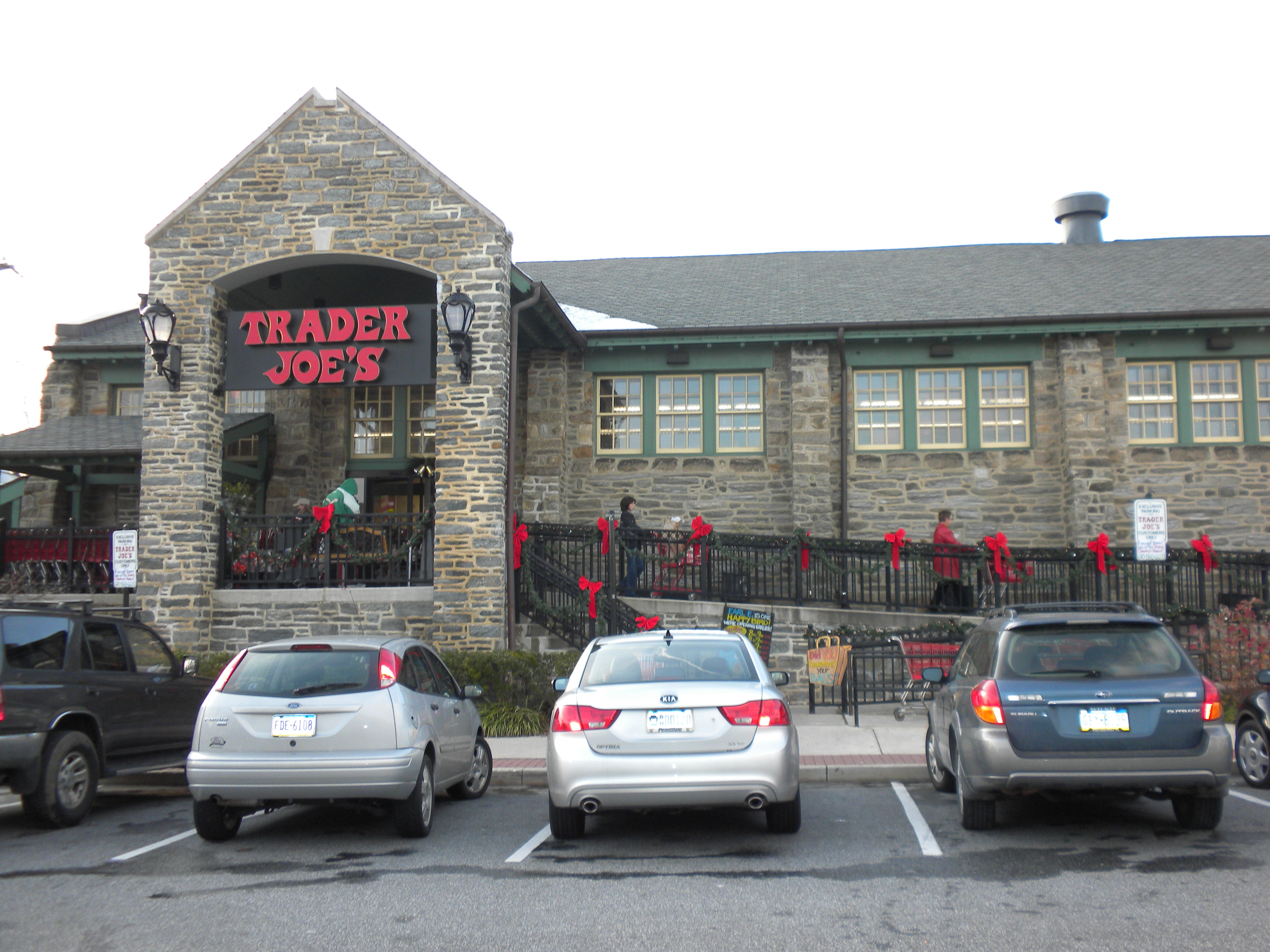
Trader Joe's entrance

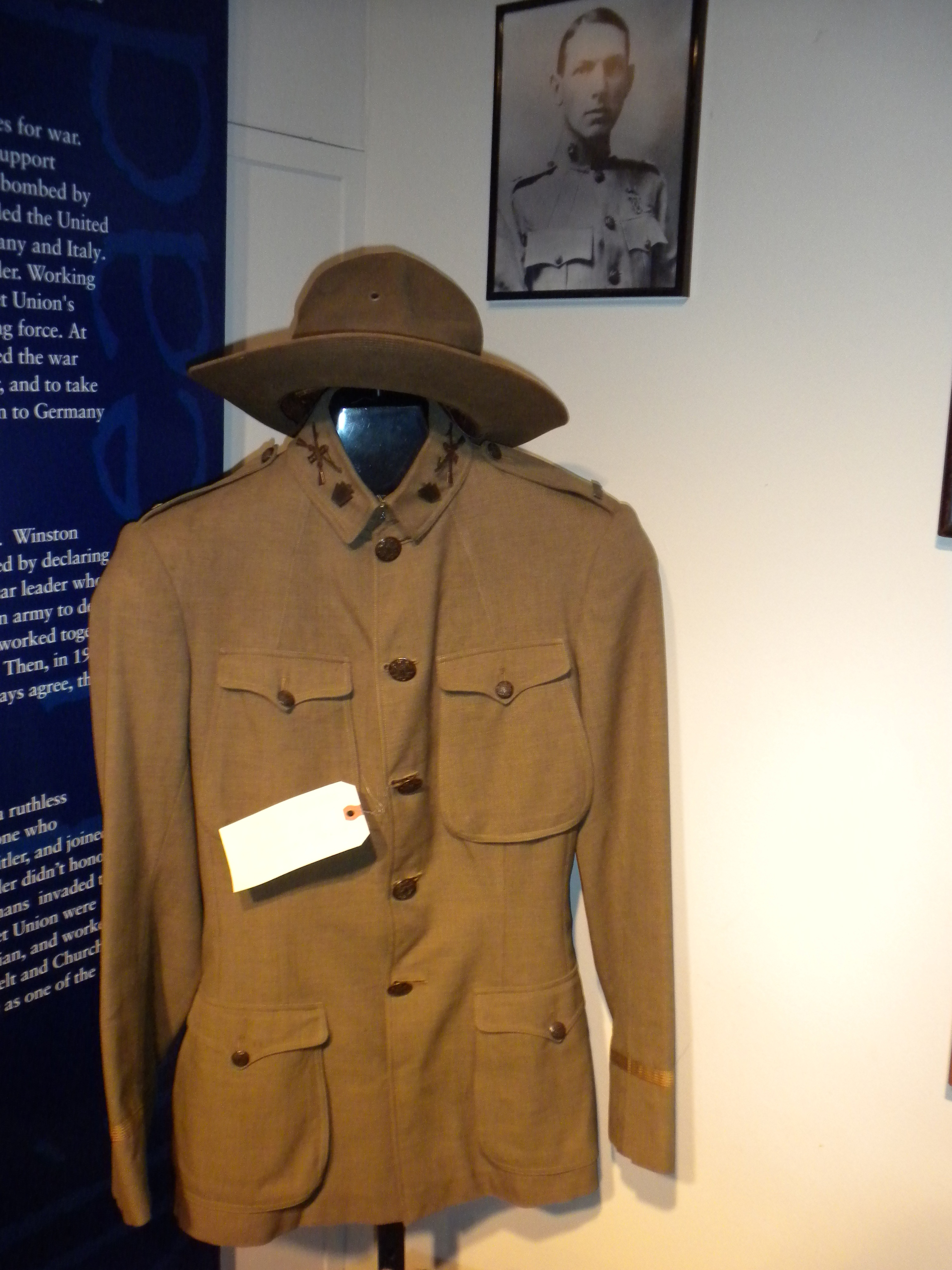
Uniform of Lt. Henry Saultier on display at the Pennsylvania Veterans Museum. Lt. Saultier served from 1904-1914 in the 111th Infantry, 6th Regiment, Company H of the Pennsylvania National Guard, which trained in the armory.

== See also ==
- National Register of Historic Places listings in Delaware County, Pennsylvania
