= Kenilworth Inn =

- U.S. National Register of Historic Places
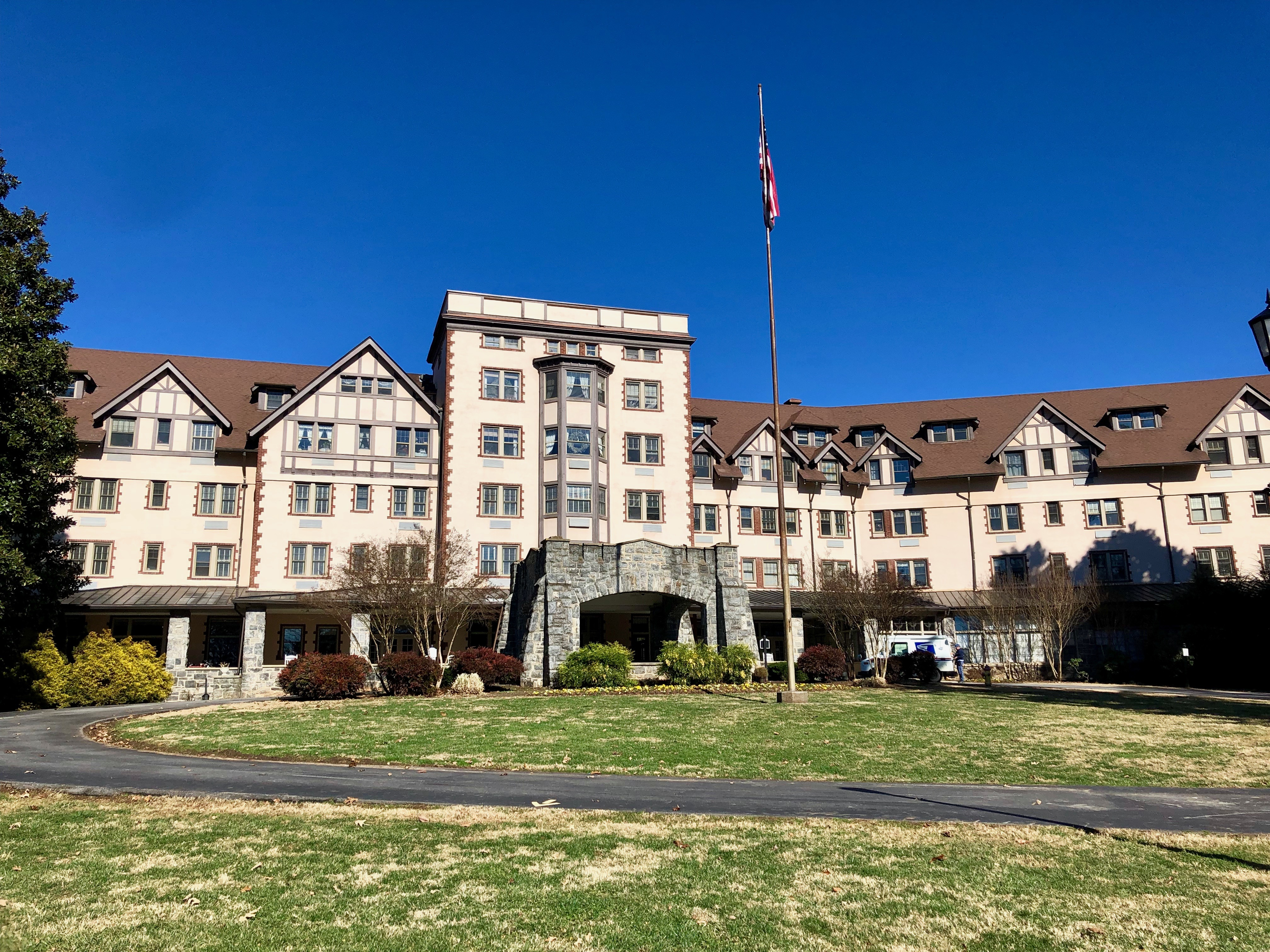
- Kenilworth Inn, January 2019

- Location within North Carolina Location within the United States
- Location: 60 Caledonia Rd., Asheville, North Carolina
- Coordinates: 35°34′20″N 82°32′27″W
- Built: 1918
- Architect: Ronald Greene; Carolina Wood Products
- Architectural style: Tudor Revival
- NRHP reference No.: 01001423
- Added to NRHP: December 31, 2001

Kenilworth Inn is a large Tudor Revival building located in Asheville, North Carolina. Originally designed to replace an earlier hotel, it became a military hospital as soon as it was built. As it changed hands, it was used as a mental hospital, hotel, and other purposes until 2000, when it became an apartment building. It is listed on the National Register of Historic Places.
