= Ann Harding =

American actress (1902–1981)

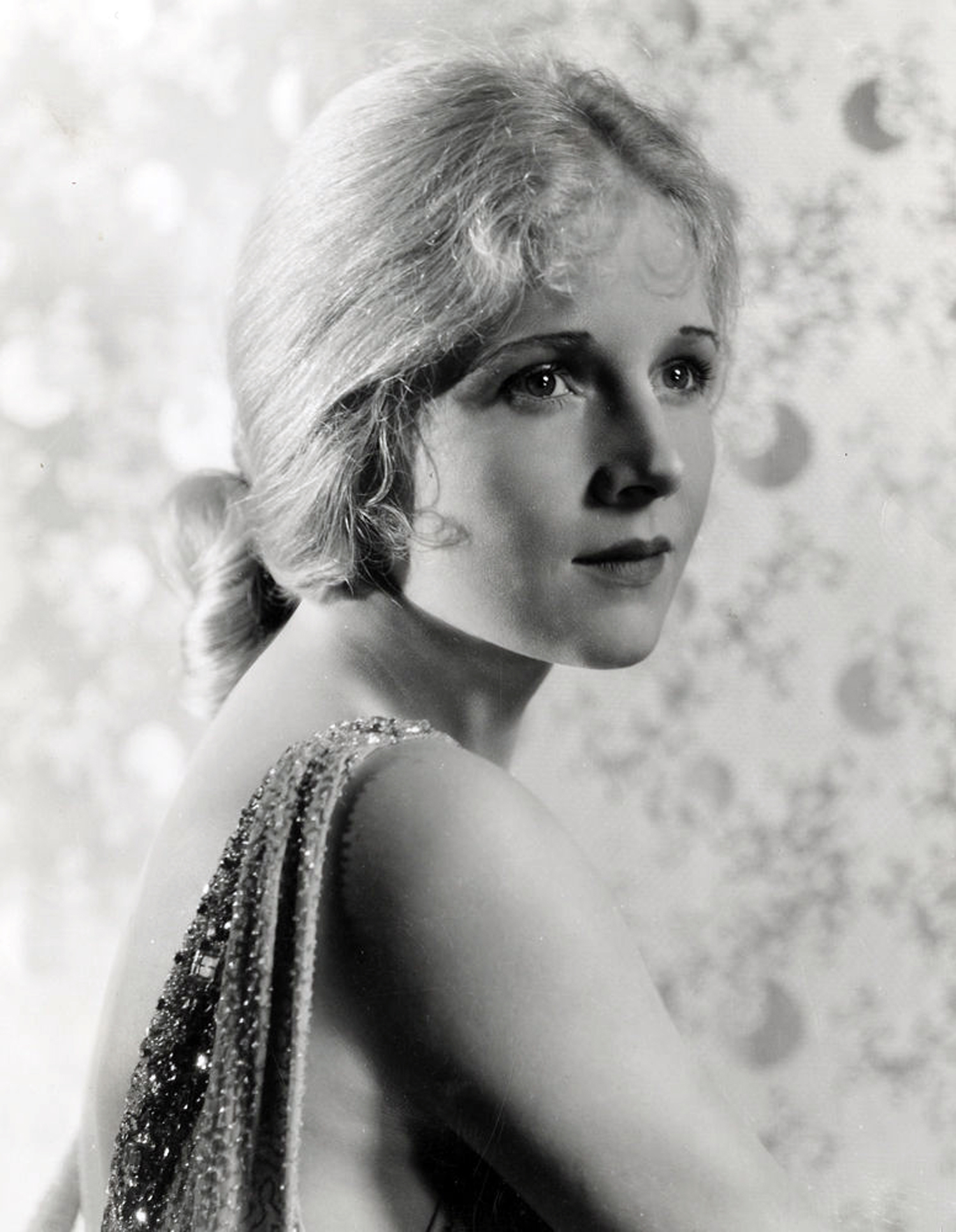
- Harding in 1930
- Born: Dorothy Walton Gatley; August 7, 1902; San Antonio, Texas, U.S.
- Died: September 1, 1981 (aged 79); Los Angeles, California, U.S.
- Resting place: Forest Lawn Memorial Park, Los Angeles, California, U.S.
- Occupation: Actress
- Years active: 1921–1965
- Spouses: Harry Bannister (m. 1926; div. 1932) Werner Janssen (m. 1937; div. 1963)
- Children: 1

Ann Harding (born Dorothy Walton Gatley; August 7, 1902 – September 1, 1981) was an American theatre, motion picture, radio, and television actress. Harding was a regular on Broadway and on tour in the 1920s. In the 1930s, Harding was one of the first actresses to gain fame in the new medium of "talking pictures," and she was nominated for the Academy Award for Best Actress in 1931 for her work in Holiday.

Harding was born Dorothy Walton Gatley and was the daughter of a prominent United States Army officer. She was raised primarily in East Orange, New Jersey and graduated from East Orange High School. Having gained her initial acting experience in school drama classes, she decided on a career as an actress and moved across the Hudson River to New York City. Due to her father's opposition to her career choice, she adopted the stage name Ann Harding.

After initial work as a script reader, Harding began to win roles on Broadway and in small semiprofessional theaters, primarily in Pennsylvania. Around the late 1920s she moved to California to begin working in motion pictures, which were just beginning to include sound.

Her work in plays had given her notable diction and stage presence, and she was quickly tapped for leading lady roles. By the late 1930s, she was becoming stereotyped as the beautiful, innocent, self-sacrificing woman, and film work became harder for her to obtain. After marrying conductor Werner Janssen in 1937, she worked only sporadically, with three notable roles coming in Eyes in the Night (1942), It Happened on Fifth Avenue (1947) and The Man in the Gray Flannel Suit (1956).

She worked occasionally in television between 1955 and 1965, and she appeared in two plays in the early 1960s, returning to the stage after an absence of over 30 years, including the lead in The Corn is Green in 1964 at the Studio Theater in Buffalo, New York.

After her 1965 retirement, she resided in Sherman Oaks, California, where she died in 1981. Harding was interred at Forest Lawn Memorial Park in the Hollywood Hills.

== Early years ==
Harding was born Dorothy Walton Gatley at Fort Sam Houston in San Antonio, Texas to George G. Gatley, a career army officer, and Elizabeth "Bessie" Walton (Crabb) Gatley. After travelling often during her early life because of her father's military career, she grew up in East Orange, New Jersey, graduated from East Orange High School, and attended Bryn Mawr College. Her father "violently opposed her profession," so Harding changed her name when she began her acting career.

== Career ==
Harding initially desired a business career and accepted a secretarial position with the Metropolitan Life Insurance Company. Her work included dictating letters, and upon discovering that the company's best typists would claim the best Dictaphone recordings so they could produce the most accurate letters, Harding worked to develop tone, cadence, and diction that would produce easy to understand recordings. Her success with the Dictaphone led to work as a script analyst, which required her to review plays and movie scripts and provide recorded oral summaries. These recordings led to acting work, and she made her Broadway debut in Like a King in 1921. Three years later she found her "home theater" in Rose Valley, Pennsylvania, after being directed by Hedgerow Theatre founder Jasper Deeter in The Master Builder. Over the years she returned to Hedgerow to reprise several of her roles. She was a prominent actress in Pittsburgh theatre for a time, performing with the Sharp Company and later starting the Nixon Players with Harry Bannister. In 1931, she purchased the Hedgerow Theatre building from Deeter for $5,000 and donated it to the company.

In 1929, she made her film debut in Paris Bound, opposite Fredric March. With talking pictures becoming the standard, producers and directors discovered that Harding's diction and pace of speech worked well with the new sound recording technology, and she soon became a leading lady. Harding's performances were often heralded by critics, who cited her stage experience for enabling her to give her characters depth.

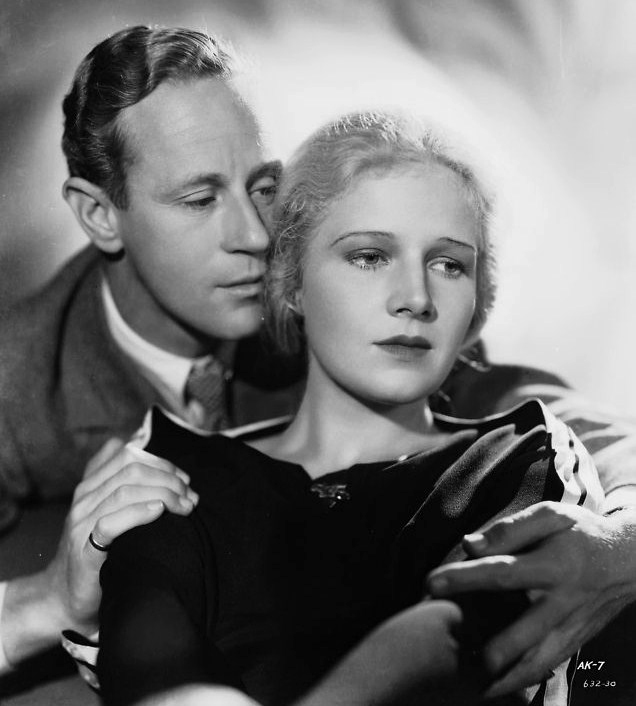
Leslie Howard and Ann Harding in The Animal Kingdom, 1932

First under contract to Pathé, which was subsequently absorbed by RKO Pictures, Harding was promoted as the studio's 'answer' to Metro-Goldwyn-Mayer's superstar Norma Shearer. She co-starred with Ronald Colman, Laurence Olivier, Myrna Loy, Herbert Marshall, Leslie Howard, Richard Dix, and Gary Cooper, and was often on loan to other studios, such as MGM and Paramount. At RKO, Harding, along with Helen Twelvetrees and Constance Bennett, comprised a trio who specialized in the "women's pictures" genre. She soon became a leading lady; she kept in shape by using the services of Sylvia of Hollywood.

In Harding's second film, Her Private Affair, she portrayed a wife of questionable morality, and the film was a commercial success. During this period, she was generally considered to be one of cinema's most beautiful actresses, with her waist-length blonde hair being one of her most noted physical attributes. Films during her peak include The Animal Kingdom, Peter Ibbetson, When Ladies Meet, The Flame Within, and Biography of a Bachelor Girl. Harding, however, eventually became stereotyped as the innocent, self-sacrificing young woman. Following lukewarm responses by both critics and the public to several of her later 1930s films, she eventually stopped making movies after she married the conductor Werner Janssen in 1937. She returned to the big screen in 1942 to make Eyes in the Night and to take secondary roles in other films. She played "Mary," the estranged wife of Charlie Ruggles, in the Christmas film It Happened on Fifth Avenue in 1947. In 1956, she again starred with Fredric March in The Man in the Gray Flannel Suit.

The 1960s marked Harding's return to Broadway after an absence of decades—having last appeared in 1927. In 1962, she starred in General Seeger, directed by and co-starring George C. Scott, and in 1964 she appeared in Abraham Cochrane ("her last New York stage appearance"). Both productions had brief runs, with the former play lasting a mere three performances (including previews). Harding made her final acting performance in 1965 in an episode of television's Ben Casey before retiring.

== Personal life ==
Harding was married twice, her husbands being:

- Harry Bannister, an actor. They married in 1926 and divorced in 1932 in Reno, Nevada. A New York Times article (May 8, 1932) about the divorce stated that the actress still loved her husband and only agreed to a divorce to help Bannister's stymied career. "The proceedings were among the most unusual in the history of Nevada's liberal divorce laws," the newspaper reported. "Only through dissolution of their marriage could he escape, they said, from being overshadowed by Miss Harding's rise to stardom." The divorce also resulted in what was described as "a bitter court fight ... over custody of their daughter", Jane Harding (1928–2005, married name Jane Otto). According to an interview with Harding's biographer, Scott O'Brien, Jane Harding said, "I had a terrible childhood. I hated my nurse. I never saw mother. She was always busy."
- Werner Janssen, the conductor. Harding and Janssen married in 1937 and divorced in 1963, with Harding claiming that her husband had controlled her throughout their marriage, keeping her from her friends and isolating her from the world. By this marriage, Harding had two stepchildren, Alice and Werner Jr.

Among Harding's romances was the novelist and screenwriter Gene Fowler. In the early 1960s, Harding began living with Grace Kaye, an adult companion, later known as Grace Kaye Harding. Ann Harding referred to Kaye as her daughter.

Harding campaigned for the reelection of President Herbert Hoover in 1932.

== Death ==
On September 1, 1981, Harding died at the age of 79 in Sherman Oaks, California.

She was survived by a daughter, named Jane Otto, and four grandchildren.

== Recognition ==
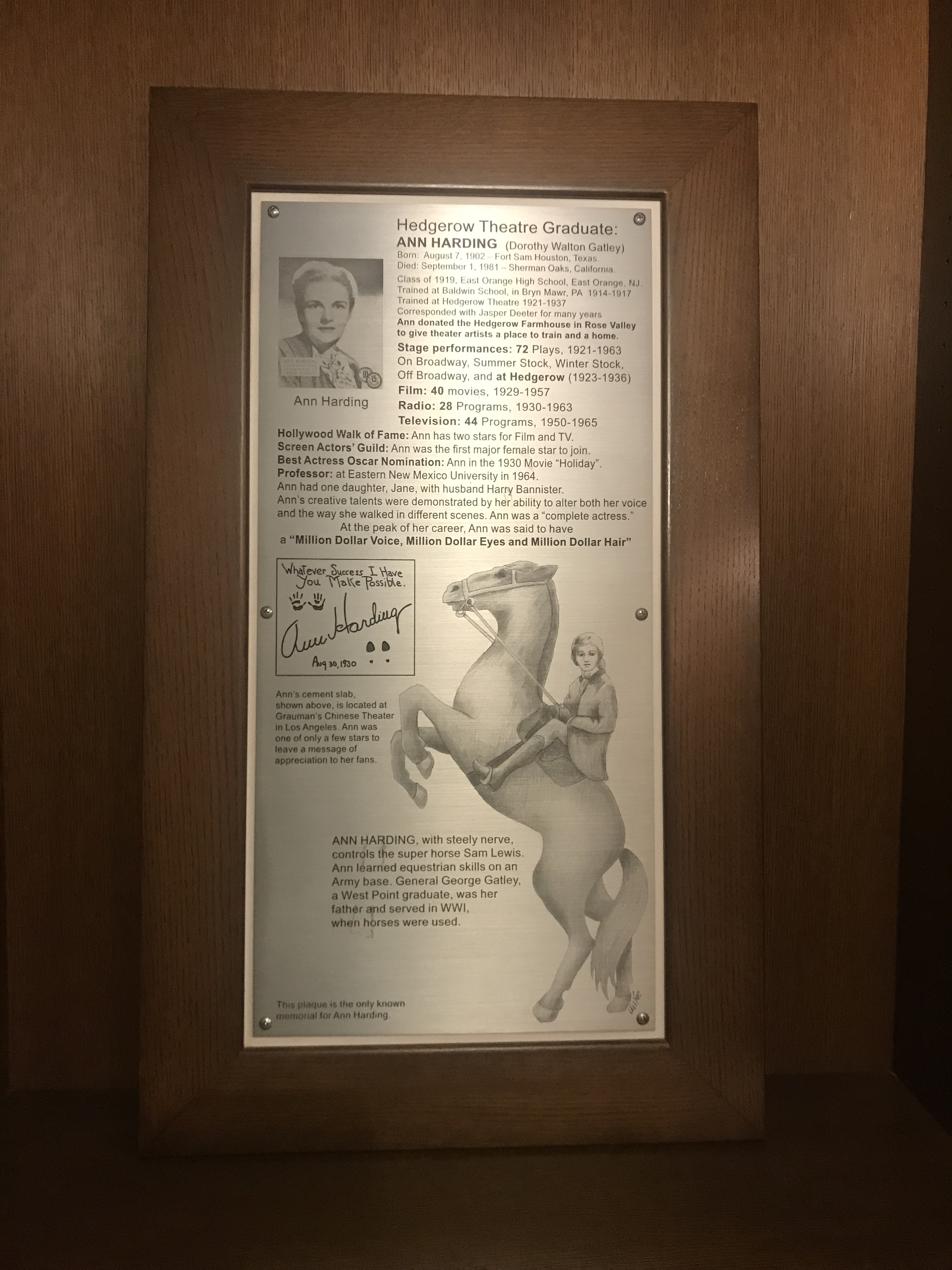
A plaque memorializing Ann Harding, photographed inside Hedgerow Theatre on October 7, 2023.

Harding was honored with a block in the forecourt of Grauman's Chinese Theatre on August 30th, 1930.

Harding was nominated for the Academy Award for Best Actress for Holiday in 1931.

For her contributions to the motion picture and television industries, Harding has two stars on the Hollywood Walk of Fame—one in the Motion Pictures section at 6201 Hollywood Boulevard and one in the Television section at 6850 Hollywood Boulevard. The ceremony for both stars was held on February 8, 1960.

As of October 7, 2023, there is a plaque memorializing Ann Harding inside Hedgerow Theatre.

== Broadway stage credits ==
Date	Production	Role
October 3, 1921 – Oct 1921	Like a King	Phyllis Weston
October 1, 1923 – May 1924	Tarnish	Letitia Tevis
September 8, 1924 – September 1924	Thoroughbreds	Sue
October 7, 1925 – December 1925	Stolen Fruit	Marie Millais
March 23, 1926 – April 1926	Schweiger	Anna Schweiger
September 28, 1926 – March 1927	The Woman Disputed	Marie-Ange
September 19, 1927 – October 1927	The Trial of Mary Dugan	Mary Dugan
February 28, 1962 – March 1, 1962	General Seeger	Rena Seeger
February 17, 1964 – February 17, 1964	Abraham Cochrane	Myra Holliday

== Filmography ==
=== Films ===
Year	Film	Role	Notes
1929	Paris Bound	Mary Hutton	
1929	Her Private Affair	Vera Kessler	Co-starred Harry Bannister
1929	Condemned	Madame Vidal	US reissue title: Condemned to Devil's Island, Co-starred Ronald Colman
1930	Holiday	Linda Seton	Nominated – Academy Award for Best Actress
1930	The Girl of the Golden West	Minnie	
1931	East Lynne	Lady Isabella	The film was nominated for a Best Picture Oscar
1931	Devotion	Shirley Mortimer	co-star Leslie Howard
1932	Prestige	Therese Du Flos Verlaine	
1932	Westward Passage	Olivia Van Tyne Allen Ottendorf	Co-starred Laurence Olivier
1932	The Conquerors	Caroline Ogden Standish	US reissue title: Pioneer Builders
1932	The Animal Kingdom	Daisy Sage	UK Title: The Woman in His House, Co-starred Leslie Howard
1933	When Ladies Meet	Claire Woodruff	Co-starred Myrna Loy
1933	Double Harness	Joan Colby	Co-starred William Powell
1933	The Right to Romance	Dr. Margaret "Peggy" Simmons	Co-starred Robert Young
1934	Gallant Lady	Sally Wyndham	
1934	The Life of Vergie Winters	Vergie Winters aka Virginia Wood	
1934	The Fountain	Julie von Marwitz	
1934	The Hollywood Gad About	Herself	Short subject
1935	Biography of a Bachelor Girl	Marion Forsythe	
1935	Enchanted April	Mrs. Lotty Wilkins	
1935	The Flame Within	Doctor Mary White	
1935	Peter Ibbetson	Mary, Duchess of Towers	Co-starred Gary Cooper
1936	The Lady Consents	Anne Talbot	
1936	The Witness Chair	Paula Young	
1937	Love from a Stranger	Carol Howard	US title: A Night of Terror, Co-starred Basil Rathbone
1942	Eyes in the Night	Norma Lawry	Starred Edward Arnold
1943	Mission to Moscow	Mrs. Marjorie Davies	
1943	The North Star	Sophia Pavlova	US recut version: Armored Attack
1944	Nine Girls	Gracie Thornton	
1944	Janie	Lucille Conway	
1945	Those Endearing Young Charms	Mrs. Brandt (Captain)	
1946	Janie Gets Married	Lucille Conway	
1947	It Happened on 5th Avenue	Mary O'Connor	
1947	Christmas Eve	Aunt Matilda Reed	US reissue title: Sinner's Holiday
1950	The Magnificent Yankee	Fanny Bowditch Holmes	Co-starred Louis Calhern
1950	Two Weeks with Love	Katherine Robinson	
1951	The Unknown Man	Stella Mason	US title: The Bradley Mason Story
1956	The Man in the Gray Flannel Suit	Helen Hopkins	Starred Gregory Peck and Jennifer Jones
1956	I've Lived Before	Miss Jane Stone	
1956	Strange Intruder	Mary Carmichael	

=== Television ===
Year	Title	Role	Notes
1955	Crossroads	Hulda Lund	Season 1 Episode 4: "With All My Love"
1955	Studio 57	Martha Halstead	Season 2 Episode 9: "Vacation with Pay"
1956	Front Row Center	Grammie	Season 2 Episode 2: "Strange Suspicion"
1956	G.E. Summer Originals		Season 1 Episode 9: "Great Lady"
1959	The DuPont Show with June Allyson	Naomi	Season 1 Episode 1: "Ruth and Naomi"
1961	Alfred Hitchcock Presents	Sarah Hale	Season 7 Episode 12: "A Jury of Her Peers"
1963	The Defenders	Helen Bernard	Season 2 Episode 28: "A Taste for Vengeance"
1963	Burke's Law	Annabelle Rogers	Season 1 Episode 2: "Who Killed Mr. X?"
1964	Dr. Kildare	Mae Priest	Season 3 Episode 18: "Never Too Old for the Circus"
1965	Ben Casey	Edith Sommers	Season 5 Episode 5: "Because of the Needle, the Haystack was Lost"
