= Framed (1930 film) =

1930 film

- Directed by: George Archainbaud
- Written by: Paul Schofield (story); Wallace Smith (dialogue)
- Produced by: Henry Hobart (associate producer); William LeBaron (producer)
- Starring: Evelyn Brent; William Holden; Regis Toomey; Ralf Harolde
- Cinematography: Leo Tover
- Edited by: Jack Kitchin
- Distributed by: RKO Radio Pictures
- Release date: March 16, 1930 (US)
- Running time: 62 minutes
- Country: United States
- Language: English

Framed is a 1930 American pre-Code crime action film, directed by George Archainbaud, based on a screenplay by Paul Schofield and Wallace Smith. It starred Evelyn Brent, William Holden (no relation to the Oscar-winning actor, William Holden), Regis Toomey, and Ralf Harolde.

== Plot ==
Framed (1930)

When Rose Manning's father is killed during a robbery by one of Inspector McArthur’s officers, Manning vows to avenge his death. Five years elapse, and Rose is now the hostess of a nightclub, and her liquor supplier, the bootlegger Chuck Gaines is interested in her. Still plotting her revenge, she meets young Jimmy, who she does not realize is the son of the inspector. Spurning Gaines' advances, Rose becomes romantically involved with Jimmy. Her motivations waver as her emotional attachment to the young McArthur grows, until her relationship takes precedence over her revenge.

Chuck, jealous of the growing relationship between Rose and Jimmy, plots with his cohort, Bing Murdock, to murder Jimmy. Uncovering the plan, Rose manages to warn Jimmy and hides him away in her apartment. Gaines discovers this and goes to kill Jimmy himself. Jimmy manages to get the upper hand and kills Gaines. Rose makes him leave before he is caught by Bing or the police. Bing arrives at the apartment after attempting to kill the inspector but killing another officer instead. He wants to use Rose as his alibi. Rose betrays him and blames him for the killing of Gaines. Jimmy admits everything to his father. When the inspector finally realizes that what Rose and Jimmy have is real affection for one another, he removes any objections over their relationship.

== Cast ==
- Evelyn Brent as Rose Manning
- Regis Toomey as Jimmy McArthur
- Ralf Harolde as Chuck Gaines
- William Holden as Inspector 'Butch' McArthur
- Maurice Black as Bing Murdock
- Robert Emmett O'Connor as Sergeant Schultze
- Eddie Kane as Headwaiter
- Frank Mills as Waiter (uncredited)
