= Longstreet (TV series) =

American TV crime series

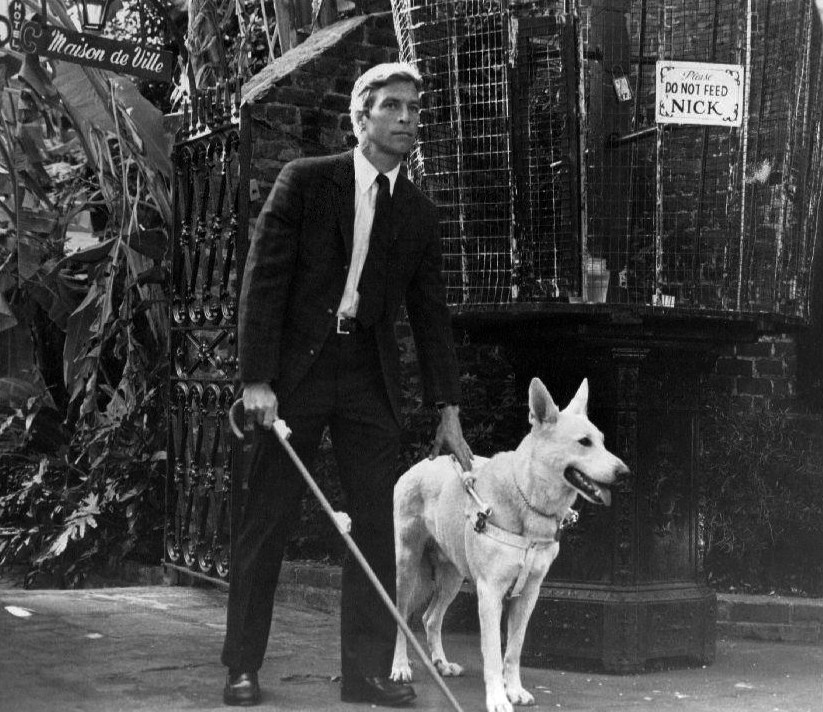
- James Franciscus as Longstreet, 1971.
- Genre: Crime drama
- Based on: Based Upon Characters Created by Baynard Kendrick
- Starring: James Franciscus; Marlyn Mason; Peter Mark Richman; Ann Doran
- Theme music composer: Oliver Nelson
- Country of origin: United States
- Original language: English
- No. of seasons: 1
- No. of episodes: 23 + pilot movie

Production
- Executive producer: Stirling Silliphant
- Producer: Joel Rogosin
- Running time: 60 minutes
- Production companies: Edling Productions; Corsican Productions; Paramount Network Television

Original release
- Network: ABC
- Release: September 16, 1971 – August 10, 1972

Longstreet is an American crime drama that was broadcast on ABC in the 1971–1972 season (see 1971 in television). A 90-minute pilot movie of the same name aired prior to the debut of the series as an ABC Movie of the Week.

== Synopsis ==
The series starred James Franciscus as insurance investigator Mike Longstreet. After a bomb hidden in a champagne bottle kills his wife, Ingrid, and leaves him blind, the title character pursues and captures the killers. He then continues his career as an insurance investigator despite his blindness. Longstreet's seeing eye dog was a white German Shepherd called Pax. The series was set in New Orleans, but was actually filmed in Los Angeles.

Mystery fiction novelist Baynard Kendrick was credited in each episode as the creator of the source material for the series. Kendrick's character, Captain Duncan Maclain, was a blind private detective with two German Shepherds.

Bruce Lee appeared in four episodes as Li Tsung, an antiques dealer and Jeet Kune Do expert who becomes Longstreet's martial arts instructor. Wikiquote has quotations from Li Tsung's teachings.

Twenty-three episodes of the show were aired before it was canceled in 1972.

== Regular and recurring characters ==
- Mike Longstreet - James Franciscus
- Nikki Bell - Marlyn Mason 22 episodes
- Duke Paige - Peter Mark Richman 20 episodes
- Mrs. Kingston - Ann Doran 17 episodes
- Li Tsung - Bruce Lee 4 episodes

== Episodes ==
=== Pilot (1971) ===
Title	Directed by	Written by	Original release date	Prod. code
Longstreet	Joseph Sargent	Stirling Silliphant	February 23, 1971	100
Pilot TV-movie: The story of Michael Longstreet, an insurance investigator recovering from an explosion that killed his wife and took his sight. He decides to remain an investigator and find those responsible for his wife's death and his blindness.

=== Season 1 (1971–72) ===
No.	Title	Directed by	Written by	Original release date	Prod. code
1	"The Way of the Intercepting Fist"	Don McDougall	Stirling Silliphant	September 16, 1971	102
Mike enlists the teachings of martial arts expert Li Tsung in order to defend himself despite his blindness. Note: This is the first of four appearances by Bruce Lee as Li Tsung.
2	"A World of Perfect Complicity"	Jud Taylor	Stirling Silliphant	September 23, 1971	101
Mike and Nikki go undercover as husband and wife in an exclusive apartment building, in an attempt to discover the identity of a thief who is robbing its wealthy residents.
3	"One in the Reality Column"	Don McDougall	Lionel E. Siegel	September 30, 1971	106
To prevent Mike from identifying the voice of a murderer in court, he is put through an ordeal where he is kidnapped, drugged with a hallucinogen, and left alone on a deserted ship.
4	"So, Who's Fred Hornbeck?"	David Lowell Rich	Sandor Stern	October 7, 1971	103
A man who spent several years in prison for a murder he didn't commit enlists Mike's help in finding the real killer.
5	"Elegy in Brass"	David Lowell Rich	Stephen Lord	October 14, 1971	105
When Mike begins investigating the murder of a Jazz Society director and the theft of two rare and valuable instruments, it leads him on a path into greed, ambition, hidden family secrets and the world of jazz music.
6	"Spell Legacy Like Death"	Paul Krasny	Story by : Sy Salkowitz; Teleplay by : Sy Salkowitz & Mark Rodgers	October 21, 1971	109
A dying man sets bombs around the city, and then calls Mike demanding $500,000 in ransom money. Mike suspects the bomber is someone from a case he worked in the past, as he meets with the bomber to pay the ransom. Note: This is the second of four appearances by Bruce Lee as Li Tsung.
7	"The Shape of Nightmares"	James Neilson	Stirling Silliphant	October 28, 1971	107
A young widow asks Mike to look into the apparent suicide of her husband, who died in prison. Mike enters the prison to investigate, and discovers evidence that he was actually murdered. A convict that Mike had sent to jail is now the "Head of the Yard," running the other inmates like a mob-boss from inside the prison walls, intent on getting revenge on Longstreet. Mike must use all his wits to solve the murder and stay alive.
8	"The Girl with the Broom"	Lee Philips	Reuben Bercovitch	November 4, 1971	104
A Rembrandt is stolen from a wealthy couple's home, and the owner doesn't think a blind insurance investigator is able to handle the job. Mike's investigation into the theft takes him into a web of hidden family secrets and lies.
9	"Wednesday's Child"	Jeannot Szwarc	Story by : Howard Browne; Teleplay by : Stephen Kandel & Mark Rodgers	November 11, 1971	110
Nikki is kidnapped after purchasing an antique sewing machine at an auction, and held for ransom. Mike must discover what's hidden within the machine that's of value, and then with Li's help find a way to rescue Nikki. Note: This is the third of four appearances by Bruce Lee as Li Tsung.
10	"'I See', Said the Blind Man"	Leslie H. Martinson	Sandor Stern	November 18, 1971	112
Mike overhears a woman being killed in a darkened alley, and sends Pax to help her. Pax is critically stabbed, and the attacker simply walks away, realizing Mike is blind. Longstreet must try to find out who the killer is. Note: This is the last of four appearances by Bruce Lee as Li Tsung.
11	"This Little Piggy Went to Marquette"	Charles S. Dubin	Robert M. Young	December 2, 1971	113
Mike investigates a series of thefts of semi-truck trailers (known as "pigs") and uncovers a ring of thieves.
12	"There Was a Crooked Man"	Don McDougall	Story by : John Joseph; Teleplay by : John Joseph & Mark Rodgers	December 9, 1971	114
A valuable racehorse is stolen and held for ransom. The kidnappers want Mike to deliver the ransom money, because they figure he won't be able to identify them. After the money is paid and the horse recovered, Mike begins to piece together clues that lead him to the kidnappers' identities. The investigation takes Mike down a winding path of murder, infidelity, family secrets, greed and betrayal.
13	"The Old Team Spirit"	James Sheldon	Robert Hamner	December 16, 1971	108
There has been a series of armored-car robberies, and Mike's old mentor, Harold Kemp, is in charge of the investigation. As Mike assists Harold in the investigation, he begins to suspect his mentor is involved.
14	"The Long Way Home"	Don McDougall	Richard H. Landau	December 30, 1971	111
Harper Electronics specializes in hiring handicapped employees, but the company is hit with a string of robberies. Going undercover to investigate, Mike becomes an employee with the firm.
15	"Let the Memories Be Happy Ones"	Jeffrey Hayden	Story by : Dick Nelson; Teleplay by : Mark Rodgers	January 6, 1972	115
Mike finally meets his sister-in-law Hannah, but their encounter is marred by an attempt on the life of Hannah's husband Sven, who is with the Swedish State Department and currently involved in sensitive discussions with other countries.
16	"Survival Times Two"	James H. Brown	Story by : Ron Bishop; Teleplay by : Mark Rodgers	January 13, 1972	116
Mike and Duke are stranded in the bayou while on a fishing trip. Duke is bitten by a water moccasin and falls deathly ill, forcing Mike to find a way to survive in the wild and fend off a crazed Cajun trying to kill them.
17	"Eye of the Storm"	Don McDougall	Shimon Wincelberg	January 20, 1972	117
Mike travels to a lonely roadside diner to meet the representative of a gang that stole a valuable jade chess set, in order to pay the ransom for its return. The man he is supposed to meet is a no-show as a hurricane blows through, stranding Mike and a group of fellow travelers. When the power goes out and plunges the café into total darkness, one of the customers is murdered with a steak knife. With a restaurant full of suspects, Mike wonders if the dead man is related to his insurance case.
18	"Please Leave the Wreck for Others to Enjoy"	Alexander Singer	Stirling Silliphant	January 27, 1972	119
Nikki is run down by a hit-and-run driver while working on a case with Mike, placing her in the hospital in critical condition. Mike blames himself and begins to question his real motives for being an investigator, as he falls into a deep depression. Duke fears he might give up and never recover, so he calls Mike's initial teacher after his accident, Dr. Dan Stockton. Packing up Mike's belongings, Dr. Stockton takes him to the blind school to help a young man who recently lost his sight and has given up on living, in hopes that Mike will find the desire within himself to keep on fighting.
19	"Anatomy of a Mayday"	James Harmon Brown	Robert W. Lenski	February 3, 1972	118
When Mike's friend Barry sends out a mayday and then disappears at sea, Mike feels someone may have tried to murder him. Investigating several potential suspects leads him to believe his friend is really still alive.
20	"Sad Songs and Other Conversations"	Don McDougall	Story by : Sandor Stern & Joel Rogosin; Teleplay by : Sandor Stern	February 10, 1972	120
When a fire breaks out in a hospital room, the patient inside dies. Mike investigates and suspects arson, but must sift through several suspects to find out who and why.
21	"Field of Honor"	Charles S. Dubin	Story by : Herb Meadow; Teleplay by : Herman Groves	February 17, 1972	121
Mike's good friend Jim Collins is the starting quarterback for the New Orleans football team. After suffering a terrible accident, Jim finds he may never walk again. Mike suspects the accident involved foul play.
22	"Through Shattering Glass"	James H. Brown	Jackson Gillis	February 24, 1972	122
When Mike hears a man being murdered, he pieces together enough clues to guess the killer's identity. He then plays a dangerous game as he pretends to be an eyewitness to the killing, hoping to draw the killer out into the open.
23	"The Sound of Money Talking"	Don McDougall	Story by : Lionel E. Siegel & Richard Shapiro; Teleplay by : Richard Shapiro	March 2, 1972	123
An elderly janitor robs the bank in which he works and is found murdered not long afterward. As Mike investigates he uncovers several suspects, including Nikki's former boyfriend, who works at the same bank.

== Syndication ==
The series has rarely been re-aired, but appeared on Canadian TV channel Mystery TV in 2005–2006.

== Home media ==
The series was released on a Region 2 DVD in Japan in late 2007.

On December 1, 2017, Visual Entertainment released Longstreet- The Complete Series on DVD in Region 1.
