= Harry Bannister =

American actor

- Born: September 29, 1889; Holland, Michigan, United States
- Died: February 26, 1961 (aged 71); New York City, United States
- Years active: Stage 1920–1954; Film 1921–1953; TV 1953–1956
- Spouses: Ann Harding (m. 1926; div. 1932) Leah Moskowitz Welt (m. 1936)
- Children: 2

Harry Bannister (September 29, 1889 – February 26, 1961) was an American stage, film and television actor, and theater producer and director.

== Biography ==
Born in Holland, Michigan, Bannister began acting in movies and on Broadway in the 1920s. He married the actress Ann Harding in 1926, and appeared with her in two films, Her Private Affair (1929) and The Girl of the Golden West (1930). The two of them also were prominent actors in Pittsburgh theatre, appearing in productions with the Sharp Company and later starting the Nixon Players. They were divorced in 1932.

Bannister founded the American Music Hall Theatre Group in New York City. Its first production, a melodrama entitled The Drunkard, ran for 277 performances. He appeared regularly on Broadway in the 1950s, starring, opposite Celeste Holm, in Affairs of State and in Love Me Long with Shirley Booth.

On television Bannister played one of the fathers in the 1953 Russel Crouse TV series Life with Father.

He died in Manhattan, New York City, at the age of 71.

== Filmography ==
Year	Title	Role	Notes
1921	The Porcelain Lamp	Grayson Whitney	
1929	Her Private Affair	Judge Richard Kessler	
1930	The Girl of the Golden West	Jack Rance	
1931	Suicide Fleet	Commander	
1931	Husband's Holiday	Andrew Trask	
1947	A Double Life	Second Actor	Uncredited
1953	Girl on the Run	Clay Reeves	

== Sources ==
- The New York Times, February 27, 1961: "Harry Bannister Is Dead at 72"
