= Her Private Affair =

1929 film

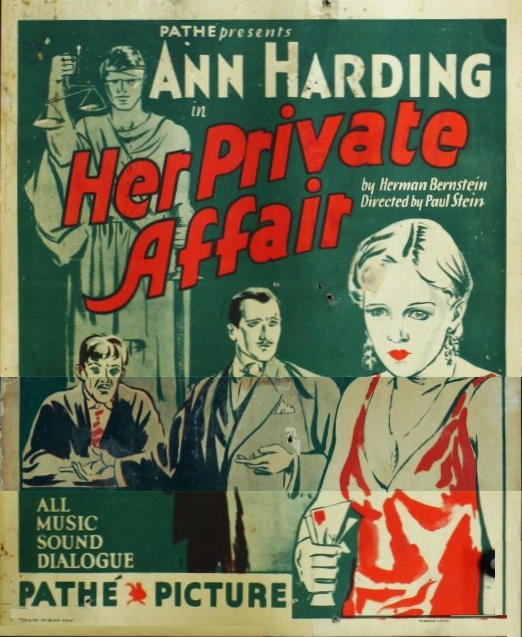
- Directed by: Paul L. Stein
- Written by: Francis Edward Faragoh
- Based on: The Right to Kill by Leo Urvantzov
- Starring: Ann Harding; Harry Bannister; John Loder
- Cinematography: David Abel; Norbert Brodine
- Edited by: Fred Maguire
- Music by: Josiah Zuro
- Production company: Pathe Exchange
- Distributed by: Pathe Exchange
- Release date: September 28, 1929
- Running time: 70 minutes
- Country: United States
- Language: English

Her Private Affair is a 1929 American drama film directed by Paul L. Stein and starring Ann Harding, Harry Bannister and John Loder. It was produced and distributed by the Pathé Exchange company. A silent film with sound effects and talking sequences.

== Plot ==
A judge's wife has an affair with a lawyer who plans to blackmail her.

== Cast ==
- Ann Harding as Vera Kessler
- Harry Bannister as Judge Richard Kessler
- John Loder as Carl Wield
- Kay Hammond as Julia Sturm
- Arthur Hoyt as Michael Sturm
- William Orlamond as Dr. Edmond Zeigler
- Lawford Davidson as Arnold Hartmann
- Elmer Ballard as Grimm
- Frank Reicher as State's Attorney

== See also ==
- List of early sound feature films (1926–1929)
