= Husband's Holiday =

1931 film

- Directed by: Robert Milton
- Screenplay by: Ernest Pascal; Viola Brothers Shore
- Starring: Clive Brook; Vivienne Osborne; Charlie Ruggles; Juliette Compton; Harry Bannister; Dorothy Tree; Adrienne Ames
- Cinematography: Charles Rosher
- Music by: John Leipold
- Production company: Paramount Pictures
- Distributed by: Paramount Pictures
- Release date: December 19, 1931
- Running time: 70 minutes
- Country: United States
- Language: English

Husband's Holiday is a 1931 American pre-Code drama film directed by Robert Milton and written by Ernest Pascal and Viola Brothers Shore. The film stars Clive Brook, Vivienne Osborne, Charlie Ruggles, Juliette Compton, Harry Bannister, Dorothy Tree and Adrienne Ames. The film was released on December 19, 1931, by Paramount Pictures.

== Cast ==
- Clive Brook as George Boyd
- Vivienne Osborne as Mary Boyd
- Charlie Ruggles as Clyde Saunders
- Juliette Compton as Christine Kennedy
- Harry Bannister as Andrew Trask
- Dorothy Tree as Cecily Reid
- Adrienne Ames as Myrtle
- Charles Winninger as Mr. Reid
- Elizabeth Patterson as Mrs. Caroline Reid
- Leni Stengel as Molly Saunders
- Dickie Moore as Philip Boyd
- Marilyn Knowlden as Anne Boyd
- Berton Churchill as Gerald Burgess

== Critical reception ==
Mordaunt Hall of the The New York Times wrote that the film "is sincere, but it is also dull." He wrote that Charles Ruggles provided the film's "few happy moments" and complimented Elizabeth Patterson's performance, but wrote that Clive Brook, Vivienne Osborne and Juliette Compton were "much too lugubrious for comfort."

Variety commented that the film was hindered by a "muddled story." They wrote, "[Clive] Brook is set for a tepid role which intensifies his habitual lukewarm style of playing, and the vivid brunette, Vivienne Osborne, is all but lost in the quiet part of a complacent wife of a cheating husband."

The Film Daily wrote that despite a strong cast, the characters were mostly unsympathetic and that as a result, there was very little entertainment value, though Charles Ruggles provided an "occasional very welcome touch of comedy", and "other bright spots" were provided by "a couple of cute kids, Dickie Moore and Marilyn Knowlden."
