= Kay Hammond (American actress) =

American actress

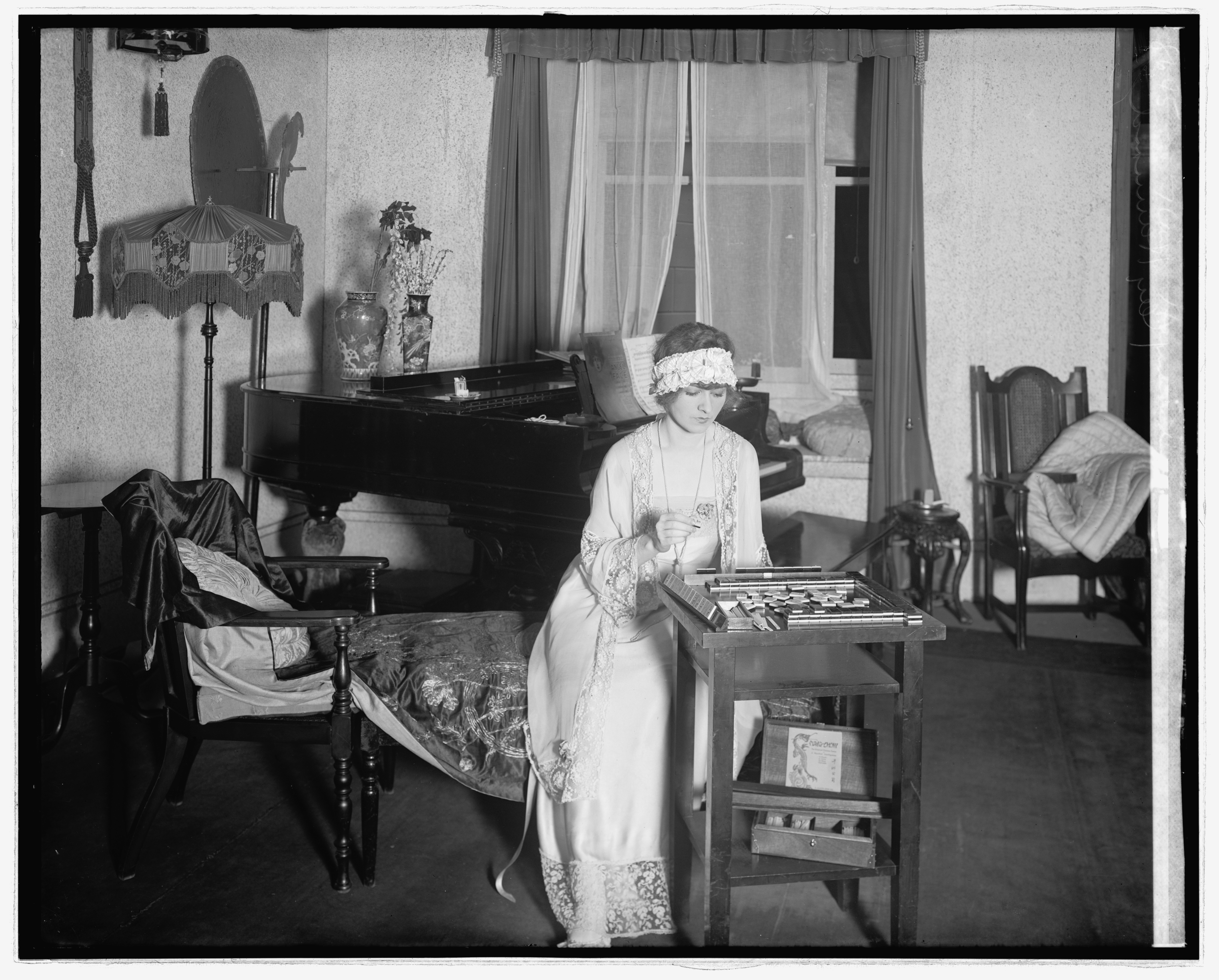
Kay Hammond

Kay Hammond (December 14, 1901 – January 7, 1982) was an American actress.

== Life and career ==
The daughter of Boyd Hammond, Kay Hammond was born in Helena, Montana on December 14, 1901. According to journalist and historian Brian D'Ambrosio, sources reporting she was born in Kansas City, Kansas are in error; with letters written by Hammond to childhood friends and family still in Helena while an adult in evidence as well as several Montana newspapers reporting on her Montana roots during her early career. She lived with her family in Helena on Ewing Street until 1918 when she moved with them to Los Angeles, California.

In 1921 Hammond had a minor role in a touring production of Ladies Night produced by A. H. Woods which played at the Eltinge Theatre on Broadway, the Globe Theatre in Atlantic City, New Jersey, and the Majestic Theatre in Brooklyn. In 1922 she starred as the wife in a production of James M. Barrie's A Slice of Life in Los Angeles. This was followed by a leading role in His Father's Boots at Los Angeles's Egan Theatre. After this she became a leading actress with the Smith King King Dramatic Stock Company; first appearing in the title role of the farce Up in Mabel's Room at Dalton's Broadway Theatre in June 1922. In August 1922 she starred in Albert Ellsworth Thomas's The Champion at the Alcazar Theatre in San Francisco, and the following month appeared at that same theatre in Ming Toy in Samuel Shipman's East is West.

On screen Hammond acted only in Hollywood productions; appearing in a total of eleven films. She made her film debut in 1929 in The Trespasser which starred Gloria Swanson, and later that year appeared as Julia Sturm in Her Private Affair. There has generally been some confusion to which of the two actresses was in the film Abraham Lincoln (1930) as some reference books designate an English actress of the same name. It is, however, widely accepted throughout filmography that it was the American actress.

In private life she was known as Mrs. Weatherby, having married into the Weatherby family who owned the Weatherby-Kayser shoe company.

== Filmography ==
Year	Title	Role	Notes
1929	The Trespasser	Catherine 'Flip' Merrick	
1929	Her Private Affair	Julia Sturm	
1930	Abraham Lincoln	Mary Todd Lincoln	
1933	Racetrack	Myra Curtis	
1933	Double Harness	Eleanor Weston	
1934	Eight Girls in a Boat	Katza	
1934	I Believed in You	Poetess	uncredited
1935	Way Down East	Mrs. Emma Stackpole	
1955	The Girl in the Red Velvet Swing	Nellie	uncredited
1956	The Ten Commandments	Grease Woman	uncredited
1965	The Greatest Story Ever Told		uncredited
