= Affairs of State =

1950 play written by Louis Verneuil

Affairs of State is a 1950 Broadway comedy play written and directed by Louis Verneuil. It opened at the Royale Theatre, then moved to the Music Box Theatre and played for a total of 610 performances.

It was the first play Verneuil wrote in English.

By 1952 Angela Lansbury was performing the former-Broadway play after she joined the East Coast touring production. Repertoire performances included 1954 at the Grand Theatre, Wolverhampton UK.

== Cast ==
- Celeste Holm – Irene Elliott
- Harry Bannister – Byron Winkler
- Elmer Brown – Lawrence
- Barbara O'Neil – Constance Russell
- Reginald Owen – Philip Russell
- Shepperd Strudwick – George Henderson

== Sources ==
- "Affairs of State: Celeste Holm is Starred in a French Farce that has a Washington Setting" by Brooks Atkinson, The New York Times, October 1, 1950
- "Affairs of State to Arrive September 25th" by Louis Calta, The New York Times, August 24, 1950
- Bonanno, Margaret Wander (1987). Angela Lansbury: A Biography. New York: St. Martin's Press. ISBN 978-0-312-00561-0.
- Edelman, Rob; Kupferberg, Audrey E. (1996). Angela Lansbury: A Life on Stage and Screen. Secaucus, New Jersey: Carol Publishing Corporation. ISBN 978-1-55972-327-5.
- Gottfried, Martin (1999). Balancing Act: The Authorised Biography of Angela Lansbury. New York: Little, Brown and Company. ISBN 978-0-316-32225-6.
