= Baynard Kendrick =

American novelist

Baynard Hardwick Kendrick
- Born: April 8, 1894; Philadelphia, Pennsylvania
- Died: March 22, 1977; Ocala, Florida
- Occupation: Author
- Spouse(s): Edythe Stevens, Jean Morris
- Writing career
- Genre: Mystery

Baynard Hardwick Kendrick (April 8, 1894 – March 22, 1977) was an American mystery novelist. He wrote whodunit novels about Duncan Maclain, a blind private investigator who worked with his two German shepherds and his household of assistants to solve murder mysteries. The novels were the basis for two films starring Edward Arnold, Eyes in the Night(1942) and The Hidden Eye (1945). Kendrick was credited by Stirling Silliphant for being the source of the Longstreet character about a blind insurance investigator. He also wrote using the pseudonym Richard Hayward.

== Biography ==
Kendrick was born in Philadelphia and traveled to Canada as the first American citizen to enlist in the Canadian Army during World War I. He served in England, France, and Salonika. During his service, a fellow Philadelphian serving with the Canadians was blinded. When Kendrick visited him at St Dunstan's he met a blind English soldier who had a remarkable ability to tell him things about himself that a sighted person may not have noticed. The Tommy fingered Kendrick's buttons, uniform and insignia and accurately and rapidly stated Kendrick's war service record.

Following the war, Kendrick sold his first story, a tale about Florida fishing called "The Captain's Lost Lake, to Field and Stream magazine while earning his living at Bin and Big's Hotels in New York. In 1931 he was let go from the company a week before Christmas and, vowing never again to work for an employer, began supporting himself by writing. After three books Kendrick started writing for pulp magazines, which paid well.

Kendrick's writing reflected two personal interests that he had developed: an interest in blind people and their coping skills and an interest in the history of Florida. He wrote a weekly historical column, "Florida's Fabulous Past," for the Sunday Tampa Tribune for more than three years.

During World War II, Kendrick served as an instructor for blinded veterans giving him the material for his novel set in Palatka, Florida called Lights Out. It was later made into a movie under the title Bright Victory starring Arthur Kennedy (in the movie version, the name of Palatka is changed to Seminola). A paperback version of the book was also published under the title Bright Victory. Kendrick had once lived in Palatka, working for the Selden Cypress Door Company. He had great success with Flames of Time, a historic novel set in Florida at the time of the War of 1812.

His novel Out of Control was adapted to an episode of the radio thriller series Suspense in 1946, featuring Brian Donlevy as Duncan Maclain.

The true story behind Kendrick's 1959 Hot Red Money was the basis for John Barron's Operation SOLO: The FBI's Man in the Kremlin.

Kendrick was one of the founders of the Mystery Writers of America, held its first membership card, and was its first president. He received the organization's Grand Master Award, recognizing lifetime achievement and consistent quality of mystery writing, in 1967. He was also a director of the Florida Historical Society, and served for a time as member of the editorial board of the Florida Historical Quarterly.

He died in 1977.

== Duncan Maclain novels ==
Novels in the Duncan Maclain series:

- The Last Express (1937). Filmed in 1938 for Universal.
- The Whistling Hangman (1937)
- Odor of Violets (1941) (aka Eyes in the Night). Filmed as Eyes in the Night in 1942. First published as a newspaper serial in the New York Daily News and others, 1941, as The Odor of Violets
- Blind Man's Bluff (1943). First published as a newspaper serial in the New York Daily News and others, 1942
- Death Knell (1945). First published as a newspaper serial in the New York Daily News and others, 1945, as Private Investigator Maclain (1945)
- Out of Control (1945)
- Make Mine Maclain (three novelets) (1947)
- The Murderer Who Wanted More (Dell Ten-Cent edition, 1951, one of the three novelets from Make Mine Maclain, q.v.)
- You Die Today (1952)
- Blind Allies (1954). First published as a newspaper serial in 1954
- Clear and Present Danger (1958). First published as a newspaper serial in 1958
- Reservations for Death (1958). First published as a newspaper serial in 1956
- The Aluminum Turtle (1960) (aka The Spear Gun Murders). First published as a newspaper serial in 1960
- Frankincense and Murder (1961). First published as a newspaper serial in 1961

== Miles Standish Rice novels ==
- The Eleven of Diamonds (1936) New York: Greenburg. Serialised, Vancouver Sun (1937)
- The Iron Spiders (1936) (aka The Iron Spiders Murder) New York: Greenburg.
- Death Beyond the Go-Thru (1938) New York: Doubleday, Doran.

== Non-series novels ==
- Blood on Lake Louisa (1934) New York: Greenburg.
- Flames of Time (1948) New York: Charles Scribner's Sons.
- The Tunnel (1949)
- Trapped (1952) (under the pseudonym of Richard Hayward)
- They Never Talk Back (1954). Novel by Henry Trefflich, "as told to Baynard Kendrick"
- The Soft Arms of Death (1954) (under the pseudonym of Richard Hayward)
- Hot Red Money (1959). First published as a newspaper serial in 1959
- Flight from a Firing Wall (1966) New York: Simon & Schuster.
- Lights Out (1945) New York: William Morrow. Filmed as Bright Victory (1951)

== Other books ==
- Orlando: A Century Plus (1976)

== Short stories ==
- The Hard Way. Chicago Tribune, 3 January 1943
- The Murderer Who Wanted More. American Magazine, January 1944
- Melody in Death. American Magazine, June 1945
- The Perfect Murder (1947) (Maclain). Also published as The Case of the Perfect Murder Scheme
- Minus Four Equals Murder (1954)
- Hotel in the Hammock (1956)
- The Cloth of Gold Murders. American Magazine, January 1956
- Silent Night. Sleuth Mystery Magazine, December 1958; Murder For Christmas, 1982, Volume 2
- The Silent Whistle

== Articles ==
- Florida's 'Most Vulnerable' Spot. Tampa Tribune, 5 February 1961
- Jose Met His Match. Tampa Tribune, 12 February 1961
- Those Bass Were Bigger in 1908!. Tampa Tribune, 19 February 1961
- No Whiskey in the White House!. Tampa Tribune, 26 February 1961
- Over the Mudholes in a Maxwell. Tampa Tribune, 5 March 1961
- The Near Death of a Salesman. Tampa Tribune, 12 March 1961
- He Changed His Name to Yule. Tampa Tribune, 19 March 1961
- Blue-Nosed Reformer and His Sinful Paradise. Tampa Tribune, 26 March 1961
- WA Bowles - Florida's Uncrowned King. Tampa Tribune, 16 April 1961
- The Slave Trader with an African Wife. Tampa Tribune, 23 April 1961
- The Costly Seminole War over Stray Slaves. Tampa Tribune, 30 April 1961
- That Riotous Hunting Trip to Gulf Hammock. Tampa Tribune, 7 May 1961
- Daniel McGirth and His Horse Gray Goose. Tampa Tribune, 14 May 1961
- Florida Banks Crashed in Earlier Boom Too. Tampa Tribune, 21 May 1961
- When Sidney J Catts Went Republican. Tampa Tribune, 11 June 1961
- Bubbling Tourist Trade on the St John's River. Tampa Tribune, 18 June 1961
- 'Wreck Ashore!' The Cry that Wrecked Key West. Tampa Tribune, 25 June 1961
- How Governor Duval Bearded an Indian Chief. Tampa Tribune, 2 July 1961
- A Black-Hearted Pair - Blackbeard and Caesar. Tampa Tribune, 17 September 1961
- Chactaws Took Good Care of Aged Ill. Tampa Tribune, 12 August 1962
- Patrick Speaks on 'Mobile Frontier'. Tampa Tribune, 6 January 1963
- An Election Day Threat Shot down in Ambush in the Wild and Wooley Days. Tampa Tribune, 3 November 1968
