= Eyes in the Night =

1942 film by Fred Zinnemann

- Theatrical release poster
- Directed by: Fred Zinnemann; Edward Sedgwick (uncredited)
- Screenplay by: Guy Trosper; Howard Emmett Rogers
- Based on: The Odor of Violets; 1941 novel by Baynard Kendrick
- Produced by: Jack Chertok
- Starring: Edward Arnold; Ann Harding; Donna Reed
- Cinematography: Charles Lawton Jr. Robert Planck
- Edited by: Ralph E. Winters
- Music by: Lennie Hayton; Daniele Amfitheatrof
- Distributed by: Metro-Goldwyn-Mayer
- Release date: October 16, 1942
- Running time: 80 minutes
- Country: United States
- Language: English
- Budget: $433,000
- Box office: $978,000

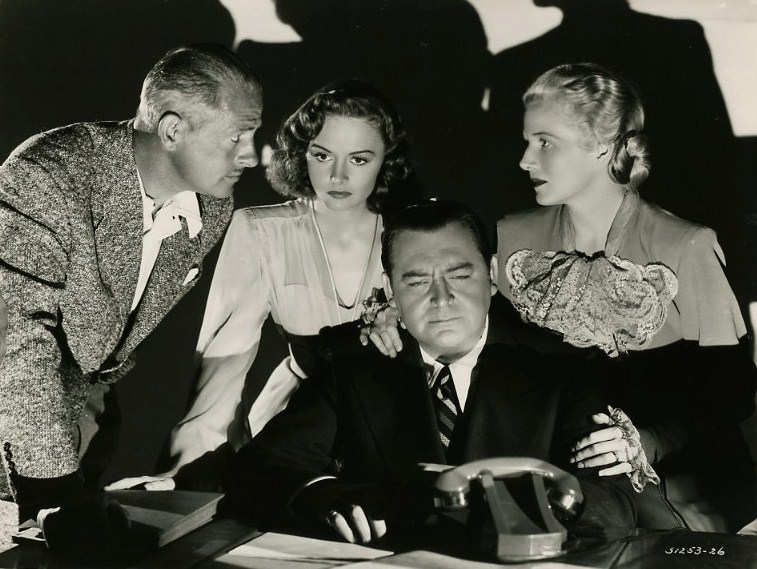
L-R: Reginald Denny, Donna Reed, Edward Arnold, and Ann Harding

Eyes in the Night is a 1942 American crime mystery starring Edward Arnold, Ann Harding, and Donna Reed. Directed by Fred Zinnemann (with uncredited scenes directed by Edward Sedgwick), it is based on Baynard Kendrick's 1941 novel The Odor of Violets.

The film was followed by a sequel (also starring Arnold), The Hidden Eye (1945).

== Plot ==
New York private detective Duncan "Mac" Maclain is blind, but he has keenly developed his other senses. Skilled in self-defense, he pursues his work with the help of his faithful guide dog Friday and assistant Marty.

Retired actress Norma Lawry, an old friend, comes seeking advice. Her headstrong 17-year-old stepdaughter Barbara, herself a promising actress, is enamored with her leading man Paul Gerente, a much older Lothario. Paul, who once had been Norma's lover, has convinced Barbara that Norma actually wants him for herself and only has married her father Stephen for his money. Stephen has invented a secret weapon for the U.S. war effort.

Barbara arrives at Paul’s apartment and finds him dead, with Norma there. Norma insists she'd found him that way, but Barbara concludes that Norma has killed him and threatens to call the police unless she leaves Stephen.

Norma then turns to Maclain, who goes to Paul's apartment with Friday and Marty, only to find both the body and the rug under it missing. Mac picks up a clue and barges into Norma's house, pretending to be her curmudgeonly "Uncle Mac". Hansen the butler is second in command of a German espionage ring, waiting for an opportunity to get the plans for Stephen’s secret weapon. Hansen had one of his henchmen kill Paul, whose affection for Barbara was beginning to limit his effectiveness.

The spies' ringleader is Barbara's dramatic coach, Cheli Scott, who spends the night at the Lawry home and immediately suspects Mac is not what he seems. Stephen arrives home and Cheli threatens to have Norma’s face disfigured in Stephen's presence unless he surrenders the final step to his invention. Mac, under guard, is locked in the cellar and sends Friday for help. When Hansen is sent to kill him, Mac knocks out the light there to gain an advantage in the total darkness, then overpowers him.

Marty and Friday return with the police, and Stephen and Norma leave for Washington. Barbara, however, remains cheerfully behind to paint the town with her new "Uncle Mac."

== Production ==
Eyes in the Night had originally been assigned to longtime MGM staff director Edward Sedgwick, who had proven effective with offbeat subjects but was usually a comedy director. Producer Jack Chertok, formerly in charge of the studio's dramatic Crime Does Not Pay short subjects, judged Sedgwick's approach to the Maclain story as being too lightweight, and he replaced Sedgwick during production with promising short-subjects director Fred Zinnemann. Sedgwick was reassigned to a more suitable subject, the Laurel and Hardy comedy Air Raid Wardens.

== Reception ==
Trade critics questioned the plausibility of the Nazi-agents story but liked the novel premise. Film Daily: "Without the benefit of eyesight, the sleuth is able to accomplish more than many a movie gumshoe with two good optics. This may be overburdening the credulity a bit, but it is admittedly a device of great effectiveness." Film Bulletin: "First-rate acting treatment but it fails to make a completely convincing film. Picture has far too many highly melodramatic moments. The unusual character of a blind detective who is guided by his seeing eye dog is the saving grace of Eyes in the Night, and this angle can be exploited to attract mystery fans. Edward Arnold is excellent in the difficult role of the blind detective." Trade publisher Pete Harrison: "This melodrama adds up as pretty good program fare. The story is routine and farfetched but it holds one's interest fairly well, for it offers fast action, a few exciting situations, and comedy. Friday the dog is exceptionally good." The Exhibitor: "Better-than-average programmer; top dualler [for double-feature programs]. There is not much mystery in the picture, most of the suspense coming from the play between blind Arnold and the Nazis. Arnold is excellent as the blind detective."

According to MGM records, the film earned $513,000 in the U.S. and Canada and $465,000 in other markets, resulting in a profit of $230,000.

== Cast ==
- Edward Arnold as Duncan "Mac" Maclain
- Ann Harding as Norma Lawry
- Donna Reed as Barbara Lawry
- Stephen McNally as Gabriel Hoffman, Lawry's chauffeur (as Horace McNally)
- Katherine Emery as Cheli Scott
- Allen Jenkins as Marty
- Stanley Ridges as Hansen, Lawry's butler
- Reginald Denny as Stephen Lawry
- John Emery as Paul Gerente
- Rosemary DeCamp as Vera Hoffman, Lawry's maid
- Barry Nelson as Busch, henchman
- Reginald Sheffield as Victor
- Steven Geray as Anderson
- Mantan Moreland as Alistair, Duncan's butler
