= Suicide Fleet =

1931 film directed by Albert S. Rogell

- Screen shot of title card for the film
- Directed by: Albert S. Rogell
- Screenplay by: Lew Lipton; F. McGrew Willis
- Based on: Mystery Ship by Herbert A. Jones
- Produced by: Charles R. Rogers
- Starring: William Boyd; Robert Armstrong; James Gleason; Ginger Rogers
- Cinematography: Sol Polito
- Edited by: Joseph Kane
- Music by: Arthur Lange
- Production company: RKO Pictures
- Distributed by: RKO Pictures
- Release date: November 20, 1931 (US)
- Running time: 87 minutes
- Country: United States
- Language: English

Suicide Fleet is a 1931 American pre-Code war film directed by Albert S. Rogell, written by Lew Lipton and F. McGrew Willis, and starring William Boyd, Robert Armstrong, James Gleason, and Ginger Rogers. It was released on November 20, 1931, by RKO Pictures.

== Plot ==
Three friends who work on the Coney Island Boardwalk, Skeets O'Reilly, Baltimore Clark, and Dutch Herman are all in love with the same woman, Sally. At the outbreak of World War I, the three men enlist in the US Navy. Before they leave for active duty, both Skeets and Baltimore meet with Sally, with the intention of letting her know how they feel about her. Baltimore can't bear the thought of Sally rejecting him, so he never discloses the depths of his feelings towards her. Skeets does propose to her, which she gently declines, being secretly in love with Baltimore.

The three are assigned to a US Naval destroyer, Dutch and Skeets subordinate to Baltimore, who is promoted to a chief petty officer, because he has served in the navy before. A German U-boat intercepts a sailing ship flying Norwegian colors, and when the German officer boards the ship, the Norwegian captain shares information with him regarding the movements of allied shipping, thus revealing that the Norwegian ship is an undercover "message ship" for the Germans. Shortly after this encounter, the destroyer carrying the three friends also intercepts the sailing ship. In an attempt to destroy incriminating evidence, the Norwegian captain sets the ship afire. The three sailors are part of the boarding party, and Baltimore manages to take possession of coded dispatches prior to the ship's sinking.

After the messages are decoded, it enables the US Navy to equip a fake "message ship", and O'Reilly, Clark and Herman are part of the crew assigned to man the vessel. The message ship cruises the Atlantic, hoping to be approached by a German submarine. Eventually they are, and during the encounter, they learn of the German plans to ambush and sink a fleet of American destroyers. As the Germans are about to leave, one of their officers becomes suspicious of the crew of the phony message ship. He exposes the American subterfuge, and the Germans return to their submarine and ready to sink the sailing ship. Before they can, Dutch manages to get a warning off to the American fleet. The US destroyers arrive, and the three German U-boats are sunk, two by American destroyers, and the third by the sailing ship. The three men return as heroes to the United States, and Baltimore marries Sally.

== Cast ==
- Bill Boyd as Baltimore
- Robert Armstrong as Dutch
- James Gleason as Skeets
- Ginger Rogers as Sally
- Harry Bannister as Commander
- Frank Reicher as Holtzmann
- Ben Alexander as Kid
- Henry Victor as Captain Von Schlettow
- Hans Joby as Schwartz

== Production ==
In early March 1931, RKO announced that Boyd's first picture with the fledgling studio would be the submarine drama, Suicide Fleet. The original title of the film was Mystery Ship, referring to the clandestine nature of the ship communicating with the Germans. The following month, Lew Lipton was said to be working on the story, which was to be adapted to the screen by Marion Jackson, although Harold Shumate was also mentioned as the author of the story. By July both James Gleason and Robert Armstrong had been attached to the film, and it was published that Pierre Collings had been allocated to assist writing the screenplay. The film began production on July 27, 1931. The trade papers announced Sal Polito as the director of photography and Denzel A. Cutler as the sound editor. In August RKO announced the addition of Harry Bannister to the cast. Even though the film was already in production, the final pieces of the cast were announced in late August: Frank Reicher, Henry Victor, and Hans Joby. Several thousand extras were employed by RKO for the filming. Ginger Rogers, who had appeared in several smaller roles for Paramount Pictures, with whom she was under contract, was given her first starring role in this film.

The film was partially shot at the San Pedro Naval Base, as well as on the studio's Culver City studio. In late August, the cast and crew spent several weeks at sea filming, 25–50 miles off the coast of San Diego, California, in cooperation with the United States Navy, before returning to the Culver City studio. During this time, an actual obsolete navy vessel was sunk during filming. During filming, Albert Rogell, through actual US Naval officers, had ten US Navy vessels under his command. Two sailing ships, the USS Indiana and the USS Bohemia were used extensively during the weeks the production was at sea, as were several tugs, submarines (including the USS Argonaut – at the time the largest submarine in the world), and destroyers, including the USS Dent. Child actor, Ben Alexander, was announced as part of the cast of Suicide Fleet. RKO was reporting the completion of production of the film by mid-October.

The film employed a new type of portable sound recording equipment, which employed the dual system of film and sound on separate recording reels. The unit was smaller, weighed less, and was more portable than other units of the era.

RKO announced in early November that the film was scheduled for release Thanksgiving weekend. Joe Kane began the final editing of the picture shortly after. On November 16, RKO announced that the film would be released on November 20. The film opened at the Mayfair Theater, whose front had been "converted" into a replica of US Navy battleship, on November 20, 1931. The film ended production $85,000 over budget.

== Reception ==
Film Daily gave the film a positive review, calling it "... one of the best Navy spectacles ever made." Film Daily went on to say that the battle action film sequences "... carry a powerful kick as impressive as if a newsreel cameraman had caught actual engagements during a sea battle".
