= The Girl of the Golden West (1930 film) =

1930 film

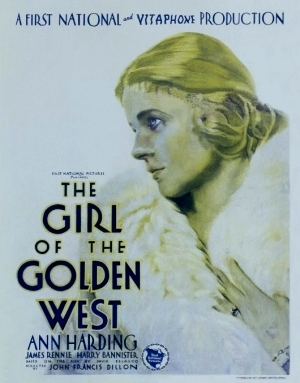
- Directed by: John Francis Dillon
- Screenplay by: Waldemar Young
- Based on: The Girl of the Golden West; 1905 play by David Belasco
- Produced by: Robert North
- Starring: Ann Harding
- Cinematography: Sol Polito
- Production company: First National Pictures
- Distributed by: Warner Bros. Pictures, Inc.
- Release date: October 12, 1930
- Running time: 81 minutes
- Country: United States
- Language: English

The Girl of the Golden West is a 1930 American Pre-Code Western film produced and distributed by First National Pictures, a subsidiary of Warner Bros. Pictures, directed by John Francis Dillon and starring actress Ann Harding and James Rennie. Harding's then-husband, Harry Bannister, plays the villain Jack Rance. David Belasco wrote, directed, and produced the original play in 1905 which starred Blanche Bates.

Two previous silent film versions of the play were made, one by Cecil B. DeMille in 1915 and another starring Sylvia Breamer in 1923. More famously, Belasco's play was filmed yet again in 1938 as a musical with operetta duo Jeanette MacDonald and Nelson Eddy.

Cinematographer Sol Polito also worked on the 1923 silent version.

== Plot ==
Minnie runs the Polka saloon during the days of the California Gold Rush in California, and lives on the money brought in by the drinking and gambling at her establishment. She is highly respected by the miners who live in the area, and they protect her and see to it that no harm comes her way. Minnie falls in love with Dick Johnson, who mysteriously rides into town one day. Minnie does not know that he is a notorious road agent who is being sought after by the agents of the Wells Fargo express. Instead, Minnie believes that Johnson is a miner.

Jack Rance is a sheriff in love with Minnie, but is rejected by her. Johnson plans to rob the Polka saloon, which serves as a depository for the miner's gold dust; however, he drops his plans to rob the saloon as he becomes attracted to Minnie and falls in love with her. Rance finds out that Johnson is staying with Minnie and heads out to the saloon to arrest him. Minnie denies that Johnson is with her, and while he attempts to escape from the saloon, he is spotted and wounded. He manages to escape, however, and Minnie shelters him again once the sheriff has left.

The sheriff comes back once again, and Minnie again denies that Johnson is there. Johnson, who is still bleeding, is hiding on the rafters near the ceiling and when drops of blood fall to the floor the sheriff realizes that Minnie has been lying. Minnie then challenges the sheriff to a poker game for Johnson's freedom, as well as her own, and wins, much to the chagrin of the sheriff. Vigilantes approach the saloon and demand that Johnson surrender himself to be hanged. He is given a few moments to say goodbye to Minnie after which he attempts to shoot himself. The vigilantes finally relent after Minnie's pleading and allow Johnson and Minnie to escape. The film ends as we see them on their journey to begin a new life together.

== Cast ==
- Ann Harding as Minnie
- James Rennie as Dick Johnson
- Harry Bannister as Jack Rance
- Ben Hendricks Jr. as Handsome Charlie
- J. Farrell MacDonald as Sonora Slim
- George Cooper as Trinidad Joe
- Johnnie Walker as Nick
- Richard Carlyle as Jim Larkins
- Arthur Stone as Joe Castro
- Arthur Housman as Sidney Dick
- Norman McNeil as Happy Holiday
- Fred Warren as Jack Wallace
- Joseph W. Girard as Ashby

== Preservation ==
No film elements are known to survive. All Vitaphone disks of the soundtrack were discovered in February 2024, according to a poster in the "Ron Hutchinson's Vitaphone Project" group on Facebook.

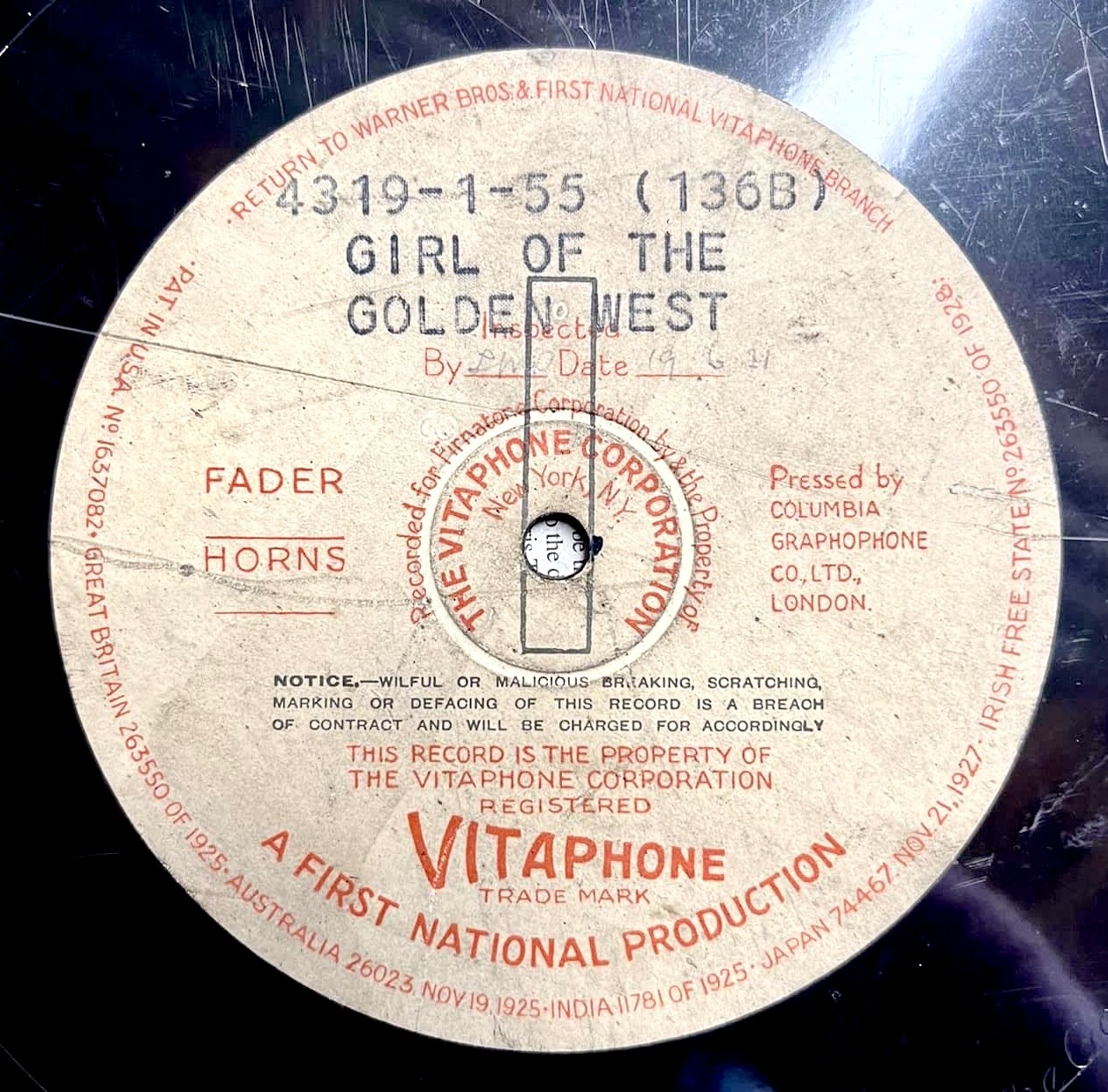
Girl of the Golden West 1930 Disk

== See also ==
- List of American films of 1930
