= William Holden (character actor) =

American actor

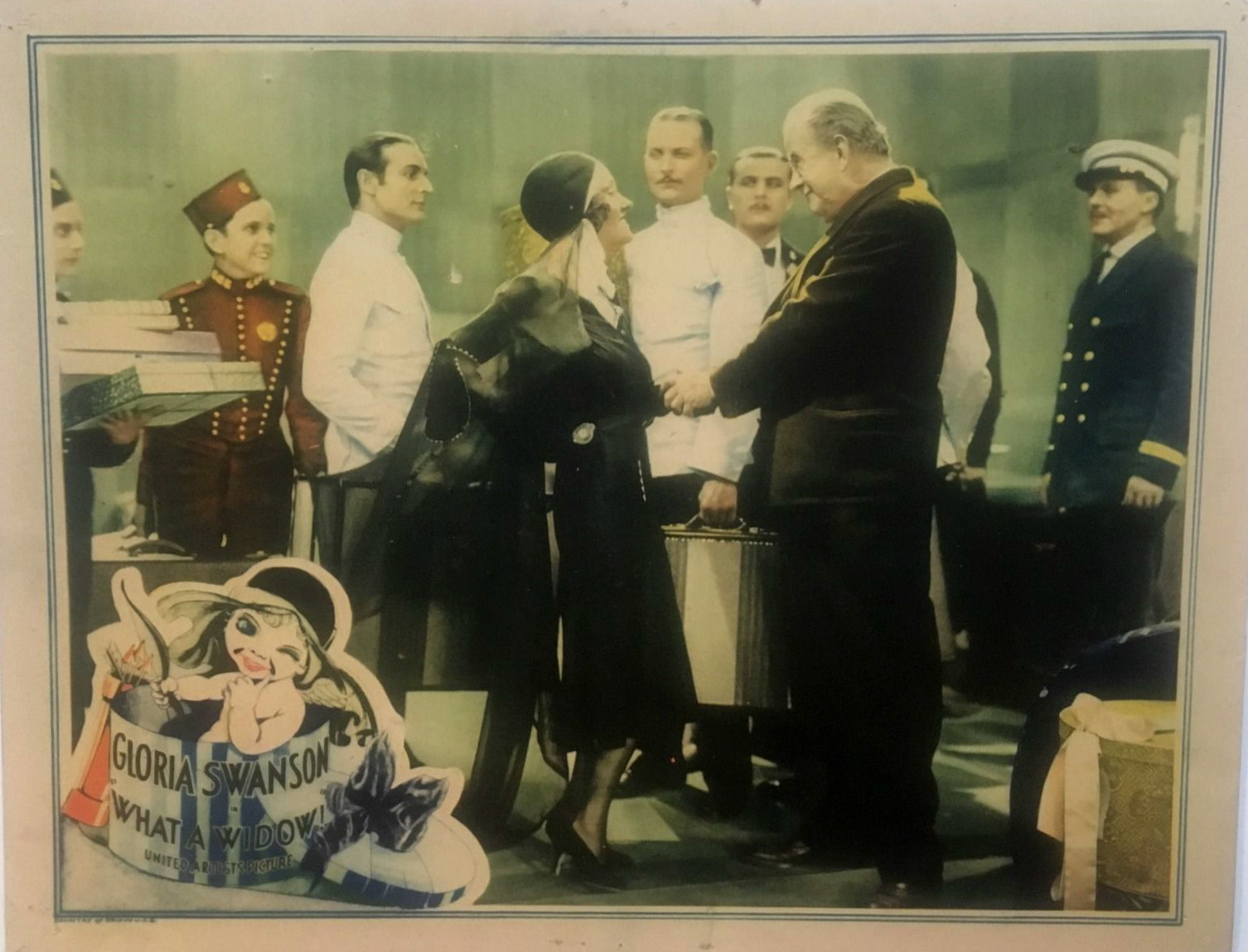
- William Holden holding Gloria Swanson's hand in What a Widow! (1930)
- Born: 22 May 1862; Rochester, New York, United States
- Died: 3 March 1932 (aged 69); Los Angeles, US
- Occupation: Actor
- Years active: 1920–1931

William Holden (22 May 1862 – 3 March 1932) was an American actor. He appeared in more than 16 films from 1920 to 1931.

== Selected filmography ==
| Year | Title | Role | Notes |
|---|---|---|---|
| 1929 | Weary River | Warden | |
| 1929 | The Trespasser | John Merrick Sr | |
| 1929 | Dynamite | | |
| 1930 | Holiday | Edward Seton | |
| 1930 | Not So Dumb | Charles Roger Ford | |
| 1930 | Three Faces East | Winston Chamberlain | |
| 1930 | Framed | Inspector Butch McArthur | |
| 1931 | The Man Who Came Back | Thomas Randolph | |
| 1931 | Dance, Fools, Dance | Stanley Jordan | |
| 1931 | Charlie Chan Carries On | Patrick Tait | |
