= The Trespasser (1929 film) =

1929 film

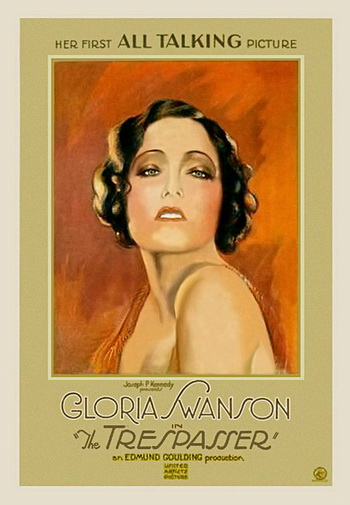
- Film poster
- Directed by: Edmund Goulding
- Written by: Edmund Goulding
- Produced by: Joseph P. Kennedy
- Starring: Gloria Swanson; Robert Ames
- Cinematography: George Barnes; Gregg Toland
- Edited by: Cyril Gardner
- Music by: Josiah Zoro; Edmund Goulding (song "Love, Your Magic Spell Is Everywhere", Elsie Janis lyrics)
- Distributed by: United Artists
- Release date: November 11, 1929
- Running time: 90 minutes
- Country: United States
- Language: English

The Trespasser is a 1929 American pre-Code film written and directed by Edmund Goulding and starring Gloria Swanson, Robert Ames, Purnell Pratt, Henry B. Walthall, and Wally Albright. The film was released by United Artists in both silent and sound versions.

== Plot ==
Marion Donnell, a stenographer in Chicago (Gloria Swanson) elopes with wealthy Jack Merrick (Robert Ames). Their marriage is opposed by his father (William Holden) who considers Marion a fortune-hunter and demands that Jack have the marriage annulled. Marion, furious that Jack has not defended her and stood up to his father, leaves him. Eighteen months later, unbeknownst to Jack, she has given birth to their son, Jackie, and is living alone to raise him. Unable to meet her bills and provide support she becomes a "kept woman" for her employer, Hector Ferguson (Purnell Pratt) an older, married man. He puts her up in a lavish apartment on Chicago's Lakeshore Drive, providing her with clothing, jewels, servants and means. When Ferguson collapses, suddenly at his club, his wife (Mary Forbes) calls for Marion, telling her that he has asked for her at his deathbed. He dies leaving Marion a $500,000 inheritance and the press is quick to publicize their illicit relationship, casting doubts upon the paternity of Marion's child.

Seeking protection for her son, she sends for Jack, now remarried to Catherine "Flip" Carson. (Kay Hammond) When Marion presents Jack with his son they rekindle their love for each other, Jack making plans to abandon his wife. However, Flip comes to visit Marion; having been injured in an automobile accident on a honeymoon trip to France, she requires a wheelchair and is unable to bear children. She declares that she is prepared to let Jack go, due to her disability and because she knows that he is still in love with Marion. Deeply moved by Flip's sacrifice, and for the sake of her child, she sends Jackie to live with Jack and Flip. She sinks to the floor in despair as Jackie's nanny, Mrs. Potter (Blanche Friderici) leads him away. She returns the $500,000 to Ferguson's estate and relocates to New York. Some years later, Flip has died leaving Marion and Jack free to reunite.

== Cast ==
- Gloria Swanson as Marion Donnell
- Robert Ames as Jack Merrick
- Purnell Pratt as Hector Ferguson
- Henry B. Walthall as Fuller
- Wally Albright as Jackie
- William Holden as John Merrick Sr.
- Blanche Friderici as Miss Potter (as Blanche Frederici)
- Kay Hammond as Catherine 'Flip' Merrick
- Mary Forbes as Mrs. Ferguson
- Marcelle Corday as Blanche

== Production background ==
The Trespasser was produced as both a silent and sound version for a total negative cost of $725,000. Gloria Swanson, in her sound film debut, received an Academy Award nomination. It was written and directed by Edmund Goulding and was first filmed as a silent film. A sound version was quickly made and was a big hit for its star, Gloria Swanson. Goulding remade the film as That Certain Woman (1937) with Bette Davis and Henry Fonda.

== Preservation status ==
The George Eastman Museum preserved the film with the help of the American Film Institute and The Film Foundation. This restored version was shown on Turner Classic Movies on December 14, 2011.

== Legacy ==
The Trespasser proved to be one of Swanson's only two hit sound films, the other being Sunset Boulevard (1950) many years later. Subsequent films like What a Widow! (1930), Indiscreet (1931), Tonight or Never (1931), Perfect Understanding (1933), and Music in the Air (1934) were all box-office flops.

The Trespasser was an important film for Swanson, following the financially disastrous Queen Kelly (1929) and the hit Sadie Thompson (1928). This was Swanson's second Oscar nomination. Despite the disappointments following The Trespasser, Swanson was remembered by Billy Wilder, a screenwriter on Music in the Air (1934), when he was casting the part of Norma Desmond for Sunset Boulevard (1950).

== See also ==
- List of early sound feature films (1926–1929)
