= Biography of a Bachelor Girl =

1935 American comedy film directed by Edward H. Griffith

- Theatrical release poster
- Directed by: Edward H. Griffith
- Screenplay by: Anita Loos; Horace Jackson (additional dialogue)
- Based on: Biography; 1932 play by S. N. Behrman
- Produced by: Edward H. Griffith
- Starring: Ann Harding; Robert Montgomery; Edward Everett Horton; Edward Arnold; Una Merkel; Charles Richman
- Cinematography: James Wong Howe
- Edited by: William S. Gray
- Music by: Herbert Stothart
- Production company: Metro-Goldwyn-Mayer
- Distributed by: Loew's Inc.
- Release date: January 4, 1935
- Running time: 82 minutes
- Country: United States
- Language: English

Biography of a Bachelor Girl is a 1935 American comedy film directed by Edward H. Griffith and written by Horace Jackson and Anita Loos. It is based upon the play, "Biography," by S. N. Behrman. The film stars Ann Harding, Robert Montgomery, Edward Everett Horton, Edward Arnold, Una Merkel and Charles Richman. It was released on January 4, 1935, by Metro-Goldwyn-Mayer.

== Plot ==
Cynical and hard-bitten publisher Richard Kurt persuades free-spirited bohemian artist Marion Forsythe to write her memoirs, which he hopes will be salacious. Her old (and nearly forgotten) flame Leander Nolan (which she nicknames him Bunny) is now running for the Senate and fears embarrassment and political ruin. Spurred by his wealthy backer and prospective father-in-law, Nolan tries to halt publication of the book, clashing from the start with Kurt. To get Marion away from the distraction, Kurt takes her to a secluded cabin in Maine, where a romance develops between the two, despite the great differences in temperament, tolerance and ambition. The arrival of Nolan, his fiancée, and her father brings matters to a head.

== Cast ==
- Ann Harding as Marion Forsythe
- Robert Montgomery as Richard "Dickie" Kurt
- Edward Everett Horton as Leander 'Bunny' Nolan
- Edward Arnold as Mr. "Feydie" Feydak
- Una Merkel as Slade Kinnicott
- Charles Richman as Mr. Orrin Kinnicott
- Greta Meyer as Minnie
- Willard Robertson as Grigsby
- Donald Meek as Mr. Irish
