= Abraham Lincoln (1930 film) =

1930 film

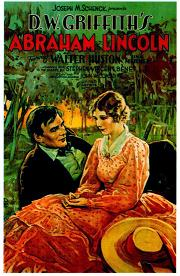
- Directed by: D. W. Griffith
- Written by: Stephen Vincent Benét (adapted for the screen); John W. Considine Jr. (story and production adviser); Stephen Vincent Benét and Gerrit Lloyd (continuity and dialogue)
- Produced by: D. W. Griffith; Joseph M. Schenck
- Starring: Walter Huston; Una Merkel
- Cinematography: Karl Struss
- Edited by: James Smith; Hal C. Kern (editorial adviser)
- Music by: Hugo Riesenfeld (music arrangements)
- Production company: United Artists
- Distributed by: United Artists
- Release date: August 25, 1930
- Running time: 94 minutes
- Country: United States
- Language: English

Abraham Lincoln, also released under the title D. W. Griffith's "Abraham Lincoln", is a 1930 pre-Code American biographical film about Abraham Lincoln directed by D. W. Griffith. It stars Walter Huston as Lincoln and Una Merkel, in her second speaking role, as Ann Rutledge. The script was co-written by Stephen Vincent Benét, author of the Civil War prose poem John Brown's Body (1928), and Gerrit Lloyd. This was the first of only two sound films made by Griffith.

The film entered the public domain in 1958, after its copyright holders failed to renew the copyright in time.

== Synopsis ==
Abraham Lincoln (1930)

The first act of the film covers Lincoln's early life as a storekeeper and rail-splitter in New Salem and his early romance with Ann Rutledge, and his early years as a lawyer and his courtship and marriage to Mary Todd in Springfield, Illinois. The majority of the film deals with Lincoln's presidency during the American Civil War and culminates with Lee's surrender and Lincoln's assassination at Ford's Theatre.

== Cast ==
- W. L. Thorne as Tom Lincoln
- Lucille La Verne as mid-wife
- Helen Freeman as Nancy Hanks Lincoln
- Otto Hoffman as Offut
- Walter Huston as Abraham Lincoln
- Edgar Deering as Armstrong
- Una Merkel as Ann Rutledge
- Russell Simpson as Lincoln's employer
- Charles Crockett as sheriff
- Kay Hammond as Mary Todd Lincoln
- Helen Ware as Mrs. Edwards
- E. Alyn Warren as Stephen A. Douglas
- Jason Robards as Herndon
- Gordon Thorpe as Tad Lincoln
- Ian Keith as John Wilkes Booth
- Cameron Prudhomme as John Hay (secretary to the president)
- James Bradbury, Sr. as General Scott
- Jimmie Eagle as young soldier
- E. Alyn Warren as General Grant
- Oscar Apfel as Secretary of War Stanton
- Frank Campeau as General Sheridan
- Hobart Bosworth as General Lee
- Henry B. Walthall as Colonel Marshall

== Reception ==
The film received positive reviews from contemporary critics. Mordaunt Hall of The New York Times called it "quite a worthy pictorial offering with a genuinely fine and inspiring performance by Walter Huston in the role of the martyred President" and later put it on his year-end list of the ten best films of 1930.

"More than an outstanding classic of sound pictures, Abraham Lincoln eclipses the most conservative illusion of a modernized Birth of a Nation", wrote Variety in a rave review. "It is a startlingly superlative accomplishment; one rejuvenating a greatest Griffith. In characterization and detail perfection it is such as to be almost unbelievable." Film Daily called it a "distinguished and human narrative" and wrote that Huston's performance "may be listed as one of the 10 best of the year – or any talker year."

John Mosher of The New Yorker wrote that it was "by and large.....a pretty high-grade picture." Despite these accolades, however, the film's box office performance was uneven.

== Historical accuracy ==
The film covers some little-known aspects of Lincoln's early life, such as his romance with Ann Rutledge, his depression and feared suicidal tendencies after her death, and his unexplained ending of his engagement with Mary Todd. However, the film surmises that the cause was because of his unresolved feelings over Ann Rutledge, and it adds a dramatic scene in which Lincoln stands Mary up on their scheduled wedding day. In reality, Lincoln ended the engagement before the wedding day. He later had regrets about his decision and returned to ask Mary's hand in marriage, and they were married, as happens in the film.

While the early scenes of Lincoln's life are remarkably accurate, many of the later scenes contain historical inaccuracies. The Lincoln-Douglas debates, in addition to the historically accurate topic of the extension of slavery, are turned into an argument about secession. Lincoln was an underdog for the Republican Presidential nomination in 1860, but the film suggests that he was the sole nominee as a result of the Lincoln-Douglas debates.

The outbreak of the Civil War seems to be the Union firing on Charleston, South Carolina from Fort Sumter rather than the other way around. Also, early in hostilities, General Winfield Scott is depicted as being overconfident of a quick victory and something of a buffoon, but in reality, he was one of the voices in the minority claiming the war would be long, costly, and bloody.

In the film, Lincoln receives a report from the Secret Service that some Copperheads in the North have issued threats against him. However, in reality, the Secret Service was not created until two months after Lincoln's death.

Finally, in the film's climax, Lincoln delivers a conflation of the words of the Gettysburg Address and Second Inaugural Address at Ford's Theatre on April 14, 1865, moments before his assassination. This movie was Griffith's second portrayal of Lincoln's assassination, and the first was in The Birth of a Nation.

== Preservation status ==
Abraham Lincoln is part of the David Wark Griffith collection at the Museum of Modern Art, and it was donated as a gift from screenwriter-producer Paul Killiam, a collector of silent movies. Funding for the preservation of this film was provided by The Lillian Gish Trust for Film Preservation, The Film Foundation, and the Hollywood Foreign Press Association.

== Legacy ==
More recent assessments of Abraham Lincoln have been less effusive in their praise of the film, finding that Abraham Lincoln has not aged well. In 1978, the film was included as one of the choices in the book The Fifty Worst Films of All Time, criticizing the film's historical inaccuracies, instances of clumsy dialogue and Merkel's melodramatic acting style. Glenn Erickson, reviewing the DVD in 2012, wrote that it "comes off as an interesting curio. Its earnest simplicity seems more dated than ever, despite the fine performance of Walter Huston in the lead role."

Film historian Melvyn Stokes found that Abraham Lincoln's episodic structure "came at the cost of dramatic tension" and suggested that the film's disappointing box-office performance was due to its having "nothing of major importance and relevance to say about its subject to moviegoers of Depression-era America." Abraham Lincoln was the first sound film about the Civil War which veterans of that war could view.

== See also ==
- List of films and television shows about the American Civil War
