= Way Down East (1935 film) =

1935 film by Henry King

- Directed by: Henry King
- Written by: Henry Johnson; Patterson McNutt
- Screenplay by: Howard Estabrook; William Hurlbut
- Based on: Way Down East; 1897 play by Lottie Blair Parker
- Produced by: Winfield Sheehan
- Starring: Rochelle Hudson; Henry Fonda
- Cinematography: Ernest Palmer
- Edited by: Robert Bischoff
- Music by: Oscar Bradley
- Production company: Fox Film Corporation
- Distributed by: 20th Century Fox
- Release date: October 16, 1935
- Running time: 80 minutes
- Country: United States
- Language: English

Way Down East is a 1935 American romantic drama film directed by Henry King and starring Rochelle Hudson, Henry Fonda, Slim Summerville, Margaret Hamilton, Andy Devine and Spring Byington. It was released by 20th Century Fox and produced by Fox Film Corporation.

The picture is a remake of the classic 1920 D. W. Griffith silent film Way Down East starring Lillian Gish, which in turn was based on the 1897 stage play by Lottie Blair Parker.

== Plot ==
A starving, impoverished gamin has lost everything after a wicked millionaire tricked her into a marriage and impregnated her. The baby does not survive the ordeal, and the poor girl ends up sheltered by a puritanical farm family. While there, she falls in love with the son.

== Cast ==
- Rochelle Hudson as Anna Moore
- Henry Fonda as David Bartlett
- Slim Summerville as Constable Seth Holcomb
- Edward Trevor as Lennox Sanderson
- Margaret Hamilton as Martha Perkins
- Russell Simpson as Squire Amasa Bartlett
- Andy Devine as Hi Holler
- Spring Byington as Mrs. Louisa Bartlett
- Astrid Allwyn as Kate
- Sara Haden as Cordelia Peabody
- Al Lydell as Hank Woolwine
- Harry C. Bradley as Mr. Peabody
- Phil La Toska as Abner
- Clem Bevans as Doc Wiggin
- Kay Hammond as Mrs. Emma Stackpole
- Tom London as Choir Singer (uncredited)
