= The Hidden Eye =

1945 American mystery film directed by Richard Whorf

- Theatrical release poster
- Directed by: Richard Whorf
- Screenplay by: George Harmon Coxe; Harry Ruskin
- Based on: The Last Express; 1937 novel by Baynard Kendrick
- Produced by: Robert Sisk
- Starring: Edward Arnold; Frances Rafferty; Ray Collins; Paul Langton; William 'Bill' Phillips; Thomas E. Jackson
- Cinematography: Lester White
- Edited by: George Hively
- Music by: David Snell
- Production company: Metro-Goldwyn-Mayer
- Distributed by: Loew's Inc.
- Release date: August 31, 1945
- Running time: 69 minutes
- Country: United States
- Language: English

The Hidden Eye is a 1945 American mystery film directed by Richard Whorf and written by George Harmon Coxe and Harry Ruskin. It is the sequel to the 1942 film Eyes in the Night. The film stars Edward Arnold, Frances Rafferty, Ray Collins, Paul Langton, William 'Bill' Phillips and Thomas E. Jackson. The film was released on August 31, 1945, by Metro-Goldwyn-Mayer.

== Plot ==
A blind detective, Duncan Maclain, with a seeing-eye dog is asked to help by Jean Hampton after a number of mysterious murders are committed, including ones of her wealthy father and uncle. Jean's fiancé, Barry Gifford, falls under suspicion at first, but Maclain and bodyguard Marty Corbett ultimately conclude that a family lawyer, Treadway, is masterminding a murder and moneymaking scheme. Gifford is about to be framed for the killings when Maclain solves it, after which the detective is asked to be best man at Jean's wedding.

== Cast ==
- Edward Arnold as Capt. Duncan Maclain
- Frances Rafferty as Jean Hampton
- Ray Collins as Phillip Treadway
- Paul Langton as Barry Gifford
- William 'Bill' Phillips as Marty Corbett
- Thomas E. Jackson as Insp. Delaney
- Morris Ankrum as Ferris
- Robert Lewis as Stormvig
- Francis Pierlot as Kossovsky
- Sondra Rodgers as Helen Roberts
- Theodore Newton as Gibbs
- Jack Lambert as Louie
- Raymond Largay as Arthur Hampton
- Leigh Whipper as Alistair
- Byron Foulger as Burton Lorrison
- Lee Phelps as Polasky
- Eddie Acuff as Whitey
- Audrey Totter as Perfume Saleslady (uncredited)
- Bob Pepper as Sgt. Kramer
- Clyde Fillmore as Rodney Hampton
- Friday as himself
