= Edward Arnold (actor) =

American actor (1890–1956)

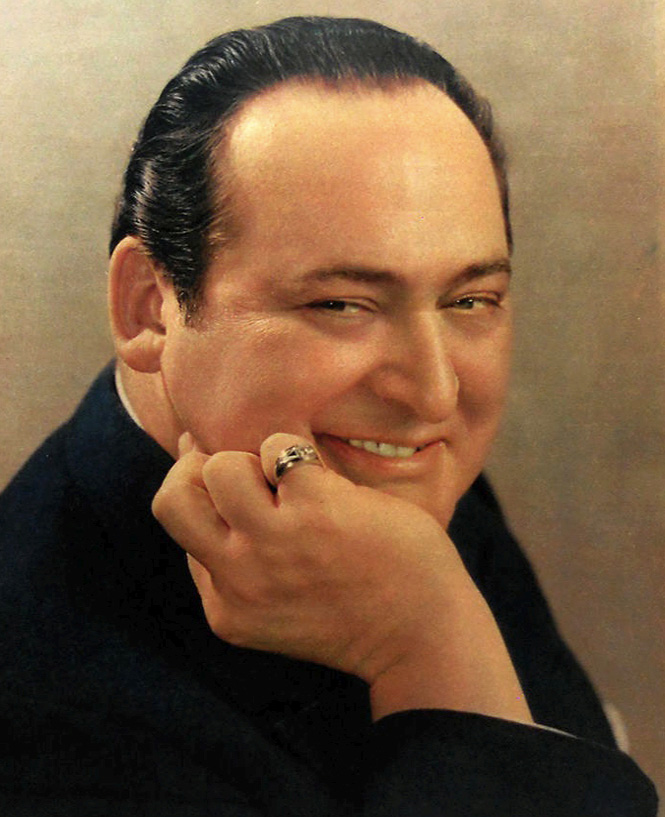
- Arnold in 1941
- Born: Günther Edward Arnold Schneider; February 18, 1890; New York City, U.S.
- Died: April 26, 1956 (aged 66); Encino, California, U.S.
- Resting place: San Fernando Mission Cemetery
- Occupation: Actor
- Years active: 1907–1956
- Spouses: Harriet Marshall (m. 1917; div. 1927) Olive Emerson (m. 1929; div. 1949) Cleo McLain (m. 1951)
- Children: 3

President of the Screen Actors Guild
- In office 1940–1942
- Preceded by: Ralph Morgan
- Succeeded by: James Cagney

Günther Edward Arnold Schneider (February 18, 1890 – April 26, 1956) was an American actor of the stage and screen.

== Early life ==
Arnold was born on February 18, 1890, in the Lower East Side of New York City, the son of German immigrants Elizabeth (née Ohse) and Carl Schneider. His schooling came at the East Side Settlement House.

== Acting career ==
=== Stage ===
Arnold was interested in acting ever since he appeared on stage as Lorenzo in The Merchant of Venice at age 12. He made his professional stage debut in 1907 and had important roles in several plays on Broadway in the 1920s and 1930s. Among them is the 1927 revival of The Jazz Singer, with Arnold as the second lead to the star, George Jessel.

=== Film ===
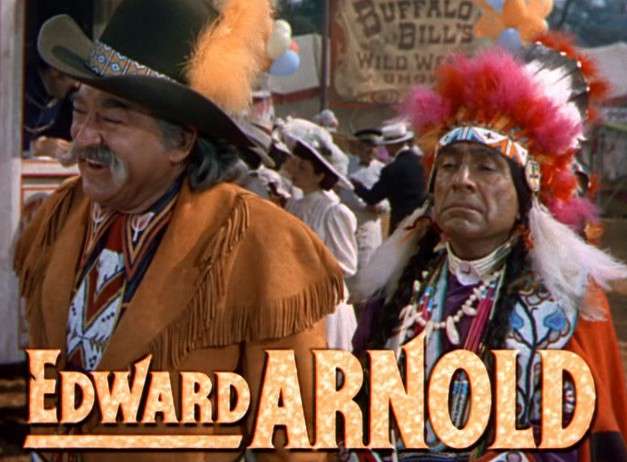
Arnold (left) with J. Carrol Naish; from the trailer for Annie Get Your Gun (1950)

He found work as an extra for Essanay Studios and World Studios, before landing his first significant role in 1916's The Misleading Lady. He returned to the stage in 1919, and did not appear in movies again until his talkie debut in Okay America! (1932). He recreated one of his stage roles in one of his early films, Whistling in the Dark (1933). His role in the 1935 film Diamond Jim boosted him to stardom. He reprised the role of Diamond Jim Brady in the 1940 film Lillian Russell. He played a similar role in The Toast of New York (1937), another fictionalized version of real-life business chicanery, for which he was billed above Cary Grant on posters, with his name in much larger letters.

Arnold appeared in over 150 movies. Although he was labeled "box office poison" in 1938 by an exhibitor publication (he shared this dubious distinction with Joan Crawford, Greta Garbo, Marlene Dietrich, Mae West, Fred Astaire and Katharine Hepburn), he never lacked work. Rather than continue in leading man roles, he gave up losing weight and went after character parts instead. He said, "The bigger I got, the better character roles I received." He was so sought-after, he often worked on two pictures at once.

Arnold was expert as rogues and authority figures, and superb at combining the two as powerful villains quietly pulling strings. He was best known for his roles in Come and Get It (1936), Sutter's Gold (1936), the aforementioned The Toast of New York (1937), You Can't Take It with You (1938), Mr. Smith Goes to Washington (1939), Meet John Doe (1941), and a larger than life star turn as Daniel Webster in The Devil and Daniel Webster (1941). He was the first to portray Rex Stout's famous detective Nero Wolfe, starring in Meet Nero Wolfe (1936), based on the first novel in the series.

He played blind detective Duncan Maclain in two movies based on the novels by Baynard Kendrick, Eyes in the Night (1942) and The Hidden Eye (1945).

Leonard Maltin stated, "Few character actors achieved the particular kind of stardom that came to Edward Arnold in the 1930s, playing historical figures and dynamic, larger-than-life characters. Burly and round-faced, with piercing eyes and sharp nose, Arnold was a commanding presence." Leslie Halliwell called him "Rotund but dynamic actor who played go-getter leading roles in the thirties. Although he later became typed as kindly father/apoplectic business man, he never lost his popularity." Halliwell further praised him "For maintaining an ebullient star personality through two decades of talkies, despite his unromantic physique."

An image of Arnold made a posthumous appearance in the 1984 film Gremlins as the deceased husband (visible in a large framed photograph) of Mrs. Deagle, a character much like the rich, heartless characters Arnold was known for. Director Joe Dante mentioned that they received permission from Arnold's family to use his image.

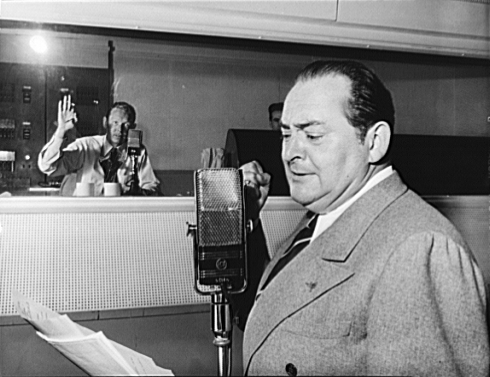
Arnold on the radio show Three Thirds of a Nation, May 6, 1942

=== Radio ===
From 1947 to 1953, Arnold starred in the ABC radio program Mr. President. He also played a lawyer, Mr. Reynolds, on The Charlotte Greenwood Show. In 1953, he hosted Spotlight Story on the Mutual network.

=== Television ===
Arnold hosted Your Star Showcase, "a series of 52 half-hour television dramas ... released by Television Programs of America." It was launched January 1, 1954, and ran in 150 cities. He co-starred in "Ever Since the Day", an episode of Ford Theatre on NBC.

== Personal life ==
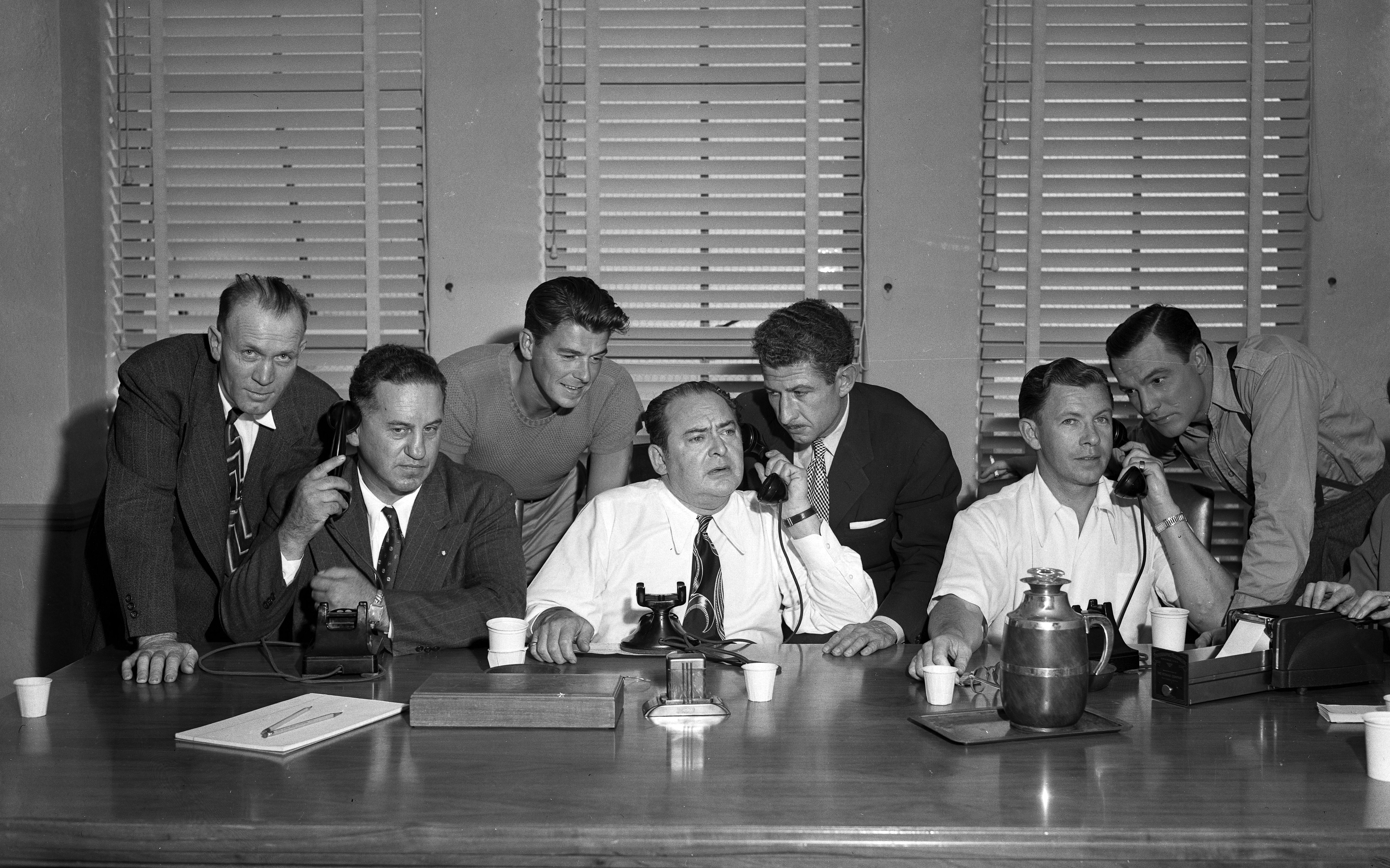
Seven actors and studio workers during a telephone conference held in the aftermath of Hollywood Black Friday in which American Federation of Labor officials denied issuing a "clarification" which set off the film strike, October 26, 1946. (L-R): James Skelton, Herbert Sorrell, Ronald Reagan, Edward Arnold, Roy Tindall, George Murphy, and Gene Kelly.

Arnold was married three times: to Harriet Marshall (1917–1927), with whom he had three children—Elizabeth, Jane, and William (who had a short movie career as Edward Arnold Jr.); to Olive Emerson (1929–1948), and to Cleo McLain (1951 until his death).

Arnold supported Thomas Dewey in the 1944 United States presidential election.

Arnold died at his home in Encino, California, at age 66, from a cerebral hemorrhage associated with atrial fibrillation. He was interred in the San Fernando Mission Cemetery.

== Recognition ==
Midwestern University awarded Arnold the honorary degree of Doctor of Letters (D.Litt) on May 24, 1951. He received a star on the Hollywood Walk of Fame at 6225 Hollywood Boulevard in the recording category on February 8, 1960.

== Filmography ==
Year	Film	Role	Director	Notes
1916	The Misleading Lady	Sidney Parker	Arthur Berthelet	
1916	The Strange Case of Mary Page	Dr. Foster	J. Charles Haydon	Lost film
1916	Vultures of Society	Joseph Gripp		
1916	Sherlock Holmes	Moriarty Henchman In Striped Cap	Arthur Berthelet; William Postance (assistant director)	uncredited
1916	The Return of Eve	Seymour Purchwell		
1917	The Slacker's Heart	Frank Allen		
1917	The Wide, Wrong Way	Hugh Chilvers	E.H. Calvert	Essanay Studios
1919	Phil for Short	Tom Wentworth	Oscar Apfel	
1919	A Broadway Saint	Mr. Frewen	Harry O. Hoyt	
1920	The Cost	Hampden Scarborough	Harley Knoles	Lost film
1932	Murder in the Pullman	Nick Valentine		Short
1932	Okay, America!	Duke Morgan	Tay Garnett	
1932	Three on a Match	Ace	Mervyn LeRoy	
1932	Afraid to Talk	Jig Skelli	Edward L. Cahn	
1932	Rasputin and the Empress	Dr A. Remezov	Richard Boleslawski	
1933	Whistling in the Dark	Dillon	Charles Reisner	
1933	The White Sister	Father Saracinesca	Victor Fleming	
1933	The Barbarian	Pasha Achmed	Sam Wood	
1933	The Life of Jimmy Dolan	Inspector Ennis	Archie Mayo	uncredited
1933	Jennie Gerhardt	Sen. Brander	Marion Gering	
1933	Secret of the Blue Room	Commissioner Forster	Kurt Neumann	
1933	Her Bodyguard	Orson Bitzer	William Beaudine	
1933	I'm No Angel	"Big Bill" Barton	Wesley Ruggles	
1933	Duck Soup	Politician	Leo McCarey	uncredited
1933	Roman Scandals	Emperor Valerius	Frank Tuttle	
1934	Madame Spy	Schultz	Karl Freund	
1934	Sadie McKee	Jack Brennan	Clarence Brown	
1934	Unknown Blonde	Frank Rodie	Hobart Henley	
1934	Thirty Day Princess	Richard M. Gresham	Marion Gering	
1934	Hide-Out	Det. Lt. 'Mac' MacCarthy	W.S. Van Dyke	
1934	Million Dollar Ransom	Vincent Shelton	Murray Roth	
1934	Wednesday's Child	Ray Phillips	John S. Robertson; Ray Lissner (assistant)	
1934	The President Vanishes	Secretary of War Lewis Wardell	William A. Wellman	
1935	Biography of a Bachelor Girl	Mr. 'Feydie' Feydak	Edward H. Griffith	
1935	Cardinal Richelieu	Louis XIII	Rowland V. Lee	
1935	The Glass Key	Paul Madvig	Frank Tuttle	
1935	Diamond Jim	Diamond Jim Brady	A. Edward Sutherland	
1935	Remember Last Night?	Danny Harrison	James Whale	
1935	Crime and Punishment	Insp. Porfiry	Josef von Sternberg	
1935	Sutter's Gold	John Sutter	James Cruze	
1936	Meet Nero Wolfe	Nero Wolfe	Herbert Biberman	
1936	Come and Get It	Barney Glasgow	William Wyler	
1937	John Meade's Woman	John Meade	Richard Wallace	
1937	Easy Living	J.B. Ball	Mitchell Leisen	
1937	The Toast of New York	Jim Fisk	Rowland V. Lee	
1937	Blossoms on Broadway	Ira Collins	Richard Wallace	
1938	The Crowd Roars	Jim Cain	Richard Thorpe	
1938	You Can't Take It with You	Anthony P. Kirby	Frank Capra	
1939	Idiot's Delight	Achille Weber	Clarence Brown	
1939	Let Freedom Ring	Jim Knox	Jack Conway	
1939	Man About Town	Sir John Arlington	Mark Sandrich	
1939	Mr. Smith Goes to Washington	Jim Taylor	Frank Capra	
1939	Slightly Honorable	Vincent Cushing	Tay Garnett; Charles Kerr (assistant)	
1940	The Earl of Chicago	Quentin 'Doc' Ramsey	Richard Thorpe	
1940	Johnny Apollo	Robert Cain Sr.	Henry Hathaway	
1940	Lillian Russell	Diamond Jim Brady	Irving Cummings	
1941	The Penalty	Martin 'Stuff' Nelson	Harold S. Bucquet	
1941	The Lady from Cheyenne	James 'Jim' Cork	Frank Lloyd	
1941	Meet John Doe	D.B. Norton	Frank Capra	
1941	Nothing but the Truth	T.T. Ralson	Elliott Nugent	
1941	The Devil and Daniel Webster	Daniel Webster	William Dieterle	
1941	Unholy Partners	Merrill Lambert	Mervyn LeRoy	
1941	Johnny Eager	John Benson Farrell	Mervyn LeRoy	
1941	Design for Scandal	Judson M. Blair	Norman Taurog	
1942	The War Against Mrs. Hadley	Elliott Fulton	Harold S. Bucquet	
1942	Eyes in the Night	Duncan 'Mac' Maclain	Fred Zinnemann	
1943	The Youngest Profession	Burton V. Lyons	Edward Buzzell	
1944	Standing Room Only	T. J. Todd	Sidney Lanfield	
1944	Janie	Charles Conway	Michael Curtiz	
1944	Kismet	The Grand Vizier	William Dieterle	
1944	Mrs. Parkington	Amory Stilham	Tay Garnett	
1945	Main Street After Dark	Lt. Lorrgan	Edward L. Cahn	
1945	Ziegfeld Follies	Lawyer	George Sidney	'Pay the Two Dollars'
1945	The Hidden Eye	Capt. Duncan Maclain	Richard Whorf	
1945	Week-End at the Waldorf	Martin X. Edley	Robert Z. Leonard	
1946	Janie Gets Married	Charles Conway	Vincent Sherman	
1946	Three Wise Fools	Theodore Findley	Edward Buzzell	
1946	No Leave, No Love	Hobart Canford Stiles	Charles Martin	
1947	The Mighty McGurk	Mike Glenson	John Waters	
1947	My Brother Talks to Horses	Mr. Bledsoe	Fred Zinnemann	
1947	Dear Ruth	Judge Harry Wilkins	William D. Russell	
1947	The Hucksters	David 'Dave' Lash	Jack Conway	
1948	Three Daring Daughters	Robert Nelson	Fred M. Wilcox	
1948	Big City	Judge Martin O. Abercrombie	Norman Taurog	
1948	Wallflower	Andrew J. Linnett	Frederick de Cordova	
1948	Command Decision	Congressman Arthur Malcolm	Sam Wood	
1949	John Loves Mary	Sen. James McKinley	David Butler	
1949	Take Me Out to the Ballgame	Joe Lorgan	Busby Berkeley	
1949	Big Jack	Mayor Mahoney	Richard Thorpe	
1949	Dear Wife	Judge Harry Wilkins	Richard Haydn	
1950	The Yellow Cab Man	Martin Creavy	Jack Donohue	
1950	Annie Get Your Gun	Pawnee Bill	Charles Walters	
1950	The Skipper Surprised His Wife	Adm. Homer Thorndyke	Elliott Nugent	
1951	Dear Brat	Senator Wilkins	William A. Seiter	
1952	Belles on Their Toes	Sam Harper	Henry Levin	
1953	City That Never Sleeps	Penrod Biddel	John H. Auer	
1953	Man of Conflict	J.R. Compton	Hal R. Makelim	
1954	Living It Up	The Mayor	Norman Taurog	
1954	Studio One	Juror No. 10	Franklin J. Schaffner	"Twelve Angry Men" (TV episode)
1956	The Houston Story	Paul Atlas	William Castle	
1956	The Ambassador's Daughter	Ambassador William Fisk	Norman Krasna	Posthumous release
1956	Miami Exposé	Oliver Tubbs	Fred F. Sears	Posthumous release (final film role)

== Radio appearances ==
Year	Program	Episode/source
1942	Philip Morris Playhouse	The Maltese Falcon
