= Script analyst =

A script analyst, script reader, or story analyst is an individual who reads a film script to determine the material's desirable and undesirable characteristics as relates to story and film production. This information is often useful for judging the quality of a script, and analysts often provide feedback and suggestions for improving it.
