= Lone Wolf =

A lone wolf is a wolf not belonging to a pack.

Lone wolf, Lone Wolf, The Lone Wolf, or Lone Wolves, may also refer to:

== Law and politics ==
- Lone wolf terrorism, terrorism planned and committed by a single person
- Lone Wolf v. Hitchcock, a United States Supreme Court case

== Literature ==
- Lone Wolf, a book by Kathryn Lasky, part of the series called Wolves of the Beyond
- The Lone Wolf, a 1914 novel by Louis Joseph Vance
- Lone Wolf (character) or Michael Lanyard, a character in a series of detective books by Louis Joseph Vance
- “Lone Wolf”, the field name of fictional character John Rambo
- Lone Wolf, a book by Maryanne Vollers about bomber Eric Robert Rudolph
- Lone Wolf (gamebooks), a series of gamebooks created by Joe Dever
- Lone Wolf (Shadowrun novel), a 1994 novel with the atmosphere of the role-playing game Shadowrun, published by Roc Books
- Lone Wolf (Jabotinsky biography), a 1996 biography of Ze'ev Jabotinsky
- Lone Wolf (Muchamore novel), 2014
- Lone Wolf (Picoult novel), 2012
- Lone Wolf and Cub, a 1970 Japanese graphic novel

== Music ==
- Lone Wolf (Hank Williams Jr. album), 1990
- Lone Wolf (Michael Martin Murphey album), 1978
- "Lone Wolf", a song by Eels from Shootenanny!
- "Lone Wolf", a song by Eric Church from Heart & Soul
- "Lone Wolf", a song by Corey Hart from Young Man Running
- "Lone Wolf", the theme tune for videogame character Guile
- "Lone Wolf", a song by Judas Priest from Firepower
- "Lone Wolf", a song by Madi Diaz from Fatal Optimist
- Lone Wolf Management, a record label run by Karl Wolf
- "Lonewolf", a song by Running Wild from Blazon Stone
- "Lone Wolves", a song by Paris Hilton

== Film, TV, and games ==
- Lone Wolf, a masked character in the video game Resident Evil: Operation Raccoon City
- Lone Wolf, a pickpocket in the video game Final Fantasy VI
- The Lone Wolf, a 1917 American silent film based on the 1914 novel of the same name by Louis Joseph Vance
- The Lone Wolf (1924 film), another adaptation of the Vance novel
- The Lone Wolf (1952 film), a Mexican western film directed by Vicente Oroná
- Lone Wolf (1978 film), a Soviet film
- Lone Wolf (2021 film), an Australian science fiction drama thriller film
- Lone Wolf (2026 film), a Czech war docudrama.
- The Lone Wolf (TV series), a 1954 television series based on Vance's character, featuring Louis Hayward
- Lone Wolves (adventure), 1984 tabletop roleplaying game
- Lone Wolf: The Roleplaying Game, published in 2005
- Lone Wolf McQuade, a 1983 film starring Chuck Norris
- Joe Dever's Lone Wolf, a 2013 video game

== People ==
- Lone Wolf [the Elder] (1820–1879), Guipago, last Principal Chief of the Kiowa tribe
- Lone Wolf the Younger (c. 1843–1923), Kiowa leader
- Lone Wolf, the Blackfoot name of artist Hart Merriam Schultz
- Ted Lone Wolf (fl. 1922–1923), American football player
- The Lone Wolf, Scott Hall, American professional wrestler
- Lone Wolf, nickname of Baron Corbin, American professional wrestler

== Places ==
- Lone Wolf, Oklahoma

== See also ==
- Wolfpack (disambiguation)
- List of lone wolf terrorist attacks
- Plausible deniability
- Stochastic terrorism
