= The Lone Wolf Spy Hunt =

1939 film by Peter Godfrey

- Theatrical release poster
- Directed by: Peter Godfrey
- Screenplay by: Jonathan Latimer
- Produced by: Joseph Sistrom
- Starring: Warren William; Ida Lupino
- Cinematography: Allen G. Siegler
- Edited by: Otto Meyer
- Music by: Morris Stoloff
- Production company: Columbia Pictures
- Distributed by: Columbia Pictures
- Release date: January 27, 1939
- Running time: 71 minutes
- Country: United States
- Language: English

The Lone Wolf Spy Hunt is a 1939 American adventure film directed by Peter Godfrey and written by Jonathan Latimer. The film stars Warren William and Ida Lupino and was released by Columbia Pictures, on January 27, 1939.

The Lone Wolf character dates back to 1914, when author Louis Joseph Vance invented him for a series of books, later adapted to twenty-four Lone Wolf films (1917–1949). Warren William starred in nine of these films (1939–1943), with The Lone Wolf Spy Hunt being the first starring William as Michael Lanyard. His next film was The Lone Wolf Strikes, in 1940.

== Plot ==
Michael Lanyard, the "Lone Wolf," is kidnapped off a Washington, D.C. street and taken to a man whose face is hidden in darkness. The mystery man offers Lanyard a job: breaking into a safe. When Lanyard declines, he is released unharmed. Afterward, a puzzled henchman named Jenks states they can open the safe without help. His boss reveals that he has "an old score to settle with the Lone Wolf."

The plans for the new Palmer anti-aircraft gun are stolen from the War Department and a cigarette deliberately left to incriminate Lanyard. However, the thieves did not get all of the plans. Palmer kept the key parts. Police Inspector Thomas knows Lanyard, one of the few capable of doing the job, is long retired and it is an obvious frameup, but is eager to seize any opportunity to try to jail him anyway. Lanyard has an alibi though; he was having lunch with blonde singer Marie Templeton.

At home, Lanyard has woman trouble. A widower, he tells his young daughter Patricia that he is sending her away to school, while his pretty heiress girlfriend Val Carson is fuming because he left her at lunch to take a phone call and did not come back. Inspector Thomas and Sergeant Devan question him, then leave.

At a bar, Lanyard meets Karen, much to Val's disgust. Lanyard accompanies Karen and is forcibly taken to Palmer Laboratories to steal the rest of the plans. He escapes, opens the safe, takes the plans from an envelope, replaces them with one for a baby carriage and reseals the envelope. Then he allows himself to be recaptured. He opens the safe and allows the spies to take the envelope. They let him go, certain that the police will arrest him.

Lanyard entrusts the documents to Senator Carson, Val's father, while he tries to clear himself. He discovers that Karen is associated with someone named Gregory. He crashes Gregory's masquerade party, improvising a costume and stealing an invitation from a drunk. He triggers the burglar alarm, then watches undetected as Gregory, his vengeful nemesis, opens his concealed safe to check if his share of the plans is still there. Lanyard then steals the plans, but is caught. He runs into two policemen, brought by the drunk, and escapes. When he gets home, he learns that Jenks has stolen his part of the plans from the senator.

With a tight deadline, Karen asks Lanyard to join forces with Gregory, but is rejected. Patricia sneaks into the trunk of Karen's car and is later discovered. Lanyard goes after her to Gregory's house and is captured with his half of the plans. When Val is unable to convince Thomas to accompany her to Gregory's place, she goes there alone and is easily caught. The police spot Lanyard's car at Gregory's place and arrive in time to save everyone.

== Cast ==
- Warren William as Michael Lanyard
- Ida Lupino as Val Carson
- Rita Hayworth as Karen
- Virginia Weidler as Patricia
- Ralph Morgan as Spiro
- Tom Dugan as Sergeant Devan
- Don Beddoe as Inspector Thomas
- Leonard Carey as Jameson
- Ben Welden as Jenks
- Brandon Tynan as Senator Carson
- Helen Lynd as Marie Templeton
- Landers Stevens as Thacher
- James Craig as Party Guest (uncredited)
- Bud Jamison as Bartender (uncredited)

== See also ==
Other Warren William Lone Wolf films:

- The Lone Wolf Strikes (1940)
- The Lone Wolf Meets a Lady (1940)
- The Lone Wolf Keeps a Date (1940)
- The Lone Wolf Takes a Chance (1941)
- Secrets of the Lone Wolf (1941)
- Counter-Espionage (1942)
- One Dangerous Night (1943)
- Passport to Suez (1943)
