= The Lone Wolf Returns =

The Lone Wolf Returns is a 1923 crime novel by Louis Joseph Vance which was the basis of two movies:

- The Lone Wolf Returns (1926 film), featuring Bert Lytell
- The Lone Wolf Returns (1935 film), starring Melvyn Douglas
