= The Lone Wolf's Daughter =

The Lone Wolf's Daughter is the title of two films whose protagonist is Michael Lanyard, the Lone Wolf:

- The Lone Wolf's Daughter (1919 film), starring Bertram Grassby
- The Lone Wolf's Daughter (1929 film), featuring Bert Lytell
