= The Spanish Jade =

The Spanish Jade may refer to:

- The Spanish Jade (1922 film), a British silent drama film
- The Spanish Jade (1915 film), an American drama silent film
