= Roger Gray (actor) =

American actor (1881–1959)

- Born: May 26, 1881; Omaha, Nebraska, United States
- Died: January 20, 1959 (aged 77); Los Angeles, California, United States
- Occupation: Actor
- Years active: 1930–1943

Roger Gray (May 26, 1881 – January 20, 1959) was an American character who was active in the early years of the talking picture era. Born in Omaha, Nebraska in 1881, he began acting later in life, his first role being featured part in 1930's Hit the Deck. Over his 14-year career he would have small or featured roles in over 75 films, including such classics as The Merry Widow (1934), Les Misérables (1935), Captains Courageous (1937), The Adventures of Huckleberry Finn (1939), and 1940's Road to Singapore. His final appearance would be in a small role in the 1943 film Redhead from Manhattan. Married and divorced twice, he died in a Los Angeles hospital, and his body was cremated in the crematorium of Hollywood Memorial Cemetery (now Hollywood Forever Cemetery).

== Filmography ==
(Per AFI database)

- Hit the Deck (1930)
- A Wicked Woman (1934)
- Come on Marines! (1934)
- George White's Scandals (1934)
- We Live Again (1934)
- Lightning Strikes Twice (1934)
- The Merry Frinks (1934)
- The Merry Widow (1934)
- Jealousy (1934)
- White Lies (1934)
- Wild Gold (1934)
- Mills of the Gods (1934)
- The Captain Hates the Sea (1934)
- Naughty Marietta (1935)
- Barbary Coast (1935)
- The Whole Town's Talking (1935)
- Les Misérables (1935)
- Ship Cafe (1935)
- The Case of the Lucky Legs (1935)
- Don't Bet on Blondes (1935)
- Mary Jane's Pa (1935)
- The Lone Wolf Returns (1935)
- Mad Love (1935)
- Murder in the Fleet (1935)
- I'll Love You Always (1935)
- Behind the Evidence (1935)
- The Girl Friend (1935)
- Men of the Hour (1935)
- The Public Menace (1935)
- Rebellion (1936)
- Oh, Susanna! (1936)
- Fury (1936) as Stranger
- The King Steps Out (1936)
- A Son Comes Home (1936)
- Everyman's Law (1936)
- Wives Never Know (1936)
- Gentle Julia (1936)
- The Singing Kid (1936)
- Killer at Large (1936)
- Captains Courageous (1937) as Nate Rogers (uncredited)
- Wild and Woolly (1937)
- A Dangerous Adventure (1937)
- Parole Racket (1937)
- Merry-Go-Round of 1938 (1937)
- Woman Chases Man (1937)
- Double Wedding (1937)
- City Streets (1938)
- Barefoot Boy (1938)
- Swing Your Lady (1938)
- You and Me (1938)
- The Arkansas Traveler (1938)
- The Lone Wolf in Paris (1938)
- The Adventures of Huckleberry Finn (1939)
- The Magnificent Fraud (1939)
- Those High Grey Walls (1939)
- My Son Is Guilty (1939)
- Outpost of the Mounties (1939)
- Torchy Blane in Chinatown (1939)
- Disputed Passage (1939)
- The Lady's from Kentucky (1939)
- Burn 'Em Up O'Connor (1939)
- Buck Benny Rides Again (1940)
- Road to Singapore (1940)
- The Westerner (1940)
- Out West with the Peppers (1940)
- The Secret Seven (1940)
- The Lone Wolf Meets a Lady (1940)
- Adventure in Diamonds (1940)
- The Durango Kid (1940)
- The Big Boss (1941)
- The Lady from Cheyenne (1941)
- The Pinto Kid (1941)
- You Belong to Me (1941)
- Pardon My Gun (1942)
- Tennessee Johnson (1942)
- The Man Who Returned to Life (1942)
- Redhead from Manhattan (1943)
