= The Lone Wolf's Daughter (1919 film) =

1919 silent film directed by William P.S. Earle

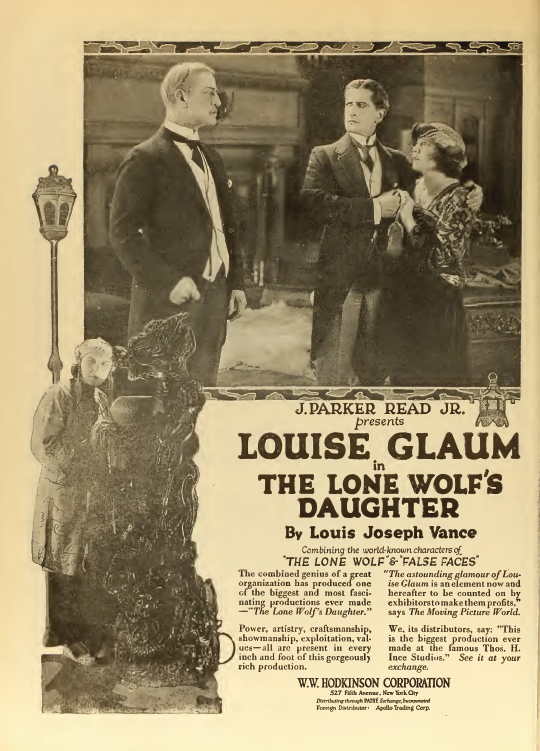
- Ad for film
- Directed by: William P. S. Earle
- Written by: Louis Joseph Vance
- Produced by: J. Parker Read, Jr.
- Starring: Bertram Grassby; Louise Glaum; Thomas Holding
- Cinematography: Charles J. Stumar
- Edited by: Ralph Dixon
- Production company: Thomas H. Ince
- Distributed by: W. W. Hodkinson Corporation; Pathé Exchange
- Release date: December 21, 1919
- Running time: 70 minutes (7 reels)
- Country: United States
- Language: Silent (English intertitles)

The Lone Wolf's Daughter is a surviving 1919 American silent era crime/drama/thriller motion picture starring Bertram Grassby, Louise Glaum, and Thomas Holding.

Directed by William P.S. Earle and produced by J. Parker Read Jr., the screenplay and the intertitles were adapted by Louis Joseph Vance based on his novels about the Lone Wolf, a jewel thief turned private detective.

Filmed at Thomas H. Ince Studios in Culver City, The Lone Wolf's Daughter was billed as the sequel to The Lone Wolf (1917) and The False Faces (1919). The movie premiered in Chicago. It was not exhibited in Los Angeles until January 12, 1920.

Glaum was acknowledged as a fashion plate for "wearing at least fifty different and striking gowns."

== Plot ==
In London, England, Princess Sonia and her husband, the exiled Russian nobleman Prince Victor, are attending an art auction. They are bidding against each other for a landscape painting by Jean-Baptiste-Camille Corot; hidden behind the painting are incriminating letters written by Princess Sonia. Michael Lanyard, the mysterious international thief known as the "Lone Wolf", wins the painting.

After the auction, Lanyard removes the letters from the painting and gives then to Princess Sonia. She later divorces Victor and marries Lanyard. With malevolent hatred, Victor threatens to follow Lanyard "to the very gates of Hell". Lanyard replies, "If you do, then I'll push you inside." Princess Sonia dies after giving birth to her and Lanyard's daughter, Sonia. However, he is unaware of her existence.

Years later, Sonia has grown up without knowledge of her parentage or past. She believes herself to be the daughter of Princess Sonia's maid. Victor, now the leader of an gang of Asian criminals and Bolsheviks, eventually finds Sonia. Telling her that he is her father, he brings the girl to his home, hoping that will entice Lanyard to make an appearance. Sonia then falls in love with Roger Karslake, Victor's secretary.

Sonia learns of the gang's plan to pump poisonous gas into the Houses of Parliament, 10 Downing Street and Buckingham Palace. The object is to kill the government leaders and make Victor dictator of England. Sonia reveals the plot to Karslake.

Unknown to Sonia or Victor, Lanyard has been secretly working in Victor's house as the butler; both he and Karslake are Scotland Yard agents. Lanyard and Sonia finally learn that they are father and daughter. Lanyard and Karslake capture Victor's gang amidst a blazing house fire and a huge fight, thwarting the gas attack. Lanyard then chases Victor to the roof and shoves him into the fire.

== Cast ==
- Bertram Grassby as Michael Lanyard, the Lone Wolf
- Louise Glaum as both Princess Sonia and her daughter, Sonia
- Edwin Stevens as Prince Victor
- Thomas Holding as Roger Karslake
- Fred L. Wilson (Undetermined role)
- Wallace Beery (Undetermined role) (uncredited)

== Reviews ==
A Los Angeles Times review of Saturday, January 11, 1920, reads:

Louise Glaum's now starring feature, "The Lone Wolf's Daughter," comes to Tally's Broadway Theater, tomorrow, Louis Joseph Vance was the author of the original story and J. Parker Read, Jr., the producer. The supporting cast is notable, including Edwin Stevens, Thomas Holding, Bertram Grassby, and many others. The scene of the story is London with a panorama of coloring, ranging from the magnificence of Buckingham Palace to the mysterious depths of the shadowy Limehouse district. The author personally arranged the scenario for Mr. Read, the producer. Much of the action takes place in Soho, the French quarter of London, where Sonia (Louise Glaum) who knows nothing of her parentage or past, is the attraction for the curious slumming parties. The plot centers about Sonia's captivity in the house of a celebrated crook, her discovery of mysterious maneuverings to poison all London, and the intense climax which follows directly after her recognition of her father, "The Lone Wolf", who has been working, unknown to her or by her, in the same household. In the play Miss Glaum incidentally reveals her talents as a fashion plate, wearing at least fifty different and striking gowns.

== See also ==
- List of American films of 1919
