= Secrets of the Lone Wolf =

1941 film

- Film poster
- Directed by: Edward Dmytryk
- Written by: Stuart Palmer; Louis Joseph Vance
- Produced by: Jack Fier
- Starring: Warren William; Ruth Ford; Roger Clark
- Cinematography: Philip Tannura
- Edited by: Richard Fantl
- Music by: Morris Stoloff
- Production company: Columbia Pictures
- Distributed by: Columbia Pictures
- Release date: November 13, 1941
- Running time: 66 minutes
- Country: United States
- Language: English

Secrets of the Lone Wolf is a 1941 American mystery crime film directed by Edward Dmytryk and starring Warren William, Ruth Ford and Roger Clark. It is part of the series of Lone Wolf films released by Columbia Pictures. His next film was Counter-Espionage, released in 1942.

== Cast ==
- Warren William as Michael Lanyard
- Ruth Ford as Helene de Leon
- Roger Clark as Paul Benoit
- Victor Jory as 'Dapper' Dan Streever
- Eric Blore as Jamison the Butler
- Thurston Hall as Inspector Crane
- Fred Kelsey as Detective Sergeant Wesley Dickens
- Victor Kilian as Colonel Costals
- Marlo Dwyer as 'Bubbles' Deegan
- Lester Scharff as Deputy Duval
- Irving Mitchell as Mr. Evans, financier
- John Harmon as Uptown Bernie, alias Bernard the Steward
- Joe McGuinn as Bob McGarth, Private Detective

== Bibliography ==
- Fetrow, Alan G. Feature Films, 1940-1949: a United States Filmography. McFarland, 1994.
