= Greater Than Marriage =

1924 film

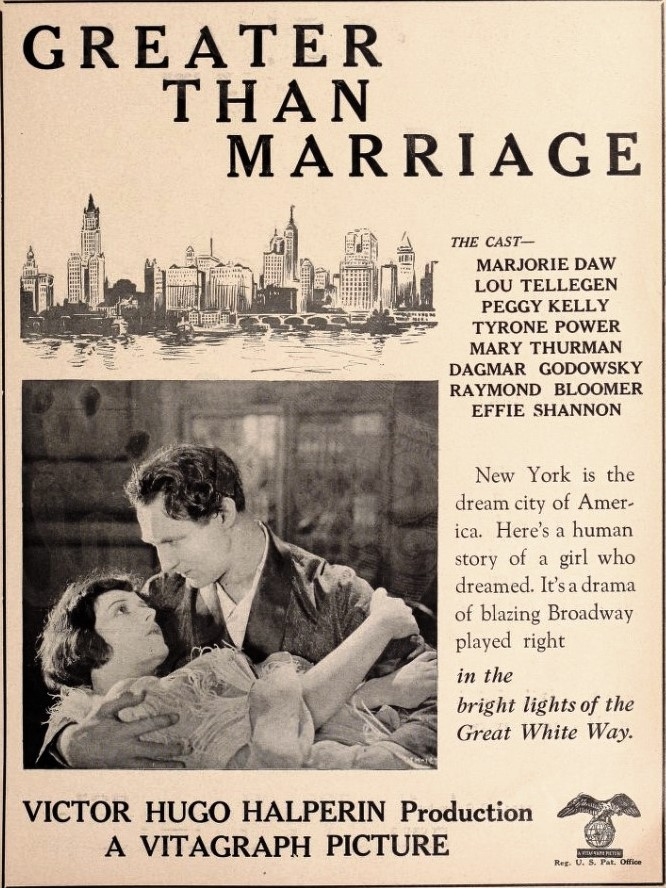
- Advertisement
- Directed by: Victor Halperin
- Written by: Victor Halperin
- Based on: Joan Thursday by Louis Joseph Vance
- Starring: Marjorie Daw; Lou Tellegen; Tyrone Power Sr.
- Cinematography: Edward Paul; Carl Vanderbroch
- Production company: Romance Pictures
- Distributed by: Vitagraph Company of America
- Release date: November 16, 1924
- Running time: 70 minutes
- Country: United States
- Language: Silent (English intertitles)

Greater Than Marriage is a 1924 American silent drama film directed by Victor Halperin and starring Marjorie Daw, Lou Tellegen, and Tyrone Power Sr.

== Cast ==
- Marjorie Daw as Joan Thursday
- Lou Tellegen as John Masters
- Peggy Kelly as Maizie de Noovan
- Tyrone Power Sr. as Father
- Mary Thurman as Venetia
- Dagmar Godowsky as Nella Gardrow
- Raymond Bloomer as Vincent Marbridge
- Effie Shannon as Mother
- Florence Billings as Aunt Helena
- William Ricciardi as Sam Goldman
- Edward Roseman as Charlie Quan

== Preservation ==
A film collector reportedly has an abridged or incomplete print of Greater Than Marriage.

== Bibliography ==
- Goble, Alan. The Complete Index to Literary Sources in Film. Walter de Gruyter, 1999.
