= The Lone Wolf Strikes =

1940 film directed by Sidney Salkow

- Theatrical poster for the film
- Directed by: Sidney Salkow
- Screenplay by: Harry Segall; Albert Duffy
- Story by: Dalton Trumbo
- Based on: characters created by Louis Joseph Vance
- Produced by: Fred Kohlmar
- Starring: Warren William; Joan Perry; Eric Blore
- Cinematography: Henry Freulich
- Edited by: Al Clark
- Music by: M. W. Stoloff
- Production company: Columbia Pictures
- Release date: January 26, 1940 (US)
- Running time: 66 minutes
- Country: United States
- Language: English

The Lone Wolf Strikes is a 1940 American crime drama film directed by Sidney Salkow starring Warren William, Joan Perry, and Eric Blore.

The Lone Wolf character dates back to 1914, when author Louis Joseph Vance invented him for a series of books, later adapted to twenty-four Lone Wolf films (1917–1949). Warren William starred in nine of these films (1939–1943). His next film was The Lone Wolf Meets a Lady, later the same year.

== Plot ==
Wealthy banker Phillip Jordan is taken in by Binnie Weldon, a younger woman. He graciously offers her the use of a very valuable pearl necklace for her birthday celebration. She has no trouble switching it for a good imitation and giving the real one to her boyfriend, Jim Ryder. However, Jordan breaks the necklace, and the jeweler he takes them to detects the forgery. Jordan telephones Weldon that he will be coming to collect the real necklace. However, Ryder arranges a fatal car crash instead.

Stanley Young, Jordan's partner, asks his friend Michael Lanyard, the notorious "Lone Wolf", for help. Lanyard has given up his shady activities but owes Young a big favor, so he accepts the challenge, much to the delight of his bored valet, Jamison. Meanwhile, Delia, Phillip Jordan's daughter, has met Ralph Bolton on a sea voyage and likes him very much, not suspecting that the man is a crook. He reports to his boss Alberts that Lanyard is now involved. Despite Lanyard's reputation, Alberts is unworried; in fact, he plans to let Lanyard retrieve the necklace and then take it from him.

Lanyard manages to learn that the fence Ryder plans to sell the pearls to is his old friend Emil Gorlick. Delia follows Lanyard to Gorlick's hotel. Lanyard confirms Gorlick is to see Weldon and Ryder that night (and that they have never met), then ties up Gorlick and takes his place. Delia, unconvinced by Lanyard's explanation, peeps through the keyhole of Gorlick's room. However, she is spotted by the hotel detective, who unties Gorlick. Delia flees in a taxi, but Gorlick joins her and produces a pistol. However, Lanyard is able to take the necklace before Gorlick arrives. He gives it to Young, who gifts him the fake as a memento.

Young makes the mistake of informing Bolton of the recovery of the pearls. Meanwhile, Ryder telephones Lanyard and demands the necklace for Delia. Lanyard gives the thieves the fake. Lanyard explains the situation to Delia, and they go to Young's place, but find him dead and the pearls gone.

Lanyard takes the fake necklace from Ryder at gunpoint and locks him and Weldon in a closet. He then has the story spread that the second set of crooks got the fake, and that the real pearls were returned to Delia. Alberts' gang goes to the Jordan mansion. Lanyard appears, convinces them he has the pearls, and leads them on a car chase to a ferry. Jamison (at Lanyard's instruction) drives aboard too, with the police trailing him, looking for the man they think murdered Young. When the ferry sails, the crooks have nowhere to run.

== Cast ==
- Warren William as Michael Lanyard, the Lone Wolf
- Joan Perry as Delia Jordan
- Eric Blore as Jamison
- Alan Baxter as Jim Ryder
- Astrid Allwyn as Binnie Weldon
- Montagu Love as Emil Gorlick
- Robert Wilcox as Ralph Bolton
- Don Beddoe as Conroy [Chief of Police]
- Fred A. Kelsey as Dickens [a policeman]
- Addison Richards as Stanley Young
- Roy Gordon as Phillip Jordan
- Harland Tucker as Alberts
- George Lynn as Dorgan (credited as Peter Lynn) [Alberts' other henchman]

== Critical reception ==
The Monthly Film Bulletin wrote: "This is a good, made-to-measure, suspenseful film, although the plot is at times a trifle confused. Warren William is an attractive hero, Eric Blore an amusing and resourceful butler, while Joan Perry makes a charming heroine."
