= Cheaters at Play =

1932 film

- Theatrical release poster
- Directed by: Hamilton MacFadden
- Screenplay by: Malcolm Stuart Boylan
- Based on: the short story, "The Lone Wolf's Son" by Louis Joseph Vance
- Starring: Thomas Meighan; Charlotte Greenwood; William Bakewell; Ralph Morgan; Barbara Weeks; Linda Watkins
- Cinematography: Ernest Palmer
- Edited by: Irene Morra
- Production company: Fox Film Corporation
- Distributed by: Fox Film Corporation
- Release date: January 27, 1932
- Running time: 58 minutes
- Country: United States
- Language: English

Cheaters at Play is a 1932 American pre-Code drama film directed by Hamilton MacFadden and written by Malcolm Stuart Boylan. The film stars Thomas Meighan, Charlotte Greenwood, William Bakewell, Ralph Morgan, Barbara Weeks and Linda Watkins. The film was released on January 27, 1932, by Fox Film Corporation. The film was based on the Lone Wolf character, who appeared in many films produced by Columbia Pictures.

== Cast ==
- Thomas Meighan as Michael Lanyard
- Charlotte Greenwood as Mrs. Crozier
- William Bakewell as Maurice Perry
- Ralph Morgan as Freddie Isquith
- Barbara Weeks as Fenno Crozier
- Linda Watkins as Tess Boyce
- Olin Howland as Secretary
- James Kirkwood, Sr. as Detective Crane
- E. E. Clive as Steward
