= The Lone Wolf (TV series) =

American syndicated TV series (1954)

- Starring: Louis Hayward
- Country of origin: United States
- No. of episodes: 39

Original release
- Release: 1954

The Lone Wolf is an American syndicated television series that aired in 1954. Louis Hayward starred as Michael Lanyard, the Lone Wolf. It ran for 39 episodes.

The show's format had the title character helping people who had problems and had come to him. His methods were unorthodox.

The series was based on stories by Louis Joseph Vance, which William Kozlenko adapted into 78 scripts. Hayward signed to make the series in September 1953. The producers were Jack Gross and Phil Krasne, for United Television. They had a $2.8 million arrangement with Hayward for his acting and for rights to 13 of Vance's books. It also made him co-producer of the series.

The budget was $35,000 an episode. The director was Barney Girard.

Actors who appeared on the series included Barbara Billingsley and Henry Slate.

== Critical response ==
Columnist Eve Starr wrote, "Nothing much new here in the way of detective adventure tales, but with the Hayward touch it was better than average and slightly under superb."
