= The Brass Bowl =

1924 film

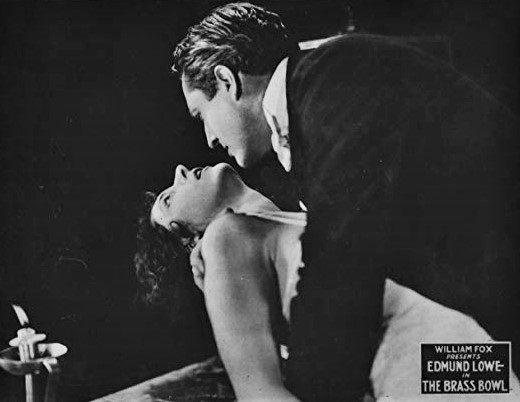
- Still featuring Edmund Lowe and Claire Adams
- Directed by: Jerome Storm
- Screenplay by: Thomas Dixon Jr.
- Based on: The Brass Bowl by Louis Joseph Vance
- Starring: Edmund Lowe; Claire Adams; Jack Duffy; J. Farrell MacDonald; Leo White; Fred J. Butler
- Cinematography: G.O. Post
- Production company: Fox Film Corporation
- Distributed by: Fox Film Corporation
- Release date: November 16, 1924
- Running time: 60 minutes
- Country: United States
- Language: Silent (English intertitles)

The Brass Bowl is a lost 1924 American mystery film directed by Jerome Storm and written by Thomas Dixon Jr. It is based on the 1907 novel The Brass Bowl by Louis Joseph Vance. The film stars Edmund Lowe, Claire Adams, Jack Duffy, J. Farrell MacDonald, Leo White and Fred J. Butler. The film was released on November 16, 1924, by Fox Film Corporation.

== Plot ==
As described in a review in a film magazine, Dan Maitland (Lowe), an adventurous young wealthy chap, sees a mysterious woman leaving his apartment and finds her fingerprints on a blotter which he covers with a brass bowl. Visiting his lawyer who cautions him about the menace of a noted jewel thief, Dan again sees the young woman and follows her in his car. She meets with an accident and, in helping her, she steals his car. Dan walks to his estate and finds the girl robbing his safe. She mistakes him for the thief who is his double. Accepting the situation and trusting the girl he opens the safe and gives her the jewels. The real thief appears, and Dan captures him after a struggle but he gets away. Then follows a series of exciting situations in which Anisty poses as Maitland, confusing everybody and leading to a variety of complications which are finally straightened out when Maitland succeeds in capturing Anisty after a running fight in the elevators of an office building and declares his love for the girl who confesses she turned thief only to get papers from Maitland that would have in- criminated her father.

== Cast ==
- Edmund Lowe as Dan Maitland / Anisty
- Claire Adams as Sylvia
- Jack Duffy as O'Hagan
- J. Farrell MacDonald as Hickey
- Leo White as Taxi driver
- Fred J. Butler as Bannerman

== See also ==
- Masquerade (1929)
