= Arthur Tavares =

American actor and film editor

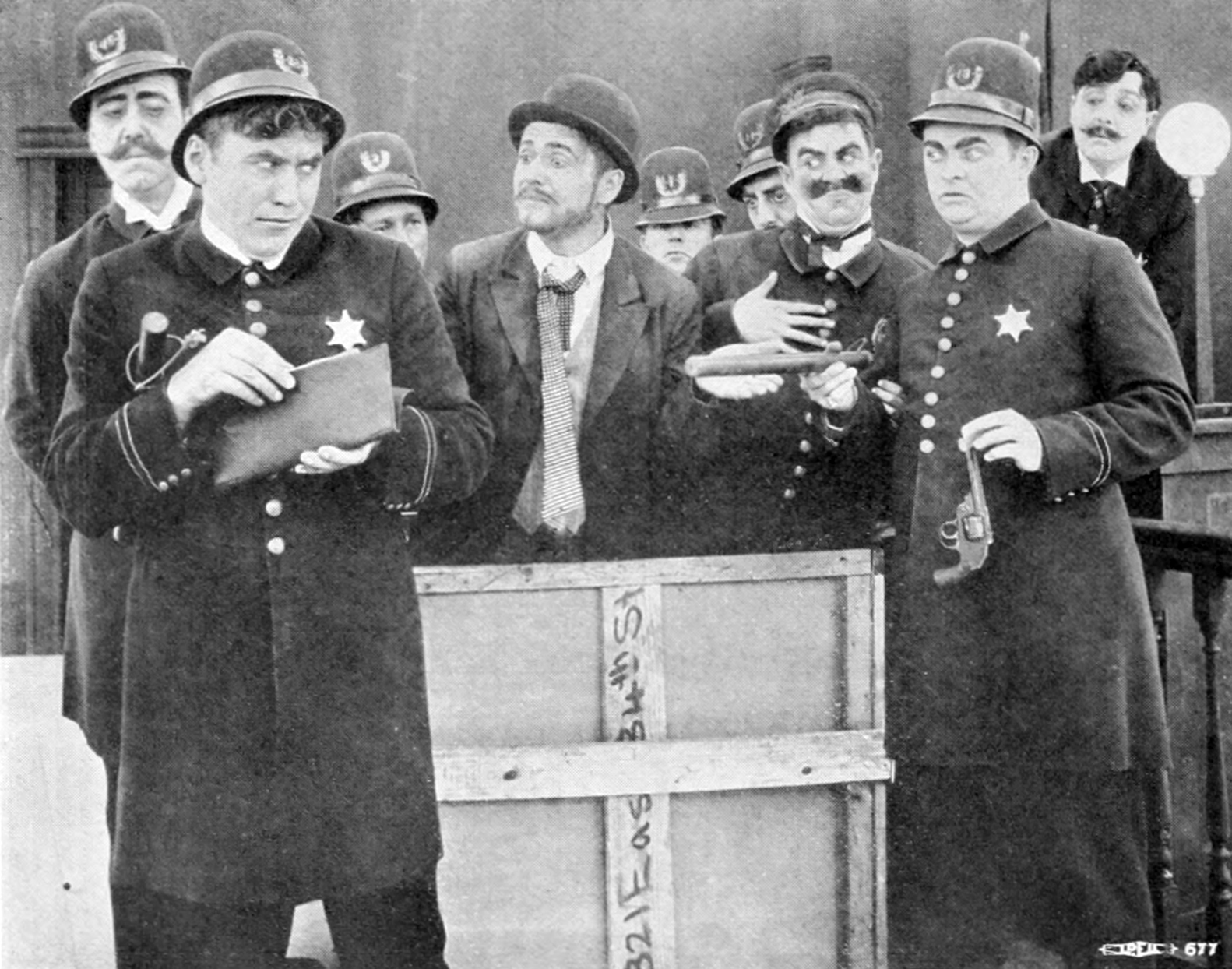
- Photograph of the Keystone Cops from 1912, Tavares on far right
- Born: Arturo Tavares; January 10, 1884; San Francisco, California; United States
- Died: May 27, 1954 (aged 70); Los Angeles, California; United States
- Occupations: Film actor Film editor
- Years active: 1912–1936

Arthur Tavares was an American actor and film editor who was active in Hollywood from the 1910s through the 1930s.

== Biography ==
Arthur was born in San Francisco to Jayme Tavares and Maria Botelho, both of whom were Portuguese immigrants. During the 1910s, Tavares appeared as an actor in silent films in Hollywood. During the 1920s, he changed gears and became an editor. At the beginning of the sound era, Tavares worked on Spanish-language versions of American films. He also made a number of films in Britain, including The Wrecker, The First Born and Song of Freedom.

== Partial filmography ==
=== Actor ===
- The Spanish Jade (1915)
- The Chef's Revenge (1915)
- Ramona (1916)
- The Eyes of the World (1917 film)
- The Savage (1917)
- Hungry Eyes (1918)
- Fortune's Mask (1922)

=== Editor ===
- Lilies of the Field (1924)
- Chickie (1925)
- The Unguarded Hour (1925)
- Puppets (1926)
- The First Born (1928)
- The Wrecker (1929)
- Shadows of Glory (1930)
- Thus is Life (1930)
- Drácula (1931)
- East of Borneo (1931)
- Strictly Dishonorable (1931)
- Sally Bishop (1932)
- Ten Minute Alibi (1935)
- Charing Cross Road (1935)
- Song of Freedom (1936)

== Bibliography ==
- Low, Rachael. History of the British Film, 1918-1929. George Allen & Unwin, 1971.
- Nollen, Scott Allen. Paul Robeson: Film Pioneer. McFarland, 2010.
