= Masquerade (1929 film) =

1929 film

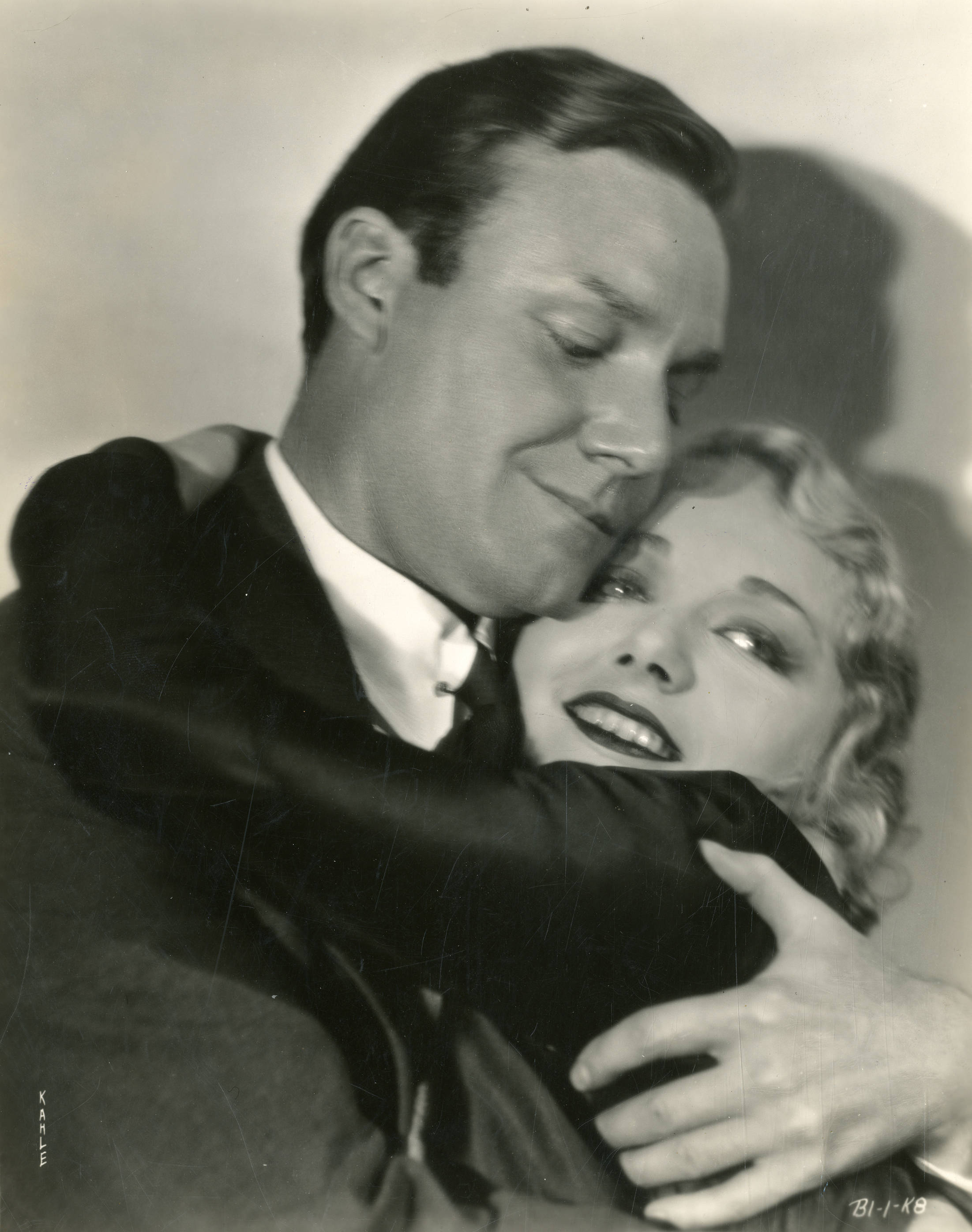
- Alan Birmingham and Leila Hyams
- Directed by: Russell Birdwell
- Screenplay by: Malcolm Stuart Boylan; Frederick Hazlitt Brennan
- Based on: The Brass Bowl; 1907 novel by Louis Joseph Vance
- Starring: Alan Birmingham; Leila Hyams; Arnold Lucy; Clyde Cook; J. Farrell MacDonald; George C. Pearce
- Cinematography: Don Anderson; Charles G. Clarke
- Edited by: Ralph Dietrich
- Production company: Fox Film Corporation
- Distributed by: Fox Film Corporation
- Release date: July 14, 1929
- Running time: 65 minutes
- Country: United States
- Language: English

Masquerade is a 1929 American sound (All-Talking) drama film directed by Russell Birdwell and written by Malcolm Stuart Boylan and Frederick Hazlitt Brennan. It is based on the 1907 novel The Brass Bowl by Louis Joseph Vance. The film stars Alan Birmingham, Leila Hyams, Arnold Lucy, Clyde Cook, J. Farrell MacDonald, and George C. Pearce. The film was released on July 14, 1929, by Fox Film Corporation.

== Cast ==
- Alan Birmingham as Dan Anisty / Dan Maitland
- Leila Hyams as Sylvia Graeme
- Arnold Lucy as Bannerman
- Clyde Cook as Blodgett
- J. Farrell MacDonald as Joe Hickey
- George C. Pearce as Andrew Graeme
- Rita La Roy as Girl
- Frank Richardson as Singer
- John Breeden as First Reporter
- Jack P. Pierce as Second Reporter
- Pat Moriarity as Third Reporter
- Jack Carlyle as Fourth Reporter

== See also ==
- The Brass Bowl (1924)
- List of early sound feature films (1926–1929)
