= Lone Wolf (character) =

Fictional character in novels by Louis Joseph Vance

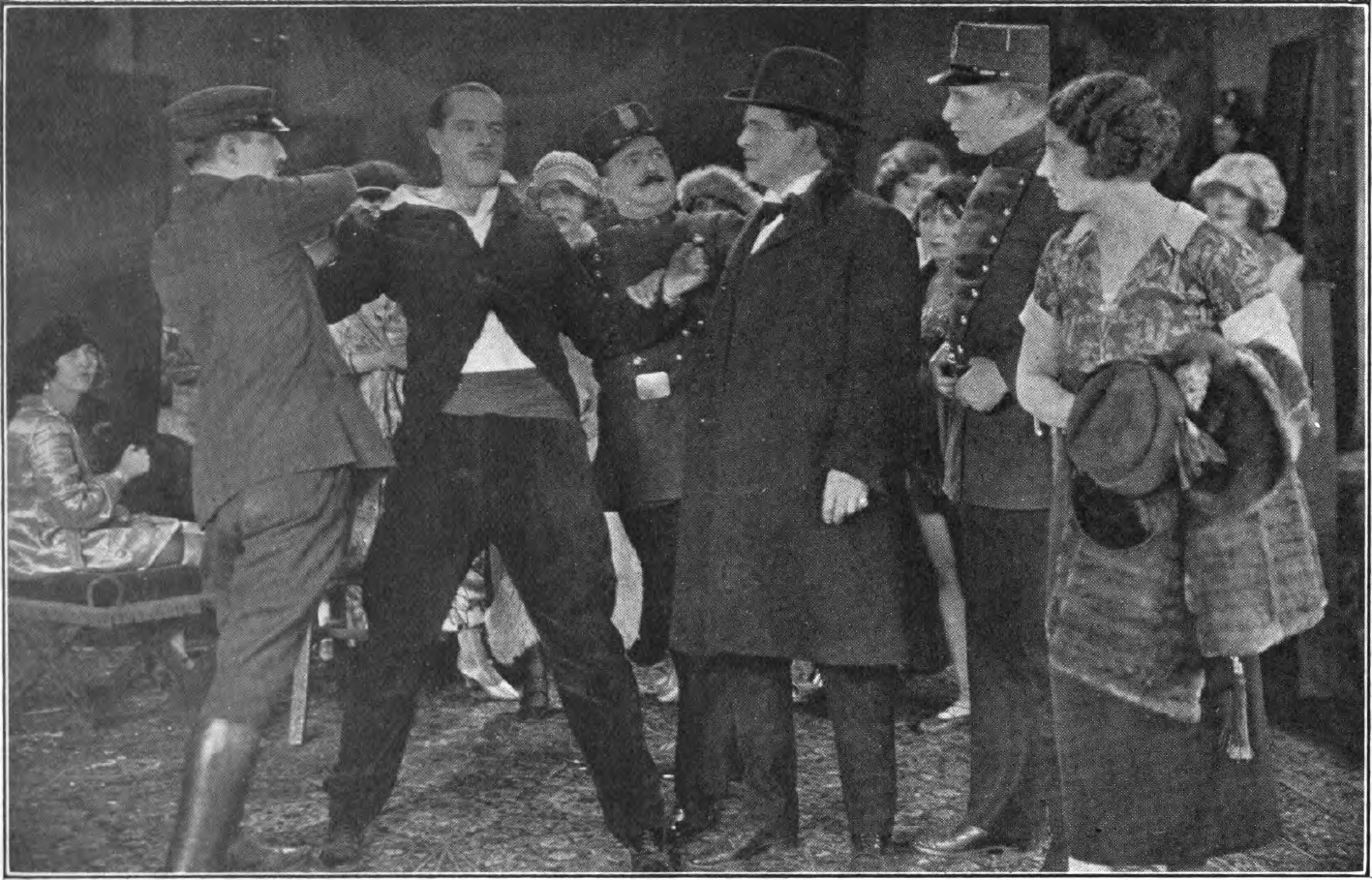
"The Lone Wolf recoils when faced by sergeants de ville in the studio of an artist friend." Frontispiece of The Lone Wolf, book introducing the character, 1914

The Lone Wolf is the nickname of the fictional character Michael Lanyard, a jewel thief turned private detective in a series of novels written by Louis Joseph Vance (1879–1933). Many films based on and inspired by the books have been made. The character also appeared briefly on radio and television.

== Books ==
=== By Louis Joseph Vance ===
1. The Lone Wolf (1914)
2. The False Faces (1918)
3. Alias The Lone Wolf (1921)
4. Red Masquerade: Being the Story of The Lone Wolf's Daughter (1921)
5. The Lone Wolf Returns (1923)
6. The Lone Wolf's Son (1931)
7. Encore The Lone Wolf (1933)
8. The Lone Wolf's Last Prowl (1934)

=== By Carl W. Smith ===
- The Lone Wolf and the Hidden Empire (1947)

== Films ==
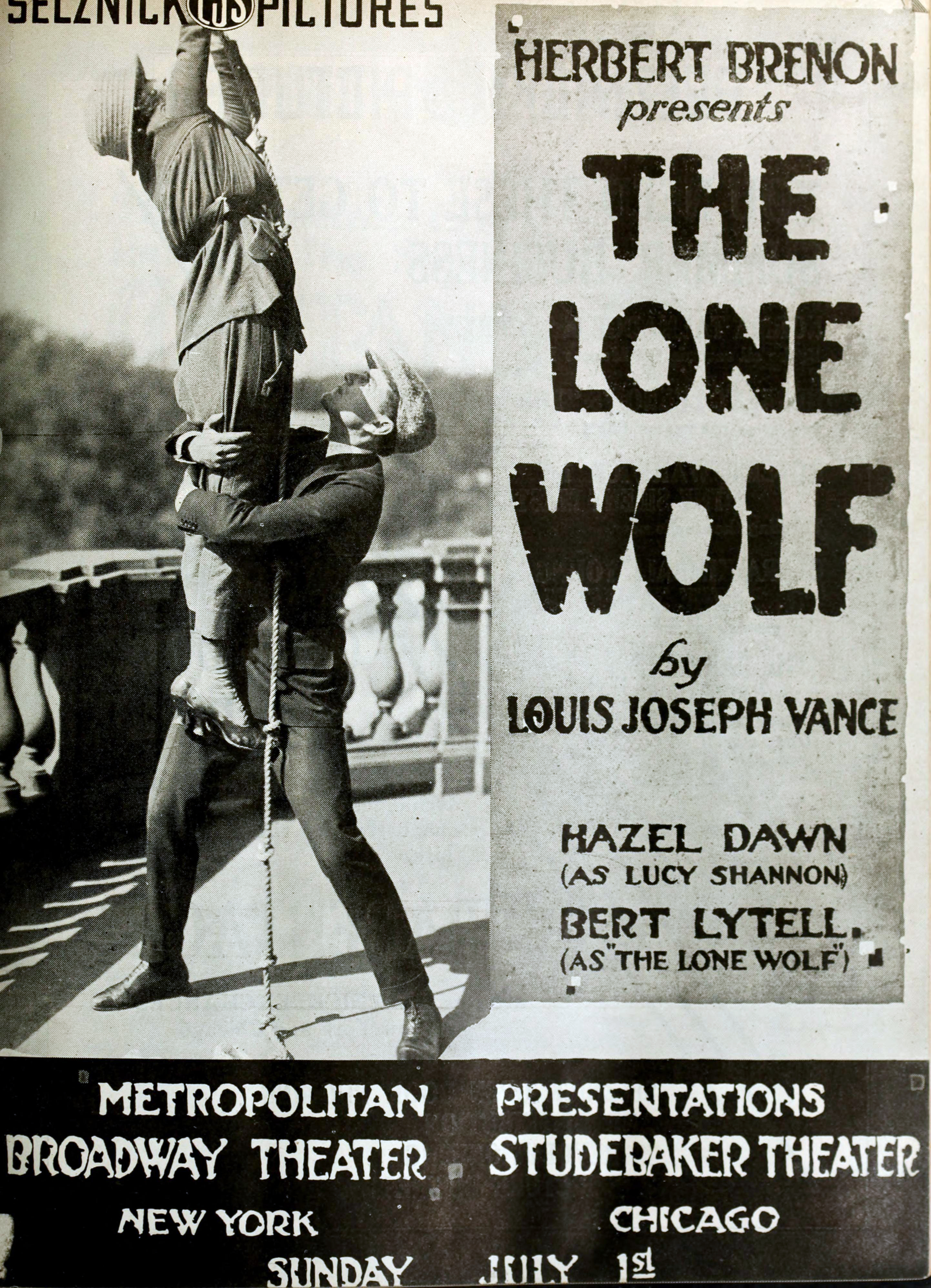
The Lone Wolf, advertisement in Moving Picture World

- The Lone Wolf (silent, 1917, Bert Lytell)
- The False Faces (silent, 1919, Henry B. Walthall)
- The Lone Wolf's Daughter (silent, 1919, Bertram Grassby)
- The Lone Wolf (silent, 1924, Jack Holt)
- The Lone Wolf Returns (silent, 1926, Bert Lytell)
- Alias the Lone Wolf (silent, 1927, Bert Lytell)
- The Lone Wolf's Daughter (1929, Bert Lytell)
- The Last of the Lone Wolf (1930, Bert Lytell)
- Cheaters at Play (1932, Thomas Meighan)
- The Lone Wolf Returns (1935, Melvyn Douglas)
- The Lone Wolf in Paris (1938, Francis Lederer)
- The Lone Wolf Spy Hunt (1939, Warren William)
- The Lone Wolf Strikes (1940, Warren William)
- The Lone Wolf Meets a Lady (1940, Warren William)
- The Lone Wolf Keeps a Date (1941, Warren William)
- The Lone Wolf Takes a Chance (1941, Warren William)
- Secrets of the Lone Wolf (1941, Warren William)
- Counter-Espionage (1942, Warren William)
- One Dangerous Night (1943, Warren William)
- Passport to Suez (1943, Warren William)
- The Notorious Lone Wolf (1946, Gerald Mohr)
- The Lone Wolf in Mexico (1947, Gerald Mohr)
- The Lone Wolf in London (1947, Gerald Mohr)
- The Lone Wolf and His Lady (1949, Ron Randell)

Eric Blore played Jamison (sometimes spelled "Jameson"), the Lone Wolf's butler and assistant, in eleven of the films, starting with The Lone Wolf Strikes and ending with The Lone Wolf in London.

== Radio ==
- Suspense episode Murder Goes for a Swim (1943, Warren William)
- The Lone Wolf (1948, Walter Coy/Gerald Mohr, with Jay Novello as Jamison)

== TV ==
- The Lone Wolf (aka Streets of Danger, 1954–1955, Louis Hayward)
