= The Lone Wolf in Paris =

1938 film by Albert S. Rogell

- Directed by: Albert S. Rogell
- Screenplay by: Arthur T. Horman
- Cinematography: Lucien Ballard
- Edited by: Otto Meyer
- Production company: Columbia Pictures
- Distributed by: Columbia Pictures
- Release date: May 25, 1938
- Running time: 66 minutes
- Country: United States
- Language: English

The Lone Wolf in Paris is a 1938 American mystery film, one of Columbia's Lone Wolf film series.

In the start-and-stop history of the Lone Wolf series, this entry is the only one with Lederer as star. It stands alone between Melvyn Douglas's The Lone Wolf Returns in 1935, and the first of Warren William's series of nine, The Lone Wolf Spy Hunt, released the following year.

== Cast ==
- Francis Lederer as Michael Lanyard/The Lone Wolf
- Frances Drake as Princess Thania of Arvonne
- Olaf Hytten as Jenkins
- Walter Kingsford as Grand Duke Gregor de Meyerson
- Leona Maricle as Baroness Cambrell
- Albert Dekker as Marquis Louis de Meyerson
- Maurice Cass as Alfonse Fromont, hotel manager
- Bess Flowers as Davna
- Ruth Robinson as The Queen of Arvonne
- Pio Peretti as Prince Paul of Arvonne
- Eddie Fetherston as Mace, henchman
