= The Lone Wolf's Daughter (1929 film) =

1929 film directed by Albert S. Rogell

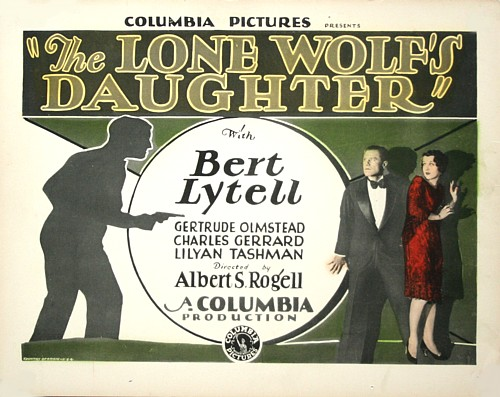
- Directed by: Albert S. Rogell
- Written by: Sig Herzig
- Based on: Characters created by Louis Joseph Vance
- Produced by: Harry Cohn; Jack Cohn
- Starring: Bert Lytell
- Cinematography: James Van Trees
- Edited by: William Hamilton
- Distributed by: Columbia Pictures
- Release date: February 18, 1929
- Running time: 72 minutes; 7 reels
- Country: United States
- Languages: Sound (Part-Talkie); English Intertitles

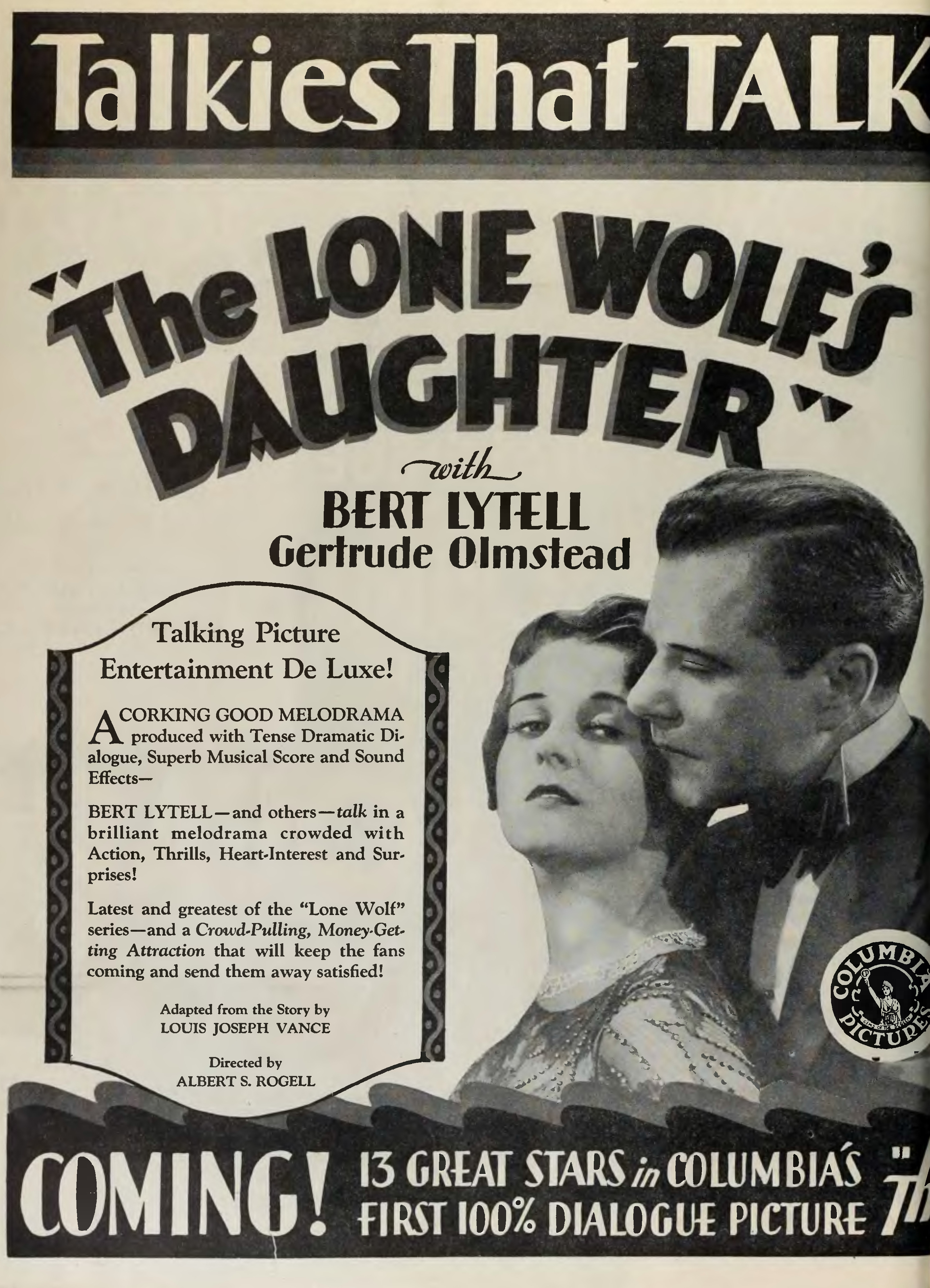
Ad from The Film Daily, 1929

The Lone Wolf's Daughter is a lost 1929 feature part-talkie sound film. While the film had a few sequences with audible dialog, the majority of the film featured a synchronized musical score with sound effects using both the sound-on-disc and sound-on-film process. It was directed by Albert S. Rogell and stars Bert Lytell. It was produced and distributed by Columbia Pictures. It was the third film produced by Columbia Pictures in their Lone Wolf series.

The story was previously filmed as the silent film The Lone Wolf's Daughter in 1919.

== Plot ==
Michael Lanyard, the famed reformed jewel thief known as The Lone Wolf, arrives in New York, where police, led by Inspector Ethier, are on high alert after cables from France warn of his approach. At the Duval Antique Auction Galleries, Lanyard casually outbids spirited society woman Helen Fairchild for a rare Chinese vase. The affront to her pride is compounded when Count Polinac tries to sell her a supposedly valuable Van Wirth painting, only for Lanyard to publicly reveal it as a fake—pointing out that tobacco was unknown in the painter's country at the time. Both Helen and the Count are infuriated.

The scene shifts when a pendant once owned by Catherine the Great goes missing. Lanyard discreetly lifts it from the handbag of the elegant but duplicitous Countess Polinac and plants it where the police will find it, exonerating himself and forcing a grudging apology from Ethier.

Now a self-proclaimed art collector for Herve of Paris, Lanyard's real reason for being in America is to see Adrienne, the adopted daughter of a late friend. Adrienne is in love with Bobby Crenshaw, heir to a wealthy family, and Lanyard, approving of the match, excuses himself.

He soon makes a bold, unconventional call on Helen, entering through her window to deliver the Chinese vase, stealing a kiss as “payment” before vanishing again.

Later, Lanyard attends the Crenshaw estate's engagement party for Adrienne and Bobby. Among the guests are the Polinacs and Helen. While Polinac searches Lanyard's luggage, Lanyard reciprocates, finding a set of imitation pearls intended to replace Mrs. Crenshaw's genuine strand. Polinac sets a trap using the cover of a “Lone Wolf” warning to persuade the guests to lock their jewels in a safe. He then pressures Lanyard to open it, threatening to ruin Adrienne's marriage prospects by revealing his identity. Lanyard agrees only to open the safe, refusing to touch the loot.

That night, Countess Polinac tries to seduce Lanyard into a partnership, only to be turned away—an exit witnessed by Helen, who becomes jealous. She later catches Lanyard apparently opening the safe, unaware that he is removing the jewels for safekeeping in a hidden location.

The Count's attempt to steal the contents is foiled when the safe is empty. In the morning, imitation pearls are “found” in Lanyard's room, leading to his arrest. While the Polinacs attempt to flee, they are brought back after a clever ruse in which Lanyard poses as the chauffeur.

As accusations fly, Scotland Yard telephotos reveal the Count and Countess as wanted international jewel thieves. Lanyard produces the real jewels from a file book where he had hidden them under each owner's initial. Ethier clears him, and Helen—realizing her mistake—apologizes, sealing her newfound affection for the gallant rogue.

== Cast ==
- Bert Lytell as Michael Lanyard / The Lone Wolf
- Gertrude Olmstead as Helen Fairchild
- Charles K. Gerrard as Count Polinac
- Lilyan Tashman as Velma
- Donald Keith as Bobby Crenshaw
- Florence Allen as Adrienne
- Robert Elliott as Ethier
- Ruth Cherrington as Mrs. Crenshaw

== Music ==
The film featured a theme song entitled "You Stole My Heart Away", which was composed by Peter DeRose and Ballard MacDonald.

== See also ==
- List of early sound feature films (1926–1929)
