= The Lone Wolf Meets a Lady =

1940 film by Sidney Salkow

- Directed by: Sidney Salkow
- Written by: Louis Joseph Vance (story); Wolfe Kaufman (story)
- Screenplay by: John Larkin
- Based on: characters created by Louis Joseph Vance
- Produced by: Irving Briskin; Ralph Cohn
- Starring: Warren William; Eric Blore; Jean Muir
- Cinematography: Henry Freulich
- Edited by: Al Clark
- Music by: Sidney Cutner
- Distributed by: Columbia Pictures Corporation
- Release date: May 30, 1940
- Running time: 71 minutes
- Country: United States
- Language: English

The Lone Wolf Meets a Lady is a 1940 American drama directed by Sidney Salkow, starring Warren William, Eric Blore and Jean Muir.

The Lone Wolf character dates back to 1914, when author Louis Joseph Vance created him for a series of books, later adapted to twenty-four Lone Wolf films (1917–1949). Warren Williams starred in nine of these films (1939–1943), with The Lone Wolf Meets a Lady being William's third as Michael Lanyard. His next film was The Lone Wolf Keeps a Date, in 1941.

The film also introduces a sidekick for Lanyard, his bumbling valet Jamison, played by Eric Blore. Blore would play Jamison in seven more films.

== Plot ==
At the Penyon mansion, Bob Penyon gives his fiancée Joan Bradley a very valuable diamond necklace, a family heirloom. Rose Waverly telephones Clay Beaudine to let him know that the couple have just left with the necklace. Peter Rennick, the husband Joan thought was dead, would rather blackmail his wife, but Beaudine wants the necklace. Rennick confronts Joan and forcibly takes the necklace, but is shot and killed by an unseen murderer, who takes the jewelry. Panicking, Joan flees her apartment. Waiting outside, Beaudine is puzzled.

A speeding Jamison nearly runs Joan down. A motorcycle policeman arrests her, Jamison and his employer, Michael Lanyard, the happily retired gentleman criminal the "Lone Wolf". However, Joan blurts out that she is involved in a murder, so Lanyard gives the policeman the slip. He takes Joan back to her apartment, examines it and the body for clues, and provides her with a cover story. As Lanyard and Jamison are leaving, they are spotted and overheard by Beaudine.

When the police arrive, Inspector Crane believes Joan, until he learns that the door was not forced and a key found on the dead man fits the lock. He decides to take her in for further questioning, but lets her get properly dressed first. She escapes, as Crane had hoped, as he has arranged to have her followed. She finds Lanyard's address in the telephone directory and heads there.

Beaudine gets there first, convinced that Lanyard and Joan are working together to steal the necklace. Then Joan arrives. After Jamison takes Beaudine into the next room at gunpoint, Lanyard learns about the incriminating key and that Joan got away so easily. When Crane shows up, as Lanyard had expected, Lanyard hides Joan in a secret compartment. After the police and Beaudine leave, Lanyard and Joan go to see Nick, a fence Lanyard knows, to ask him to find out if anybody is trying to sell the necklace.

Beaudine comes to Lanyard's place while he is out, but Joan is present. He then recognizes the person who fled the apartment where Rennick was killed from a newspaper photo of the people who were present when Joan received the necklace. After locking Joan and Jamison up, he telephones the person and demands the necklace be brought to his place in 15 minutes. Jamison has, however, turned on a recording device. Bob Penyon and Lanyard arrive just after Beaudine leaves. Lanyard receives a call from Nick, who informs him the necklace had been broken up and sold piecemeal a year before. The recording proves helpful, and Lanyard and Penyon race away. They get Rennick's address from his dry cleaner, who then calls Crane. They find Beaudine dead. From a clue, Lanyard thinks he has solved the case, but Inspector Crane and his men arrive and arrest him. Fortunately for Lanyard, Bob produces a gun. Lanyard telephones Joan and has her inform the suspects that he has figured out who the murderer is and the location of the necklace, in the river beside Joan's apartment. While Bob holds the others prisoner, Lanyard takes Crane to Joan's place. First Peter van Wyke, then Arthur Trent, and finally Bob's mother drive up. Lanyard eventually identifies van Wyke as the killer.

== Cast ==
- Warren William as Michael Lanyard
- Jean Muir as Joan Bradley
- Eric Blore as Jamison
- Victor Jory as Clay Beaudine
- Roger Pryor as Peter Rennick
- Warren Hull as Bob Penyon
- Thurston Hall as Inspector Crane
- Fred Kelsey as Detective Dickens (as Fred A. Kelsey)
- Robert Emmett Keane as Peter Van Wyck
- Georgia Caine as Mrs. Penyon
- William Forrest as Arthur Trent
- Marla Shelton as Rose Waverly
- Bruce Bennett as McManus [the motorcycle policeman]
- Luis Alberni as Nicolo Pappakontous [the dry cleaner] (uncredited)
- Don Beddoe as police doctor (uncredited)
- Richard Fiske as Detective Jackson (uncredited)
- Roger Gray as air pump operator (uncredited)
- Shemp Howard as Joe [the pickpocket who admires Lanyard] (uncredited)

== Notes ==
In February 1940 the MPAA/PCA informed Columbia that a number of changes in the script were necessary before the film could receive certification. Among the many demands by PCA were that the "radio announcer must not be characterized, in any way, as a pansy"; that the drinking in the film be "held to an absolute minimum"; that the hiccuping be eliminated; that the "business of Pete slapping and cuffing Joan" be eliminated; that the film not reveal the details of the crime; and that there be "no showing of panties or other particularly intimate garments."
