= The Spanish Jade (1922 film) =

1922 film

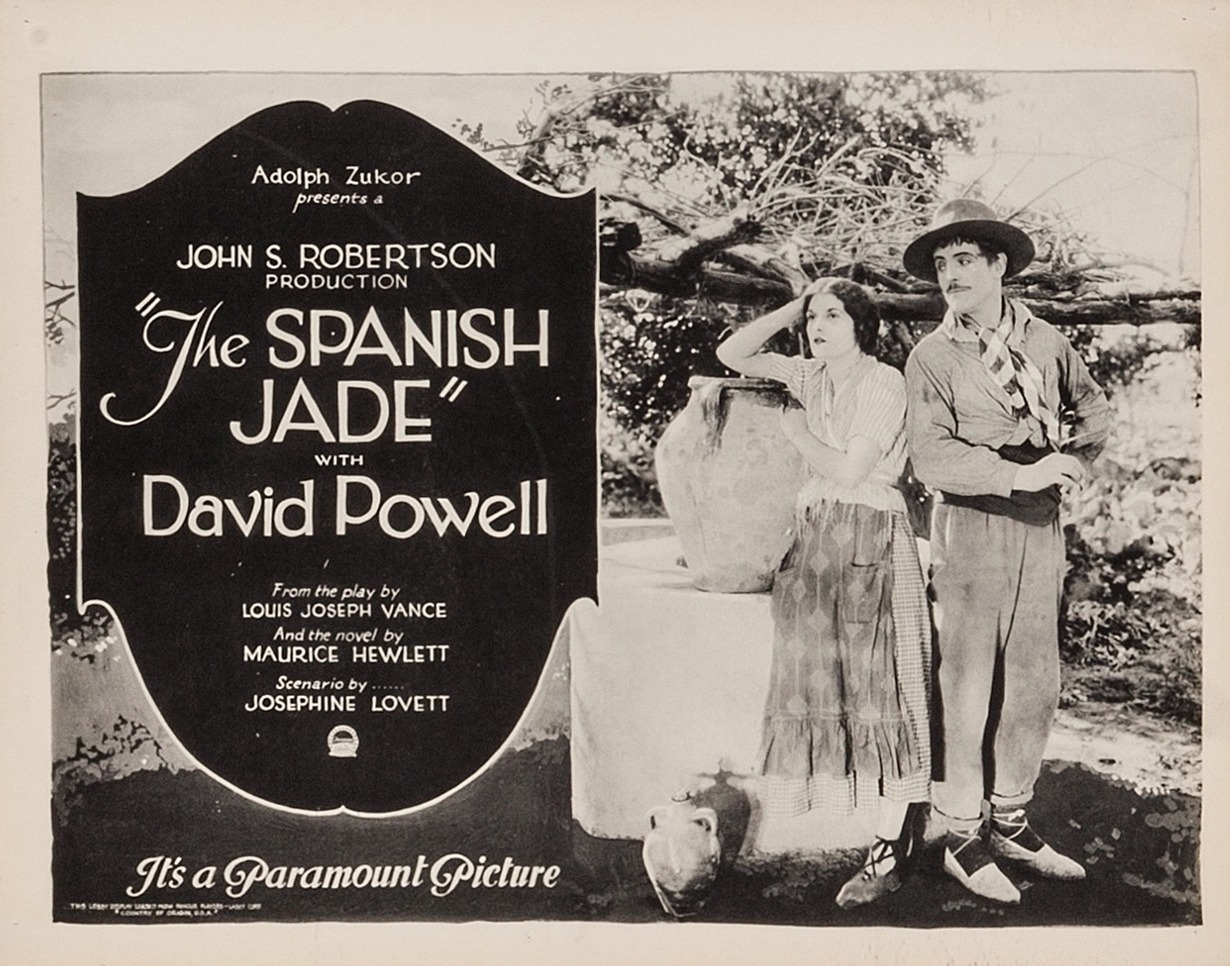
- Lobby card
- Directed by: John S. Robertson
- Written by: Josephine Lovett (scenario)
- Based on: the play, The Spanish Jade by: Louis Joseph Vance; Maurice Henry Hewlett
- Produced by: Adolph Zukor
- Starring: David Powell
- Cinematography: Roy F. Overbaugh
- Production company: Famous Players–Lasky British Producers
- Distributed by: Paramount Pictures
- Release date: 10 April 1922
- Running time: 67 minutes
- Country: United Kingdom
- Language: Silent (English intertitles)

The Spanish Jade is a 1922 British silent drama film directed by John S. Robertson. Alfred Hitchcock is credited as a title designer. The film is considered to be lost. It was shot at Islington Studios in London by the British subsidiary of Paramount Pictures. The story had previously been made into a 1915 film of the same title.

== Cast ==
- David Powell as Gil Pérez
- Marc McDermott as Don Luis Ramónez de Alavia
- Charles de Rochefort as Esteban
- Evelyn Brent as Mañuela
- Lionel d'Aragon as Mañuela's Stepfather
- Frank Stanmore as Tormillo, Don Luis' servant
- Roy Byford as Esteban's Spy and Confident
- Harry Ham as Oswald Manvers

== See also ==
- Alfred Hitchcock filmography
- The Spanish Jade (1915)
- List of lost films

== Bibliography ==
- Low, Rachael. The History of the British Film 1918-1929. George Allen & Unwin, 1971.
