= The False Faces =

1919 film

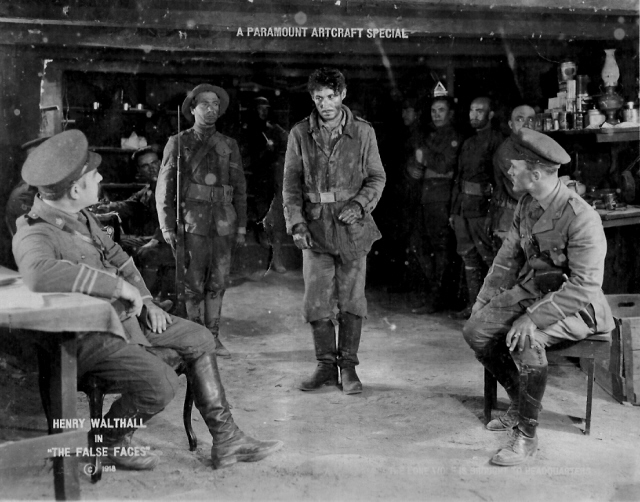
- Film still with Henry B. Walthall (center)
- Directed by: Irvin Willat
- Written by: Irvin Willat (scenario)
- Based on: the novel, The False Faces by Louis Joseph Vance
- Produced by: Thomas H. Ince
- Starring: Henry B. Walthall; Lon Chaney; Mary Anderson
- Cinematography: Paul Eagler; Edwin W. Willat
- Edited by: W. Duncan Mansfield
- Distributed by: Paramount Pictures
- Release date: February 16, 1919
- Running time: 7 reels (97 minutes)
- Country: United States
- Languages: Silent; English intertitles

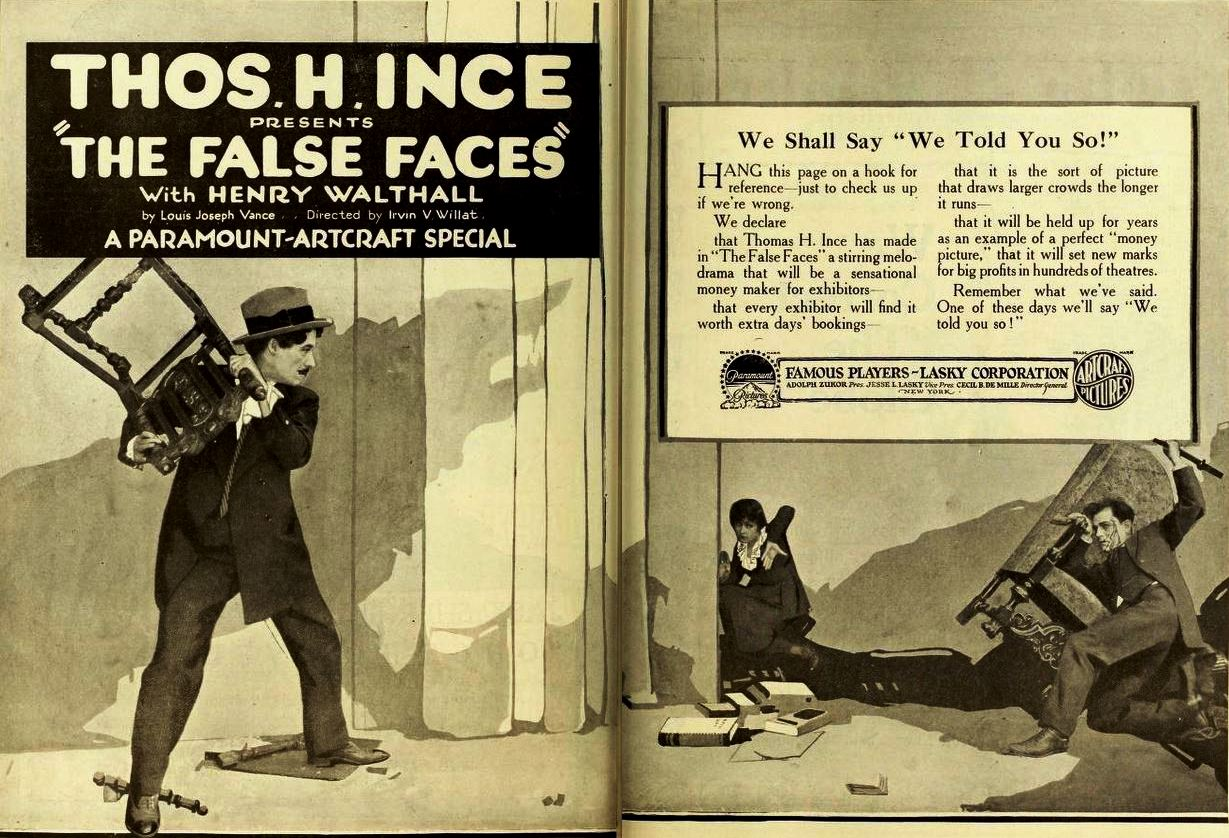
Advertisement with (from left) Walthall, Anderson and Chaney, 1919

The False Faces is a 1919 American silent action film written and directed by Irvin Willat, based on the novel by Louis Joseph Vance, and starring Henry B. Walthall as Michael Lanyard, the "Lone Wolf," and Lon Chaney as Karl Ekstrom, the villain. A complete print of the film survives at the George Eastman House and at the Turner Film Library. It was thought to be lost for years, but was later found and somewhat restored. Director Willat was originally to have shared co-directing chores with Jerome Storm, but when the film's production was moved back from August to October, he ended up being the sole director.

Lon Chaney's energetic performance, especially in the film's furious finale, remains an early example of his celebrated work. Chaney is shown applying a fake beard to his face in one scene, the only time he was ever photographed in a film applying his makeup. Chaney also designed and applied actress Jane Daly's makeup to give her the appearance of a "sea-corpse" as she appears to the haunted U-boat captain in the film. A cover reproduction of the film's sheet music exists.

Based on a series of novels begun in 1914 by Louis Joseph Vance, the Lone Wolf character remained a part of popular culture for generations, with movies ranging from 1917 to 1949 starring Jack Holt, Melvyn Douglas, Warren William, Gerald Mohr (who had also played the part in a radio series) and others in the Michael Lanyard role, as well as a 1954-55 "Lone Wolf" television series with Louis Hayward delineating his fictional exploits.

Henry B. Walthall had starred in D. W. Griffith's seminal The Birth of a Nation four years earlier, while Lon Chaney went on to become one of the world's most enduring cultural icons with performances in films such as the Hunchback of Notre Dame four years later and the Phantom of the Opera in 1925.

== Plot ==
The False Faces (1919)

During World War I, Michael Lanyard, a professional thief known as "The Lone Wolf", is assigned to cross No-Man's-Land to steal a cylinder with important information from behind the German lines and bring it to Allied Intelligence headquarters on the British side. Once there, the British Captain Osbourne sends him on a mission to the United States, crossing the Atlantic by ship. However, German agents are out to stop him, headed by the dreaded Karl Eckstrom, the man who was responsible for murdering Lanyard's sister and her family.

On the boat, Lanyard meets Cecilia Brooke who gives him a secret message. Eckstrom is able to signal a German submarine in the area and causes the ship to be torpedoed. Lanyard is thrown overboard and picked up by the crew of the German sub, but he fools them by posing as Eckstrom. He is able to destroy the sub as it nears Martha's Vineyard, and heads for New York City. He discovers the Germans have kidnapped Cecilia and are holding her in a secret headquarters there. Lanyard breaks in and fights Eckstrom to rescue Cecilia, tricking Eckstrom's own men into shooting him in a hail of bullets. He then exposes the German spy ring to the police and completes his secret mission.

== Cast ==
- Henry B. Walthall as Michael Lanyard, the "Lone Wolf"
- Mary Anderson as Cecilia Brooke
- Lon Chaney as Karl Eckstrom
- Milton Ross as Ralph Crane
- Thornton Edwards as Lieutenant Thackery
- William Bowman as Captain Osborne
- Garry McGarry as Submarine Lieutenant
- Ernest Pasque as Blensop

== Reception ==
"Whereas other melodramas make some effort to create the temporary illusion of possibility and consistency, THE FALSE FACES soars through its own high course of fights, feats and thrills, regardless of all laws, human and divine. Thomas H. Ince, who produced the photoplay, and Irvin V. Willatt, who directed it, seem to have set out to make No Man's Land look tame compared to the New York battlefront, and they have done so." ---The New York Times

"There are several reasons why this offering should please picturegoers, especially those who enjoy the kind that are strong and virile. To begin with, it is full of high speed action; again, due to the logical development of the story, it keeps one in continual suspense; further, it contains no gruesome or repulsive situations." ---Motion Picture News

"(The film) is derived from one of the best stories of its kind. It is also one of the best released by Paramount-Artcraft....The False Faces will hold closely the attention of any audience.... With all this masterly handling of incident, there is lacking at moments that dramatic quality which leads up to a crisis. This is compensated for in a measure by the fine impersonation of Walthall, whose native ability and admirable training enable him to make effective use of his opportunities. He is capably supported by Lon Chaney as "Eckstrom" and practically all the men in the cast, but Mary Anderson seldom rises to the gravity of her role." ---Moving Picture World

"It's a sure 'nuff thriller from beginning to end, with a mystery plot that introduces a succession of surprises and a lot of situations that will get any crowd by reason of their novelty and dramatic strength... Lon Chaney is the personification of villainy as Eckstrom." ---Wid's Film Daily
