= The Lone Wolf (1924 film) =

1924 film by Stanner E.V. Taylor

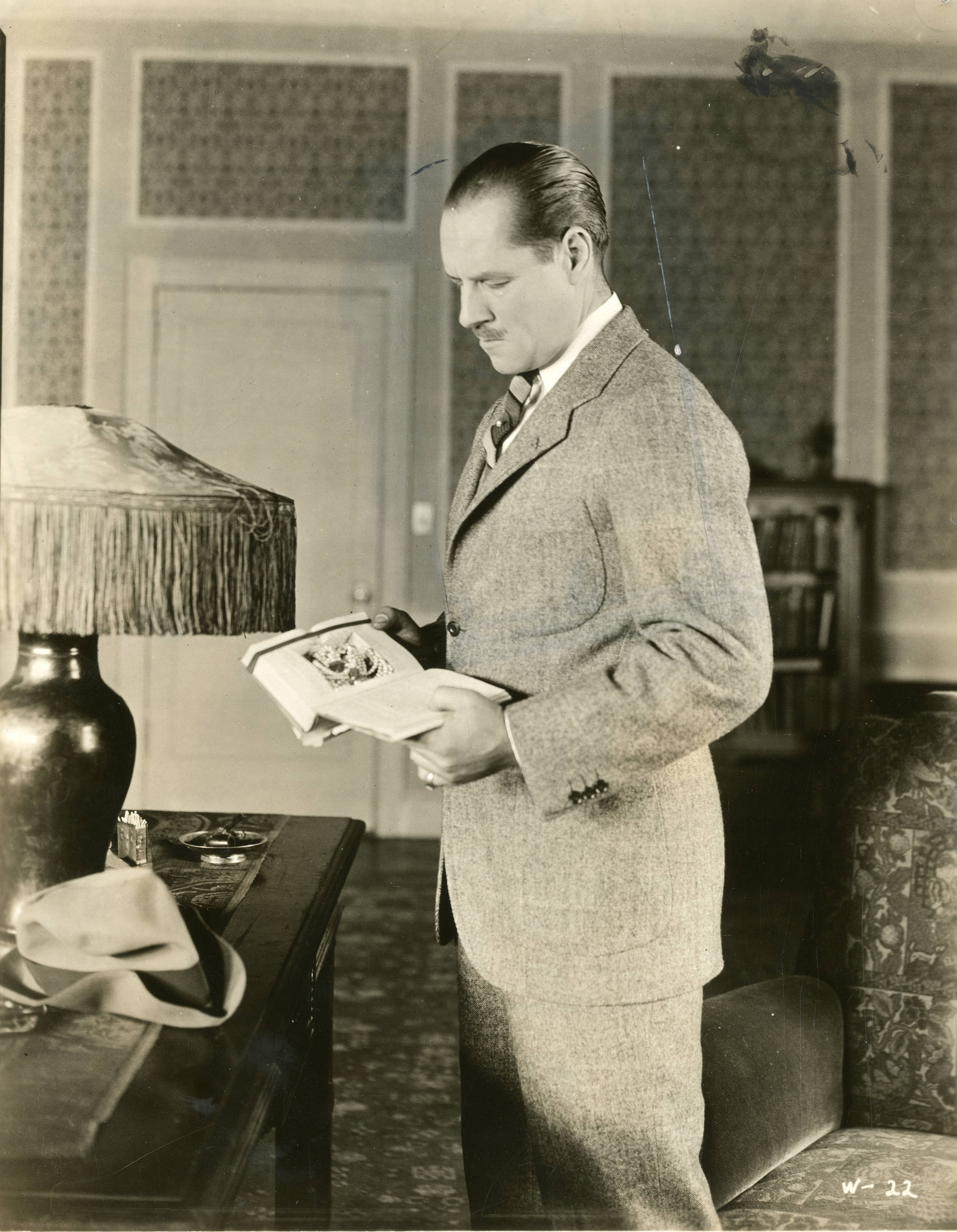
- Jack Holt in the film
- Directed by: Stanner E. V. Taylor
- Written by: Stanner E. V. Taylor
- Based on: short story by Louis Joseph Vance
- Produced by: John McKeon
- Starring: Dorothy Dalton; Jack Holt; Wilton Lackaye
- Cinematography: Jack Brown
- Distributed by: Associated Exhibitors
- Release date: April 27, 1924
- Running time: 60 minutes
- Country: United States
- Language: Silent (English intertitles)

The Lone Wolf is a 1924 American silent mystery film written and directed by Stanner E. V. Taylor based on a story by Louis Joseph Vance. This marked the final film of star Dorothy Dalton.

This is a remake of the 1917 film also titled The Lone Wolf.

== Plot ==
As described in a film magazine review, Michael Lanyard, an international crook, refuses to join a band of Paris criminals in their attempt to steal valuable secret plans from the United States Government. He falls in love with Lucy Shannon, the trusted agent of the outlaws. The papers fall into the hands of Eckstrom, leader of the gang. Lanyard gets the plans back, but Eckstrom recovers them and flees in an airplane. Lucy and Lanyard follow him in another machine. Lanyard swings from a rope, boards his enemy's airplane, and then overpowers Eckstrom in a mid-air fight and secures the documents. Lanyard and Lucy deliver the plans to the authorities. She then reveals herself as a member of the secret service. Lanyard wins her love and a pardon.

== Cast ==
- Dorothy Dalton as Lucy Shannon
- Jack Holt as Michael Lanyard
- Wilton Lackaye as William Burroughs
- Tyrone Power Sr. as Bannon
- Charlotte Walker as Clare Henshaw
- Lucy Fox as Annette Dupre
- Edouard Durand as Popinot
- Robert T. Haines as Solon
- Gustav von Seyffertitz as Wetheimer
- Alphonse Ethier as Eckstrom
- William H. Tooker as Ambassador
- Paul McAllister as Count de Morbihan

== Preservation ==
With no copies of The Lone Wolf located in any film archives, it is a lost film.
