= The Lone Wolf Returns (1935 film) =

1935 film by Roy William Neill

- Directed by: Roy William Neill
- Written by: Lionel Houser; Joseph Krumgold; Bruce Manning
- Based on: the 1923 novel The Lone Wolf Returns by Louis Joseph Vance
- Produced by: Robert North
- Starring: Melvyn Douglas; Gail Patrick; Tala Birell
- Cinematography: Henry Freulich
- Edited by: Viola Lawrence
- Music by: Howard Jackson (uncredited)
- Production company: Columbia Pictures
- Distributed by: Columbia Pictures
- Release date: December 31, 1935
- Running time: 68 minutes
- Country: United States
- Language: English

The Lone Wolf Returns is a 1935 American mystery crime film directed by Roy William Neill and starring Melvyn Douglas, Gail Patrick and Tala Birell. Douglas plays jewel thief Michael Lanyard, aka the Lone Wolf. Retired, the Lone Wolf is forced back into crime, but turns the tables on his enemies. It is based on the 1923 Louis Joseph Vance novel The Lone Wolf Returns, which had previously been made into a 1926 film of the same name.

== Plot ==
New York City Chief of Detectives Mc Gowan gets a tip that the notorious international jewel thief the Lone Wolf is after the Bancroft pearls that very night. He assigns Benson to the case, even though nobody knows who the Lone Wolf is; only former Inspector Crane even had a clue. The Lone Wolf has no trouble taking the necklace, but then he spots policemen surrounding the mansion. He steals and puts on the butler's robe and glasses and gets away.

Next door, at a masquerade party, he sees "Mal" Mallison make a clumsy attempt to steal an emerald pendant from Marcia Stewart, the beautiful hostess. He eavesdrops when she goes upstairs to put the pendant away in a wall safe, and learns that she is discontented and yearning for romance. After taking the pendant, he borrows a mask from a drunk partyer who wanders in. He goes downstairs, dances with Marcia and kisses her. They are interrupted when the police arrive, seeking her aunt Julie; Marcia goes to speak with them. They request that she ask all the guests to unmask so she can identify any strangers. She does not betray Lanyard. Liane, Mallison's wife, recognizes him and invites him to another party the next night, in Marcia's honor, at Morphew's. Afterward, he returns the pendant to the safe.

Frustrated with Benson's lack of progress, Mc Gowan sends for Crane. Crane immediately goes to see Lanyard. Lanyard tells him that the Lone Wolf has retired as of the previous night. Lanyard's valet Jenkins is disappointed that he really means it. Later Lanyard returns the pearls.

At the party, Morphew offers Lanyard 25% of the proceeds of the coming robbery, but when Lanyard declines, Morhew informs Marcia that Lanyard is the Lone Wolf. She goes home. Morphew's henchmen are ready to take Lanyard away, but Jenkins sets up a police raid as prearranged, and Lanyard gets away. When the lights go out, he finds Marcia and convinces her he has reformed because of her. She tells him she loves him too.

When Lanyard leaves Marcia's mansion, the police follow him, giving Morphew the opportunity to steal Marcia's jewels and plant Lanyard's discarded cigarette at the scene. Crane comes the next morning to apprehend Lanyard, but he has no difficulty locking Crane in a closet so he can clear himself. Lanyard telephones Morphew's henchmen, tipping him off that the Lone Wold is loose; the crooks panic and, unable to reach Morphew by phone, hail a taxi (driven by Jenkins) and give Jenkins the address of Morphew's place. While Jenkins drives to a police station, Lanyard searches for the jewels. When Liane phones, Lanyard pretends to be Morphew and learns where the loot is hidden. Morphew and the Mallisons arrive, followed by Crane, but Lanyard has already left with the jewelry, leaving a note for Crane. Crane has no evidence, but as he is leaving, he takes the phone off the hook and listens in while the crooks accuse each other of taking the jewels. He returns and takes them into custody. Lanyard returns the jewels to Marcia, with an addition: an engagement ring.

== Cast ==
- Melvyn Douglas as Michael [Lanyard]
- Gail Patrick as Marcia [Stewart]
- Tala Birell as Liane [Mallison]
- Henry Mollison as ["Mal"] Mallison
- Thurston Hall as [Inspector] Crane
- Raymond Walburn as Jenkins
- Douglass Dumbrille as Morphew
- Nana Bryant as Aunt Julie [Stewart]
- Robert Middlemass as [Chief of Detectives] Mc Gowan
- Robert Emmett O'Connor as [Detective] Benson

== Reception ==
The New York Times critic Frank Nugent gave the film a poor review, writing, "the time may pass pleasantly enough if this sort of thing is new to you, or if you may be beguiled into a more charitable mood by the performances of Mr. Douglas, Douglas Dumbrille and Raymond Walburn or by the beauty of Gail Patrick and Tala Birell. Speaking for ourselves, we thought the Lone Wolf had picked the wrong night to howl—wrong by fifteen years."
