= Maurice Hewlett =

English historical novelist, poet and essayist

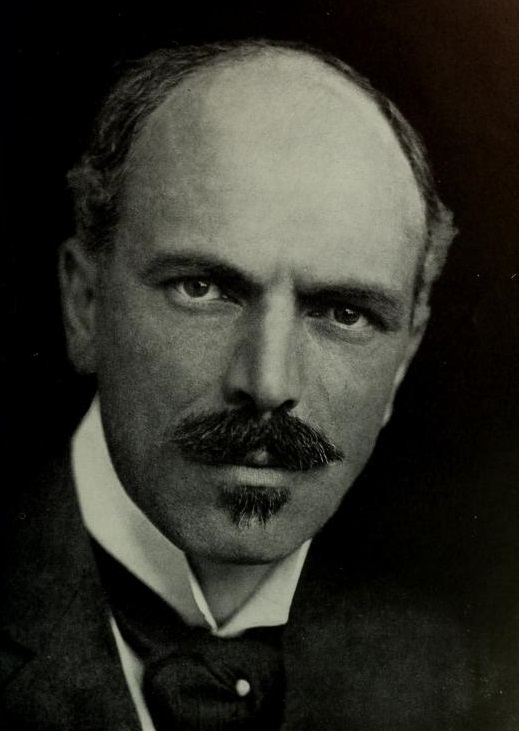
Portrait of Maurice Hewlett

Maurice Henry Hewlett (1861 – 15 June 1923) was an English historical novelist, poet and essayist.

== Biography ==
He was born at Weybridge, the eldest son of Henry Gay Hewlett, of Shaw Hall, Addington, Kent. He was educated at the London International College, Spring Grove, Isleworth, and was called to the bar in 1891. He gave up the law after the success of The Forest Lovers. From 1896 to 1901 he was Keeper of Lands, Revenues, Records and Enrolments, a government post as adviser on matters of medieval law.

Hewlett married Hilda Beatrice Herbert on 3 January 1888 in St Peter's Church, Vauxhall, where her father was the incumbent vicar. The couple had two children, a daughter, Pia, and a son, Francis, but separated in 1914, partly due to Hilda's increasing interest in aviation. In 1911, Hilda had become the first woman in the UK to gain a pilot's licence.

He settled at Broad Chalke, Wiltshire. His friends included Evelyn Underhill, and Ezra Pound, whom he met at the Poets' Club in London. He was also a friend of J. M. Barrie, who named one of the pirates in Peter Pan "Cecco" after Hewlett's son.

Hewlett's 1900 novel The Life and Death of Richard Yea-and-Nay, about Richard the Lionheart, was a favourite novel of T. E. Lawrence. Lawrence said he had read The Life and Death of Richard Yea-and-Nay several times. Another of Hewlett's historical novels was The Queen's Quair (1904), about Mary, Queen of Scots. The Queen's Quair was cited as an influence by Ford Madox Ford, who said that The Queen's Quair "taught me a good deal". Hewlett also wrote six novels based on the Icelandic family sagas, these include The Light Heart and Thorgils of Treadholt. Hewlett also wrote The Outlaw (based on Gisli's Saga), A Lover's Tale (based on Kormak's Saga), Frey and His Wife (based on Ogmund Dytt's tale), and Gudred the Fair (based on the Greenland sagas).

Hewlett was parodied by Max Beerbohm in A Christmas Garland in the part titled "Fond Hearts Askew".

Hewlett's brother Henry William Hewlett was also a published novelist, writing under the name William Hewlett.

Hewlett died in London on 15 June 1923 at age 62.

== Works ==
- Earthwork Out of Tuscany (1895) – travel
- The Masque of Dead Florentines (1895) – verse
- Songs and Meditations (1897)
- The Forest Lovers (1898) – historical novel
- Pan and the Young Shepherd (1898) – play
- Youngest of the Angels (1898) – play
- Little Novels of Italy (1899) – short stories
- The Life and Death of Richard Yea-and-Nay (1900) – (AKA Richard Yea-and-Nay) – historical novel
- The New Canterbury Tales (1901)
- The Queen's Quair or The Six Years' Tragedy (1904) – historical novel about Mary, Queen of Scots
- The Road in Tuscany. A Commentary (1904) – travel; illustrations by Joseph Pennell
- Fond Adventures: Tales of the Youth of the World (1905) – short stories
- Buondelomente's Saga (1905) – historical novel
- The Fool Errant (1905) – historical novel
- The Heart's Key (1905) – historical novel
- The Love Chase (1905) – historical novel
- The Stooping Lady (1907) – historical novel
- The Spanish Jade (1908) – historical novel set in Spain in 1860.
- Artemision (1909) – poems
- Halfway House (1908) – novel
- Open Country (1909) – novel
- Rest Harrow (1910) – novel
- Letters to Sanchia (1910)
- The Agonists, a Trilogy of God and Man (1911)
- The Song of Renny (1911)
- Brazenhead the Great (1911)
- The Countess of Picpus (1911) – historical novel
- Mrs. Lancelot: A Comedy of Assumptions (1912) – historical novel
- The Lore of Proserpine (1913) – autobiographical account
- Helen Redeemed (1913) – poetry
- Bendish (1913) – historical novel
- For Two Voices (1914) – poem
- The Little Iliad (1915)
- A Lover's Tale (1915) – historical novel
- The Song of the Plow (1916)
- Frey and his Wife (1916)
- The Loving History of Peridore & Paravail (1917) – poem
- Thorgils of Treadholt (1917) – historical novel
- Gudrid the Fair (1918) – historical novel
- The Village Wife's Lament (1918) – poems
- In Green Shade (1920)
- Mainwaring (1920) – historical novel
- The Light Heart (1920) – historical novel
- Outlaw (1920) – historical novel
- Wiltshire Essays (1921)
- Extemporary Essays (1922)
- The Last Essays of Maurice Hewlett (1924)
- The Letters of Maurice Hewlett (1926) – edited by Laurence Binyon

== Filmography ==
- The Spanish Jade (1915)
- The Spanish Jade (1922)
- Open Country (1922)
