= The Spanish Jade (1915 film) =

- Directed by: Wilfred Lucas
- Screenplay by: Maurice Hewlett; Louis Joseph Vance
- Starring: Betty Bellairs; Wilfred Lucas; Nigel De Brulier; Arthur Tavares; Frank Lanning; Howard Davies
- Cinematography: Enrique Juan Vallejo
- Production company: Fiction Pictures, Inc.
- Distributed by: Paramount Pictures
- Release date: April 11, 1915
- Running time: 60 minutes
- Country: United States
- Language: English

The Spanish Jade is a 1915 American drama silent film directed by Wilfred Lucas, written by Maurice Hewlett and Louis Joseph Vance, and starring Betty Bellairs, Wilfred Lucas, Nigel De Brulier, Arthur Tavares, Frank Lanning and Howard Davies. It was released on April 11, 1915, by Paramount Pictures. It was the first film produced by Fiction Pictures, Inc., a short-lived production company founded by Vance.

== Cast ==
- Betty Bellairs as Manuela
- Wilfred Lucas as Osmund Manvers
- Nigel De Brulier as Don Luis
- Arthur Tavares as Don Bartolome
- Frank Lanning as Tormillo
- Howard Davies as Gil Perez
- Lloyd Ingraham as Sebastian

== See also ==
- The Spanish Jade (1922)
