= Alias the Lone Wolf =

1927 mystery film

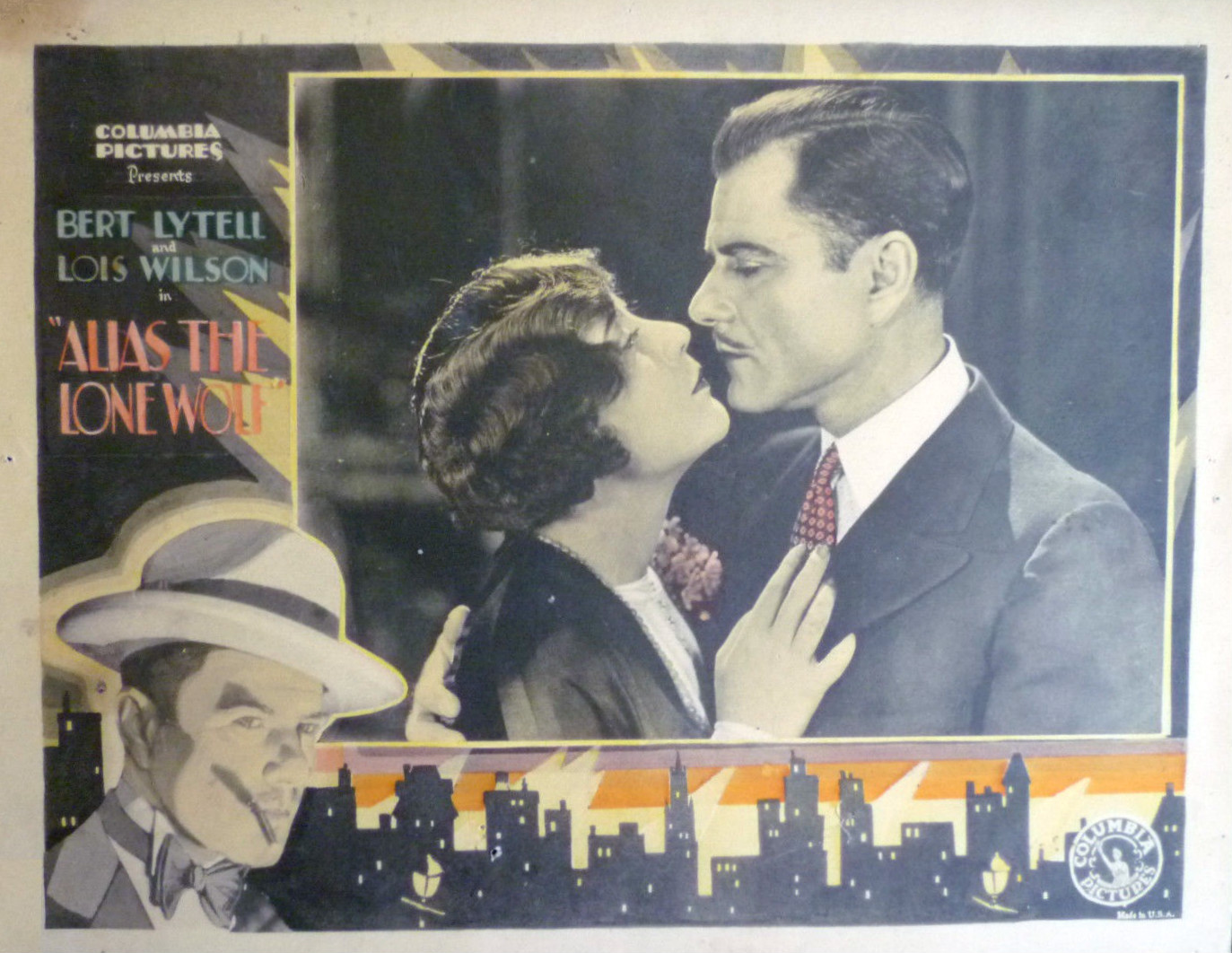
- Lobby card
- Directed by: Edward H. Griffith
- Screenplay by: Dorothy Howell; Edward H. Griffith
- Based on: Alias the Lone Wolf by Louis Joseph Vance
- Produced by: Harry Cohn
- Starring: Bert Lytell; Lois Wilson; William V. Mong; Ned Sparks
- Cinematography: J.O. Taylor
- Production company: Columbia Pictures
- Distributed by: Columbia Pictures
- Release date: August 22, 1927
- Running time: 7 reels
- Country: United States
- Language: Silent (English intertitles)

Alias the Lone Wolf is a 1927 American silent mystery film directed by Edward H. Griffith. The film is based on the 1921 novel of the same name by Louis Joseph Vance.

== Cast ==
- Bert Lytell as Michael Lanyard
- Lois Wilson as Eve de Montalais
- William V. Mong as Whitaker Monk
- Ned Sparks as Phinuit
- James Mason as Popinot
- Paulette Duval as Liane Delorme
- Ann Brody as Fifi
- Alphonse Ethier as Inspector Crane

== Preservation and status ==
A complete copy of the film is held at the UCLA Film & Television Archive.
