= Louis Joseph Vance =

American novelist

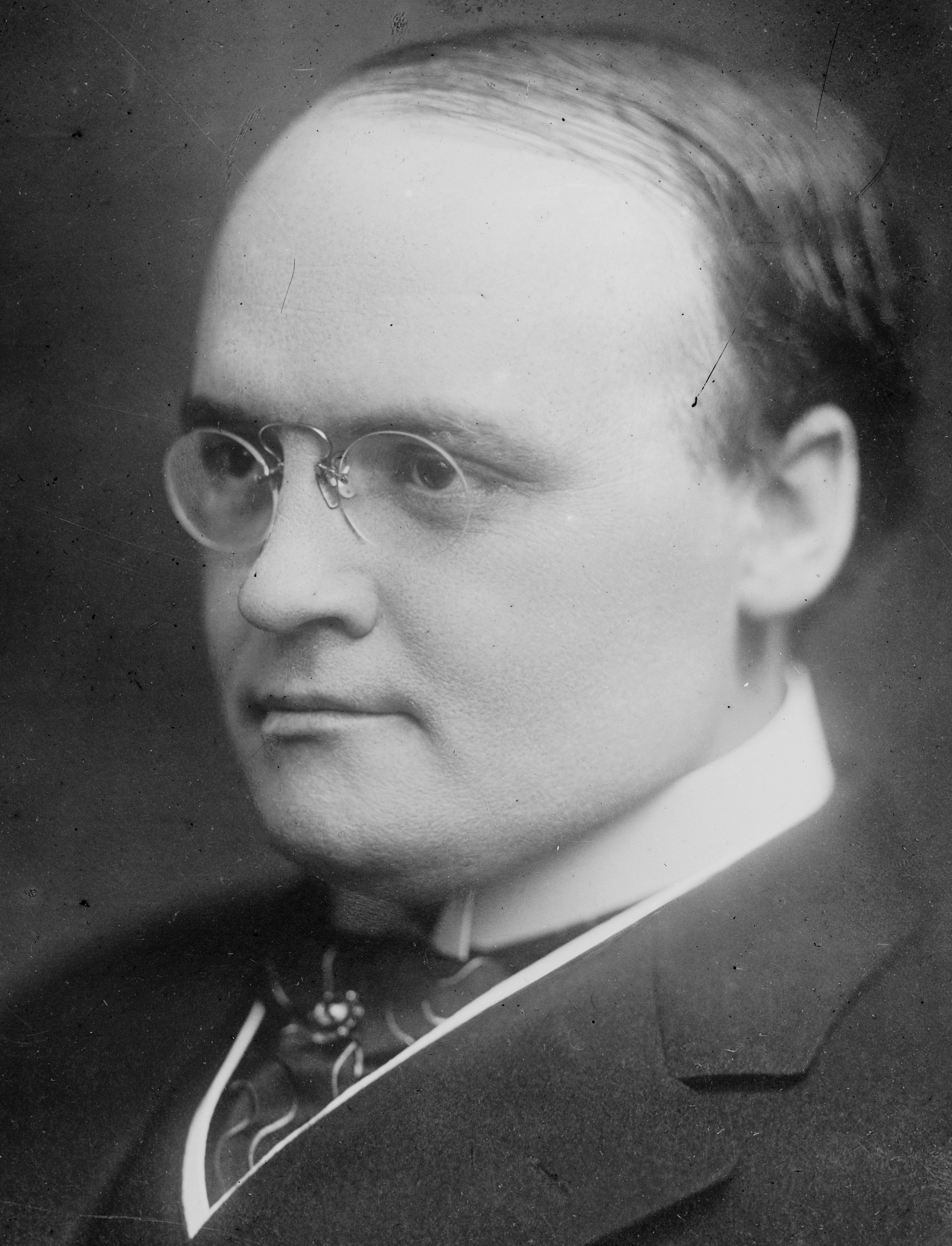
- Vance c. 1920s
- Born: Louis Joseph Vance; September 19, 1879; Washington, D.C., U.S.
- Died: December 16, 1933 (aged 54); New York City, U.S.
- Occupations: Novelist; screenwriter; film producer
- Notable work: The Lone Wolf stories

Louis Joseph Vance (September 19, 1879 – December 16, 1933) was an American novelist, screenwriter and film producer. He created the popular character Michael Lanyard, a criminal-turned-detective known as the Lone Wolf.

== Early life ==
Louis Joseph Vance was born September 19, 1879, in Washington, D. C., the only child of Wilson J. Vance, a Medal of Honor recipient, and Lillian Beall. He was educated at the Brooklyn Polytechnic Institute. Vance was married to Anne Elizabeth Hodges on February 19, 1898. Their son, Wilson Beall Vance, was born in 1900.

== Career ==
He wrote short stories and verse after 1901, then composed many popular novels. His character Michael Lanyard, known as The Lone Wolf, was featured in eight books and 24 films between 1914 and 1949 and also appeared in radio and television series.

Vance moved to Los Angeles to work with Universal Pictures on films based on his work, including The Trey o' Hearts (1914) and a serial and film series (1914–1916) based on his Terence O'Rourke stories. In 1915, he founded Fiction Pictures, Inc., a motion picture production company whose films were distributed by Paramount Pictures. Its first release was The Spanish Jade (1915), with a screenplay by Vance based on his stage adaptation of a novel by Maurice Hewlett. Vance was president and general manager of the company; other principals were Wilfred Lucas (director-general), Gilbert Warrenton (cinematographer) and Bess Meredyth (scenario editor). Fiction Pictures operated in Glendale until a new studio in Hollywood was completed in April 1915. The studio was sold to Famous Players in June, when Fiction Pictures went out of business.

His book Cynthia of the Minute was adapted into a film with Leah Baird in it.

== Death and burial ==
Vance died alone in his New York City apartment on December 16, 1933, in a fire that resulted from his falling asleep with a lighted cigarette. His death was ruled accidental. A simple funeral took place December 20, 1933, at St. George's Protestant Episcopal Church in Brooklyn, with honorary pallbearers including Marc Connelly, Will Irwin and Samuel Merwin. Vance's widow received an estate of less than $10,000.

== Books ==
- Terence O'Rourke, Gentleman Adventurer (1905)
  at Internet Archive
- The Private War (1906)
- The Brass Bowl (1907)
  at Gutenberg
  at Wikisource
- The Black Bag (1908)
  at Gutenberg
- The Bronze Bell (1909)
  at Gutenberg
- The Pool of Flame (1909)
  at Internet Archive
- Fortune Hunter (1910)
  at Gutenberg
- No Man's Land (1910)
  at Internet Archive
- Cynthia of the Minute (1911)
- The Bandbox (1912)
  at Gutenberg
- The Destroying Angel (1912)
  at Gutenberg
- The Day of Days: An Extravaganza (1913)
  at Gutenberg
- Joan Thursday (1913)
  at Gutenberg
- The Trey O' Hearts (1914)
  at Internet Archive
- The Lone Wolf (LW1) (1914)
  at Gutenberg
  at Wikisource
- Nobody (1915)
  at Gutenberg
- Sheep's Clothing (1915)
- The Last of The Fighting Channings (1916)
- The False Faces (LW2) (1918)
  at Gutenberg
  at Wikisource
- The Dark Mirror (1920)
- Alias the Lone Wolf (LW3) (1921)
  at Gutenberg
- Red Masquerade (LW4) (1921)
  at Gutenberg
- Linda Lee Incorporated (1922)
  at Gutenberg
- Baroque: A Mystery (1923)
- The Lone Wolf Returns (LW5) (1923)
- Mrs. Paramor (1923; basis of the 1924 film Married Flirts)
- Road to En Dor (1925)
- The Dead Ride Hard (1926)
- White Fire (1926)
- They Call It Love (1927)
- Lip-Service (1927)
- Speaking of Women (1930)
- Woman in the Shadow (1930)
- The Lone Wolf's Son (LW6) (1931)
- The Trembling Flame (1931)
- Detective (1932)
- Encore the Lone Wolf (LW7) (1933)
- The Lone Wolf's Last Prowl (LW8) (1934)
- The Street of Strange Faces (1934)

== Filmography ==
=== Film adaptations ===
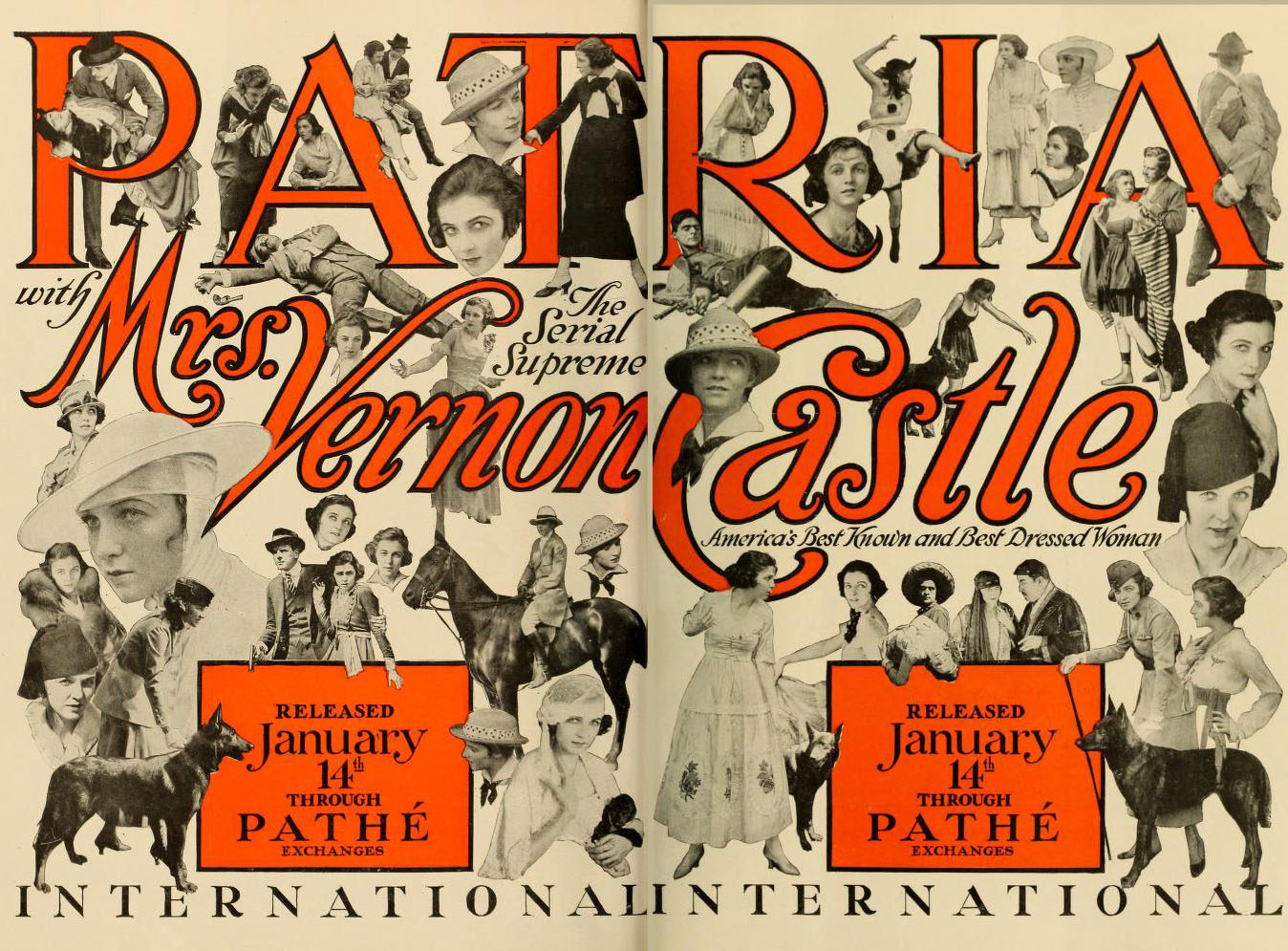
Ad for Patria (1917), starring Irene Castle

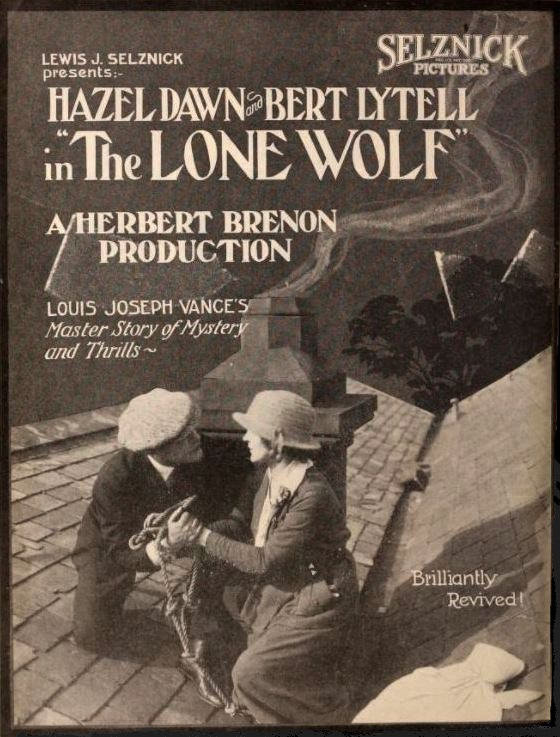
Ad for The Lone Wolf (1917)

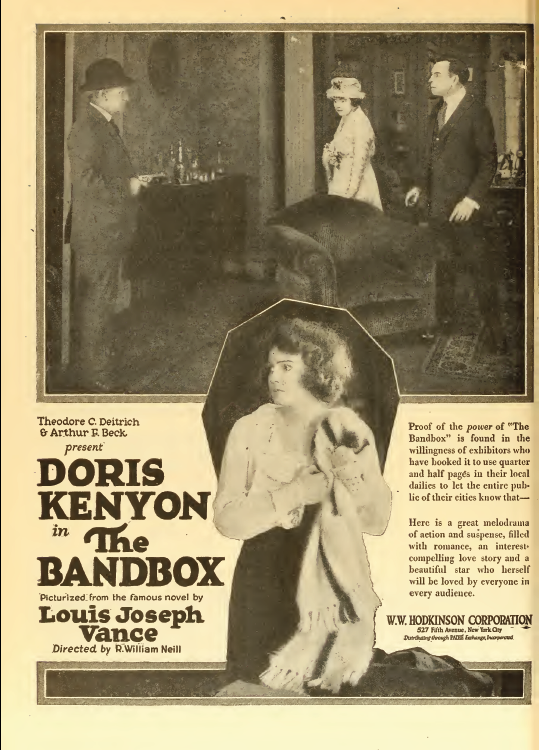
Ad for The Bandbox (1919)

- The Day of Days (1914)
- The Brass Bowl (short, 1914)
- The Trey o' Hearts (serial, 1914)
- Sheep's Clothing (short, 1914)
- Terence O'Rourke, Gentleman Adventurer (serial, 1914)
- The New Adventures of Terence O'Rourke (serial, 1914)
- The Further Adventures of Terence O'Rourke (serial, 1915)
- The Spanish Jade (1915), Vance's film adaptation of his 1908 play; the first film produced by his company Fiction Pictures, Inc.
- The Destroying Angel (1915),(see also The Destroying Angel (1923) below)
- The Footlights of Fate (1916), from Joan Thursday, (see also Greater Than Marriage (1924) below)
- The Pool of Flame (last film in the Terence O'Rourke series, 1916)
- Patria (serial based on The Last of the Fighting Channings, 1917)
- The Lone Wolf (1917), (see also The Lone Wolf (1924) above)
- The Mainspring (1917), from Vance's short story, "The Mainspring" originally published in Popular Magazine (Apr 1905), (see Lost at Sea (1926) below)
- The Outsider (1917), from Nobody
- No Man's Land (1918)
- The False Faces (1919)
- The Bandbox (1919)
- The Dark Mirror (1920)
- Cynthia-of-the-Minute (1920)
- The Bronze Bell (1921)
- The Black Bag (1922)
- The Spanish Jade (1922), based on Vance's 1908 play The Spanish Jade, co-written with Maurice Henry Hewlett
- The Brass Bowl (1924) (see Masquerade (1927) below)
- The Destroying Angel (1923) (see also The Destroying Angel (1916) above)
- Greater Than Marriage (1924), from Joan Thursday, (see also The Footlights of Fate (1916) above)
- The Lone Wolf (1924), (see also The Lone Wolf (1917) above)
- Married Flirts (1924), based on the novel Mrs. Paramor
- The Lone Wolf Returns (1926), (see The Lone Wolf Returns (1935) below)
- Lost at Sea (1926), from Vance's short story, "The Mainspring" originally published in Popular Magazine (Apr 1905), (see The Mainspring (1917) above)
- Alias the Lone Wolf (1927)
- Masquerade (1929), based on The Brass Bowl (see The Brass Bowl (1924) above)
- The Last of the Lone Wolf (1930), based on Vance's short story "The Last of the Lone Wolf"
- Cheaters at Play (1932), based on Vance's short story "The Lone Wolf's Son" published in Red Book Magazine (1931)
- The Lone Wolf Returns (1935), (see The Lone Wolf Returns (1926) above)
- The Lone Wolf In Paris (1938), based on The Lone Wolf Returns, (see The Lone Wolf Returns (1926) and The Lone Wolf Returns (1935) above)

In addition to adaptations of his novels, the following films, while not straight adaptations, were based on the characters from Vance's Lone Wolf series:

- The Lone Wolf's Daughter (1929)
- The Lone Wolf Spy Hunt (1939)
- The Lone Wolf Keeps a Date (1940)
- The Lone Wolf Meets a Lady (1940)
- The Lone Wolf Strikes (1940)
- The Lone Wolf Takes a Chance (1941)
- Secrets of the Lone Wolf (1941)
- Counter-Espionage (1942)
- One Dangerous Night (1943)
- Passport to Suez (1943)
- The Notorious Lone Wolf (1946)
- The Lone Wolf in London (1947)
- The Lone Wolf in Mexico (1947)
- The Lone Wolf and His Lady (1949)

=== Screenwriter ===
- The Secret Kingdom (1916)
- The Inn of the Blue Moon (1918)
- Wild Honey (1918)
- Twilight (1919)
- The Lone Wolf's Daughter (1919)
- Love (1920)
- Beau Revel (1921)
- The King of the Turf (1926)

== See also ==
- Lone Wolf (fictional detective)
