= The Lone Wolf Keeps a Date =

1940 film by Sidney Salkow

- Theatrical release poster
- Directed by: Sidney Salkow
- Screenplay by: Sidney Salkow; Earl Felton
- Based on: Lone Wolf by Louis Joseph Vance
- Produced by: Irving Briskin
- Starring: Warren William; Frances Robinson; Bruce Bennett
- Cinematography: Barney McGill
- Edited by: Richard Fantl
- Music by: Sidney Cutner
- Production company: Columbia Pictures
- Distributed by: Columbia Pictures
- Release date: November 23, 1940
- Running time: 65 minutes
- Country: United States
- Language: English

The Lone Wolf Keeps a Date is a 1940 American mystery crime film directed by Sidney Salkow and starring Warren William, Frances Robinson, Bruce Bennett and Eric Blore. It is the sixth Lone Wolf film produced by Columbia Pictures. It features William in his fourth appearance as the title character and Edward Gargan, Lester Matthews and Don Beddoe as the film's antagonists. The screenplay was written by Salkow and Earl Felton.

The film centers on former jewel thief Michael Lanyard, also known by his alias Lone Wolf, who aims to recover his stamp collection and rescues a damsel in distress. Filming took place in August and September 1940. The Lone Wolf Keeps a Date was released in the United States in January 1941. It was followed by The Lone Wolf Takes a Chance, later that same year.

== Plot ==
After adding a rare Cuban stamp to his coveted collection and admonishing his butler Jamison for winning money in a rigged dice game in Havana, retired jewel thief and unofficial private detective Michael Lanyard (the Lone Wolf), meets gorgeous Patricia Lawrence when she shares their horse-drawn carriage to the airport, to catch the flying boat to Miami.

At the Miami airport, they are ambushed by kidnappers Chimp and Mr. Lee, employees of Big Joe Brady. The Lone Wolf swiftly outruns the criminals with Lawrence. Initially reserved, Lawrence confides her troubles to Lanyard: one of her boyfriend Scotty's clients was killed some time ago after retaining Scotty to send a package stuffed with $100,000 in bank notes. Lanyard is discovered by Inspector Crane and his buffoonish assistant Wesley Dickens along with Miami police captain Moon. Lanyard evades capture and sets out to expose the three villains on his own. The detective also realizes that his prized stamp collection has been swiped by Big Joe Brady. He tracks them down and has them arrested. After many chases, double-crosses and switches, the Lone Wolf exonerates himself and Lawrence's boyfriend Scotty.

== Cast ==
- Warren William as Michael Lanyard
- Frances Robinson as Patricia Lawrence
- Bruce Bennett as Scotty
- Eric Blore as Jamison
- Thurston Hall as Inspector Crane
- Jed Prouty as Captain Moon
- Fred Kelsey as Dickens
- Don Beddoe as Big Joe Brady
- Lester Matthews as Mr. Lee
- Edward Gargan as Chimp
- Eddie Laughton as Measles
- Mary Servoss as Mrs. Colby
- Francis McDonald as Santos the Portuguese

== Production ==
The Lone Wolf title character is played by Warren William, his fourth time doing so. Although Walter Baldwin is listed in studio documents as playing a night watchman in the film, he did not actually appear in it.

Sidney Salkow directed the film for Columbia Pictures, while Salkow and Earl Felton cowrote the screenplay based on the detective character created by Louis Joseph Vance in a series of eight novels published between 1914 and 1934. Barney McGill was the film's as cinematographer, Morris Stoloff headed the musical direction and Richard Fantl edited the film. Principal photography began on August 21, 1940, and ended in mid-September 1940.

== Release and reception ==
Through the release print lists a copyright date of 1940, the film was officially released in North American cinemas in January 1941. It is alternatively known as Revenge of the Lone Wolf and Alias the Lone Wolf. In his 2010 book Mystery Movie Series of 1940s Hollywood, Ron Backer wrote that the film "is the best of the Warren William Lone Wolf movies," although "it seems to lack that certain something that made the earlier Lone Wolf movies so entertaining." He concluded that the film made "a good entry in the Lone Wolf series, with less sexual violence this time round." In contrast, Leonard Maltin wrote in his Movie & Video Guide (1998) that the film was "listless."

== Bibliography ==
- Gene Blottner (2012). Columbia Pictures Movie Series, 1926—1955: The Harry Cohn Years. McFarland. ISBN 978-0-7864-3353-7.
- Ron Backer (2010). Mystery Movie Series of 1940s Hollywood. McFarland. ISBN 978-0-7864-5700-7.
- Leonard Maltin (October 1998). Leonard Maltin's Movie & Video Guide. Plume. ISBN 978-0-452-27992-6.
