= The Lone Wolf Returns (1926 film) =

1926 film by Ralph Ince

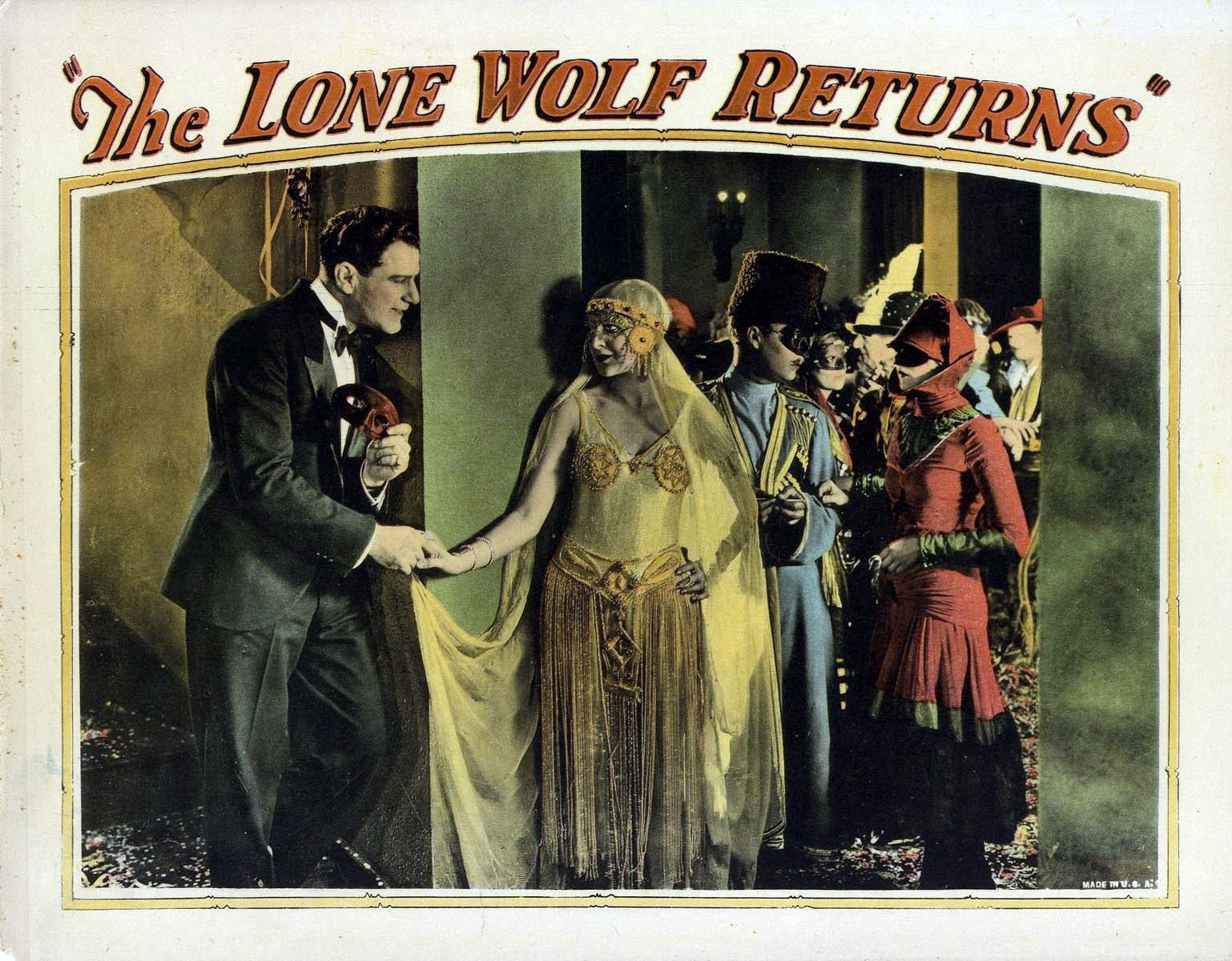
- Lobby card
- Directed by: Ralph Ince
- Written by: Louis Joseph Vance
- Based on: The Lone Wolf Returns by J. Grubb Alexander
- Starring: Bert Lytell; Billie Dove; Freeman Wood
- Cinematography: J.O. Taylor
- Production company: Columbia Pictures
- Distributed by: Columbia Pictures
- Release date: August 15, 1926
- Running time: 6 reels
- Country: United States
- Language: Silent (English intertitles)

The Lone Wolf Returns is a 1926 American silent mystery film directed by Ralph Ince and starring Bert Lytell, Billie Dove, and Freeman Wood. It is the first of Columbia Pictures' long-running series of Lone Wolf films.

== Plot ==
As described in a film magazine review, crook Michael Lanyard, known internationally as the Lone Wolf, is discovered while rifling a home in a fashionable section of town. He escapes by a ruse and climbs the balcony of another house, Marcia Mayfair's home, where a masque ball is underway. Marcia dances with Michael, and they have mutual attraction. The detectives arrive and when they ask Marcia if she can guarantee everyone who is present, she nods in the affirmative even though she does not know Michael. There is also a gang of crooks present who are intent on securing the Mayfair pearls. They are angered as the Lone Wolf is present and interfering with their plans. Morphew, head of the gang, exposes Michael to Marcia. The gang of crooks finally get the jewels and suspicion points to Michael. He asks the detective on the case to give him until midnight to prove his innocence, which he is anxious to do on account of his feelings for Marcia. The detective, who suspects the society crooks, assents. Michael secures and returns the jewels, and goes to Marcia, who embraces him.

== Cast ==
- Bert Lytell as Michael Lanyard
- Billie Dove as Marcia Mayfair
- Freeman Wood as Mallison
- Gustav von Seyffertitz as Morphew
- Gwen Lee as Liane De Lorme
- Alphonse Ethier as Crane

== Preservation ==
A complete print of The Lone Wolf Returns is preserved in the George Eastman Museum Motion Picture Collection.

== Bibliography ==
- Quinlan, David. The Illustrated Guide to Film Directors. Batsford, 1983. ISBN 978-0389204084
