= Counter-Espionage =

1942 film

- Directed by: Edward Dmytryk
- Screenplay by: Aubrey Wisberg
- Based on: Louis Joseph Vance
- Produced by: Wallace MacDonald
- Starring: Warren William; Eric Blore; Hillary Brooke
- Cinematography: Philip Tannura
- Edited by: Gene Havlick
- Music by: M. W. Stoloff
- Distributed by: Columbia Pictures Corporation
- Release date: September 3, 1942
- Running time: 73 minutes
- Country: United States
- Language: English

Counter-Espionage is a 1942 American comedy film directed by Edward Dmytryk. Counter-Espionage was the ninth film in Columbia's Lone Wolf series, based on characters created by Louis Joseph Vance. It is also known as The Lone Wolf in Scotland Yard. The film was followed by One Dangerous Night, released in 1943.

== Plot ==
During World War II, Harvey Leeds, working as secretary for the highly reputed British criminologist Sir Stafford Hart in London, is lobbying for legislation ordering the immediate arrest of all foreign agents stationed in Britain. Harvey is engaged to Sir Stafford's daughter, Pamela, and is visiting the Hart mansion. He is about to leave the mansion to be with Pamela, who works at an air raid shelter, when he happens upon a briefcase in the foyer. He looks through the briefcase that belongs to Sir Stafford's assistant, Kent Wells, before heading out in the night. He is knocked out by Air Raid Warden Anton Schugg and thrown into the back of the warden's ambulance.

Kent Wells happens to see Harvey go through his briefcase, and when he goes upstairs, he sees someone opening Sir Stafford's safe. Before Wells can do anything, the man is off with the plans for the government's new secret weapon - the beam detector. The man drops a cufflink with the letter "L" on it.

Sir Stafford calls Scotland Yard in. Two American inspectors, Crane and Dickens, are visiting the Yard and are invited by the chief investigator on the case, Inspector J. Stephens. The three men go to the Hart mansion and conclude that the "L" must mean that notorious jewel thief Michael Lanyard, the "Lone Wolf", is the culprit.

An air raid hits London, and during the ensuing commotion, the Lone Wolf meets with his valet Jamison. The building closest to them begins to topple, and the Lone Wolf saves Air Raid Warden George Barrow from being crushed. During the rest of the raid, the Lone Wolf and his valet hide out in the air raid shelter where Pamela works. The Lone Wolf tries to hide the plans, but Inspector Stephens arrives and arrests him for espionage. Stephens does not find the plans though, and Jamison manages to get them back after the Lone Wolf is taken away.

During interrogation, the Lone Wolf manages to grab a gun and take Sir Stafford hostage. He escapes and happens to meets Schugg outside, who gives him a ride, although not oblivious of his crime. Schugg offers the Lone Wolf a deal. He wants to buy the plans. In charge of the ring is Gustave Sossel. When the Lone Wolf is taken to the German hideout, he also discovers that Harvey is their prisoner. The Lone Wolf explains that he does not have the plans, but he can retrieve them in a few days. Kent appears and explains that he captured Harvey because he was too nosy. He also explains that the Germans intend to transmit the plans to Berlin with a radio transmitter at the hideout. The Lone Wolf is then released with instructions to inform Schugg when he has the plans.

The newspapers report that Sir Stafford has died in the air raid. When Inspector Stephens visits the Hart mansion, he discovers a secret document sanctioning the Lone Wolf to work undercover for British Intelligence to catch a ring of spies. Later, the Lone Wolf also makes contact with the Hart mansion, thus leading the police away from the mansion and to his own apartment. The Lone Wolf then goes in search of the German hideout, but discovers that Pamela is following.

Lanyard tricks her into phoning Stephens so that there will be police reinforcements in the district surrounding the spies' headquarters. Pamela alerts the police of their whereabouts, and they surround the hideout, believing they are close to catching the thief. The Lone Wolf escapes the ring of police by riding in Barrow's ambulance. The Lone Wolf then returns to where he believes the hideout is, under the Blue Parrot Café, and finds Pamela there. They are both apprehended by the German agents and taken to Sossel. It turns out Kent's real name is Kurt Weil, and that he is a German agent. The three police inspectors, who have tracked the Lone Wolf, are also captured. When the Germans start broadcasting the plans, Barrow arrives and pretends to hold a stick of dynamite in his hand. The German agents throw down their guns, and the Lone Wolf explains to the Germans that the plans were fake, bait to find the spy ring. The Lone Wolf then gives the real plans to the police.

== Cast ==
- Warren William as Michael Lanyard
- Eric Blore as Jamison
- Hillary Brooke as Pamela Hart
- Thurston Hall as Insp. Crane
- Fred Kelsey as Detective Wesley Dickens
- Forrest Tucker as Anton Schugg
- Matthew Boulton as Inspector J. Stephens
- Kurt Katch as Gustav Soessel
- Morton Lowry as Kurt Weil, alias Kent Wells
- Leslie Denison as Harvey Leeds
- Billy Bevan as George Barrow
- Stanley Logan as Sir Stafford Hart
- Tom Stevenson as Police Sergeant Hopkins
- Lloyd Bridges as Waiter at the Blue Parrot Cafe
