= The Lone Wolf (1917 film) =

1917 film by Herbert Brenon

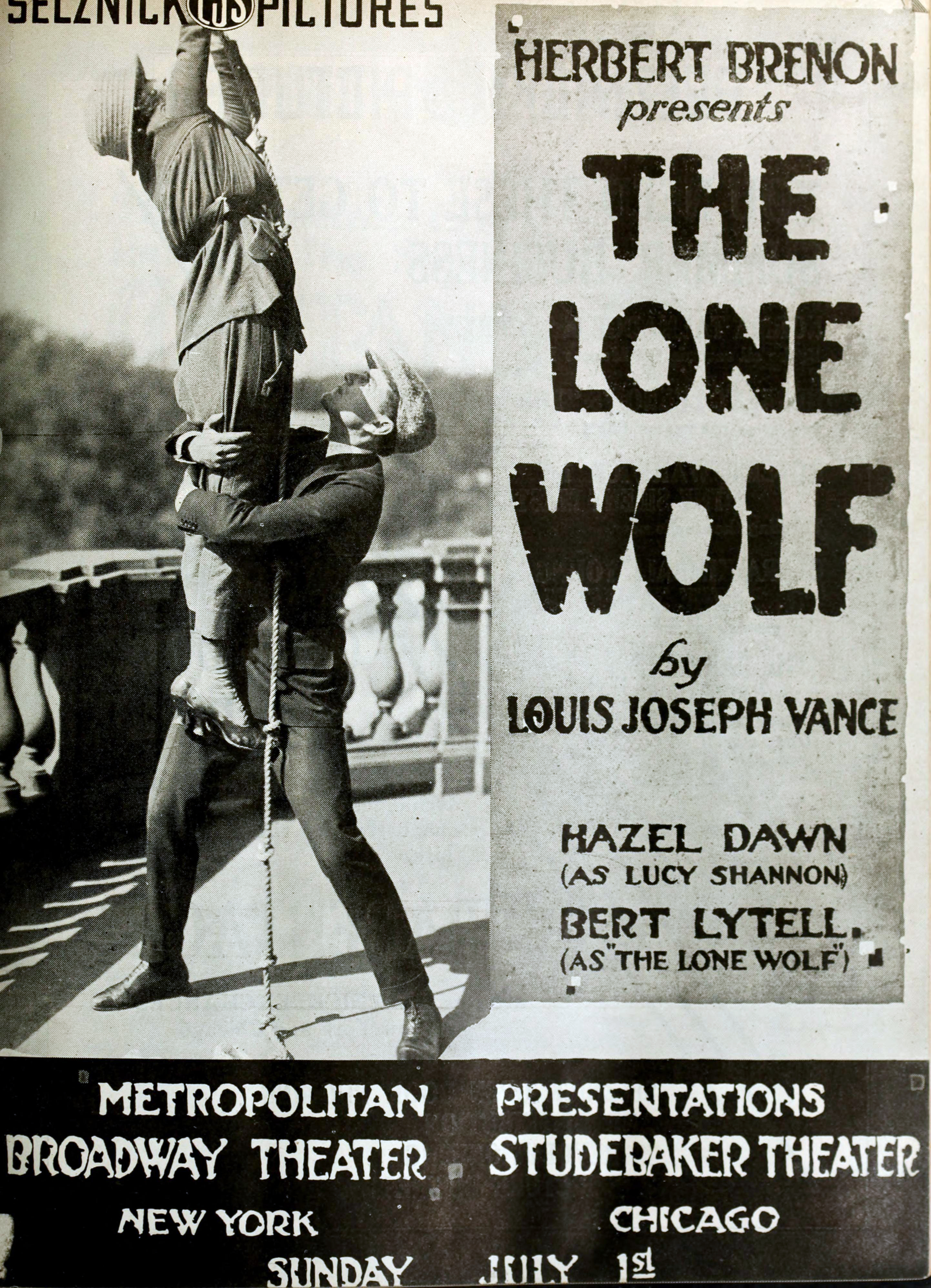
- Advertisement in Moving Picture World
- Directed by: Herbert Brenon
- Screenplay by: George Edwardes-Hall
- Based on: The Lone Wolf by Louis Joseph Vance
- Produced by: Herbert Brenon
- Starring: Bert Lytell; Hazel Dawn
- Cinematography: J. Roy Hunt
- Edited by: James C. McKay
- Production companies: Herbert Brenon; Film Corporation
- Distributed by: Selznick Distributing Corporation
- Release date: July 30, 1917
- Country: United States
- Language: Silent (English intertitles)

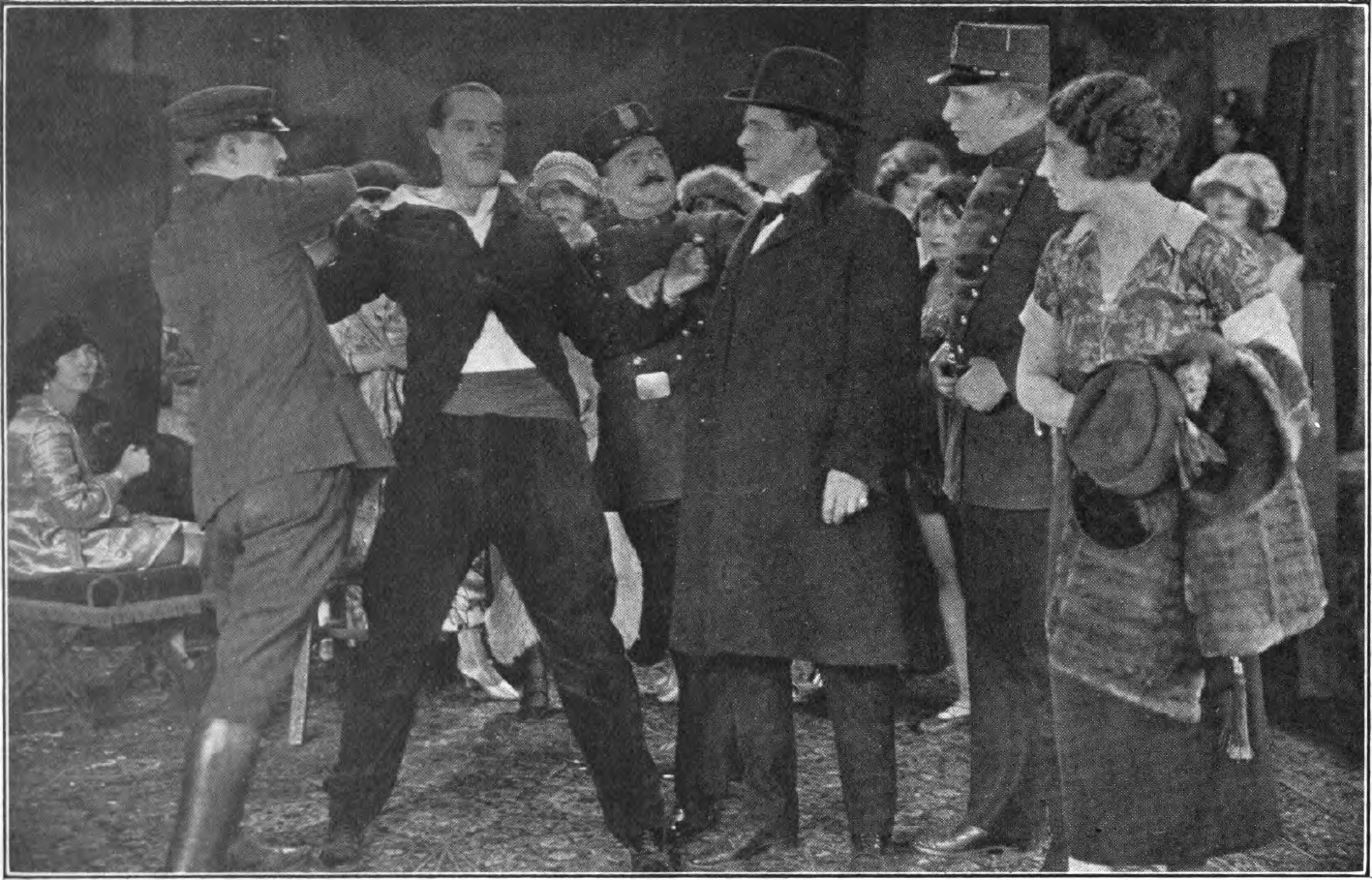
The Lone Wolf photo

The Lone Wolf is a 1917 American silent drama film based on the 1914 novel The Lone Wolf by Louis Joseph Vance. Starring Bert Lytell and Hazel Dawn, it was adapted for the screen by George Edwardes-Hall and produced and directed by Herbert Brenon. No prints of the film are known to survive, so it is currently classified as lost.

== Synopsis ==
Burke is a master crook who adopts a young boy (Marcel) after the boy saves him from being arrested by the police. Burke then teaches the youngster how to be a crook, and after he becomes a master in the profession, he changes his name and works as Michael Lanyard. The Paris police give him the moniker of "The Lone Wolf", due to his unique work in the profession. However, a gang of criminals (The Pack) has taken notice of his clever work, and tell him that unless he joins their gang, they will destroy him. Lucy is an undercover agent posing as a crook to infiltrate the gang, and goes on to help the Wolf escape the gang via a plane to England. The Pack follows them, but are killed in a plane crash. After the gang is killed, "The Wolf" swears he will go straight and he eventually marries Lucy.

== Cast ==
- Hazel Dawn as Lucy Shannon
- Bert Lytell as Michael Lanyard (The Lone Wolf)
- Cornish Beck as Marcel
- Stephen Grattan as Burke
- Alfred Hickman as Eckstrom
- Ben Graham as Thibault
- Robert Fisher as Bannon
- William Riley Hatch as De Moriban
- Joseph Chailles as Popinot
- William E. Shay as Werthheimer
- Edward Abeles as Ducroy
- Florence Ashbrooke as Madame Troyon
- Juliet Brenon as Thibault's maid

== Background ==
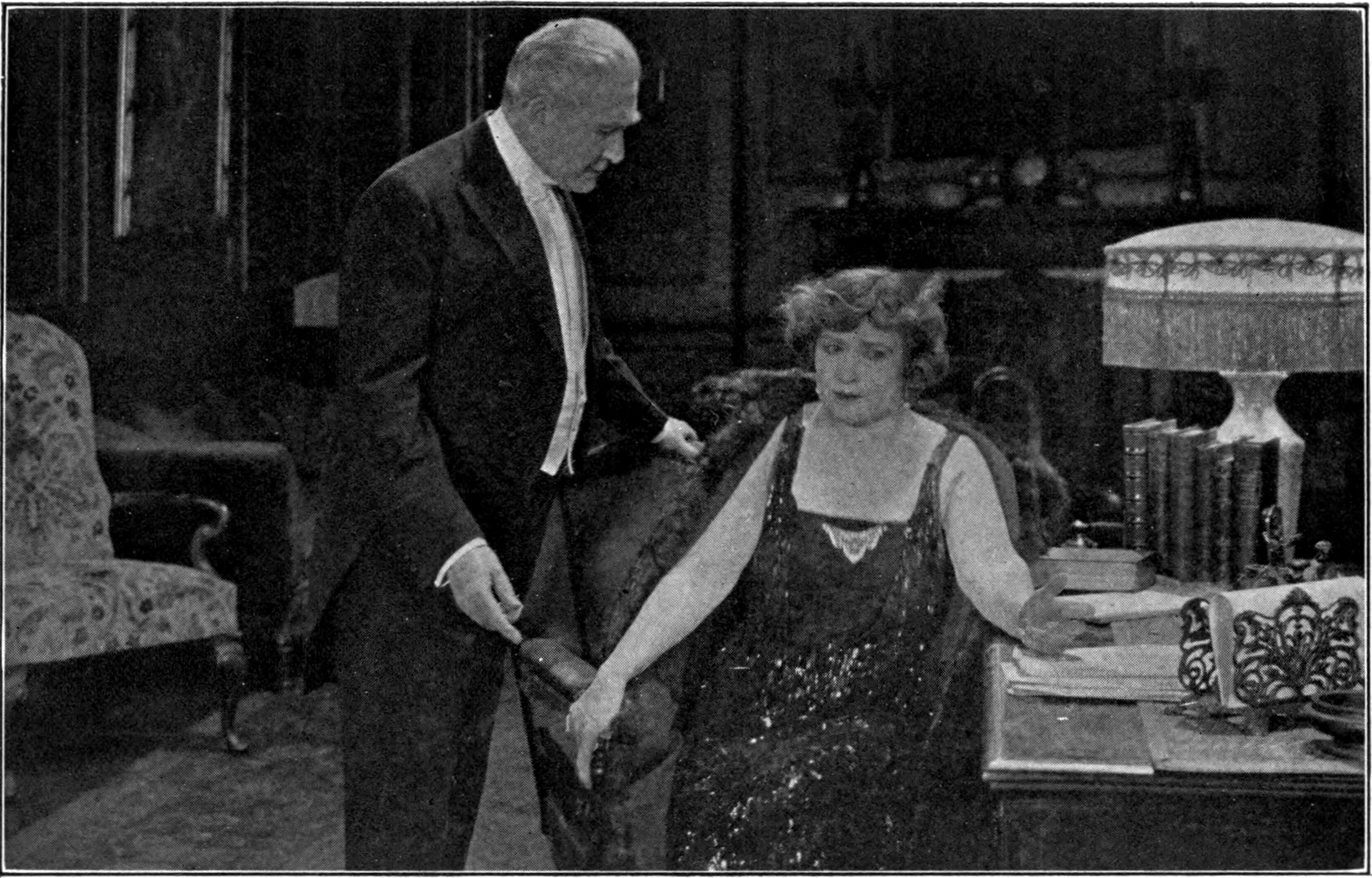
The Lone Wolf photo

The character the Lone Wolf was a popular crime figure in theaters from 1917 to 1949, and was featured in at least twenty-four films. The character was initially developed by Vance in his 1914 novel of the same name. Selznick later purchased the rights from Vance for his 1917 film. Bert Lytell was the first actor to play the role, but Warren William who appeared in nine films featuring the character from 1939 to 1943, was arguably the most closely associated with the role. In 1946 Gerald Mohr followed William as the Wolf for three films through 1948; additionally the Mutual Radio Network broadcast a radio series with Gerald Mohr as the title character, which aired for about six months. In 1954, a television series was created based on Vance's character with Louis Hayward playing the title role. The series was in syndication for one season with 39 episodes produced. The show was also sometimes titled Streets of Danger.

== Reviews and reception ==
Joseph L. Kelley, film critic for Motion Picture News, gave The Lone Wolf high marks, describing it as "a most remarkable production, bristling with tense moments, strong action, human incidents and powerful drama". Kelley also praised Lytell's performance, stating that he "moves with the agility and pep of a Fairbanks", while Hazel Dawn is noted as being "average" in her performance. A review in The New York Clipper, said the film "is a criterion in intense melodrama of the most advanced style. Its embellishments, refinements and polish is the last word in modern picture plays". The Clipper also reported that the film had "gone over heavier than any big feature shown in New York within the last year", and that Selznick had received a big advance demand for the film throughout the country.
