= Zuleika (musical) =

1957 London cast

Zuleika is a musical with music by Peter Tranchell and book and lyrics by James Ferman. The musical is based on the 1911 novel, Zuleika Dobson, by Max Beerbohm.

== History ==
The show was first staged at an undergraduate club at Cambridge in 1954, two years before Beerbohm's death. The impresario Donald Albery acquired the rights to stage it in the West End, and engaged Osbert Lancaster as designer and Alfred Rodrigues as director. The production opened at the Saville Theatre on 11 April 1957. Beerbohm had died the year before, but his widow, Elisabeth interested herself in the production, and attended the first night.

The plot of the novel was generally followed, except for the conclusion, which was changed to provide a happy ending. Beerbohm had insisted that the name of the heroine should be pronounced "Zuleeka", but for the musical the pronunciation was changed to "Zulika", which was thought easier to sing.

The actress originally cast as Zuleika, Diane Cilento, won excellent critical comment when the show previewed in Manchester, but was taken ill before the show opened in London. She was unable to appear, and the part was taken by Mildred Mayne, a performer best known at the time as a model, appearing on posters in the London Underground advertising underwear. A 2011 newspaper obituary for Cilento alleged that her withdrawal from the production was due to a suicide attempt.

== Cast ==
- Katie Batch – Patricia Stark
- Noaks – Peter Woodthorpe
- Lord Sayes – Roderick Cook
- The Hon Charles Trent-Garby – Clive Exton
- Sir John Marraby – Philip Bond
- Oover – Michael O'Connor
- The Duke of Dorset – David Morton
- The Macquern – John Gower
- The Warden of Judas – Daniel Thorndyke
- Zuleika – Mildred Mayne
- Melisande – Hermione Harvey
- Aunt Mabel -- Patricia Routledge

== Music ==
Here is a list of numbers:

- Eights Week
- City of Repose
- Zuleika
- Zuleika's Travels
- Lovely Time
- It's My Doorstep Too!
- All Over Again
- Nellie O'Mora (lyric by Harry Porter)
- Anything Can Happen
- The Last Dance of the Evening
- What Has She Got?
- Always Be Wary of Women
- I Want A Man To Say No
- Someday
- Follow the Fashion
- Seventeen Years From Now

== Critical reception ==
The Times, having called the show "a most pleasing imitation of Edwardian musical comedy", added "Miss Mildred Mayne, taking the part of Zuleika at short notice, is not, perhaps, all that Beerbohm painted her, but she is always engaging and she sings easily and well." In The Manchester Guardian, Philip Hope-Wallace was unconvinced by the new Zuleika: "What the incomparable Max would have thought of Mildred Mayne, the new leading lady, one fails to imagine." In The Observer, Kenneth Tynan called the show "the best British musical since The Boy Friend", but thought Mayne "competent in a role for which competence is not enough"." Rupert Hart-Davis, who accompanied Elisabeth Beerbohm to the first night, was privately less tactful: he called the show "delightfully gay and charming," but added, "the leading lady is quite without looks, charm or talent. With someone like … Marilyn Monroe it would run for ever."

The show ran for 124 performances, closing on 27 July 1957.
