= A Defence of Cosmetics =

Essay by Max Beerbohm

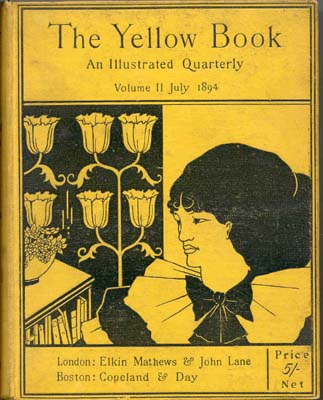
The Yellow Book, with a cover illustrated by Aubrey Beardsley

"A Defence of Cosmetics" is an essay by caricaturist and parodist Max Beerbohm and published in the first edition of The Yellow Book in April 1894. Aged 21 when the essay was published, it established his reputation. It later appeared in his first book, The Works of Max Beerbohm (1896) as "The Pervasion of Rouge".

Written while still an undergraduate at Merton College, Oxford, Beerbohm intended that his essay "A Peep into the Past", a satire on Oscar Wilde, should be published in the first number of The Yellow Book, but it was held over to make way for another essay, "A Defence of Cosmetics", which appeared in that journal in April 1894. "A Peep into the Past" was possibly withheld because of the impending Wilde scandal. When it was published, "A Defence of Cosmetics" was singled out for vilification as "decadent", and subsequent issues of The Yellow Book containing his work were condemned by the establishment.

Beerbohm contended that the use of make-up by women, and some men, was becoming the norm in the 1890s, and that the mask was becoming more important than the face. His essay claimed that:

"most women are not as young as they are painted... Cosmetics are not going to be a mere prosaic remedy for age or plainness, but all ladies and girls will come to love them...the season of the unsophisticated is gone by, and the young girl's final extinction beneath the rising tides of cosmetics will leave no gap in life and will rob art of nothing... Artifice, sweetest exile, is come into her kingdom." Sun-tan make-up was being used by "countless gentlemen who walk about town in the time of its desertion from August to October, artificially bronzed, as though they were fresh from the moors or the Solent. This, I conceive, is done for purely social reasons."

The essay, an ironic defence of Decadence, created a sensation when it appeared in 1894. Delighted with the essay, William Rothenstein wrote to Beerbohm, "...all my friends chuckled over your dear cosmetics as they read & reread them. Oscar, solitary exception, was moved to a torrent of tears, so strong was his emotion". To Lord Alfred Douglas, Oscar Wilde wrote: "Max on Cosmetics in the Yellow Book is wonderful: enough style for a large school, and all very precious and thought-out: quite delightfully wrong and fascinating". Wilde, appreciating Beerbohm's wise but ironic manner, commented that "The gods bestowed on Max the gift of perpetual old age".
