= A Survey =

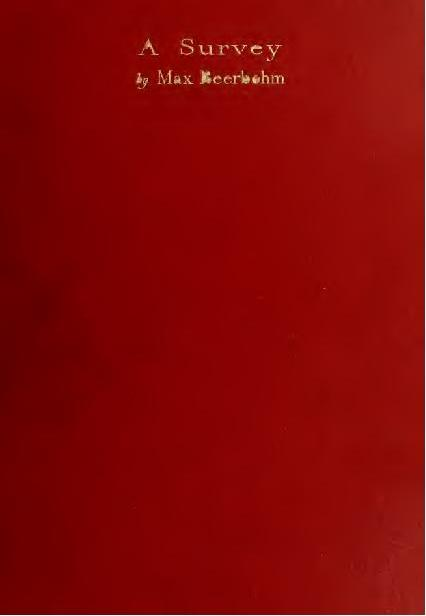
- Cover of A Survey (1921)
- Author: Max Beerbohm
- Language: English
- Publisher: William Heinemann
- Publication date: 1921
- Publication place: United States

A Survey is a book of fifty-two caricatures and humorous illustrations by British essayist, caricaturist and parodist Max Beerbohm. It was published in Britain in 1921 by William Heinemann and in the United States in the same year by Doubleday, Page & Company of New York City.

Beerbohm created the illustrations for A Survey at his home in Rapallo in Italy and in Britain, where he and his wife Florence Kahn returned for the duration of World War I. The book was a satire on that War, and was published in plum cloth covered boards with fifty-two tipped-in pictures, comprising fifty-one monochrome illustrations and one colour frontispiece. Each plate was accompanied by a guard sheet with a descriptive letterpress.

The caricatures included Joseph Conrad, the book included caricatures of David Lloyd George, Lytton Strachey, Philip Guedalla, Woodrow Wilson, Edward Gordon Craig, Edward Carson, Maurice Hewlett, Philip Sassoon, Claude Phillips, Edmund Gosse, Paderewski, Gabriele d'Annunzio, James McNeill Whistler, Stephen Gwynn, Alfonso XIII of Spain, Sir Oliver Lodge, Sir E. Ray Lankester, Lord Charles Spencer, Ralph Nevill, George Bernard Shaw, Georg Brandes, Henry James, George Robey, H. H. Asquith, Leon Trotsky, Bonar Law among other eminent men of the day and a variety of contemporary politicians.

== Gallery ==
Edward Carson

Edmund Gosse

Stephen Gwynn

Maurice Hewlett

Alfonso XIII of Spain

David Lloyd George

Lord Charles Spencer

Edward Gordon Craig
