= George Sheringham =

British artist (1884–1937)

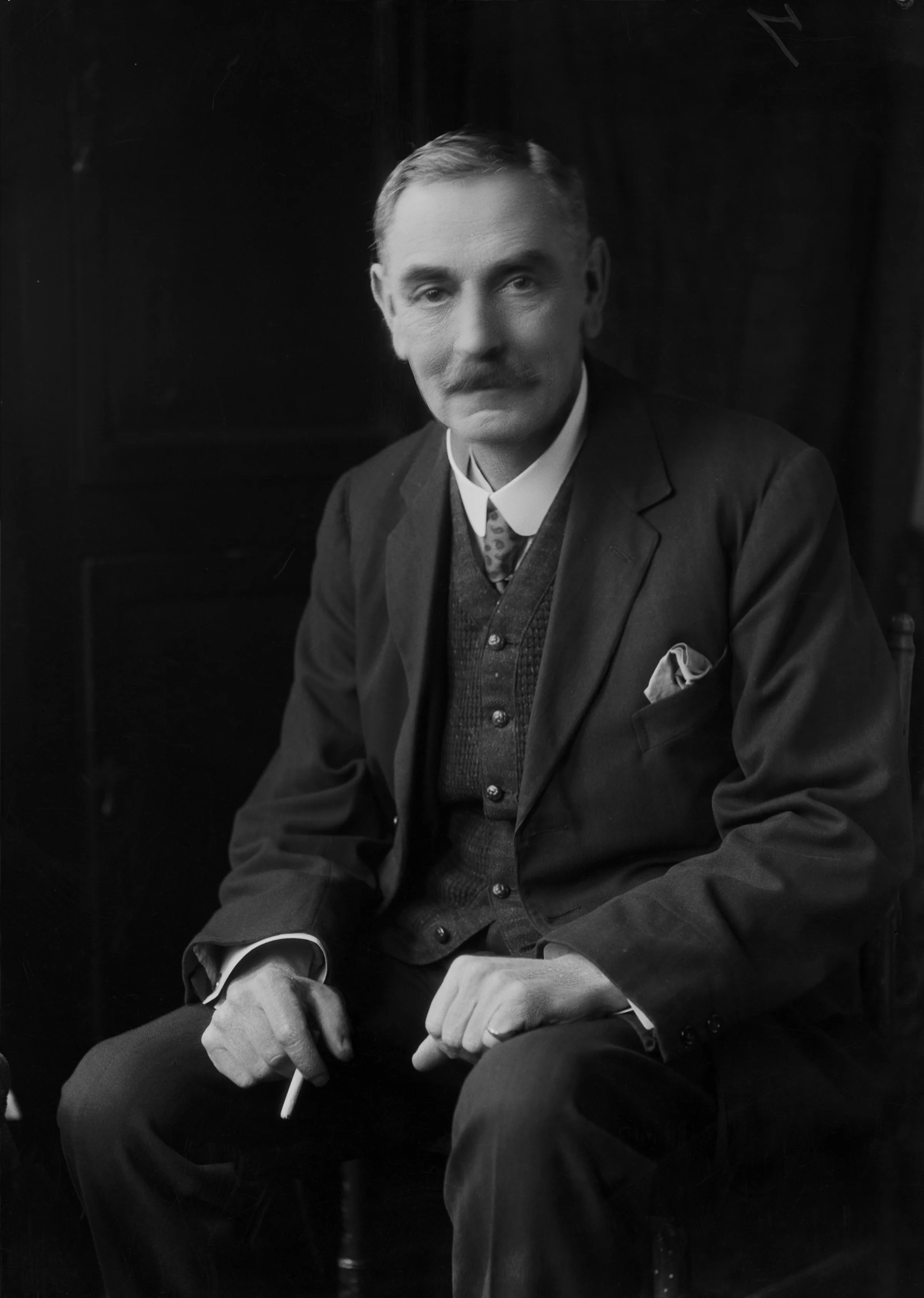
Sheringham in 1927

George Sheringham (13 November 1884 – 11 November 1937) was a British painter and theatre designer. One of the first recipients of the Royal Designers for Industry distinction in 1937, he is remembered for his work for the D’Oyly Carte Opera Company.

== Life and career ==
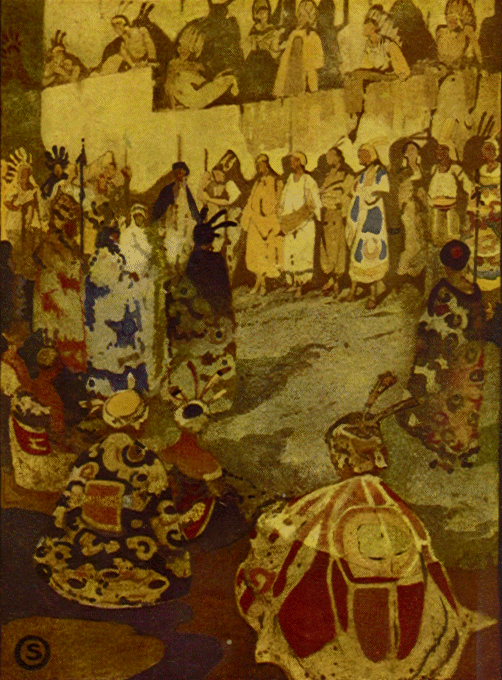
Frontispiece to Canadian Wonder Tales, 1917

Sheringham was born in London, the son of an Anglican clergyman, the Rev. Harry Alsager Sheringham, Rector of Christ Church, Marylebone, and had a brother, Hugh, who became the Angling Editor of The Field. He was educated at the King's School, Gloucester, the Slade School of Fine Art (1899–1901), and the Sorbonne, Paris (1904–1906).

=== Painter and illustrator ===
Sheringham first exhibited in Paris and later in Venice, Brussels, and Berlin. His one-man exhibitions included one in Paris in 1905, in London at the Ryder Gallery the same year, one in Melbourne, one in New York and seven more in London. He exhibited with the International Society from 1922.

Though best known as a stage designer and decorative artist, Sheringham also illustrated books by Max Beerbohm (including The Happy Hypocrite (1915)) and Edmond Rostand (La Princesse Lointaine, 1919). In 1917, he illustrated Canadian Wonder Tales by Cyrus MacMillan. In 1921, he collaborated with his brother Hugh on a book about fishing, The Book of the Fly Rod. He wrote Drawing in Pen and Pencil (1922), with James Laver, Design in the Theatre (1927). and with Rupert Mason and R. Boyd Morrison he edited Robes of Thespis, Costume Designs by Modern Artists (1928). His work was also part of the painting event in the art competition at the 1932 Summer Olympics.

=== Decorator ===
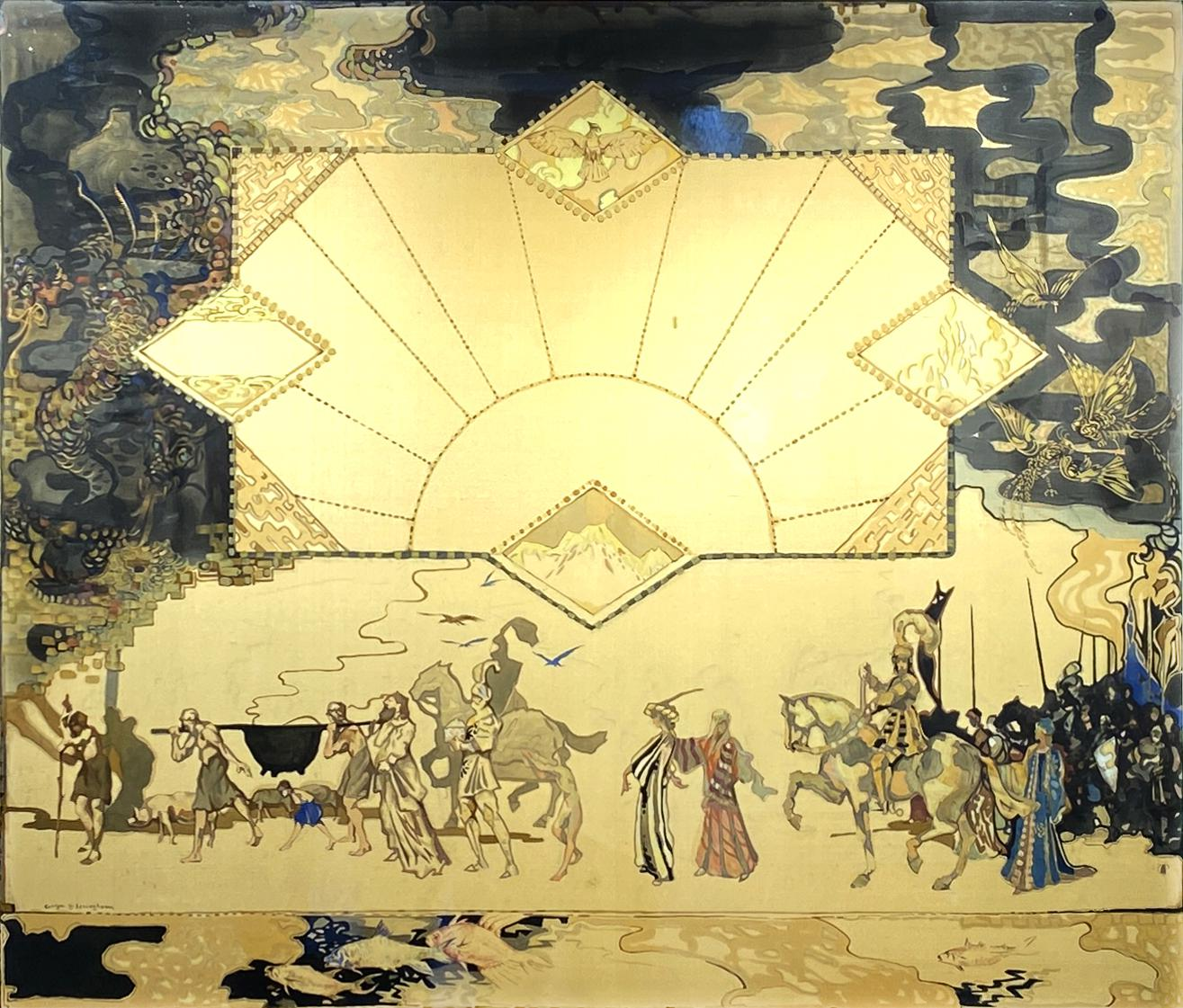
The Panel of the Mabinogi (watercolour and gouache on silk)

As a decorator, Sheringham designed the music room at 40 Devonshire House, London; a series of paintings for Seaford House, London, for the 8th Baron Howard de Walden (also Baron Seaford) to illustrate his Celtic poem, The Cauldron of Anwn; the ballroom at Claridge's Hotel; and the Paris Exhibition of 1937. He also created commercial designs used in home decorations. When, in 1936, the Royal Society of Arts established the prestigious Royal Designers for Industry distinction, Sheringham was one of its first recipients in 1937. Sheringham also became known as a designer of fans.

=== Stage designer ===
Sheringham designed scenery and costumes for ballets, opera and straight theatre including The Clandestine Marriage, The Skin Game, The Lady of the Camellias, Othello, Love in a Village, Derby Day, The Duenna, and the Stratford Memorial Theatre's opening production of Twelfth Night, and Hamlet. In the theatre he worked closely with the actor-manager Nigel Playfair.

For D’Oyly Carte, he designed new productions of H.M.S. Pinafore (1929); The Pirates of Penzance (1929); Patience (1929, with other designs contributed by Hugo Rumbold); Trial by Jury (costumes only) and Iolanthe (costumes only, 1932).

=== Last years and honours ===
Sheringham obtained a Grand Prix at the Paris Salon in 1925 for mural and theatrical design. An invalid from 1932, he continued to paint flowers.

In 1937, George Sheringham died on 11 November in his home in Hampstead, London, two days before his 53rd birthday.
