= Rossetti and His Circle =

1922 book by Max Beerbohm

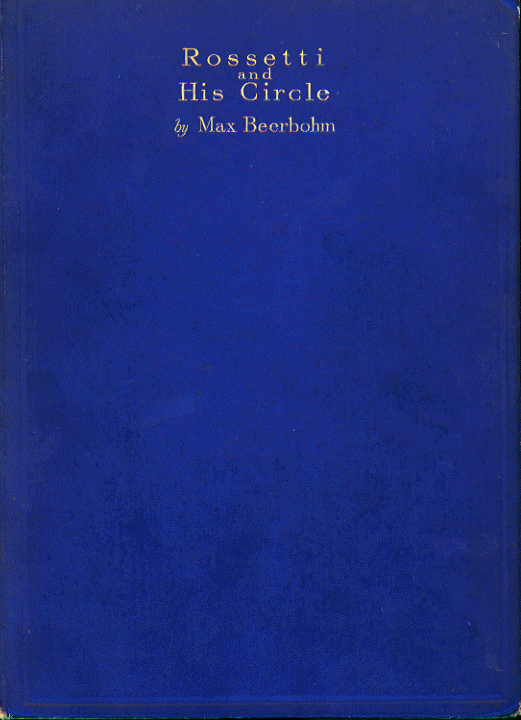
- Cover to the 1922 first edition of Rossetti and His Circle
- Author: Max Beerbohm
- Language: English
- Publisher: William Heinemann
- Publication date: 1922
- Publication place: United States

Rossetti and His Circle is a book of twenty-three caricatures by English caricaturist, essayist and parodist Max Beerbohm. Published in 1922 by William Heinemann, the drawings were Beerbohm's humorous imaginings concerning the life of Dante Gabriel Rossetti and his fellow Pre-Raphaelites, the period, as he put it, "just before oneself." The book is now considered one of Beerbohm's masterpieces.

== Beerbohm and Rossetti ==
Beerbohm returned to England from his home in Rapallo in Italy so that he could study photographs of the subjects he depicted in his caricatures. During the winter of 1917 he rented a cottage in the English countryside near the home of his friend William Rothenstein so that he could work on his Rossetti drawings. Every day, carrying his portfolio of drawings with him, Beerbohm walked across the snow to visit Rothenstein. "No wonder Max was nervous of leaving his Rossetti caricatures in an empty cottage... What a remarkable reconstruction of a period!" Rothenstein later wrote. Rossetti and the Pre-Raphaelite Brotherhood had captured Beerbohm's imagination. "In London, in the great days of a deep, smug, thick, rich, drab, industrial complacency," he wrote, "Rossetti shone, for the men and women who knew him, with the ambiguous light of a red torch somewhere in a dense fog. And so he still shines for me."

Beerbohm's caricatures include Dante Gabriel Rossetti with his sister Christina, John Ruskin, Algernon Charles Swinburne, William Holman Hunt, John Millais and George Meredith. In plate 22, Oscar Wilde, on his 1882 lecture tour in America, describes the delights of the Aesthetic Movement to a fascinated audience. This tour had been organised by Richard D'Oyly Carte to publicise the new Gilbert and Sullivan opera Patience.

Sir Hugh Walpole bequeathed Beerbohm's original watercolour artwork for Rossetti and His Circle to the Tate Collection in London in 1941.

A special limited edition of 380 numbered copies bound in white cloth was also published in 1922. These were signed by Beerbohm.

== Contents ==
- Note (Beerbohm's Introduction to the Caricatures)
- Frontispiece: Rossetti in Childhood.
- 1. British Stock and Alien Inspiration.
- 2. Rossetti's Courtship.
- 3. A Momentary Vision that once Befell Young Millais.
- 4. A Remark by Benjamin Jowett.
- 5. Coventry Patmore at Spring Cottage.
- 6. Ned Jones and Topsy.
- 7. John Ruskin meets Miss Cornforth.
- 8. Blue China.
- 9. Woolner at Farringford.
- 10. Ford Madox Brown patronised by Holman Hunt.
- 11. The Small Hours in the Sixties at 16, Cheyne Walk.
- 12. Gabriel and Christina.
- 13. George Meredith's Hortation.
- 14. William Bell Scott Wondering.
- 15. Robert Browning introduces a Great Lady.
- 16. George Augustus Sala with Rossetti.
- 17. Swinburne and Mr. Gosse.
- 18. Mr. Morley brings Mr. Mill.
- 19. Mr. Leighton suggests Candidature.
- 20. Mr. Watts, Mr. Shields, and Mr. Caine.
- 21. The Touch of a Vanished Hand.
- 22. Rossetti's Name is heard in America.

== The Plates ==
Image	Description
	Frontispiece. Rossetti in Childhood; D. G. Rossetti, precociously manifesting, among the exiled patriots who frequented his father's house in Charlotte Street, that queer indifference to politics which marked him in his prime and his decline.
	British Stock and Alien Inspiration 1849; First County Member/Holman Hunt: "Very clever no doubt" Second County Member/John Millais: "Full of wonderful ideas, but" First County Member/Holman Hunt; Second County Member/John Millais: "not to be trusted for one moment". (Benjamin Disraeli pondered by Tory MPs; Rossetti pondered by Hunt and Millais)
	Rossetti's Courtship. Chatham Place, 1850–1860
	A Momentary Vision that once Befell Young Millais
	The Sole Remark Likely to Have Been Made by Benjamin Jowett about the Mural Paintings at the Oxford Union " And what were they going to do with the Grail when they found it, Mr. Rossetti?"
	Spring Cottage, Hamstead, 1860; Coventry Patmore preaches very vehemently to the Rossettis that a tea-pot is not worshipful for its form and colour but as a sublime symbol of domesticity.
	Topsy and Ned Jones, settled on the Settle in Red Lion Square.
	An Introduction; Miss Cornforth: "Oh, very pleased to meet Mr. Ruskin, I'm sure.".
	Blue China (Whistler and Carlyle)
	Woolner at Farringford, 1857; Mrs. Tennyson: "You know, Mr. Woolner, I'm one of the most un-meddlesome of women; but – when (I'm only asking), when do you begin modelling his halo?"
	Ford Madox Brown patronised by Holman Hunt
	The Small Hours in the Sixties at 16, Cheyne Walk; Algernon Reading Anactoria to Gabriel and William
	Rossetti, having just had a fresh consignment of "stunning" fabrics from that new shop in Regent Street, tries hard to prevail on his younger sister to accept at any rate one of these and have a dress made of it from designs to be furnished by himself. D. G. R. "What is the use, Christina, of having a heart like a singing bird and a water-shoot and all the rest of it, if you insist on getting yourself up like a pew-opener? " C. R. "Well, Gabriel, I don't know I'm sure you yourself always dress very quietly."
	George Meredith's Hortation; Rossetti insistently exhorted by George Meredith to come forth into the glorious sun and wind for a walk to Hendon and beyond
	Mr. William Bell Scott wondering what it is those fellows seem to see in Gabriel
	Mr. Browning brings a lady of rank and fashion to see Mr. Rossetti.
	Rossetti in his worldlier days (circa 1866–1868) leaving the Arundel Club with George Augustus Sala; Mr. Sala: "You and I, Rossetti, we like and we understand each other. Bohemians, both of us, to the core, we take the world as we find it. I give Mr. Levy what he wants, and you give Mr. Rae and Mr. Leyland what they want, and glad we are to pocket the cash and foregather at the Arundel."
	Riverside Scene; Algernon Charles Swinburne taking his great new friend Gosse to see Gabriel Rossetti.
	Mr. Morley of Blackburn, on an afternoon in the spring of 69, introduces Mr John Stuart Mill "It has recently," he says, "occurred to Mr. Mill that in his lifelong endeavour to catch and keep the ear of the nation he has been hampered by a certain deficiency in well, in warmth, in colour, in rich charm. I have told him that this deficiency (I do not regard it as a defect) might possibly be remedied by you. Mr. Mill has in the press at this moment a new work, entitled 'The Subjection of Women.' From my slight acquaintance with you, and from all that I have seen and heard of your work, I gather that women greatly interest you, and I have no doubt that you are incensed at their subjection. Mr. Mill has brought his proof-sheets with him. He will read them to you. I believe, and he takes my word for it, that a series of illustrative paintings by you would" etc., etc.
	The Man from Hymettus Mr. Frederic Leighton : "Think not for one moment, my dear Mr. Rossetti, that I am insensible to the charm of a life recluded, as yours is, from the dust of the arena, from the mire of the market-place. Ah no! I envy you your ivory tower. How often at some Council Meeting of the R.A. have I murmured within me that phrase of Wordsworth's, 'The world is too much with us'! But alas, in all of us there is a duality of nature. You, O felix nimium, are poet as well as painter. I, separated from my easel, am but a citizen. And the civistic passion yes, passion, dear Mr. Rossetti- restrains the instinct of the artist in me towards solitude, and curbs the panting of the hart in me for the water-brooks. I feel that I have, in conjunction with my colleagues, a duty to the nation. To improve the taste of the Sovereign, the taste of her ever-genial first-born and of his sweet and gracious consort, of the Lords Spiritual and Temporal of the faithful Commons, of the Judicial Bench, of those who direct the Army and Navy and Reserve Forces, of our merchant princes in Threadneedle Street and of our squires in the Shires, and through all these to bring light and improvement to those toiling millions on whom ultimately the glory of Great Britain rests all this is in me an ambition not to be stifled and an aspiration not to be foregone. You smile, Mr. Rossetti, yet I am not disemboldened to say to you now, as I have often wished to say to you, in the words of the Apostle Paul, 'Come over and help us!' Our President I grant you in confidence is not of all men the most enlightened. But I, in virtue of what is left to me of youth and ardour, conjoined with the paltry gift of tact, have some little influence at Burlington House. Come now! let me put your name down in our Candidates' Book."
	Quis Custodiet Ipsum Custodem? Theodore Watts: "Mr. Caine, a word with you ! Shields and I have been talking matters over, and we are agreed that tonight and henceforth you must not and shall not read any more of your literary efforts to our friend. They are too what shall I say? too luridly arresting, and are the allies of insomnia."
	Mr. ___ and Miss ___ nervously perpetuating the touch of a vanished hand. (Charles Augustus Howell and Rosa Corder).
	The Name of Dante Gabriel Rossetti is Heard for the First Time in the Western States of America. Time: 1882. Lecturer: Mr. Oscar Wilde.

== See also ==
- Caricatures of Twenty-five Gentlemen (1896)
- The Poets' Corner (1904)
- Fifty Caricatures (1913)
- List of paintings by Dante Gabriel Rossetti
