= Going Out for a Walk =

Essay by Max Beerbohm

"Going Out for a Walk", is an essay by Max Beerbohm, written in 1918 and published in 1920 in the essay collection And Even Now. The essay challenges the idea that taking a walk is solely a matter of the brain needing release, and it becomes more conflicted when there is a talkative companion.

== Summary ==
The main theme of the essay is the challenge of the common notion that taking a walk is a productive activity useful for the brain. Beerbohm, on the contrary, makes the case that taking a walk prevents the mind from intelligent thought. Beerbohm's reasoning is that while walking, you almost lose a part of your train of thought, as you are unconsciously thinking about walking. Beerbohm notes that in London the loud noises of the city save him from needing to make up excuses when someone asks him out for a walk, but the solace of the country can cause a "walk monger" to insist on talking a walk.

Not having an excuse to not take a walk causes Beerbohm to be taken from the comfort of a reading chair, which is a disruption that he finds unproductive. He claims that even the most intelligent writers lose their train of thought as soon as they start walking, and conversations eventually lead to dull topics and gossip. Beerbohm concludes the essay by claiming that he does not believe that physical exercise is bad for you ("taken moderately, it is rather good for one, physically"), but condemns taking walks that lack reason, and expresses his preference for other forms of transportation.
