= Mark Samuels Lasner =

Mark Samuels Lasner (born 1952) is an American researcher. He is an authority on the literature and art of the late Victorian era. He is also a collector, bibliographer and typographer. Samuels Lasner is senior research fellow at the University of Delaware Library.

== Mark Samuels Lasner Collection ==
A graduate of Connecticut College, Samuels Lasner has served as an honorary curator at several institutions and is active in numerous bibliophile and scholarly organizations. His life's work has, however, been the amassing of what Samuels Lasner calls "A Period Library", one of the country's foremost private collections of books, manuscripts, letters, and artworks by British cultural figures who flourished between 1850 and 1900. His collection comprises 2,500 first and other editions, including many signed and association copies, manuscripts, letters, works on paper, and ephemera.

The materials in his collection, particularly those relating to Aubrey Beardsley, Max Beerbohm, Oscar Wilde, and other writers and artists of the 1890s, have provided the basis for numerous publications and exhibitions. Samuels Lasner is senior research fellow at the Library of the University of Delaware, which now houses the larger portion of his collection.

== Publications ==
Samuels Lasner is the author of The Bookplates of Aubrey Beardsley (Rivendale Press, 2008), A Bibliography of Enoch Soames (Rivendale Press, 1999), The Yellow Book: A Checklist and Index (Eighteen Nineties Society, 1998), A Selective Checklist of the Published Work of Aubrey Beardsley (Thomas G. Boss Fine Books, 1995), and William Allingham: A Bibliographical Study (Holmes Publishing Co., 1993); he has co-authored books such as England in the 1880s: Old Guard and Avant-Garde (University of Virginia Press, 1989) and England in the 1890s: Literary Publishing at the Bodley Head (Georgetown University Press, 1990).

His articles and notes have appeared in The Book Collector, Browning Institute Studies, Notes and Queries, and other journals. He has organized or co-curated exhibitions held at the University of Virginia Library; Georgetown University Library; the Houghton Library and the Fogg Museum, Harvard University; Bryn Mawr College Library and the Grolier Club.

== Awards ==
Samuels Lasner was the 2003 recipient of the Sir Thomas More medal from the University of San Francisco, which was awarded to honor the spirit of "private collecting, a public benefit." In 2009 The American Printing History Association (APHA) announced a fellowship award, the Mark Samuels Lasner Fellowship in Printing History for the study of printing history. An award of up to $2,000 is available for research in any area of the history of printing in any form, including all the arts and technologies relevant to printing, the book arts, and letter forms.
