= Eva Gabriele Reichmann =

German historian and sociologist

Eva Gabriele Reichmann (16 January 1897 – 15 September 1998) was an eminent German historian and sociologist. From 1945 on she conducted research on anti-Semitism. Reichmann was Jewish.

== Life ==
Eva Gabriele Reichmann (née Jungmann) was born in Lublinitz (Upper-Silesia) the daughter of Adolf and Agnes Jungmann. She was married to the lawyer Hans Reichmann. Between 1924 and 1939 both worked for the Centralverein deutscher Staatsbürger jüdischen Glaubens, one of the most important organisations focused on the protection of Judaism in Germany. In 1938, in the course of the Novemberpogrome her husband was imprisoned in the Sachsenhausen concentration camp. After that the couple emigrated to London in 1939.

In London she worked as a translator for BBC's tapping service. In 1945 she earned her second doctorate at the London School of Economics by the work Hostages of Civilization: A Study of the Social Causes of Anti-Semitism in Germany. Therein she analysed the downfall of Germany's Jewish communities and described the specific national socialistic anti-Semitism as an extreme example of a common xenophobia against religious-ethnic minorities and as a compensation of a deep-rooted uncertainty of the German patriotism. Although this explanatory approach of the Holocaust is well differentiated nowadays and is not supported any more, her work did encourage further research on that topic substantially.

As one of the first German speaking historians and persecuted Jews she collected and archived reports of persecuted Jewish people and was an eyewitnesses for the Wiener Library's research department. As its director she evaluated the minutes of the Nuremberg Trials. At the same time she strongly engaged in the reconciliation of the survivors of the Holocaust and expelled German Jews with the Federal Republic of Germany. For this she was awarded the Moses Mendelssohn-Prize in 1982 and the Great Cross of Merit of Germany in the following year. Later she received the Buber-Rosenzweig-Medal. She died in London.

Reichmann is deemed to be an outstanding scientist, who, as an affected contemporary witness, began research on the development of the Holocaust directly after the end of the war and thereby contributed importantly to clarification and reconciliation.

Her sister was Elisabeth Jungmann, the secretary and second wife of caricaturist and parodist Max Beerbohm.

== Works ==
- Größe und Verhängnis deutsch-jüdischer Existenz. Zeugnisse einer tragischen Begegnung. Mit einem Geleitwort von Helmut Gollwitzer. Lambert Schneider, Heidelberg 1974
- Hostages of Civilisation. A Study of the Social Causes of Antisemitism. Association of Jewish Refugees Information, April 1945
- German: Die Flucht in den Hass. Die Ursachen der deutschen Judenkatastrophe. Frankfurt am Main 1951
- Editor: Worte des Gedenkens für Leo Baeck. Lambert Schneider, Heidelberg 1959

== See also ==
- Hannah Arendt
