= Caricatures of Twenty-five Gentlemen =

1896 book

- The Cover of the first edition of Caricatures of Twenty-five Gentlemen (1896))
- Author: Max Beerbohm
- Language: English
- Publisher: Leonard Smithers and Co
- Publication date: 1896
- Publication place: United States

Caricatures of Twenty-five Gentlemen is a book of twenty-five caricatures by English caricaturist, essayist and parodist Max Beerbohm. It was published in 1896 by Leonard Smithers and Co and was Beerbohm's first book of caricatures.

Published with an introduction by Leonard Raven-Hill, Caricatures of Twenty-five Gentlemen appeared the same year as Beerbohm's first collection of essays, The Works of Max Beerbohm. Caricatures of Twenty-five Gentlemen includes portraits of many prominent writers and artists of the 1890s, including Richard Le Gallienne, Frank Harris, Rudyard Kipling, Aubrey Beardsley and George Bernard Shaw.

The collection established Beerbohm's reputation as the cruelest caricaturist of his day. Beerbohm was aged 24 when the book was published.

== Gallery ==
Aubrey Beardsley

Aubrey Beardsley

== See also ==
- The Poets' Corner (1904)
- Fifty Caricatures (1913)
- Rossetti and His Circle (1922)
