= Mainly on the Air =

1946 essay collection by Max Beerbohm

Cover of the first British edition of Mainly on the Air (1946)

Mainly on the Air is a collection of texts and essays written by English caricaturist, essayist and parodist Max Beerbohm. It was published in 1946 by Heinemann and is a collection of the texts of a series of six BBC Radio broadcasts from 1935 to 1945 and six essays.

== Background ==
Beerbohm returned to England from his home in Rapallo in Italy in about 1935 when his wife, Florence Kahn was cast in a revival of Peer Gynt on the London stage. At this time he resumed writing essays when the BBC invited him to give regular radio broadcasts. He talked about cars and carriages and music halls, among other topics. He and his wife remained in Britain during World War II during which period Beerbohm continued to broadcast, giving his last 'on air' talk in 1945.

The success of these broadcasts made Beerbohm a well-known emeritus of British humour. Six of these radio talks were collected together with six other essays and published as Mainly on the Air in 1946.

The book was first published in America in 1947 by Alfred A. Knopf of New York. It ran into 17 editions between 1946 and 1972 in English and other languages. An enlarged edition was published by Heinemann in 1957.

== Contents ==
Cover of the first American edition of Mainly on the Air (1947)

=== Broadcasts ===
- London revisited (1935)
- Speed (1936)
- A small boy seeing giants (1936)
- Music Halls of my youth (1942)
- Advertisements (1942)
- Playgoing (1945)

=== Other Things ===
- A note on the Einstein Theory (1923)
- From Bloomsbury to Bayswater (1940)
- Old Carthusian Memoirs (1920)
- The Top Hat (1940)
- Fenestralia (1944)
- T. Fenning Dodworth (1922)

== See also ==
- The Works of Max Beerbohm (1896)
