= Rudolf G. Binding =

German writer and poet (1867–1938)

Rudolf Binding
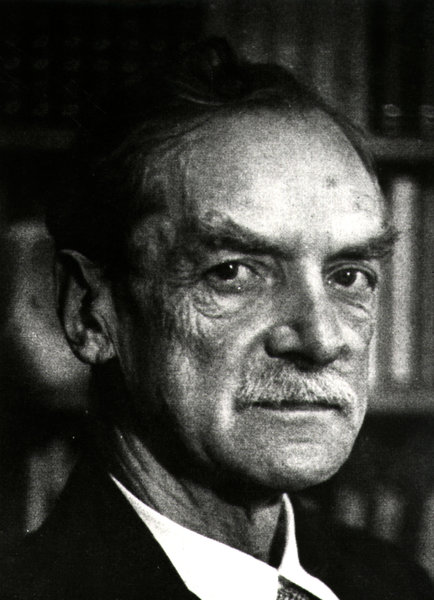
- Born: 13 August 1867; Basel, Switzerland
- Died: 4 August 1938 (aged 70); Starnberg, German Reich
- Writing career
- Notable work: A Fatalist at War

Rudolf Georg Binding (13 August 1867 – 4 August 1938) was a German writer. During World War I, he served as a cavalry master and staff officer. He was primarily known for his diary which he wrote during his time in the war.

== Life ==
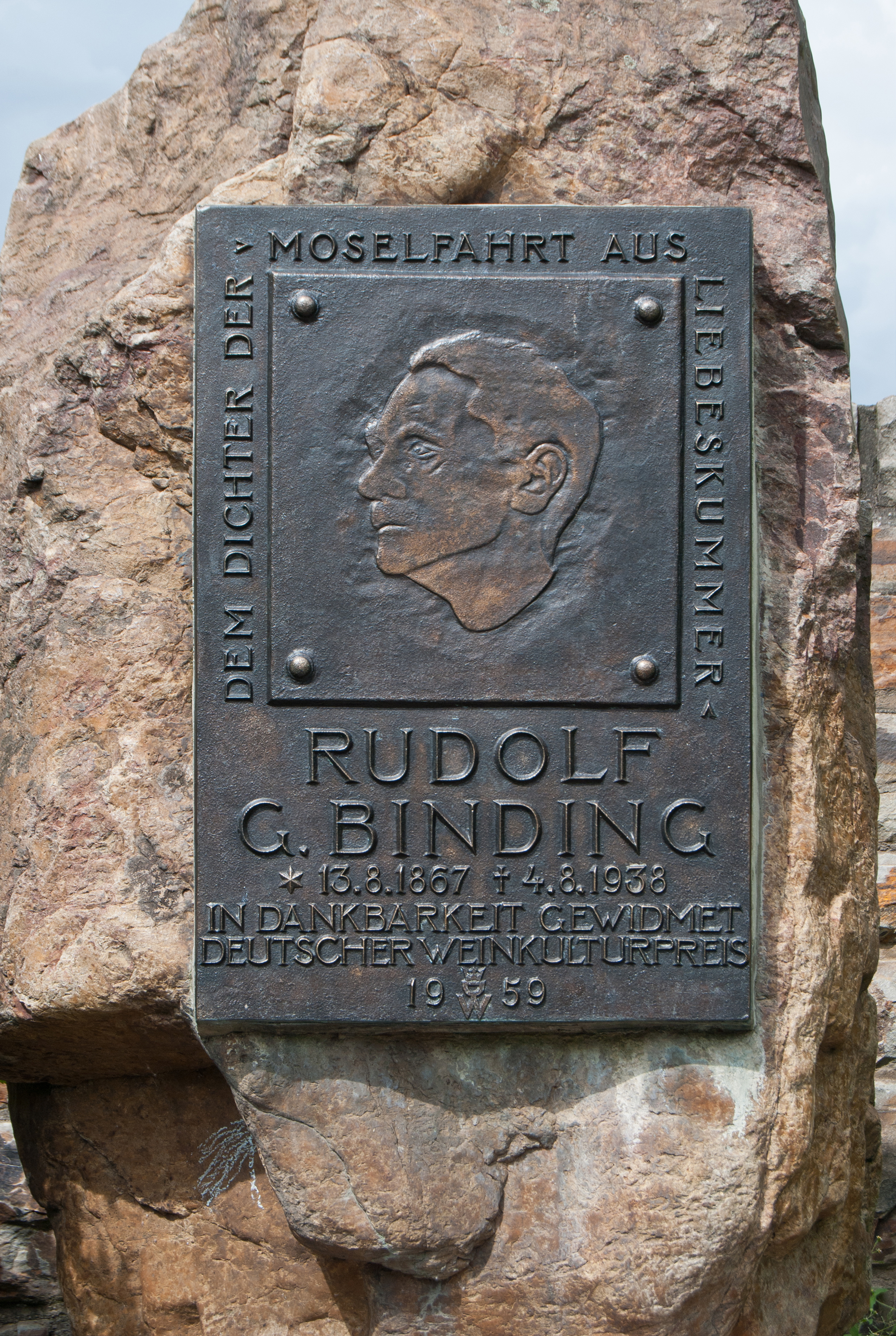
Plaque at a Rudolf G. Binding memorial in Traben-Trarbach

Binfing was born in Basel, Switzerland, and died in Starnberg. He studied medicine and law before joining the Hussars. On the outbreak of the First World War, Binding, a forty-six years old, became commander of a squadron of dragoons. Except for a four-month period in Galicia in 1916, Binding spent the war on the Western Front.

Binding's diary and letters, A Fatalist at War, was published in 1927. His collected war poems, stories and recollections were not published until after his death in 1938.

Binding was never a member of the National Socialist Party and publicly dissociated himself from one of its actions; but his relationship to it was ambiguous, for he saw it at times as an aspect of national revival.

In 1928 he won a silver medal in the art competitions of the Olympic Games for his "Reitvorschrift für eine Geliebte" (Rider's Instructions to his Lover).

From 1933 his private secretary and English interpreter was Elisabeth Jungmann a Jewish German. Binding had hoped to marry Jungmann but was prevented from doing so by the Nuremberg Laws. She became the second wife of Sir Max Beerbohm in 1956.

In October 1933 Binding signed the Gelöbnis treuester Gefolgschaft declaring loyalty and support to Adolf Hitler.

He was on friendly terms with the English writer A.P. Herbert, to whom he was introduced by Wilhelmine Arnold-Baker. They found that they had been within yards of each other in opposite trenches during the war.

Olympic medal record

Art competitions
Silver medal – second place	1928 Amsterdam	Lyric works

== Publications ==
=== By Rudolf Binding ===
- Aus dem Kriege. Rütten & Loening, Frankfurt-am-Main 1925; translated into English as A Fatalist at War, Ian F. D. Morrow, tr., Allen & Unwin, London 1929 and Houghton Mifflin Company, Boston and New York 1929
- Das grosse Rudolf-G.-Binding-Buch. Eine Auswahl aus dem Werk. Bertelsmann, München 1979 ISBN 3-570-05173-0
- Der Opfergang. Eine Novelle. (53. edition, Insel, Frankfurt am Main 1993 ISBN 3-458-08023-6)

=== About Rudolf Binding ===
- Traude Stenner: Rudolf G. Binding. Leben und Werk. Potsdam: Rütten & Loening. 1938.
- Anton Mayer: Der Göttergleiche. Erinnerungen an Rudolf G. Binding. Potsdam: Rütten & Loening. 1939.
- Heinz Millotat: Rudolf G. Bindings erzählerisches Werk. Würzburg-Aumühle: Triltsch. 1939.
- Roger L. Cole: The Ethical Foundations of Rudolf Binding's 'Gentleman'-Concept. The Hague and others: Mouton. 1966. (= Studies in German literature; 7)
- Bernhard Martin: Dichtung und Ideologie. Völkisch-nationales Denken im Werk Rudolf Georg Bindings. Frankfurt am Main and others: Peter Lang. 1986. (= Europäische Hochschulschriften; Reihe 1; Deutsche Sprache und Literatur; 950) ISBN 3-8204-9532-0
- Reitvorschrift für eine Geliebte (New edition: Olms, Hildesheim and others, 1995 ISBN 3-487-08369-8)
- Kirstin M. Howard: The concept of honour in the context of the World War One. Accounts of Walter Flex, Rudolf G. Binding and Ernst Jünger. Dunedin, New Zealand: Univ. of Otago, Dissertation, 1996.
