= Campbell Dixon =

Australian-British playwright and journalist

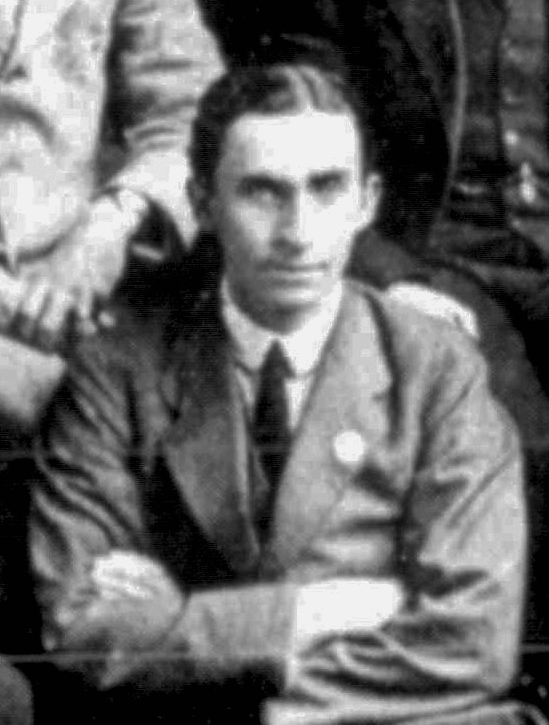
Campbell Dixon in 1920

George William Campbell Dixon (10 December 1895, Ouse, Tasmania – 25 May 1960, London) was an Australian and British journalist, publicist and playwright. He was an employee of the Hobart newspaper The Mercury, Melbourne's The Argus and The Herald, and London's Daily Mail; from 1931 until his death, he headed the film criticism division of The Daily Telegraph. In 1950, he served as president of the Critics' Circle.

Dixon's plays formed the basis for the scripts of the films Isle of Escape (1930), directed by Howard Bretherton; Secret Agent (1936), directed by Alfred Hitchcock; and, according to one version, the film Freedom Radio (1941) by Anthony Asquith.

== Bibliography ==
- Dixon, Campbell (April 1960). "All criticism is prejudiced". Films & Filming Incorporating Focus on Film (6) (Films and Filming ed.): 15, 28. ISSN 0015-167X.
- Dixon, G. Campbell (1947). "A film critic reviews a producer". Michael Balcon's 25 Years in Films. London: World Film Publications. pp. 37–41.
- Wearing, John Peter (2014). The London Stage 1930–1939 (2nd ed.). Lanham, MA: Rowman & Littlefield. ISBN 978-0-8108-9304-7.
