= Jack McLaren =

Australian novelist

- Born: John McLaren; 13 October 1884; Fitzroy, Victoria, Australia
- Died: 16 May 1954 (aged 69); Brighton, Sussex, England
- Resting place: Brighton, Sussex, England
- Occupation: writer
- Writing career
- Pen name: Top McNorth
- Language: English

Jack McLaren (13 October 1884 – 16 May 1954) was an Australian novelist who wrote novels based on his life experiences and who was renowned for his "authenticity of background".

== Life and work ==
Jack McLaren was the eldest son of Rev. John McLaren, Presbyterian minister, and his wife Mary. McLaren's father was on his way to the South Seas as a missionary and his son was born near the end of the voyage. McLaren was educated at Scotch College, Melbourne, but ran away from school at the age of 16. He worked as a cabin boy and seaman before landing in North Queensland in 1902, and for the next ten years worked a variety of jobs and travelled to Fiji, Java, New Guinea, Malaya and the Solomon Islands.

In 1911 he settled at Simpson's Bay on the west coast of Cape York and began to write short pieces for The Bulletin. He finished his first novel there in 1919 and then moved to Sydney with the intention of earning a living as a writer. By 1922 he had been described as one of Australia's most popular authors. By 1924 he was living in Northcote, Melbourne where he married fellow novelist, Ada Elizabeth Moore, née McKenzie. The couple moved to London in 1925 where McLaren continued his writing life, which included the publication of four autobiographical books in the 1920s and 30s. He broadcast and wrote scripts for the British Broadcasting Corporation and during World War II was in charge of the section of the Ministry of Information responsible for publicity about the Empire.

His first wife died in 1946, and on 21 February 1951, he married Dorothy Norris of Chelsea.

Jack McLaren died of myocardial infarction on 16 May 1954, while on holiday in Brighton.

== My Crowded Solitude ==
McLaren's literary standing is primarily anchored in his autobiographical work, My Crowded Solitude. Written in 1926, it describes a period of eight years from 1911 on Cape York, where McLaren set up a coconut plantation. It records the native wildlife as well as McLaren's interactions with a tribe of nomadic Indigenous Australians. McLaren's clearing the land and introducing the coconuts occasioned concern in the local Aboriginal people, causing McLaren to feel 'immoral'. My Crowded Solitude may have been influenced by Henry David Thoreau's Walden.

== Bibliography ==
=== Novels ===
- The Skipper of the Roaring Meg (1919)
- The White Witch (1919)
- Red Mountain: A Romance of Tropical Australia (1919)
- The Savagery of Margaret Nestor: A Tale of Northern Queensland (1920)
- On the Fringe of the Law (1920)
- The Oil Seekers: The Tale of New Guinea Beach (1921)
- Feathers of Heaven (1921)
- Fagaloa's Daughter (1923)
- Spear-Eye (1925)
- The Hidden Lagoon (1926)
- Isle of Escape: A Story of the South Seas (1926)
- The Chain (1927)
- Sun Man (1928)
- A Diver Went Down (1929)
- The Money Stones (1933)
- The Devil of the Depths: a strange story of the South Seas (1935)
- The Crystal Skull (1936)
- Their Isle of Desire (1941)
- The Marriage of Sandra: a romance with a tropical setting (1946)
- Deep Down (1947)
- New Love for Old (1948)

=== Collections ===
- Songs of a Fuzzy-Top: Being, Mainly, the Love Story of a South Sea Islander, Told in His Own Peculiar English (1926) - poetry
- The Money Stones (1933) - short stories
- Stories of the South Seas (1946) - short stories
- Stories of Fear (1946) - contains three short stories and a radio play

=== Drama ===
- The Romantic Reef: Radioscript of Great Barrier Reef (1947)

=== Autobiography ===
- My Odyssey (1923)
- My Crowded Solitude (1926)
- Blood on the Deck: The True Record of the Author's Strange Experiences in a Deep-Sea Sailing-Ship (1933)
- My Civilised Adventure (1952)

=== Film adaptations ===
- Isle of Escape (1930). Directed by Howard Bretherton, and featured Monte Blue and Myrna Loy.
