= Fifty Caricatures =

1913 book

- Cover of Fifty Caricatures (1913)
- Author: Max Beerbohm
- Language: English
- Publisher: William Heinemann
- Publication date: 1913
- Publication place: United States

Fifty Caricatures is a book of fifty caricatures by English caricaturist, essayist and parodist Max Beerbohm. It was published in 1913 by William Heinemann in Britain and E.P. Dutton & Company in the United States. It was Beerbohm's fifth book of caricatures, after Caricatures of Twenty-five Gentlemen (1896), The Poets' Corner (1904), A Book of Caricatures (1907), and Cartoons: The Second Childhood of John Bull (1911).

Published in 1913, Beerbohm's illustrations include caricatures of Arthur Balfour, George Bernard Shaw, Lloyd George, Joseph Pennell, Lord Rosebery, John Masefield, George Grossmith, Jr., H. B. Irving, Auguste Rodin, Thomas Hardy, Bonar Law and Enrico Caruso and a collection of politicians of the time. The fifty caricatures appear on the rectos only, numbers 1 to 48 being executed in half-tone and mounted on brown paper, while numbers 49 to 50 are line drawings on white paper. The cover drawing of a corpulent be-laurelled man in profile was intended by Beerbohm to "typify triumphant mediocrity," but soon for critics became a symbol for Beerbohm himself, his top-hat here at his side rather than perched jauntily on his head.

== Gallery ==
Title page of Fifty Caricatures

George Bernard Shaw and Max Beerbohm

Mr Balfour - A Frieze

Signor Caruso

Lord Chesterfield

Some Ministers of the Crown

== See also ==
- Caricatures of Twenty-five Gentlemen (1896)
- The Poets' Corner (1904)
- Rossetti and His Circle (1922)
