= A Christmas Garland =

1912 Max Beerbohm parody set

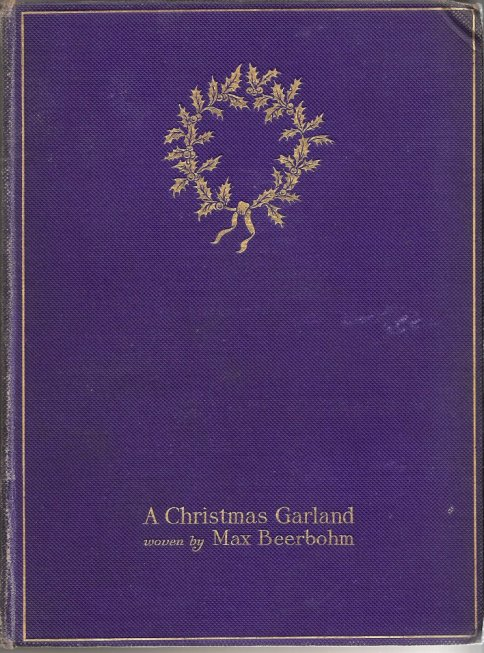
Cover of the first edition of A Christmas Garland (1912)

A Christmas Garland, Woven by Max Beerbohm is a collection of seventeen parodies written by English caricaturist, essayist and parodist Max Beerbohm. It was first published in the United Kingdom in October 1912 by Heinemann and in 1913 in the United States by Dutton & Co. of New York.

Beerbohm had a gift for parody, and A Christmas Garland is perhaps the best collection of parodies ever written in English. In his book Beerbohm parodied the style of popular writers of his day. These were Henry James, George Bernard Shaw, Thomas Hardy, Joseph Conrad, Rudyard Kipling, H. G. Wells, George Meredith, John Galsworthy, G. K. Chesterton, George Moore, Edmund Gosse, Maurice Hewlett, Hilaire Belloc, G. S. Street, Arnold Bennett, Frank Harris, and A. C. Benson. Beerbohm's parodies of their work are intermixed with a Christmas theme and the inventiveness of his own comic talents.

When A Christmas Garland first appeared in 1912 reviewers agreed that Beerbohm had not only captured the styles or "externals" of his subjects but had "unbared their brains and hearts". He seemed to have obtained "temporary loans of their very minds", from which he "worked outwards to the perfect jest." Henry James, the first author parodied, read A Christmas Garland with "wonder and delight" and called the book "the most intelligent that has been produced in England for many a long day."

"A Christmas Garland is surely the liber aureus of prose parody", said John Updike. "What makes Max, as a parodist, incomparable – more than the calm mounting from felicity to felicity and the perfectly scaled enlargement of every surface quirk of the subject style – is the way he seizes and embraces, with something like love, the total personality of the parodee. He seems to enclose in a transparent omniscience the genius of each star as, in A Christmas Garland, he methodically moves across the firmament of Edwardian letters."
