= The Happy Hypocrite =

1896 short story by Max Beerbohm

The Happy Hypocrite: A Fairy Tale for Tired Men
- Cover of 2012 reissue by Michael Walmer of illustrated 1918 edition
- Author: Max Beerbohm
- Language: English
- Genre: short story
- Publication date: 1897
- Publication place: United States

The Happy Hypocrite: A Fairy Tale for Tired Men is a short story with moral implications, first published in a separate volume by Max Beerbohm in 1897. His earliest short story, "The Happy Hypocrite" first appeared in Volume XI of The Yellow Book in October, 1896. Beerbohm's tale is a lighter, more humorous version of Oscar Wilde's 1890 classic tale of moral degeneration, The Picture of Dorian Gray.

The Happy Hypocrite tells the story of a man who deceives a woman with a mask in order to marry her. The book was published by John Lane at The Bodley Head, in New York City and in London in 1897. In 1900 the story was produced as a stage show at the Royalty Theatre in London starring Frank Mills and Mrs Patrick Campbell. In 1936 the play, with a new script by Clemence Dane and music by Richard Addinsell, was revived at His Majesty's Theatre starring Ivor Novello, Vivien Leigh, Isabel Jeans and Marius Goring.

An edition with colour illustrations by George Sheringham was published by John Lane in November 1918.

The story was adapted as a ballet with music by Herbert Elwell which premiered in 1931 in New York by Charles Weidman and the Dance Repertory Theatre, remaining in their repertory, and as a one-act radio opera, Lord Inferno, by Giorgio Federico Ghedini to a libretto by Franco Antonicelli; it premiered on RAI on 22 October 1952. It was staged as L'ipocrita felice at the Piccola Scala in Milan on 10 March 1956.

== Plot summary ==
The protagonist is named Lord George Hell. A worldly man, he is a dandy, fond of gambling, drinking, womanising, and the like. He is enjoying lavish outdoor entertainment in London with his lover, La Gambogi, when a young and innocent dancer named Jenny Mere performs on the stage. A dwarf sitting with Lord George, revealed to be Cupid, shoots his arrow into Lord George's breast.

Lord George boldly proposes marriage to Jenny, but she says that she will only marry a man with the face of a saint. Confused, Lord George spends the night wandering the streets, heartbroken. In the morning, he stumbles upon a mask maker shop of a man named Mr. Aeneas. He purchases a saint's face mask, custom altered to bear the mark of true love. La Gambogi, who sees him leave the shop with his new false face, confronts him, but he pretends not to know her and retreats to Kensington, intending to return to London that evening to see Jenny perform again. However, while viewing his new look in the reflection of a brook, he sees Jenny, leaps across the brook and proposes marriage. Jenny accepts.

Starting with signing the marriage register as "George Heaven", Lord George makes a total moral conversion by returning ill-gotten wealth to gamblers he had cheated to the rightful owners, donating excess money to charities. He then buys a woodman's cottage to live a quiet, modest existence. The newlyweds lead a simple life subsisting on "bread and honey and little strawberries ... seed-cake and dewberry wine".

One month after the marriage, as the happy couple is celebrating the occasion, La Gambogi shows up and refuses to leave until she is granted one last look at Lord George's true face. A scuffle between the three people results in La Gambogi tearing off George's mask. Although he fears that his true love is lost, it turns out that his face has assumed the contours of the mask. Jenny concludes with ecstasy that he was testing her fidelity for a time before revealing his true beautiful face.

La Gambogi leaves the couple happily kissing as the mask melts in the sun.

== See also ==
- Adaptations of The Picture of Dorian Gray
