= N. John Hall =

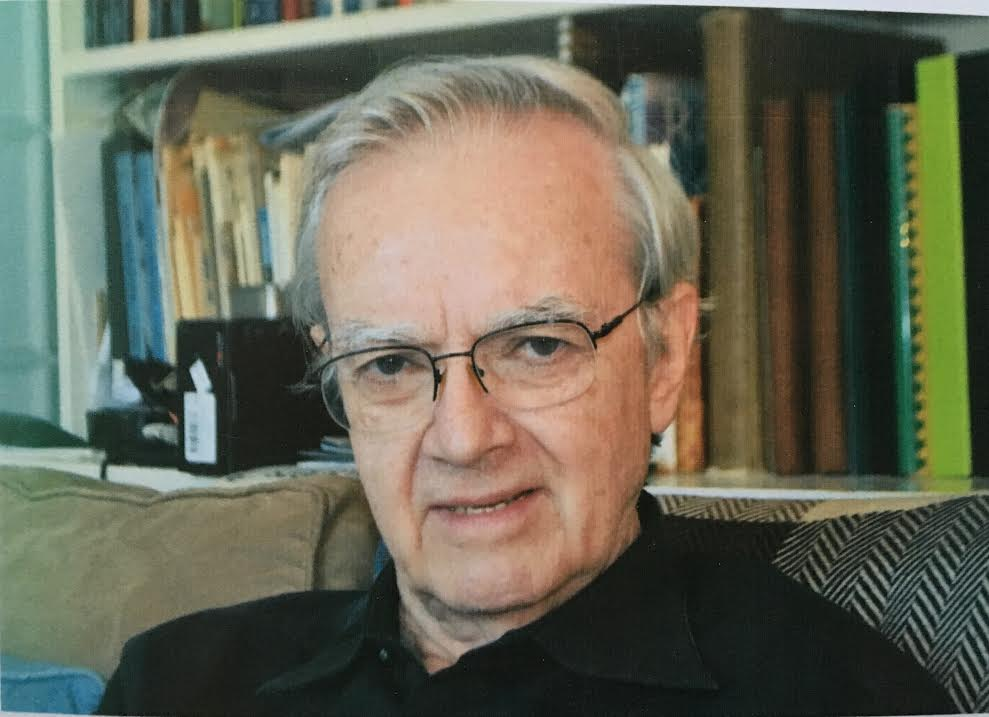
N. John Hall at his home

N. John Hall (born 1933) is an American biographer and scholar best known for his books on Anthony Trollope and Max Beerbohm. In addition, Hall has published many articles, editions, introductions, and book chapters on both Trollope and Beerbohm. In his later career, Hall has written a memoir and two novels.

== Education ==
Hall graduated with a B.A. and M.A. from Seton Hall (1955 and 1967), and a Ph.D. from New York University (1970).

== Career ==
Hall was a professor of English at Bronx Community College of the City University of New York (1970–2010) and at the CUNY Graduate Center (1980–2010). In 1983, CUNY named him Distinguished Professor; upon retirement in 2011, he became CUNY Distinguished Professor Emeritus.

Hall has received numerous scholarly awards including fellowships from the National Endowment for the Humanities; the American Council of Learned Societies; and, from the Guggenheim Foundation in 1976 and 1984.

Hall started his scholarly career with several books on Anthony Trollope. This interest began in graduate school where his dissertation was an annotated edition of a never-before-published book of social criticism by Trollope (1855–56). This work was brought out as The New Zealander in 1972. Hall followed this publication with various editions and books on Trollope including Trollope and His Illustrators (Macmillan, 1980). In 1983, he published the first complete edition of Trollope's letters. His work on Trollope culminated in Trollope: a Biography (Oxford University Press, 1991), an authoritative work that Anthony Burgess called the "a kind of thanksgiving” and which prompted Clive Davis in The Times to assert that Hall was "arguably the world's leading Trollope scholar."

Hall went on to publish extensively on Max Beerbohm, including an art book, Max Beerbohm Caricatures (Yale, 1997) and a biography, Max Beerbohm: A Kind of a Life (Yale, 2002), which the New York Times called “an attractively spry romp around Beerbohm’s life and repute.” Observing Hall's distinctive approach to his biographical subjects, Thomas Hodgkinson wrote, “Sooner or later everybody gets the biography they deserve.” Hall himself noted that the biography of Trollope was "long, inclusive," and as "impersonal" as possible; whereas the Beerbohm biography was "quite different--short, selective and personal."

His recent books include Belief: A Memoir (Beil, 2007) and two connected epistolary novels, Correspondence: An Adventure in Letters (Godine, 2011) and Bibliophilia: A Novel (Godine, 2016). Of Correspondance, Colleen Mondor writes that the book “serves as an armchair education on Victorian literature. . . . These are literary lessons at their most amiable and a tonic to the chaos of the world around us." In addition, Hall has edited and introduced many books for Oxford World's Classics, Yale University Press, Arno Press, and others. Now in his nineties, Hall continues to be an active writer, sharing his thoughts on his blog, Musings of an Honorary Alte Kaker.

Hall was a regular member of the graduate faculty in English at the CUNY Graduate Center where he taught courses in 19th-century fiction, specializing in the novel, and where he supervised many Ph.D.s. But Hall also simultaneously taught for decades at a CUNY community college in the South Bronx, in one of the poorest congressional districts in the United States where he typically worked with under-resourced and under-prepared college students. Some have seen Hall's scholarly accomplishments as a strange distinction for a community college English professor. As Burgess noted, Hall's immersion in Trollope's world "must be very comforting to a man who works in the Bronx.” And Gene Maeroff, too, observed that Hall's scholarly writing is "removed from the needs of students who must undergo remedial studies." Hall, however, did not regard his community college teaching as a scholarly contradiction: "'There ought to be serious, productive scholars at a community college,' said Dr. Hall, who has turned down job offers from four-year institutions. 'Otherwise, the students will once again feel shortchanged.'"

== Bibliography ==
=== Books ===
- The New Zealander. (Editor). Clarendon Press, Oxford, 1972.
- Trollope and His Illustrators. Macmillan, London, 1980.
- The Letters of Anthony Trollope. 2 vols. Stanford University Press, 1983.
- Trollope: A Biography. Oxford University Press, Oxford, 1991.
- Max Beerbohm Caricatures. Yale University Press, New Haven and London, 1997.
- Max Beerbohm: A Kind of a Life. Yale University Press, New Haven and London, 2002.
- Belief: A Memoir. Frederic C. Beil, Savannah, 2007.
- Correspondence: An Adventure in Letters. David R. Godine, Boston, 2011.
- Bibliophilia: A Novel. David R. Godine, Boston, 2016.

=== Articles ===
- "Seeing Trollope's 'An Autobiography' through the Press: The Correspondence of William Blackwood and Henry Merivale Trollope". The Princeton University Library Chronicle 47.2 (1986): 189–223.
- "Trollope and Carlyle". Nineteenth-Century Fiction 27.2 (Sep., 1972): 197–205.
