= A Peep into the Past =

1923 essay on Oscar Wilde by Max Beerbohm

Title page of A Peep into the Past (1923)

"A Peep into the Past" is a 1923 unauthorized and privately printed essay on Oscar Wilde by caricaturist and parodist Max Beerbohm.

Beerbohm wrote this satire on Oscar Wilde in late 1893 or early 1894 for publication in the first number of The Yellow Book, but it was held over to make way for Beerbohm's essay "A Defence of Cosmetics", which appeared in that journal in April 1894. The essay was possibly withheld because of the impending Wilde scandal. "A Peep into the Past" was never published in The Yellow Book. In 1894 Wilde was at the height of his fame.

In "A Peep into the Past" Beerbohm portrays Wilde as a staid old gentleman with a somewhat suspicious procession of page-boys passing backwards and forwards through his neighbourhood in Chelsea:

"Once a welcome guest in many of our Bohemian haunts, he lives a life of quiet retirement in his little house in Tite Street with his wife and two sons, his prop and mainstay, solacing himself with many a reminiscence of the friends of his youth"... "The old gentleman" (Wilde was 39) continues to write; indeed, he "has not yet abandoned his old intention of dramatising Salome..."

A cutting commentary on Wilde's club life, Beerbohm writes:

"He never nowadays even looks at the morning papers, so wholly has he cut himself off from the society, though he still goes on taking the Athenaeum, in the hopes that it may even now do the same to him."

In 1894 The Athenaeum was London's premier club for eminent men of letters and science. Its membership was made up of the greatest British writers in the nineteenth century. Wilde's name is a conspicuous absence.

Printed privately in 1923 in a limited edition of 300 copies on Japan Vellum, "A Peep into the Past" was published in a glassine wrapper with a card slipcase and box. The first four pages are a facsimile of Beerbohm's original handwritten manuscript.
