= Isle of Escape =

1930 film

- Likenesses of Monte Blue and Myrna Loy
- Directed by: Howard Bretherton
- Written by: J. Grubb Alexander; Lucien Hubbard
- Story by: Jack McLaren
- Based on: play by Campbell Dixon
- Starring: Monte Blue; Myrna Loy; Betty Compson
- Production company: Warner Bros. Pictures
- Distributed by: Warner Bros. Pictures
- Release date: March 1, 1930
- Running time: 60 minutes (6 reels)
- Country: United States
- Language: English
- Budget: $281,000
- Box office: $282,000

Isle of Escape is a 1930 American pre-Code film produced and released by Warner Bros. Pictures. The film stars Monte Blue and Myrna Loy and is set in the South Seas. Blue had been playing man-stranded-on-island roles in such films as White Shadows in the South Seas at MGM towards the end of the silent era and continued doing so in this early talkie. As of 2010, only fragments of the film still exist.

== Plot ==
Dave Wade, a young miner, manages to escape from some cannibals in the South Seas who have killed all of his companions. He arrives at the island of Samora with a bag of gold which he managed to save. Here he meets a brutal man named Shane and a woman named Stella, who had been forced into a secret marriage with Shane. The couple run a small hotel. Stella immediately sympathizes with Dave's plight, while Shane sets his greedy eyes on his gold. After the death of Stella's mother, Dave escapes with her to another island. Here they meet Moira, a native girl, who falls in love with Dave and desperately tries to divert his love away from Stella. Eventually, Shane discovers the whereabouts of his wife and arrives on the island.

== Cast ==
- Monte Blue as Dave Wade
- Myrna Loy as Moira
- Betty Compson as Stella
- Noah Beery, Sr. as Shane
- Ivan F. Simpson as Judge
- Jack Ackroyd as Hank
- Nina Quartero as Loru
- Duke Kahanamoku as Manua
- Nick De Ruiz as Dolobe
- Rose Dione as Ma Blackney
- Adolph Milar as Dutch Planter

== Music ==
The film features a theme song entitled "My Kalua Rose" with music by Edward Ward and lyrics by Al Bryan. A song entitled "Let's Drink To The Isle We Love" which was composed by the same team is also featured on the soundtrack.

== Box office ==
According to Warner Bros., the film earned $224,000 domestically and $58,000 foreign.

== Preservation status ==
Isle of Escape is believed to be a lost film. Around 2010, a small fragment, running about forty seconds, was discovered by a private collector.
