= The Poets' Corner =

1904 book

- Cover of King Penguin edition of The Poets' Corner (1943)
- Author: Max Beerbohm
- Language: English
- Publisher: John Rothenstein
- Publication date: 1904
- Publication place: United States

The Poets' Corner is a book of twenty caricatures by English caricaturist, essayist and parodist Max Beerbohm. It was published in 1904 by William Heinemann, and was Beerbohm's second book of caricatures, the first being Caricatures of Twenty-five Gentlemen (1896).

Named after Poets' Corner, the name traditionally given to a section of the south transept of Westminster Abbey due to the number of poets, playwrights, and writers now buried and commemorated there, the book is a collection of Max Beerbohm's caricatures depicting notable poets from the past up to 1904, including Lord Byron, Samuel Taylor Coleridge, William Shakespeare, Walt Whitman, William Wordsworth, W. B. Yeats, Alfred Tennyson, Robert Browning, Dante, Robert Burns, Matthew Arnold, Dante Gabriel Rossetti and Henrik Ibsen.

The Poets' Corner was republished in 1943 as a King Penguin publication with an introduction by John Rothenstein and expanded to twenty-four colour illustrations.

== Gallery ==
'Dante Gabriel Rossetti in His Back-Garden' from The Poets' Corner

'Coleridge, table-talking' from The Poets' Corner

Matthew Arnold from The Poets' Corner

== See also ==
- Caricatures of Twenty-five Gentlemen (1896)
- Fifty Caricatures (1913)
- Rossetti and His Circle (1922)
