= Secret Agent (1936 film) =

1936 film by Alfred Hitchcock

- US theatrical release poster
- Directed by: Alfred Hitchcock
- Screenplay by: Charles Bennett; Alma Reville; Ian Hay; Jesse Lasky Jr.
- Based on: W. Somerset Maugham (story); Campbell Dixon (play)
- Produced by: Michael Balcon; Ivor Montagu
- Starring: Madeleine Carroll; Peter Lorre; John Gielgud; Robert Young
- Cinematography: Bernard Knowles
- Edited by: Charles Frend
- Music by: John Greenwood; Louis Levy
- Production company: Gaumont British
- Distributed by: Gaumont British Distributors
- Release date: 11 May 1936
- Running time: 86 minutes
- Country: United Kingdom
- Language: English

Secret Agent is a 1936 British spy thriller film directed by Alfred Hitchcock, adapted from the play by Campbell Dixon, which in turn is loosely based on two stories in the 1927 collection Ashenden: Or the British Agent by W. Somerset Maugham. The film stars Madeleine Carroll, Peter Lorre, John Gielgud, and Robert Young. It also features uncredited appearances by Michael Redgrave, future star of Hitchcock's The Lady Vanishes (1938), Michel Saint-Denis as the Coachman, and Michael Rennie in his film debut.

== Plot ==
On 10 May 1916, during World War I, British Captain and novelist Edgar Brodie returns home on leave, to discover his obituary in the newspaper. He is brought to a man identifying himself only as "R", who asks him to undertake a secret mission: to identify and eliminate a German agent on his way to Arabia to stir up trouble in the Middle East. Upon agreeing, Brodie is given a new identity—Richard Ashenden—a fake death, and the assistance of a killer known variously as "the Hairless Mexican" and "the General", though he is neither bald, Mexican, nor a general.

Brodie's late "predecessor" thought that the enemy agent was staying at the Hotel Excelsior in neutral Switzerland. When "Ashenden" arrives there, he is surprised to find that "R" has also provided him with an attractive wife, Elsa Carrington. Entering their suite, he also encounters her new admirer, fellow hotel guest Robert Marvin, who is only slightly deterred by the arrival of her husband (and continues to flirt with Elsa). When they are alone, Ashenden is displeased when Elsa reveals she insisted upon the assignment for the thrill of it.

Ashenden and the General go to contact a double agent, the church organist, only to find him dead. In his hand, however, they find a button, evidently torn off in the struggle with his killer. When they go to the casino to meet Elsa, the button is accidentally dropped onto a gambling table. Since it looks the same as his own buttons, an experienced mountaineer named Caypor assumes it is his.

The agents persuade Caypor to help them settle a concocted bet: which one of them can climb higher on a nearby mountain. As the moment approaches, Ashenden finds he is unable to commit cold-blooded murder, but the General has no such qualms and pushes the unsuspecting Caypor off a cliff. Meanwhile, Elsa becomes distraught at the thought of killing.

A coded telegram informs them that Caypor is not their target. Ashenden is shocked, but the General finds it very funny. Elsa decides to quit, despite having told Ashenden that she fell in love with him at first sight. In the lobby, she encounters Marvin. With no destination in mind, she persuades him to take her along with him. Meanwhile, the other two bribe a worker at a chocolate factory (the secret "German spy post office") to show them a very important message received the day before. They discover that it is addressed to none other than Marvin.

Ashenden and the General set out in pursuit, taking the same train as Marvin and Elsa. Before they can arrange anything, the train crosses the border into Turkey – enemy territory – and a large number of soldiers board. Despite this, they manage to get Marvin alone in his compartment. Objecting to cold-blooded murder, Elsa draws a pistol. Before Ashenden can do anything, one way or the other, the train is attacked and derailed by airplanes sent by "R". Marvin is pinned in the wreckage, but manages to shoot the General fatally before dying. The "Ashendens" quit the spy business.

== Cast ==
- John Gielgud as Captain Edgar Brodie / Richard Ashenden
- Peter Lorre as The General
- Madeleine Carroll as Elsa Carrington / Mrs Ashenden
- Robert Young as Robert Marvin
- Percy Marmont as Caypor
- Florence Kahn as Mrs Caypor
- Charles Carson as 'R'
- Lilli Palmer as Lilli
- Howard Marion-Crawford as Karl (uncredited)
- Tom Helmore as Colonel Anderson (uncredited)
- Michael Rennie as Army Captain (uncredited)

== Reception ==
The film was voted the fifth best British film of 1936.

On the review aggregator website Rotten Tomatoes, 87% of 22 critics' reviews are positive, with an average rating of 8.8/10. Metacritic, which uses a weighted average, assigned the film a score of 67 out of 100, based on 9 critics, indicating "generally favorable" reviews.

=== Critical response ===
Variety called the film "good spy entertainment," adding that Hitchcock had "done well at blending the tale's grim theme with deftly fashioned humor, appropriate romantic interplay and some swell outdoor photography." Harrison's Reports declared it "A pretty good espionage melodrama." John Mosher of The New Yorker called it a "good picture," adding, "The 39 Steps was a first-rate English thriller, you may know, and the bright, quick fresh touch that made it good isn't lacking here."

The Monthly Film Bulletin praised the "technical quality" of the film and called the acting "good," but thought that the ending was "brief and not very satisfactory" and that it was "often difficult to know quite what (Hitchcock) is getting at, whether he is making a profound protest against war and senseless murder or just presenting simple melodrama." Benjamin Roy Crisler of The New York Times disliked the film, praising Peter Lorre for his performance as "one of the most amusing and somehow one of the most wistfully appealing trigger men since Victor Moore," but criticizing technical aspects such as "inexpert camera technique" and "strangely uneven sound recording." He also thought Madeleine Carroll was a "waste" in her role.

Writing for The Spectator in 1936, Graham Greene gave the film a poor review, characterizing it as a despoilment of Maugham's Ashenden and dismissing it as "a series of small 'amusing' melodramatic situations". According to Greene, Hitchcock "builds up to these tricky situations (paying no attention on the way to inconsistencies, loose ends, psychological absurdities) and then drops them: they mean nothing: they lead to nothing". Greene jokes that the inconsistencies may have at least livened the film with laughter.

Geoff Andrew of Time Out wrote: "This thriller may not be one of Hitchcock's best English films, but it is full of startling set pieces and quirky characterisation".
