= Seven Men =

1919 Max Beerbohm short story set

Cover of the first edition of Seven Men (1919)

Seven Men is a collection of five short stories written by English caricaturist, essayist and parodist Max Beerbohm. It was published in Britain in 1919 by Heinemann. In the United States there was a 1920 limited edition from Alfred A. Knopf with drawings of the characters by Beerbohm, followed by a popular edition in 1921. An enlarged edition, Seven Men, and Two Others, containing the new story "Felix Argallo and Walter Ledgett" interpolated as the last but one item, was published by Heinemann in 1950.

== The work ==
Seven Men contains Beerbohm's persuasive biographies of six characters from the fin-de-siècle world of the 1890s. Interacting with them, Beerbohm himself is the seventh man. As a leading member of the literary life of that past time, he writes "with such circumstantial detail and such gentle realism" that readers are lulled almost into accepting the fantastic events that he describes.

Four of the five stories in the collection had previously appeared in The Century Magazine: "James Pethel" in January 1915, "Enoch Soames" in May 1916, "A. V. Laider" in June 1916, "Hilary Maltby" (under that title) in February 1919. The story that was added to the enlarged edition of 1950 had originally appeared as "Not that I would boast" in the London Mercury in May 1927.

The growing popularity of the collection, already described as "a little masterpiece" by Virginia Woolf, was endorsed by the same judgment being repeated in a recent Encyclopædia Britannica. Martin Maner has commented of Seven Men and Two Others that in it Beerbohm anticipated postmodernism and specifically that it is "a postmodernist fiction written before its time" in such features as "its narrative self-consciousness" and "its blurring of the boundary lines between fact and fiction", its use of parody and Beerbohm's insistence that the book's format "should be of a kind suitable to a book of essays".

== The characters ==
Seven Men includes three supernatural comedies, "Enoch Soames: A Memory of the Eighteen-Nineties", "Hilary Maltby and Stephen Braxton" and "A. V. Laider".

In the first of these, Enoch Soames is the Decadent author of three "dim" works in various genres that go completely unrecognised. Convinced of his own genius, he makes a pact with the Devil to go a century forward in time so as to read what others have written about his work. All he could find, however, was an account of Max's story of their friendship in which the critic described him as an imaginary writer. The story was frequently adapted for radio performance between 1939 and 1998.

"Hilary Maltby and Stephen Braxton" are novelists of contrasting character who achieve literary success at the same time. Both then sink into obscurity and Max only learns the reason decades later when he runs into Maltby in a small Italian town. Maltby admits that after he had been invited to an aristocratic country house weekend he had persuaded his hostess not to invite Braxton. The envious Braxton revenges himself by sending a doppelgänger who ruins Maltby's social success. The story has been described as "semi-autobiographical", in that the location and characters are based on reality. In 1950 it was adapted for performance on the BBC Third Programme by Douglas Cleverdon.

Max meets "A. V. Laider" while convalescing from influenza at a seaside hostel one February. In a very English way, they manage to avoid speaking to each other for almost their entire stay and only start on Max's last evening there. Then a chance remark about palmistry leads Laider to admit once foreseeing the future death of his companions in their palms on a return by train from a stay in the country and not warning them through weakness of will. At the same time the following year, Max meets Laider again at the hostel and the latter admits that he is a fantasist and that his story was untrue. They pass the rest of their stay in comfortable silence until on the final evening a chance remark reminds Laider of something awful that had once happened to him. "It was", says Max, "a very awful thing indeed." The story was later adapted for both radio and television performance.

It is in the casino at Dieppe that Max encounters the gambler "James Pethel" and, though he finds most gamblers repulsive, warms to Pethel because he is not typical. Over the course of the next day, which Max spends with Pethel and his family, it becomes clear to Max that it is risk-taking in all departments of life that appeals to Pethel – in his investments and business dealings and in leisure activities like swimming in rough seas and motoring at speed. Disgusted that Pethel risks not only his own life but those he loves for the sake of experiencing the keenest of thrills, Max refuses to follow up Pethel's demonstrations of friendship. In Joseph Epstein's opinion, the portrait drawn in the story is "the best literary work on the subject of gambling … written by an outsider".

The later interpolated story, "Felix Argallo and Walter Ledgett", is largely set in the Edwardian era. Max attempts to play the good angel to Ledgett, a popular author whose reputation is being ruined by deprecating remarks made about him in the posthumously published letters of the great. To restore Ledgett's confidence, Max persuades Argallo, a late literary success, to write four letters addressed to Beerbohm that praise the writer's work. Shortly afterwards, Argallo commits suicide and Beerbohm submits the letters to a memoir of him. Since the letters refer to incidents involving Argallo and Ledgett together, of which Ledgett naturally has no memory, Max then has to persuade him that he is suffering from a rare form of amnesia.

"'Savonarola' Brown" is a hybrid work consisting of a farcical introduction to a farcical Shakespearian tragedy. A clerk with dramatic leanings intended to take Sardanapalus as his subject but, because the encyclopedia he consulted had opened first at Savonarola, took him as subject instead. Max is named his literary executor after Brown is run over by a bus. He then discovers an unfinished verse drama full of anachronisms, not the least of which are modern idioms adapted to Elizabethan English – "Seeming hawk is dove/ And dove's a gaol-bird now. Fie out upon 't!" Read on the page, with time to reflect on it, the script is extremely funny. But when the BBC put on a performance in March 1939 the reviewer in The Listener thought that a mistake. Nevertheless, there were additional performances between 1945 and 1947.
