= Elisabeth Jungmann =

Interpreter, secretary and wife of Max Beerbohm (1894–1958)

- Elisabeth Jungmann
- Born: 24 April 1894; Lublinitz, Upper Silesia (now Lubliniec, Poland)
- Died: 28 December 1958 (aged 63–64); Rapallo, Italy
- Occupations: Interpreter, secretary

Elisabeth Jungmann, Lady Beerbohm (24 April 1894 – 28 December 1958) was an interpreter and the secretary, literary executor and second wife of the writer, caricaturist and parodist Sir Max Beerbohm.

Born to a German Jewish family in Lublinitz in Upper Silesia, Jungmann was the daughter of Adolf and Agnes Jungmann and the sister of Otto Jungmann and sociologist and historian Eva Gabriele Reichmann. She served as a nurse for the German Army during World War I. Jungmann was the personal secretary and English interpreter for Gerhart Hauptmann from 1922 to 1933, and then for Rudolf G. Binding. Binding had hoped to marry Jungmann but was prevented from doing so by the Nuremberg Laws as she was Jewish.

Jungmann had been a friend of the Beerbohms since 1927 when she had translated at a meeting between Beerbohm and Hauptmann, who wintered in Rapallo, Italy. She became a regular visitor to their home, the Villino Chiaro in Rapallo. Elisabeth Jungmann went to Britain at the start of World War II, where she resumed her friendship with the Beerbohms at their temporary home in Abinger. During the war, Jungmann worked for the Jewish Central Information Office in London as a research assistant. She went on to work for the Political Intelligence Department, a section of the British Home Office. After the war she stayed in London, working for the Control Commission for Germany and Austria which was involved in developing the "cultural revival of Germany". Beerbohm wrote a letter to the Aliens Tribunal on her behalf urging her suitability for British citizenship. When Jungmann's mother died in 1942 while being transported to Auschwitz-Birkenau, Beerbohm wrote a letter of condolence to her. When the Beerbohms returned to the Villino Chiaro after the war, Jungmann visited them there every summer.

On the death of his first wife, Florence Kahn, in 1951, Beerbohm called Jungmann in London. She immediately travelled out to his villa in Rapallo where she took care of the funeral arrangements. She became Beerbohm's secretary, confidante and carer. Jungmann acted as hostess to Beerbohm's many visitors, including Ezra Pound, who lived nearby, and Somerset Maugham, John Gielgud, Laurence Olivier and Truman Capote among others.

Jungmann once told Beerbohm how she would have liked to have met Isaac Newton, famous for his law of gravity. Beerbohm said that he would not have understood Newton, to which Jungmann replied "He would have liked you." "Yes," Max agreed, "I would have taught him the Law of Levity."

She became Lady Beerbohm when Beerbohm married her privately on his death bed on 20 April 1956 to ensure that under Italian law she would inherit all his possessions. On Beerbohm's death in May 1956 Jungmann became his literary executor. After her own death in 1958 her sister Eva Reichmann became the executor of Max Beerbohm's literary estate. She was the subject of a biography by Corry Nethery.
