= The Works of Max Beerbohm =

1896 book of essays by Max Beerbohm

The Works of Max Beerbohm was the first book published by English caricaturist, essayist and parodist Max Beerbohm. It was published in 1896 when Beerbohm was aged 24.

A collection of Beerbohm's essays from the 1890s written while he was still a student at Oxford and which had originally been printed in The Yellow Book, The Savoy, The Pageant, The Chap Book, and other notable periodicals, the book was published in London by John Lane at The Bodley Head in 1896, and launched Beerbohm's career as an essayist.

The book contains Beerbohm's notorious essay A Defence of Cosmetics, which had appeared in the first number of The Yellow Book in April 1894, revised and renamed The Pervasion of Rouge.

"Replete with mock-scholarly footnotes and biographical information, The Works epitomizes Beerbohm's penchant for deflating pretentiousness with satiric imitation," wrote Ann Adams Cleary in the Dictionary of Literary Biography. "Anything large - ideas, ideals, literary works, London crowds - caused him dismay."

In this, his first book, the 24-year-old Beerbohm announced gravely that he would now retire from letters, having said all there was to say. Of course, he did not.

A limited edition of 780 copies, signed and numbered by the author, was issued in 1922, with 750 being offered for sale, while the remaining 30 were for presentation.

== Contents ==
Dandies and Dandies

A Good Prince

1880

King George the Fourth

The Pervasion of Rouge

Poor Romeo!

Diminuendo

Bibliography

== See also ==
- Mainly on the Air (1946)
