= Enoch Soames =

1916 short story by Max Beerbohm

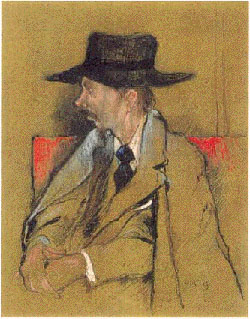
Enoch Soames in 1895 as depicted by William Rothenstein

"Enoch Soames" is the title of a short story by the British writer Max Beerbohm. Enoch Soames is also the name of the main character.

The piece was originally published in the May 1916 edition of The Century Magazine, and was later included in Beerbohm's anthology Seven Men (1919). It is a comic tragedy, involving elements of both fantasy and science fiction, well known for its clever and humorous use of the concepts of time travel and pacts with the Devil.

The author uses a complex combination of fact and fiction to create a sense of realism. Although Enoch Soames is a fictional character, Beerbohm includes himself in the story, which he also narrates; and writes it as the reminiscences of a series of actual events that he witnessed and participated in as a younger man. The work also contains a written portrait of the real-life artist William Rothenstein, as well as countless references to contemporary-to-1897 events and places. In addition, Rothenstein actually drew the "portrait" of Soames that is mentioned in the text; although the work was probably created closer to the date of publication than to the 1895 date given in the story. Beerbohm himself also drew a cartoon-sketch of Soames, and the two pictures are recognisably of the same "person".

== Plot summary ==
Enoch Soames by Max Beerbohm

Writing as a narrator describing events from his own past, Beerbohm presents himself as a moderately successful young English essayist during the 1890s. He then relates the tragic history of an older colleague named Enoch Soames. The son of a bookseller from Preston, living off an inherited annuity, he is an utterly obscure, forgettable aspiring poet in the Decadent manner. Over the course of the story, he authors three unsuccessful books, of which Beerbohm provides parodies of his book of poems, "Fungoids". Soames’s appearance is described as “dim” and leaves little impression, except for his persistent habit of always wearing a particular grey waterproof cape and soft black hat.

On the afternoon of 3 June 1897, Soames and Beerbohm are having lunch in the Soho-based "Restaurant du Vingtieme Siecle". The self-obsessed Soames is deeply depressed, consumed with the belief that he is an unrecognised great author and, despite his complete failure so far, keenly curious about his "certain" posthumous fame. He therefore agrees to a contract offered by the Devil, who introduces himself from a neighbouring table. In exchange for the possession of his soul, Soames will be transported exactly 100 years forward in time to spend the rest of the afternoon in the British Museum Reading Room and discover what judgement posterity will make on himself and his works. After the allotted time has expired, Soames will be returned to their present date and location, but at the same time of evening as his departure from the future, and the Devil will then collect his payment.

Soames then vanishes and reappears in the café at the designated hour, where Beerbohm has returned to meet him. Soames’s description of the world of the future is vague and nondescript; while there he had focused primarily on his own concerns. He tells Beerbohm that the only mention he could find of himself was in a single scholarly article, of which Soames produces a facsimile-copy. It is printed in English, but in a phonetic spelling and with modified pronunciation, both of which had apparently evolved during the intervening century. The article discusses a "labud sattire" written by one Max Beerbohm "in wich e pautraid an immajnari karrakter kauld Enoch Soames — a thurd-rait poit hoo beleevz imself a grate jeneus an maix a bargin with th Devvl in auder ter no wot posterriti thinx ov im!" (in which he portrayed an imaginary character called Enoch Soames—a third-rate poet who believes himself a great genius and makes a bargain with the Devil to know what posterity thinks of him).

Beerbohm is shocked and denies that he would ever write such a thing. Before being taken to Hell, on the Devil's return, Soames scornfully requests that Beerbohm at least try to make people believe that he, Soames, actually existed. Beerbohm's narrative is that justification. He notes in particular that Soames mentioned that his presence in the reading room had caused a great stir, but "I assure you that in no period could Soames be anything but dim. The fact that people are going to stare at him, and follow him around, and seem afraid of him, can be explained only on the hypothesis that they will somehow have been prepared for his ghostly visitation. They will have been awfully waiting to see whether he really would come. And when he does come, the effect will of course be – awful."

== Follow-up ==
The Reading Room of the British Museum was in fact still in operation in June 1997, although it was closed later that year and its functions were transferred to the new British Library. This move had been intended to occur long before that time, but construction and completion of the new British national library building were repeatedly delayed. The "old" Reading Room was subsequently renovated; its original interior decoration was restored and it reopened in 2000, but the space is now used for different purposes and it no longer serves its former purpose as a research library.

An article written by Teller, "A Memory of the Nineteen-Nineties" ("Being a faithful account of the events of the designated day, when the man who had disappeared was expected briefly to return"), was published in the November 1997 issue of The Atlantic Monthly. The piece claims to describe actual events, witnessed by Teller and a small group of other people: fans of Beerbohm's story, who had come to the Reading Room on the date specified, in time for Soames's afternoon "visit". According to this account, at 2:10 PM, on 3 June 1997, a person meeting Soames's description mysteriously appeared, and began searching through the catalogues and various biographical dictionaries. A few minutes later, he slipped out of sight of the watching crowd, and disappeared among the stacks.

In an October 2012 Esquire article, writer Chris Jones implied that Teller himself had staged this event, although the magician "didn't confess his role. He never has."
