= Florence Kahn (actress) =

American actress

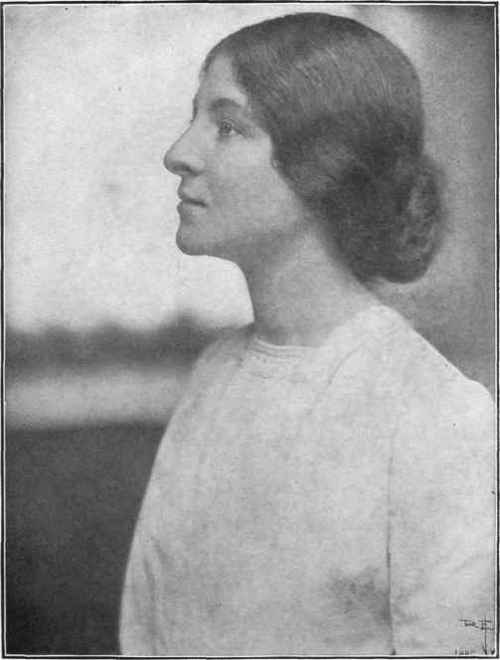
- Florence Kahn in Ibsen's When We Dead Awaken in 1900
- Born: 3 March 1878; Memphis, Tennessee, United States
- Died: 13 January 1951 (aged 72); Rapallo, Italy
- Occupation: Actress
- Spouse: Sir Max Beerbohm (m. 1910–1951)

Florence Kahn, Lady Beerbohm (March 3, 1878, Memphis, Tennessee – January 13, 1951, Rapallo, Italy) was an American actress and the first wife of caricaturist and parodist Sir Max Beerbohm.

== Acting career ==
Her father Louis Kahn was a German-Jewish immigrant from Baden who married Pauline Freiberg, a member of a prominent Cincinnati family. He founded the dry goods firm of Kahn & Freiberg in Memphis in 1860 and was also an amateur Shakespeare scholar. Florence's brother Samuel Kahn became an editor of The Commercial Appeal in Memphis. She attended the Clara Conway Institute, a private school in Memphis, and had dancing lessons before going to a finishing school, which she left in June 1894. In 1895 she studied drama at Miss Grace Llewellyn's studio in Memphis. She also attended the American Academy of Dramatic Arts in New York.

Florence Kahn appeared in the first American performance of Maeterlinck's Intérieur in February 1896. On graduating in April 1897 she joined a touring company as the female lead in The Girl I Left Behind Me. In spring 1898 she played Lady de Winter in The Musketeers with Paul Gilmore in New York, and later on tour.

Kahn appeared in New York in El Gran Galeoto by José Echegaray at the Carnegie Lyceum New York City in 1899, and went on to become a well known Broadway actress noted for her roles in the plays of Ibsen.

She played Hilda in the first performance of When We Dead Awaken in America which took place at the Carnegie Lyceum on January 16, 1900. She also appeared in The Master Builder (1900) as Hilda Wangel. Of her performance in the latter The New York Times wrote:

The only notable feature of the performance was the acting of Miss Florence Kahn as the strange girl, Hilda Wangel, a healthy buoyant creature from the mountains, who still has a touch of the neurotic in her composition, and is united to the unhappy architect by a mystic bond: who invades his household as one answering a spiritual call, awakens the better side of his nature to a mood of self-revelation, and inspires him to a symbolical feat which causes his death. Miss Kahn's portrayal could scarcely be called either coherent or consistent. It was full of crudity. But it possessed a certain poetical quality, was full of youthful spirit, and was not always overwrought or artificial

She appeared with the actor Richard Mansfield, as Chorus in Shakespeare's Henry V in 1900. She appeared in Don Caesar's Return by Victor Mapes at Wallack's Theatre in New York in 1901. In March 1904 Kahn appeared as Rebecca West in Ibsen's Rosmersholm, but the production was not a success and closed quickly, with Kahn receiving much of the blame:

She "acted" always, not for a moment was she a live woman, least of all an Ibsen heroine. She waved across the stage and coiled upon the furniture, and when the crisis of passion ran highest she looked foolish and bleated.

After the failure of Rosmersholm in New York, in 1904 she travelled to Great Britain with a letter of introduction to Max Beerbohm. Beerbohm became infatuated with Kahn and called on her regularly, taking her to meet his family. On her return to America in 1907 Kahn appeared in Ibsen's Hedda Gabler and Rosmersholm in New York City's Lyric Theatre.

In February 1908 Kahn returned to Britain where she appeared as Rebecca West in Ibsen's Rosmersholm, opening at Terry's Theatre. She then toured Britain presenting a series of readings, on one occasion appearing before King Edward VII. It was during this tour that she was courted by Beerbohm and they became engaged in 1908.

== Marriage ==
Florence Beerbohm drawn in about 1918 by Max Beerbohm

It has been estimated that during their six-year courtship Beerbohm wrote over 1,000 letters to Kahn. When they were apart he wrote every day, sometimes more than once a day. After their marriage on May 4, 1910, at Paddington Register Office the couple moved to the Villino Chiaro in Rapallo in Italy where they remained for the rest of their lives apart from when they returned to the United Kingdom during World War I and World War II. From the start of the marriage, Beerbohm's friends did not like Kahn, thinking the couple ill-matched. They thought Kahn to be "nervous, shy, timid, retiring, humourless, moralizing, idealizing, prudish, frequently sad and depressed and anti-social", in fact the very opposite of Beerbohm.

In 1931, the Beerbohms returned to Britain so that Kahn could act in Luigi Pirandello's play La Vita che ti Diedi (The Life I Gave You) with a small repertory company in Huddersfield. She returned again in 1935 to play Ase in Peer Gynt at the Old Vic, and in February 1936 she played the Duchess of Gloucester in the Oxford Union Dramatic Society's production of Richard II, directed by John Gielgud. In 1936, Kahn made her only known fllm role, appearing with Gielgud as Mrs Caypor in Alfred Hitchcock's film Secret Agent. At that time not only had she never made a film before but she had never seen one either.

== Death ==
Florence Kahn, Lady Beerbohm, died at Rapallo in Italy in 1951 aged 72. She was cremated in Genoa and her ashes scattered from a boat in the Bay of Tigullio. In 1956, her widower Max Beerbohm married his companion and secretary Elisabeth Jungmann on his death bed.

== Filmography ==
- Secret Agent (1936) - Mrs. Caypor
