= William Rothenstein =

British artist and art writer (1872–1945)

Sir William Rothenstein
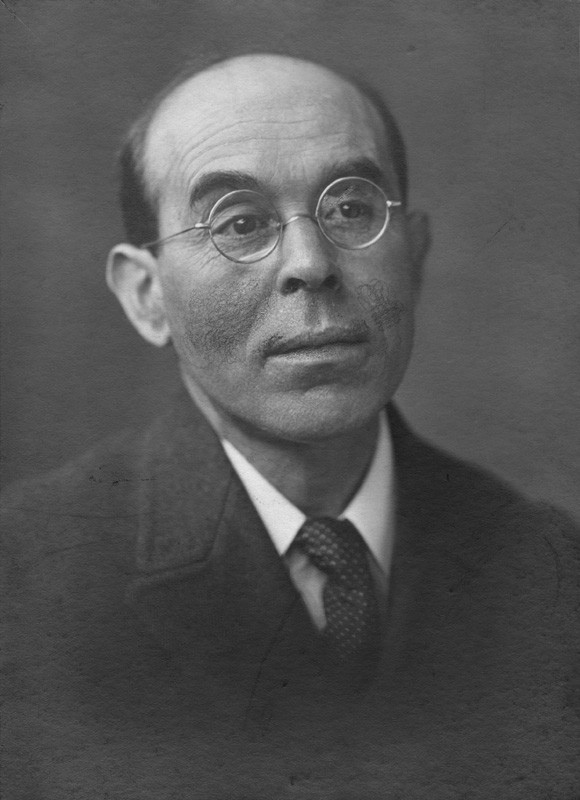
- Rothenstein by George Charles Beresford in 1920
- Born: 29 January 1872; Bradford, West Riding of Yorkshire, England
- Died: 14 February 1945 (aged 73); London, England
- Education: Bradford Grammar School, Slade School of Fine Art; Académie Julian
- Known for: Painting
- Spouse: Alice Knewstub
- Children: 4, including John and Michael

Sir William Rothenstein (29 January 1872 – 14 February 1945) was an English painter, printmaker, draughtsman, lecturer, and writer on art. Though he covered many subjects – ranging from landscapes in France to representations of Jewish synagogues in London – he is perhaps best known for his work as a war artist in both world wars, his portraits, and his popular memoirs, written in the 1930s. More than two hundred of Rothenstein's portraits of famous people can be found in the National Portrait Gallery collection. The Tate Gallery also holds a large collection of his paintings, prints and drawings. Rothenstein served as principal at the Royal College of Art from 1920 to 1935. He was knighted in 1931 for his services to art. In March 2015 'From Bradford to Benares: the Art of Sir William Rothenstein', the first major exhibition of Rothenstein's work for over forty years, opened at Bradford's Cartwright Hall Gallery, touring to the Ben Uri in London later that year.

== Personal life ==
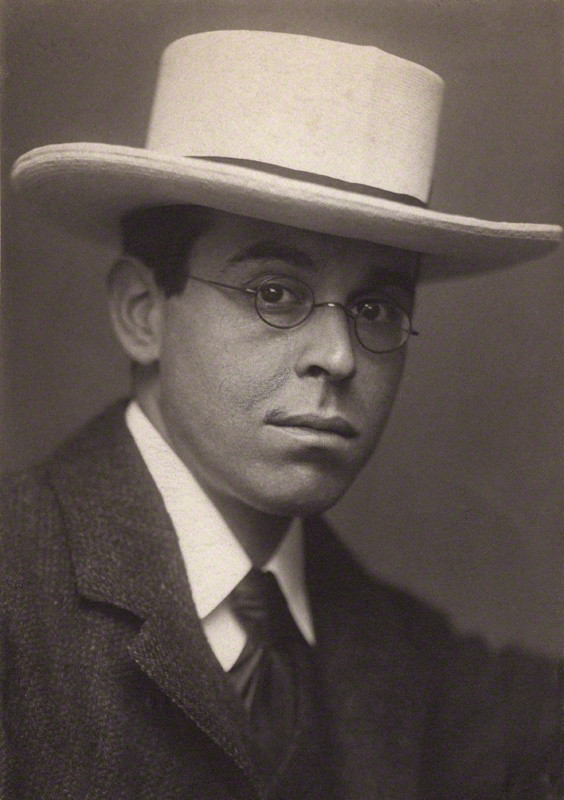
Sir William Rothenstein, photo by George Charles Beresford, 1902

William Rothenstein was born into a German-Jewish family in Bradford, West Riding of Yorkshire, where he was educated at Bradford Grammar School. His father, Moritz, emigrated from Germany in 1859 to work in Bradford's burgeoning textile industry. Soon afterwards he married Bertha Dux and they had six children, of whom William was the fifth.

William's two brothers, Charles and Albert, were also heavily involved in the arts. Charles (1866–1927), who followed his father into the wool trade, was an important collector – and left his entire collection to Manchester Art Gallery in 1925. Albert (1881–1953) was a painter, illustrator and costume designer. Both brothers changed their surname to Rutherston during the First World War.

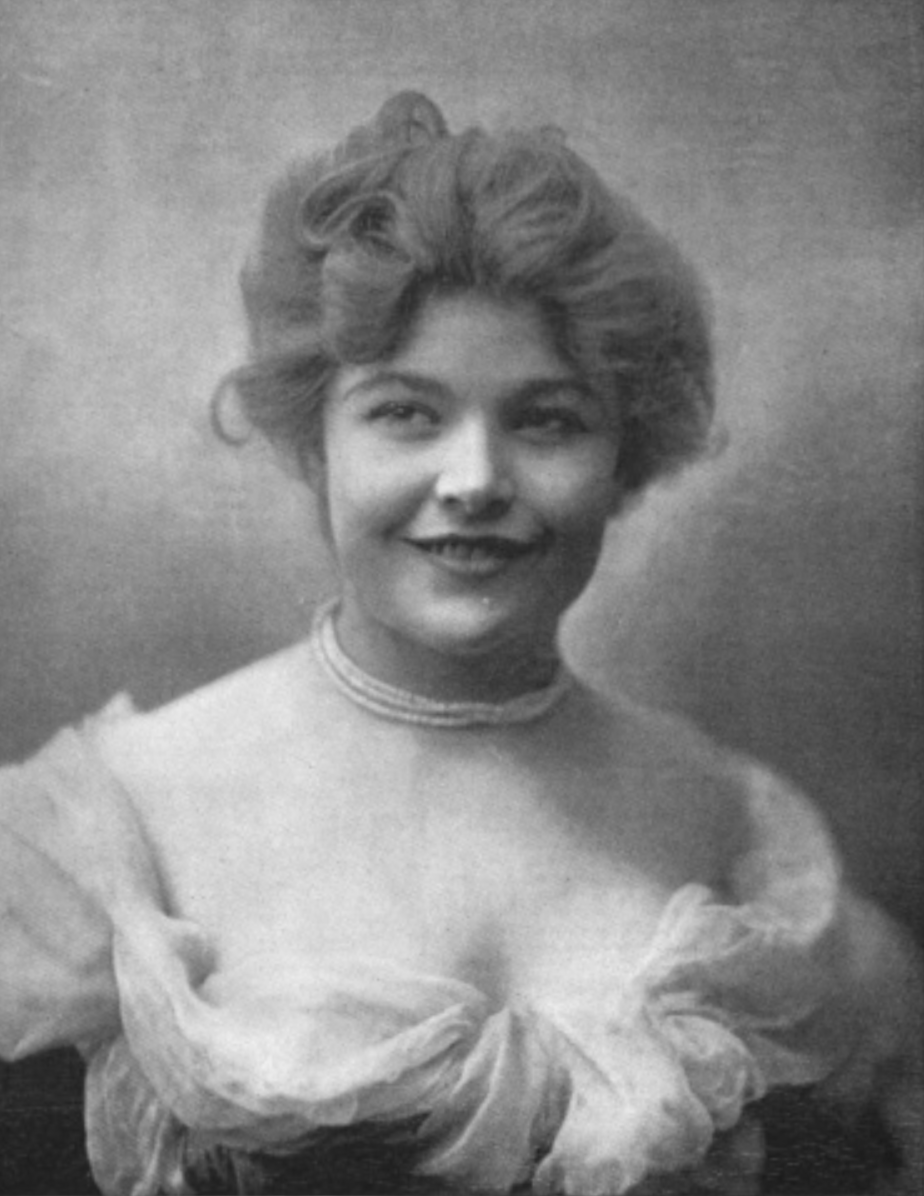
Alice Kingsley (Knewstub)

In 1899, he married Alice Knewstub, an actress known as Alice Kingsley and the daughter of Walter John Knewstub. The couple had four children: John, Betty, Rachel and Michael. John Rothenstein later gained fame as an art historian and art administrator (he was Director of the Tate Gallery from 1938 to 1964 and was knighted in 1952). Michael Rothenstein was a talented printmaker.

== Education ==
Rothenstein left Bradford Grammar School at the age of sixteen to study at the Slade School of Art, London (1888–93), where he was taught by Alphonse Legros, and the Académie Julian in Paris (1889–1893), where he met and was encouraged by James McNeill Whistler, Edgar Degas and Henri de Toulouse-Lautrec. While in Paris he also befriended the Anglo-Australian artist Charles Conder, with whom he shared a studio in Montmartre.

== Career ==
=== Artist ===
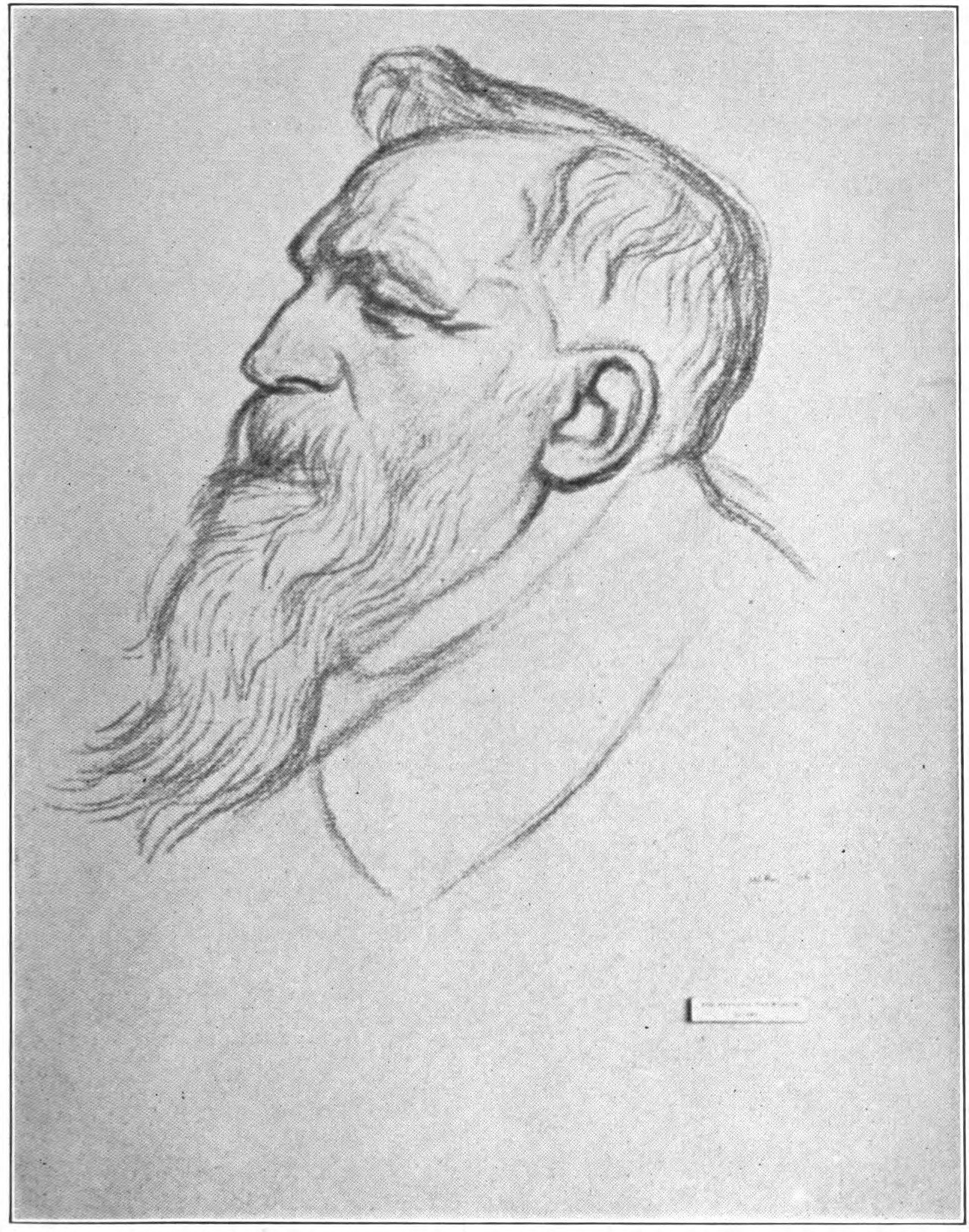
Rothenstein's portrait drawing of Auguste Rodin

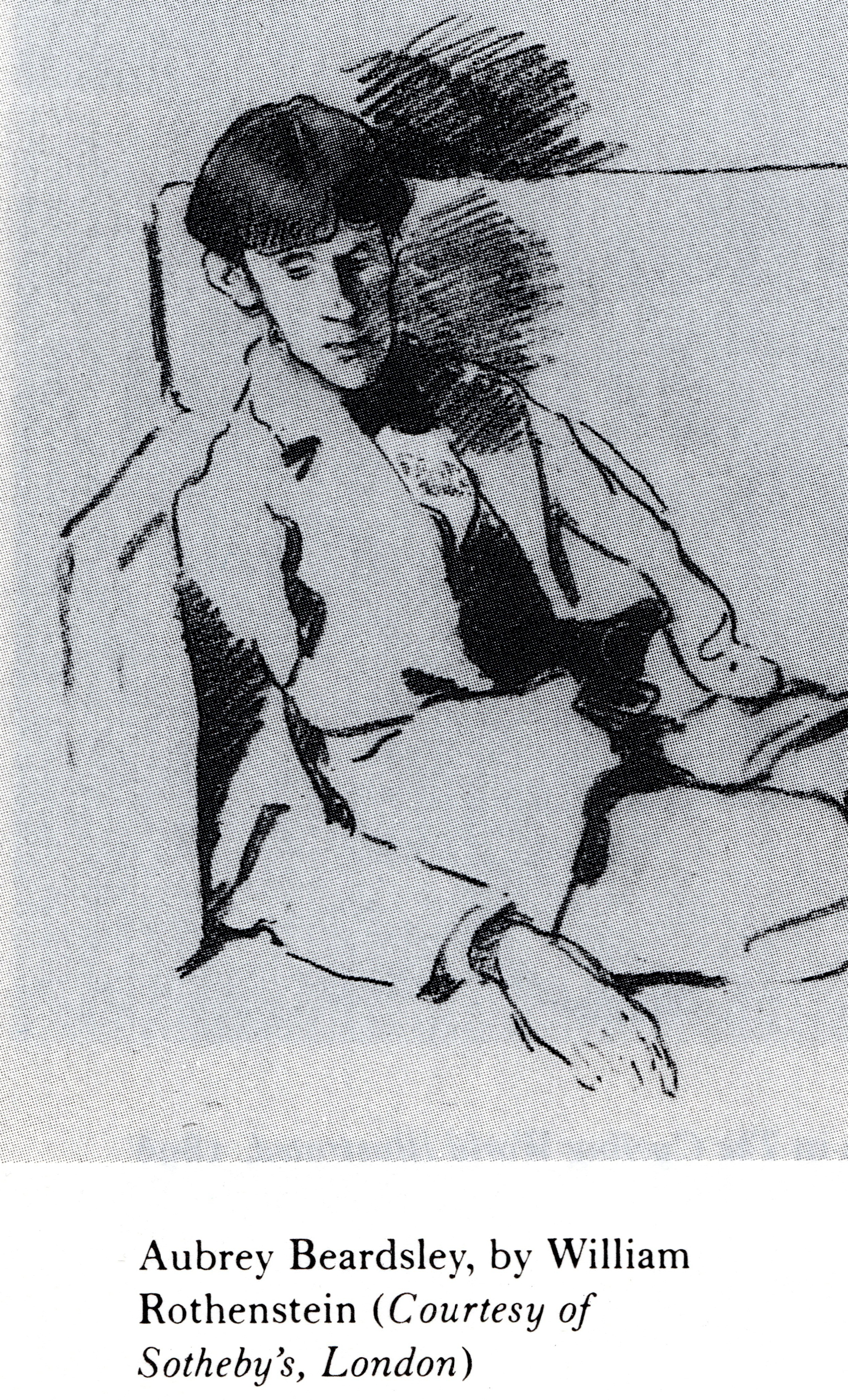
Rothenstein's drawing of Aubrey Beardsley

In 1893 Rothenstein returned to Britain to work on "Oxford Characters" a series of lithographic portraits, eventually published in 1896 Other portrait collections by the artist include English Portraits (1898), Twelve Portraits (1929) and Contemporaries (1937). In Oxford he met and became a close friend of the caricaturist and parodist Max Beerbohm, who later immortalised him in the short story Enoch Soames (1919). During the 1890s Rothenstein exhibited with the New English Art Club and contributed drawings to The Yellow Book and The Savoy.

In 1898–99 he co-founded the Carfax Gallery (or Carfax & Co) in St. James' Piccadilly with John Fothergill (later innkeeper of the Spread Eagle in Thame). During its early years the gallery was closely associated with artists Charles Conder, Philip Wilson Steer, Charles Ricketts and Augustus John. It also exhibited the work of Auguste Rodin, whose growing reputation in England owed much to Rothenstein's friendship. Rothenstein's role as artistic manager of the gallery was abandoned in 1901, whereupon the firm came under the management of his close friend Robert Ross. Ross left in 1908, leaving the gallery in the hands of longtime financial manager Arthur Clifton. Under Clifton the gallery was the home for all three exhibitions of the Camden Town Group, led by Rothenstein's friend and close contemporary Walter Sickert.

In 1900 Rothenstein won a silver medal for his painting The Doll's House at the Exposition Universelle. This painting continues to be one of his best-known and most critically acclaimed works, and was the subject of a recent in-depth study published by the Tate Gallery.

The style and subject of Rothenstein's paintings varies, though certain themes reappear, in particular an interest in 'weighty' or 'essential' subjects tackled in a restrained manner. Good examples include Parting at Morning (1891), Mother and Child (1903) and Jews Mourning at a Synagogue (1907) – all of which are owned by the Tate Gallery.

Between 1902 and 1912 Rothenstein lived in Hampstead, London, where his social circle included H. G. Wells, Joseph Conrad and the artist Augustus John. Amongst the young artists to visit Rothenstein in Hampstead were Wyndham Lewis, Mark Gertler and Paul Nash. During this period Rothenstein worked on a series of important paintings in the predominantly Jewish East End of London, some of which were included in the influential 1906 exhibition of Jewish Art and Antiquaries at the Whitechapel Gallery.

Another feature of this period are the celebrated interiors he painted, the most famous of which is The Browning Readers (1900), now owned by Cartwright Hall gallery, Bradford. Most of Rothenstein's interiors feature members of his family, especially his wife Alice. Reminiscent of Dutch painting (particularly Vermeer and Rembrandt), they are similar in style to contemporary works by William Orpen, who became Rothenstein's brother-in-law in 1901, marrying Alice's sister Grace. Other notable interiors include Spring, The Morning Room (c.1910) and Mother and Child, Candlight (c. 1909).

Rothenstein maintained a lifelong fascination for Indian sculpture and painting, and in 1910 set out on a seminal tour of the subcontinent's major artistic and religious sites. This began with a visit to the ancient Buddhist caves of Ajanta, where he observed Lady Christiana Herringham and Nandalal Bose making watercolour copies of the ancient frescoes. He subsequently contributed a chapter on their importance to the published edition. The trip ended with a stay in Calcutta, where he witnessed the attempts of Abanindranath Tagore to revive the techniques and aesthetics of traditional Indian painting.

He was a member of the International Society of Sculptors, Painters and Gravers.

=== Royal College of Art ===
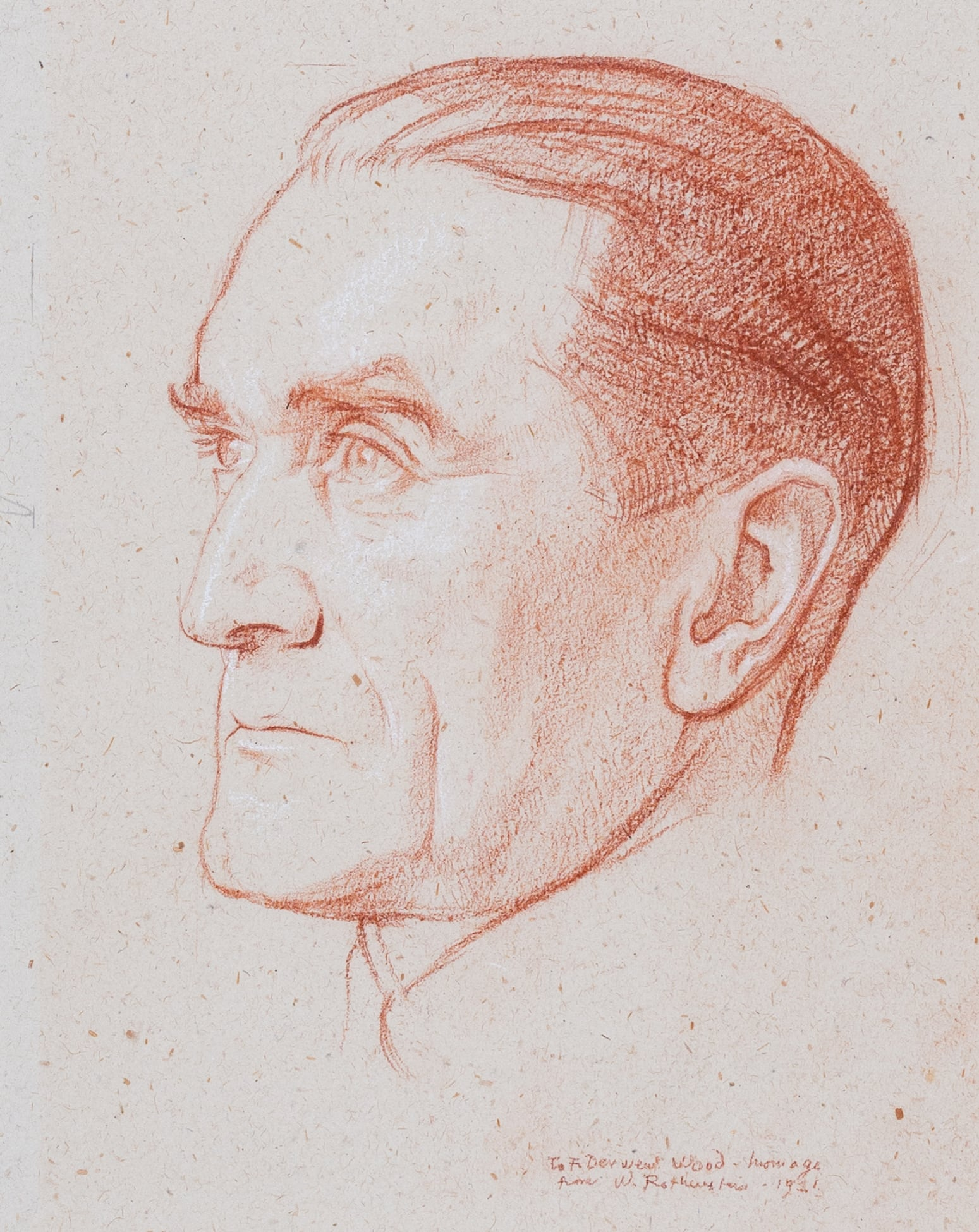
Chalk drawing of Francis Derwent Wood, inscribed 'To F Derwent Wood – Homage from W Rothenstein, 1921'. Wood was Professor of Sculpture at the Royal College of Art when Rothenstein was Principal.

Rothenstein was principal of the Royal College of Art from 1920 to 1935, where he encouraged figures including Edward Burra, Evelyn Dunbar, U Ba Nyan and Henry Moore. Moore was later to write that Rothenstein "gave me the feeling that there was no barrier, no limit to what a young provincial student could get to be and do". Rothenstein was a master of lobbying and advocacy for his students, notably when, thanks to his efforts, Edward Bawden and Eric Ravilious were commissioned to paint a mural in the dining room of Morley College. After being appointed, he introduced greater informality and was permitted to appoint practising artists, including Paul Nash and Edward Johnston as visiting lecturers. In due course, those students who built successful careers were invited back to the college to lecture.

=== Writer ===
Rothenstein wrote several critical books and pamphlets, including Goya (1900; the first English monograph on the artist), A Plea for a Wider Use of Artists & Craftsmen (1916) and Whither Painting (1932). During the 1930s he published three volumes of memoirs: Men and Memories, Vol I and II and Since Fifty. Men and Memories Volume I includes anecdotes about Oscar Wilde and many other friends of Rothenstein's, including Max Beerbohm, James Whistler, Paul Verlaine, Edgar Degas, and John Singer Sargent.

== Recognition ==
Rothenstein was knighted in the New Year Honours in 1931. Rabindranath Tagore, a Nobel Prize winner, dedicated his famous poetry collection Gitanjali to William Rothenstein.

In 2011 the BBC and the Public Catalogue Foundation began cataloguing all of his paintings in public ownership online.
