= Max Beerbohm =

English writer and caricaturist (1872–1956)

Sir Max Beerbohm
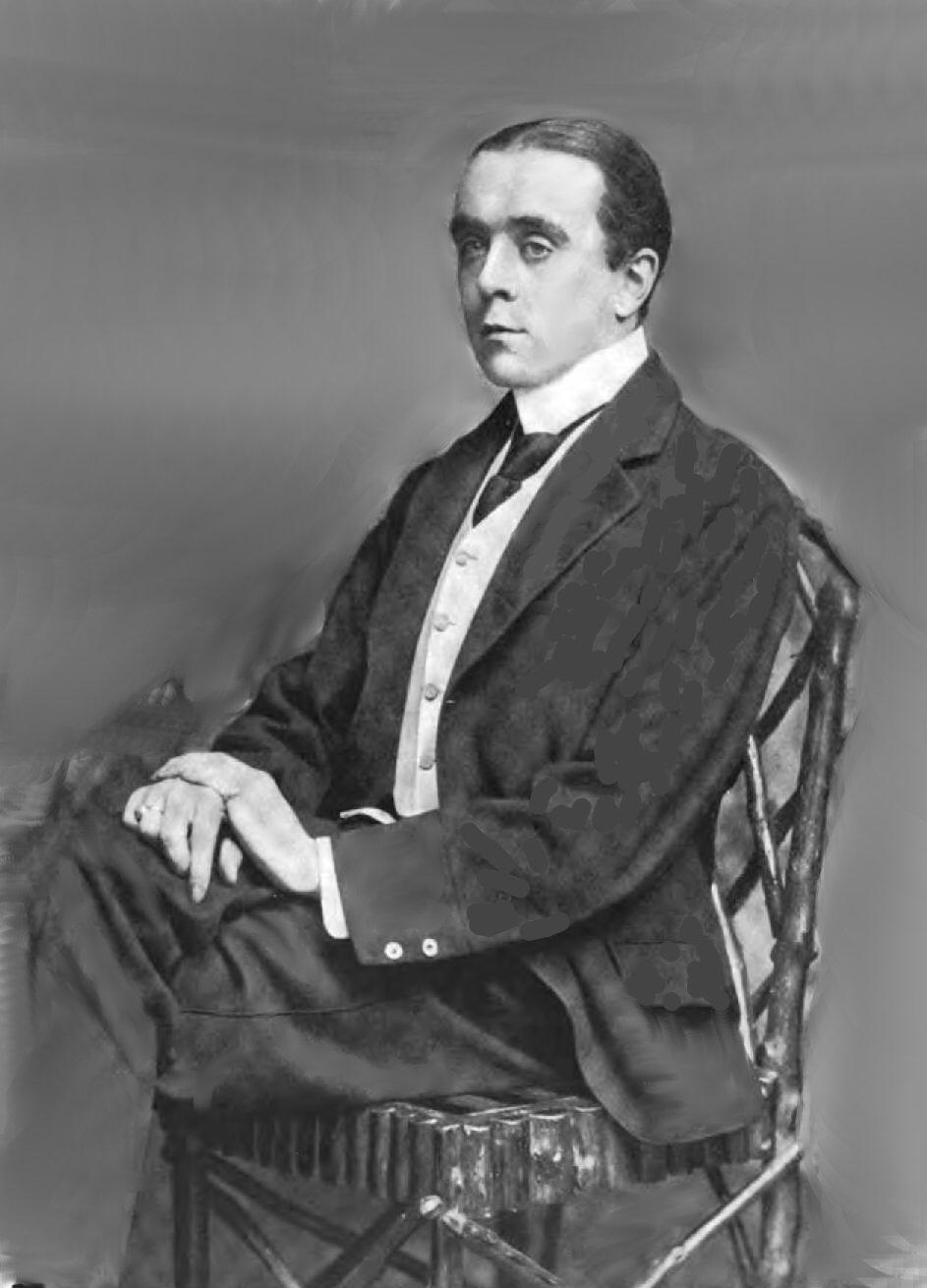
- From The Critic 1901
- Born: Henry Maximilian Beerbohm; 24 August 1872; London, England
- Died: 20 May 1956 (aged 83); Rapallo, Italy
- Resting place: St. Paul's Cathedral
- Occupations: Essayist, parodist, caricaturist
- Spouse(s): Florence Kahn (m. 1910; died 1951); Elisabeth Jungmann (m. 1956)

Sir Henry Maximilian Beerbohm (24 August 1872 – 20 May 1956) was an English essayist, parodist and caricaturist under the signature Max. He first became known in the 1890s as a dandy and a humorist. He was the drama critic for the Saturday Review from 1898 until 1910, when he relocated to Rapallo, Italy. In his later years he was popular for his occasional radio broadcasts. Among his best-known works is his only novel, Zuleika Dobson, published in 1911. His caricatures, drawn usually in pen or pencil with muted watercolour tinting, are in many public collections.

== Early life ==
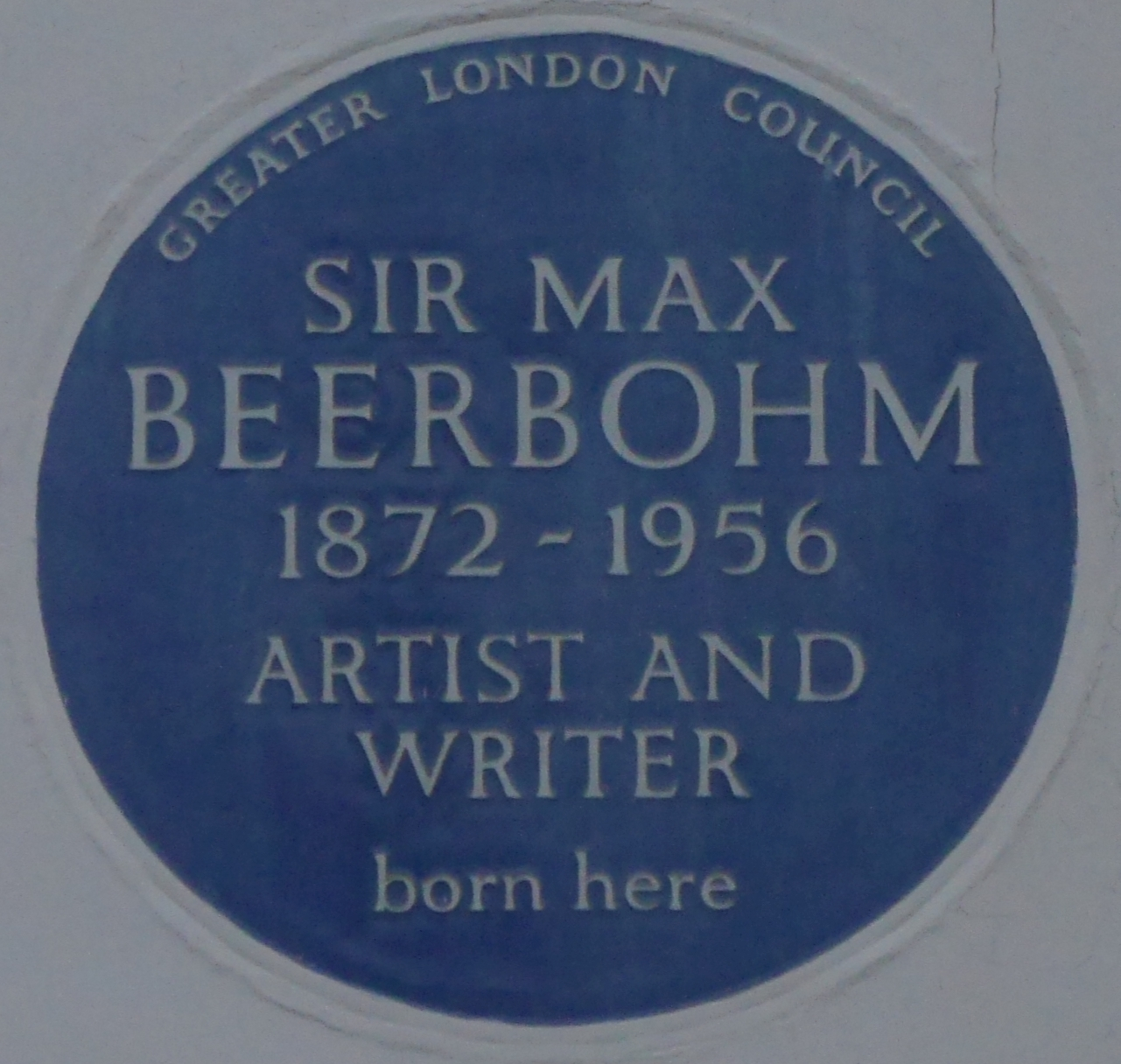
Blue plaque at 57 Palace Gardens Terrace, Kensington, London

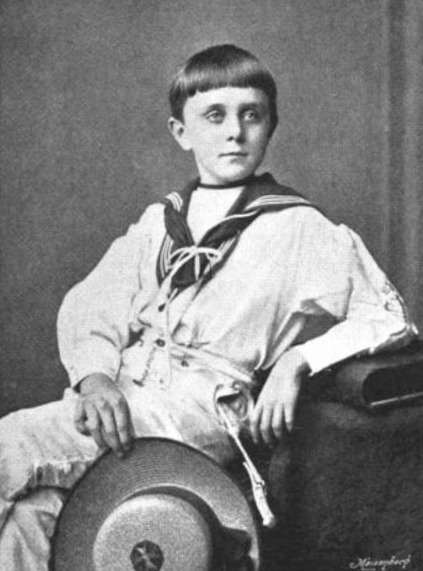
Beerbohm as a child

Born in 57 Palace Gardens Terrace, London which is now marked with a blue plaque, Henry Maximilian Beerbohm was the youngest of nine children of a Lithuanian-born grain merchant of Dutch and German ancestry, Julius Ewald Edward Beerbohm (1811–1892). His mother was Englishwoman Eliza Draper Beerbohm (c. 1833–1918), the sister of Julius's late first wife. Although the Beerbohms were supposed by some in Britain to be of Jewish descent, on looking into the question in his later years Beerbohm told a biographer:

I should be delighted to know that we Beerbohms have that very admirable and engaging thing, Jewish blood. But there seems to be no reason for supposing that we have. Our family records go back as far as 1668, and there is nothing in them compatible with Judaism.

Beerbohm was close to four half-siblings, one of whom, Herbert Beerbohm Tree, was already a renowned stage actor when Max was a child. Other older half-siblings were the author and explorer Julius Beerbohm and the author Constance Beerbohm. His nieces were Viola, Felicity, and Iris Tree.

Max Beerbohm, self-caricature (1897)

From 1881 to 1885, Max – he was always called simply "Max" and it is thus that he signed his drawings – attended the day school of a Mr Wilkinson in Orme Square. Wilkinson, Beerbohm later said, "gave me my love of Latin and thereby enabled me to write English". Mrs Wilkinson taught drawing to the students, the only lessons Beerbohm ever had in the subject.

Beerbohm was educated at Charterhouse School and Merton College, Oxford, from 1890, where he was Secretary of the Myrmidon Club. It was at school that he began writing. While at Oxford Beerbohm became acquainted with Oscar Wilde and his circle through his half-brother, Herbert Beerbohm Tree. In 1893, he met William Rothenstein, who introduced him to Aubrey Beardsley and other members of the literary and artistic circle connected with The Bodley Head.

Although he was an unenthusiastic student academically, Beerbohm became a well-known figure in Oxford social circles. He also began submitting articles and caricatures to London publications, which were met enthusiastically. "I was a modest, good-humoured boy", he recalled. "It was Oxford that has made me insufferable." In March 1893, he submitted an article on Oscar Wilde to the Anglo-American Times under the pen name "An American". Later in 1893 his essay "The Incomparable Beauty of Modern Dress" was published in the Oxford journal The Spirit Lamp by its editor, Lord Alfred Douglas.

By 1894, having developed his personality as a dandy and humourist, and already a rising star in English letters, he left Oxford without a degree. His A Defence of Cosmetics (The Pervasion of Rouge) appeared in the first edition of The Yellow Book in 1894, his friend Aubrey Beardsley being art editor at the time. At this time Wilde said of him, "The gods have bestowed on Max the gift of perpetual old age."

In 1895, Beerbohm went to the United States for several months as secretary to his half-brother Herbert Beerbohm Tree's theatrical company. He was fired when he spent far too many hours polishing the business correspondence.

== Writer and broadcaster ==
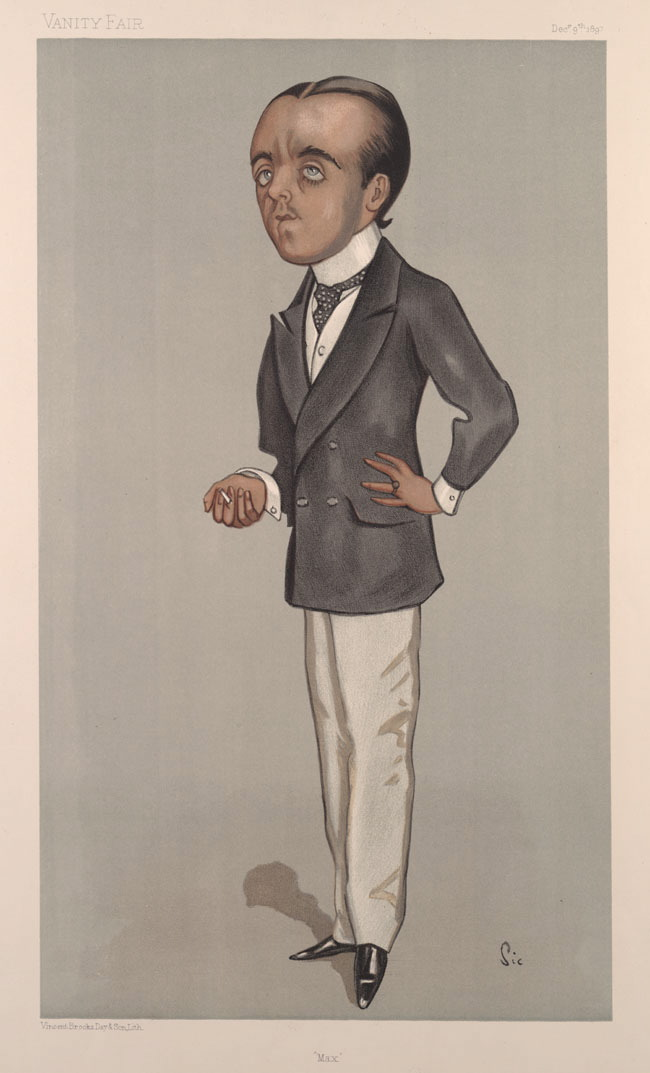
Beerbohm caricatured by Walter Sickert in Vanity Fair (1897)

On his return to England Beerbohm published his first book, The Works of Max Beerbohm (1896), a collection of his essays which had first appeared in The Yellow Book. His first piece of fiction, The Happy Hypocrite, was published in volume XI of The Yellow Book in October 1896. Having been interviewed by George Bernard Shaw himself, in 1898 he followed Shaw as drama critic for the Saturday Review, on whose staff he remained until 1910. At that time the Saturday Review was undergoing renewed popularity under its new owner, the writer Frank Harris, who would later become a close friend of Beerbohm's.

It was Shaw, in his final Saturday Review piece, who bestowed upon Beerbohm the lasting epithet, "the Incomparable Max" when he wrote, "The younger generation is knocking at the door; and as I open it there steps spritely in the incomparable Max".

In 1904 Beerbohm met the American actress Florence Kahn. In 1910 they married and moved to Rapallo in Italy, partly as an escape from the social demands and the expense of living in London. Here they remained for the rest of their lives except for the duration of World War I and World War II, when they returned to Britain, and occasional trips to England to take part in exhibitions of his drawings.

Beerbohm and his wife Florence spent the period of the First World War (1914 to 1918) in a cottage belonging to William Rothenstein, next to Rothenstein's own residence Iles Farm, in Far Oakridge, Gloucestershire. The Arts and Crafts architect Norman Jewson remarked on his dapper appearance there: "At first it amazed me to see him, in the depths of the country, in war time, always perfectly groomed and immaculately dressed as if for a garden party at Buckingham Palace, but as I got to know him better I realised that he just could not do anything else."

In his years in Rapallo Beerbohm was visited by many of the eminent men and women of his day, including Ezra Pound, who lived nearby, Somerset Maugham, John Gielgud, Laurence Olivier and Truman Capote among others. Beerbohm never learned to speak Italian in the five decades that he lived in Italy.

From 1935 onwards, he was an occasional though popular radio broadcaster, talking on cars and carriages and music halls for the BBC. His radio talks were published in 1946 as Mainly on the Air. His wit is shown often enough in his caricatures but his letters contain a carefully blended humour – a gentle admonishing of the excesses of the day – whilst remaining firmly tongue in cheek. His lifelong friend Reginald Turner, who was also an aesthete and a somewhat witty companion, saved many of Beerbohm's letters.

Beerbohm's best-known works include A Christmas Garland (1912), a parody of literary styles, Seven Men (1919), which includes "Enoch Soames", the tale of a poet who makes a deal with the Devil to find out how posterity will remember him, and Zuleika Dobson (1911), a satire of undergraduate life at Oxford. This was his only novel, but was nonetheless very successful.

== Caricaturist ==
'Club Types' in The Strand Magazine Vol. 4 (1892)

Oscar Wilde caricatured in Rossetti and His Circle (1916)

In the 1890s, while a student at Oxford University, Beerbohm showed great skill at observant figure sketching. His usual style of single-figure caricatures on formalised groupings, drawn in pen or pencil with delicately applied watercolour tinting, was established by 1896 and flourished until about 1930. In contrast to the heavier artistic style of the Punch tradition, he showed a lightness of touch and simplicity of line. Beerbohm's career as a professional caricaturist began when he was twenty: in 1892 The Strand Magazine published thirty-six of his drawings of 'Club Types'. Their publication dealt, Beerbohm said, "a great, an almost mortal blow to my modesty". The first public exhibition of his caricatures was as part of a group show at the Fine Art Society in 1896; his first one-man show at the Carfax Gallery in 1901. Explaining his system for caricature, Beerbohm wrote: "The whole man must be melted down in a crucible and then, from the solution, fashioned anew. Nothing will be lost but no particle will be as it was before." He concluded: "The most perfect caricature is that which, on a small surface, with the simplest means, most accurately exaggerates, to the highest point, the peculiarities of a human being, at his most characteristic moment, in the most beautiful manner."

Beerbohm was influenced by French cartoonists such as "Sem" (Georges Goursat) and "Caran d'Ache" (Emmanuel Poiré). He was hailed by The Times in 1913 as "the greatest of English comic artists", by Bernard Berenson as "the English Goya", and by Edmund Wilson as "the greatest ... portrayer of personalities – in the history of art".

Usually inept with hands and feet, Beerbohm excelled in heads and with dandified male costume of a period whose elegance became a source of nostalgic inspiration. His collections of caricatures included Caricatures of Twenty-five Gentlemen (1896), The Poets' Corner (1904), Fifty Caricatures (1913) and Rossetti and His Circle (1922). His caricatures were published widely in the fashionable magazines of the time, and his works were exhibited regularly in London at the Carfax Gallery (1901–08) and Leicester Galleries (1911–57). At his Rapallo home he drew and wrote infrequently and decorated books in his library. These were sold at auction by Sotheby's of London on 12 and 13 December 1960 following the death of his second wife and literary executor Elisabeth Jungmann.

His Rapallo caricatures were mostly of late Victorian and Edwardian political, literary and theatrical personalities. The court of Edward VII had a special place as a subject for affectionate ridicule. Many of Beerbohm's later caricatures were of himself.

Major collections of Beerbohm's caricatures are in the Ashmolean Museum, Oxford; the Tate collection; the Victoria and Albert Museum; Charterhouse School; the Clark Library, University of California; and the Lilly Library, Indiana University; depositories of both caricatures and archival material include Merton College, Oxford; the Harry Ransom Center, University of Texas at Austin; Princeton University Library; the Houghton Library, Harvard University; and the privately owned Mark Samuels Lasner collection.

== Personal life ==
Beerbohm in his later years. As a young man in 1894 Oscar Wilde had said of him, "The gods have bestowed on Max the gift of perpetual old age."

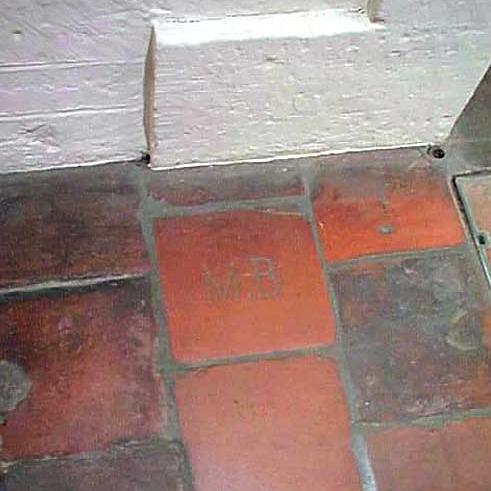
Beerbohm's ashes are interred in St Paul's Cathedral under the tile marked "MB"

Beerbohm married the actress Florence Kahn in 1910. There has been speculation that he was a non-active homosexual (Malcolm Muggeridge, who much disliked him, imputed homosexuality to him), that his marriage was never consummated, that he was a "natural celibate" or even just asexual.

David Cecil wrote that, "though he showed no moral disapproval of homosexuality, [Beerbohm] was not disposed to it himself; on the contrary he looked upon it as a great misfortune to be avoided if possible." Cecil quotes a letter from Beerbohm to Oscar Wilde's friend Robert Ross in which he asks Ross to keep Reggie Turner from the clutches of Lord Alfred Douglas, "I really think Reg is at a rather crucial point of his career – and should hate to see him fall an entire victim to the love that dare not tell its name." The fact is that not much is known of Beerbohm's private life.

Evelyn Waugh also speculated that Beerbohm had made a mariage blanc but added: "Beerbohm remarked of Ruskin that it was surprising he should marry, without knowing he was impotent." Waugh also observed, "the question is of little importance in an artist of Beerbohm's quality."

There was also some speculation during his lifetime that Beerbohm was Jewish. Muggeridge assumed that Beerbohm's Jewishness was certain. Beerbohm responded by saying that, disappointingly for him, he was not. However, both of his wives were Jews of German origin, although Florence was born and reared in Memphis, Tennessee, in an immigrant family. She is described as an American.

When asked by George Bernard Shaw if he had any Jewish ancestors, Beerbohm replied: "That my talent is rather like Jewish talent I admit readily... But, being in fact a Gentile, I am, in a small way, rather remarkable, and wish to remain so." In his poem Hugh Selwyn Mauberley, Ezra Pound, a neighbour in Rapallo – and later a supporter of fascism and anti-Semitism – caricatured Beerbohm as "Brennbaum", a Jewish artist.

== The Maximilian Society ==
Beerbohm was knighted by George VI in 1939; it was thought that this mark of esteem had been delayed by his mockery in 1911 of the king's parents, about whom he had written a satiric verse, "Ballade Tragique a Double Refrain". In August 1942, on the occasion of Beerbohm's seventieth birthday, the Maximilian Society was created by a London drama critic in his honour. It had seventy distinguished male members, including J. B. Priestley, Walter de la Mare, Augustus John, William Rothenstein, Edward Lutyens, Osbert Lancaster, Siegfried Sassoon, Osbert Sitwell, Leonard Woolf, John Betjeman, Kenneth Clark, E. M. Forster, Graham Greene, and Laurence Housman, and planned to add one more member on each of Beerbohm's successive birthdays. At their first meeting, a banquet was held in his honour, and he was presented with seventy bottles of wine.

== Death ==
Beerbohm died on 20 May 1956 at the Villa Chiara, a private hospital in Rapallo, Italy, aged 83, shortly after marrying his former secretary and companion, Elisabeth Jungmann. Beerbohm was cremated in Genoa and his ashes were interred in the crypt of St. Paul's Cathedral, London, on 29 June 1956.

A relation is the American comic book historian Robert Beerbohm (1952–2024).

== Bibliography ==
=== Written works ===
- The Works of Max Beerbohm, with a Bibliography by John Lane (1896)
- A Defence of Cosmetics (1896)
- The Happy Hypocrite (1897)
- More (1899)
- Yet Again (1909)
- Zuleika Dobson; or, An Oxford Love Story (1911)
- A Christmas Garland, Woven by Max Beerbohm (1912)
- Seven Men (1919; enlarged edition as Seven Men and Two Others, 1950)
- Herbert Beerbohm Tree: Some Memories of Him and of His Art (1920, ed. Max Beerbohm)
- And Even Now (1920)
- A Peep into the Past (1923)
- Catalogue of an Exhibition of Caricatures by ″Quiz″ [Powys Evans] With an Introductory Note by Mr. Max Beerbohm (1923)
- Around Theatres (1924)
- A Variety of Things (1928)
- The Dreadful Dragon of Hay Hill (1928)
- Lytton Strachey (1943) Rede Lecture
- Mainly on the Air (1946; enlarged edition 1957)
- The Incomparable Max: A Collection of Writings of Sir Max Beerbohm (1962)
- Max in Verse: Rhymes and Parodies (1963, ed. J. G. Riewald)
- Letters to Reggie Turner (1964, ed. Rupert Hart-Davis)
- More Theatres, 1898–1903 (1969, ed. Rupert Hart-Davis)
- Selected Prose (1970, ed. by Lord David Cecil)
- Max and Will: Max Beerbohm and William Rothenstein: Their Friendship and Letters (1975, eds Mary M. Lago and Karl Beckson)
- Letters of Max Beerbohm: 1892–1956 (1988, ed. Rupert Hart-Davis)
- Last Theatres, 1904–1910 (1970, ed. Rupert Hart-Davis)
- A Peep into the Past and Other Prose Pieces (1972)
- Max Beerbohm and "The Mirror of the Past" (1982, ed. Lawrence Danson)
- Collected Verse (1994, ed. J. G. Riewald)

=== Collections of caricatures ===
'Dante Gabriel Rossetti in His Back-Garden' from The Poets' Corner (1904)

- Caricatures of Twenty-five Gentlemen (1896)
- The Poets' Corner (1904)
- A Book of Caricatures (1907)
- Cartoons: The Second Childhood of John Bull (1911)
- Fifty Caricatures (1913)
- A Survey (1921)
- Rossetti and His Circle (1922)
- Things New and Old (1923)
- Observations (1925)
- Heroes and Heroines of Bitter Sweet (1931) five drawings in a portfolio
- Max's Nineties: Drawings 1892–1899 (1958, ed. Rupert Hart-Davis and Allan Wade)
- Beerbohm's Literary Caricatures: From Homer to Huxley (1977, ed. J. G. Riewald)
- Max Beerbohm Caricatures (1997, ed. N. John Hall)
- Enoch Soames: A Critical Heritage (1997)

== See also ==
- Beerbohm family
