= The Lone Wolf in London =

1947 film by Leslie Goodwins

- Directed by: Leslie Goodwins
- Written by: Brenda Weisberg; Arthur E. Orloff
- Screenplay by: Arthur E. Orloff; Louis Joseph Vance
- Based on: Lone Wolf by Louis Joseph Vance
- Produced by: Robert Cohn; Ted Richmond
- Starring: Gerald Mohr; Nancy Saunders; Eric Blore; Evelyn Ankers
- Cinematography: Henry Freulich
- Edited by: Henry Batista
- Music by: Mischa Bakaleinikoff
- Production company: Columbia Pictures
- Distributed by: Columbia Pictures
- Release date: November 13, 1947
- Running time: 68 minutes
- Country: United States
- Language: English

The Lone Wolf in London is a 1947 American mystery crime film directed by Leslie Goodwins and starring Gerald Mohr, Nancy Saunders and Eric Blore. The picture features the fictional Scotland Yard detective the Lone Wolf who travels to London, and solves the mystery of some missing jewels. It was the penultimate Lone Wolf film, followed by The Lone Wolf and His Lady in 1949, and the last for Mohr in the lead role.

== Plot ==
In 1947, Inspector Garvey of Scotland Yard suspects Michael Lanyard, the reformed jewel thief known as the "Lone Wolf," is behind the theft of the priceless diamonds called the "Eyes of the Nile". Lanyard denies any involvement claiming that he is in London with his butler, Claudius Jamison to write a book on the jewels and was in New York when they were stolen.

Lanyard and Jamison are short of funds and when Ann Kelmscott, the daughter of wealthy gem collector Sir John Kelmscott, invites them to the family estate, they agree. Sir John confides that he is in desperate need of money and asks Lanyard to arrange a confidential loan with part of his jewel collection as collateral. Jamison tells his master that Lily, the maid, told him the butler, Henry Robards, is heartbroken because his former wife, actress Iris Chatham, has run off with Monty Beresford who financed the lavish stage production that launched Iris to stardom.

Back at his hotel, Lanyard receives a call from Iris, inviting him to the theater that night where she asks him to stay away from the Kelmscotts. At her apartment, Robards begs her for a reconciliation, but she demands something first. Lanyard decides to accept Kelmscott's offer and arranges to meet Bruce Tang, a gem dealer the next morning. Kelmscott gives Robards a packet of jewels to deliver to Lanyard but he steals the Eyes of the Nile for Iris. David Woolerton, Ann's fiancé, asks him for a ride because he wants to spy on Lanyard. At Tang's shop, Inspector Garvey has followed Lanyard. When Robards' car rolls to a stop, the butler is dead behind the wheel, the jewels still in his possession but the Eyes of the Nile are gone. Woolerton claims Robards pushed him out of the car on the outskirts, and said he suspects Lanyard was the murderer.

Lanyard thinks Kelmscott was being blackmailed by the thief who sold him the diamonds, and flees the police and proceeds to Iris' apartment. She has just persuaded Monty to get the diamonds from Lanyard. Lanyard and Monty struggle with Monty being subdued and told that Iris was about to flee with the famous Lone Wolf. At the theater, Lanyard discovers the diamonds are sewn into her mink coat but before he can leave her dressing room, Iris enters and admits that Robards had given her the diamonds. While Lanyard phones Jamison, Iris sneaks out an open window and heads to the airport to catch a flight out of the country.

At the airport, Lanyard confronts Iris and turns her over to the waiting Garvey but Monty arrives, wielding a gun and declaring Iris planned the entire robbery and then killed Robards for the diamonds. When Jamison brings Lily and Iris' mink, Lanyard extracts the Eyes of the Nile from the coat's linings, proving that Iris was the thief and murderer.

== Cast ==
- Gerald Mohr as Michael Lanyard
- Nancy Saunders as Ann Klemscott
- Eric Blore as Claudius Jamison (Note: In Passport to Suez (1943), Jamison's first name was Llewellyn.)
- Evelyn Ankers as Iris Chatham
- Richard Fraser as David Woolerton
- Queenie Leonard as Lily, Kelmscott's Maid
- Denis Green as Detective Inspector Garvey
- Alan Napier as Monty Beresford
- Frederick Worlock as Inspector Broome
- Tom Stevenson as Henry Robards, Kemscott's Butler
- Vernon Steele as Sir John Klemscott
- Paul Fung as Bruce Tang
- Guy Kingsford as Detective Mitchum
- Charles Coleman as Cabby
- Sam Harris as Airline Ticket Holder
- James Logan as Airport Policeman
- Frank O'Connor as Airport Security Guard
- Heather Wilde as Hotel Maid

== Production ==
The Lone Wolf in London was directed by Leslie Goodwins and was written by Brenda Weisberg and Arthur E. Orloff Gerald Mohr was signed by Columbia Pictures to play the lead character in three films in the popular series: The Notorious Lone Wolf (1946) and The Lone Wolf in Mexico (1947), as well as The Lone Wolf in London. The Lone Wolf in London marked the last Lone Wolf film in which Mohr starred as the title character. The film was followed up with The Lone Wolf and His Lady (1949) with a new lead actor, Ron Randell, after which Columbia decided to bring an end to the film series. Principal photography commenced on May 19, 1946, and finished on May 29, 1947, taking place in studio settings at Columbia Pictures Corporation.

== Reception ==
The Lone Wolf in London was theatrically released in the United States on November 13, 1947. The film was predictable B-movie fare at the box office but mainly relegated to the second feature in a double bill. Film critic Bosley Crowther did not even review the film, merely mentioning it in passing as appearing at the same time as The Lost Moment (1947).
