= The Lone Wolf in Mexico =

1947 film by D. Ross Lederman

- Theatrical release poster
- Directed by: D. Ross Lederman
- Written by: Maurice Tombragel; Martin Goldsmith
- Screenplay by: Martin Goldsmith; Maurice Tombragel
- Story by: Phil Magee
- Based on: Story by Phil Magee
- Produced by: Sanford Cummings
- Starring: Gerald Mohr; Eric Blore
- Cinematography: Allen G. Siegler
- Edited by: William Lyon
- Music by: Mischa Bakaleinikoff
- Production company: Columbia Pictures
- Distributed by: Columbia Pictures
- Release date: January 16, 1947 (United States)
- Running time: 69 minutes
- Country: United States
- Language: English

The Lone Wolf in Mexico is a 1947 American black-and-white mystery-adventure film directed by D. Ross Lederman for Columbia Pictures. It features Gerald Mohr as the title character, detective Lone Wolf. Chronologically the third-to-last Lone Wolf film in Columbia's theatrical series, it was followed by The Lone Wolf in London later in 1947 and The Lone Wolf and His Lady in 1949.

== Plot ==
Former jewel thief Michael Lanyard (The Lone Wolf) (Gerald Mohr) along with his butler, Jamison (Eric Blore), go to Mexico on vacation. Lanyard, once a thief has been working as a private investigator. Liliane Dumont (Jacqueline deWit), one of the Lone Wolf's old flames, and Mrs. Van Weir (Winifred Harris) invite Lanyard and Jamison to dinner at Henderson's (John Gallaudet) El Paseo nightclub . They meet Sharon Montgomery (Sheila Ryan), a jeweller's spouse and gambling addict, who has lost a fortune at the casino.

Leon Dumont (Bernard Nedell), deWit's husband, tries to enlist Lanyard in a jewel theft. Jamison takes Montgomery home, but when he is not looking, she slips a valuable compact into his coat pocket. After the Lone Wolf steals a necklace, he discovers it is a fake and replaces it in the nightclub safe.

When Dumont is murdered, Montgomery accuses Lanyard of the murder and Jamison of stealing her compact. Mrs. Van Weir is also heavily in debt with Henderson demanding her precious necklace to clear her gambling losses. Montgomery blackmails Henderson and tries to warn Lanyard but is also murdered, leaving him no alternative, he must track down the criminal mastermind behind the murders.

Mrs. Van Weir plots with Henderson but her worthless necklace is what gives her away and Lanyard calls in the police to bring Henderson and Van Weir, the real murderer to justice.

== Cast ==
- Gerald Mohr as Michael Lanyard
- Sheila Ryan as Sharon Montgomery
- Jacqueline deWit as Liliane Dumont
- Eric Blore as Jamison
- Nestor Paiva as Carlos Rodriguez
- John Gallaudet as Henderson
- Bernard Nedell as Leon Dumont
- Winifred Harris as Mrs. Van Weir
- Peter Brocco as Emil
- Alan Edwards as Charles Montgomery
- Fred Godoy as Captain Mendez
- Jose Portugal as Policeman

== Production ==
The Lone Wolf in Mexico was directed by D. Ross Lederman and was written by Martin Goldsmith, Maurice Tombragel and Phil Magee. After a sickly Warren Williams decided to discontinue playing the title detective Michael Landyard, also known as Lone Wolf, Gerald Mohr was roped in by Columbia Pictures, the producer and the distributor, to play the character in The Notorious Lone Wolf (1946) and The Lone Wolf in London (1947), as well as The Lone Wolf in Mexico. The Lone Wolf in Mexico marked the penultimate Lone Wolf film in which Mohr starred as the title character. Principal photography with the working title of The Lone Wolf's Invitation to Murder, commenced on September 4, 1946, and finished on September 18, 1946, taking place in Mexico.

== Reception ==
The Lone Wolf in Mexico was theatrically released in the United States on January 16, 1947. It was written to be a "hit" at the box office. The film was still screening in American cinemas up till at least July 21, 1947. It was followed up with The Lone Wolf in London (1947) and The Lone Wolf and His Lady (1949), after which Columbia decided to bring an end to the film series. The Blockbusters Entertainment Guide to Movies and Videos 1999 found the film to be only "so-so".
