= Robert Thom (writer) =

American writer, Rhodes Scholar (1929–1979)

Robert Thom (July 2, 1929 – May 8, 1979) was an American writer of films, plays, novels and poems. He is best known for writing the screenplay for Death Race 2000 (1975), produced by Roger Corman's New World and directed by Paul Bartel.

== Early life ==
Born Robert Thom in Brooklyn, New York, to mother Lily Pendlebury, he had a sister. Thom graduated from Yale University as a promising poet in 1952 and became a Rhodes Scholar. He studied in Oxford for a year.

== Career ==
He sold his first play, The Minotaur, to the Circle in the Square Theatre producers, José Quintero, Ted Mann, Emilie Stevens and Jason Wingreen, in 1954. He continued and succeeded in establishing himself as a young playwriting talent in the New York City theater scene.

In 1957, he came to Broadway to work on Compulsion, based on the book and play by Meyer Levin about the Leopold and Loeb case. It starred Roddy McDowall and Dean Stockwell and ran for 140 performances. Thom was credited only as an assistant to the producers and received 20% of Levin's royalties. He later worked on the screenplay for the 1959 film version starring Orson Welles.

Thom moved to the West Coast to work for MGM and wrote screenplays for such youth films as The Subterraneans, based on the novel by Jack Kerouac; and All the Fine Young Cannibals, loosely based on a novel by Rosamond Marshall (both released in 1960). He also worked on others for which he was uncredited.

He co-wrote an episode of The DuPont Show of the Week ("The Legend of Lylah Clare" 1963) which was broadcast on NBC. It was later developed as a film of the same name, released in 1968.

A week after the broadcast of the DuPont Show, Thom won an Emmy for Outstanding Writing Achievement in Drama for a two-part episode of the TV series The Defenders called The Madman, starring Sylvia Sidney and Don Gordon.

His play Bicycle Ride to Nevada, starring Franchot Tone, opened on Broadway on September 24, 1963, but closed after one day.

Wild in the Streets, based on a short story written by Thom and originally published in Esquire under the title, "The Day It All Happened, Baby!" was an exploitation film success for American International Pictures in 1968. Thom both wrote and for the first time directed his own film, Angel, Angel, Down We Go, in 1969 for AIP.

He wrote several novels and had just finished Masquerade before his death.

== Personal life ==
Thom was married to actress Joan Zell from 1953 to 1956. She committed suicide at his home in 1961.

He married actress Janice Rule in 1956; the couple had a daughter, Kate, before they divorced in 1961.

Thom married actress Millie Perkins in 1964; they had two daughters, Lillie and Hedy. They were separated at the time of his death in 1979.

Thom, then a resident of New York City, died from a heart attack while staying in a hotel in Malibu, California, at age 49.

== Selected theatre credits ==
- The Minotaur (1954)
- Sailing to Byzantium
- Compulsion (1957)
- Bicycle Ride to Nevada (1963)

== Selected Poems ==
- Children of Ladybug
- Vaticum

== Selected film credits ==
- Compulsion (1959)
- The Subterraneans (1960)
- All the Fine Young Cannibals (1960)
- Wild in the Streets (1968)
- The Legend of Lylah Clare (1968)
- Angel, Angel, Down We Go (1969) – also directed
- Bloody Mama (1970)
- The Phantom of Hollywood (1974)
- Alias Big Cherry (1975)
- Death Race 2000 (1975)
- Crazy Mama (1975)
- The Witch Who Came from the Sea (1976)
