= Passport to Suez =

1943 film by André de Toth

- Theatrical film poster
- Directed by: Andre de Toth
- Screenplay by: John Stone
- Story by: Alden Nash
- Produced by: Wallace MacDonald
- Starring: Warren William
- Cinematography: L. William O'Connell
- Edited by: Mel Thorsen
- Production company: Columbia Pictures
- Distributed by: Columbia Pictures
- Release date: August 19, 1943
- Running time: 72 minutes
- Country: United States
- Language: English

Passport to Suez (1943; also known as A Night of Adventure and The Clock Strikes Twelve) is the 20th film featuring the Lone Wolf character. It was the eleventh of fifteen in the Columbia Pictures series, and the last to star Warren William as the lead character, a jewel thief turned private detective. The Lone Wolf battles Nazi spies in Egypt in World War II. The character's next film was The Notorious Lone Wolf.

== Plot ==
Michael Lanyard, the Lone Wolf, agrees to go to Alexandria to help the Allied cause during World War II. There, he and his valet, Llewellyn Jamison, are met by his old friend, nightclub owner Johnny Booth.

Fritz comes to drive him, supposedly to see Sir Robert Wembley, head of the British secret service in the region. However, he is actually taken to meet Karl, the leader of a Nazi spy ring. Karl threatens to kill Jamison (whom he has kidnapped) unless Lanyard does some as yet unspecified work for him. When Lanyard reluctantly agrees, the two men are released. After they leave, Karl reveals to Fritz that he expects the Lone Wolf to try to trap him, but that is all part of his plan. When Lanyard meets with Wembley, the spymaster makes clear that he does not want an amateur's help, but reluctantly agrees to let the Lone Wolf play along in order to gather more information.

Complicating matters further, Lanyard and Jamison encounter the latter's son Donald, a British naval officer, and his fiancée, reporter Valerie King in Booth's nightclub. Lanyard soon suspects that she is not all she appears to be. In Booth's private office, he also re-encounters freelance spy or informant "Rembrandt" and meets a new one calling himself "Cezanne" (both more or less on friendly terms with Booth). Cézanne shows him that the lace King was knitting contains a secret message. When the two spies leave, Rembrandt shoots Cézanne; he dies in front of the nightclub, at King's feet.

When King returns to her hotel room, Karl is waiting for her. She is one of his agents, currently extracting information from Donald for their real goal: the plans for the minefields and defences of the Suez Canal.

Meanwhile, the Lone Wolf is approached by "Whistler", yet another unscrupulous man with information to sell. Whistler sells him the lace that King had sent to a laundry; the hidden message indicates that whatever the Nazis plan to do is to be finished by midnight.

Karl gives Lanyard his assignment: break into a safe at British Intelligence and steal some documents. However, it eventually becomes clear to all that Lanyard's part is merely a distraction. The plans have already been stolen. Wembley orders the arrest of the Lone Wolf for treason, but Lanyard escapes.

He and Jamison head for the laundry. Along the way, they come upon the unconscious Donald. They revive him and take him along. Inside, they find secret rooms and overpower Fritz. They also discover the body of Whistler and a clue, shards of a distinctive watch crystal, just like the one King has, microfilming equipment, and ashes of the defence plans. Lanyard deduces that the plans have been copied to King's watch crystal. When she telephones, Lanyard pretends to be Karl and learns that she is at the hotel. Before they get there, however, Rembrandt kills her and takes the watch to Karl.

Fortunately, Booth has access to a biplane armed with machine guns. Lanyard pilots it, finds the speeding car taking Karl and Rembrandt to the submarine, and strafes them. The car crashes, putting Karl and Rembrandt out of commission, possibly dead, and the watch smashed.

== Cast ==
- Warren William as Michael Lanyard, the Lone Wolf
- Ann Savage as Valerie King
- Eric Blore as Llewellyn Jamison (Note: In The Lone Wolf in London Jamison's first name was Claudius.)
- Robert Stanford as Donald Jamison
- Sheldon Leonard as Johnny Booth
- Lloyd Bridges as Fritz
- Gavin Muir as Karl

== Production ==
Principal photography under the working titles of A Night of Adventure and The Clock Strikes Twelve, took place from April 29 to May 18, 1943. The "Lone Wolf" title character was played by Warren William in his last of nine films in which he portrayed the jewel thief turned private detective, a character created by Louis Joseph Vance (1879–1933) in a series of eight novels published between 1914 and 1934. Eric Blore continued playing Lanyard's butler "Jameson."

Director Andre de Toth who was a staple in B-movies of the 1940s, provided his typical treatment. "His most enduring legacy, especially to later directors and film students, was a series of superb B movies – mostly westerns and crime dramas that he made in the late 1940s and 1950s. They were gritty, psychologically acute and unflinchingly violent." Henry Levin was a dialogue director.

== Reception ==
The Los Angeles Board of Review of the War Review Board disapproved the export of Passport to Suez this because the film portrayed British Intelligence as ineffectual and naive.

Film historian Leonard Maltin considered Passport to Suez as a worthy addition to the "Lone Wolf" series: "Nazi spies lead sleuth William on a wild goose chase as part of a plan to blow up the Suez Canal in this well-made Lone Wolf entry with more comedy relief from Blore than usual."
