= The Cockeyed Miracle =

1946 film by S. Sylvan Simon

- Directed by: S. Sylvan Simon
- Screenplay by: Karen DeWolf
- Based on: But Not Goodbye; 1944 play by George Seaton
- Produced by: Irving Starr
- Starring: Frank Morgan; Keenan Wynn; Cecil Kellaway
- Cinematography: Ray June
- Edited by: Ben Lewis
- Music by: David Snell
- Production company: Metro-Goldwyn-Mayer
- Distributed by: Loew's Inc.
- Release date: October 24, 1946
- Running time: 81 minutes
- Country: United States
- Language: English
- Budget: $663,000
- Box office: $846,000

The Cockeyed Miracle is a 1946 American fantasy film directed by S. Sylvan Simon and starring Frank Morgan, Keenan Wynn, and Cecil Kellaway. The film was based on the play But Not Goodbye by George Seaton. The film is about a ghost who, with the help of his father (also a ghost), stops his best friend from leaving his family penniless.

== Plot ==
Aging shipbuilder Sam Griggs (Frank Morgan) is near the end of his career because of health problems. With the help of his friend Tom Carter (Cecil Kellaway), he has invested all of his family's money in a shaky real estate venture which he hopes will provide a large return. The rest of his family is happily unaware of the deal, preoccupied with their own future prospects.

Sam dies and meets the youthful ghost of his father Ben Griggs (Keenan Wynn), eager to shepherd his son into the afterlife. Sam insists on lingering to help his family as best he can, first persuading Ben to use his supernatural power to cause storms to help along a romance between his daughter and an oblivious lodger, and then to aid the success of his investment by impressing the potential buyer.

Having discovered his death and their own financial situation (but not the nature of his venture), Sam's wife Amy (Gladys Cooper) encourages her children to remember their father fondly. Tom arrives at their home to give the grieving family Sam's share, but succumbs to greed after writing the check and attempts to leave without informing them of their new inheritance.

Though Sam invisibly berates his faithless friend, he and his father seem helpless to prevent the betrayal. However, one last storm cast by Ben leads to Tom dying from a lightning strike. Knowing that the authorities will find the check on his body, Sam and Ben finally leave for the afterlife with Tom in tow.

== Cast ==
- Frank Morgan as Sam Griggs
- Keenan Wynn as Ben Griggs
- Cecil Kellaway as Tom Carter
- Audrey Totter as Jennifer Griggs
- Richard Quine as Howard Bankson
- Gladys Cooper as Amy Griggs
- Marshall Thompson as Jim Griggs
- Leon Ames as Ralph Humphrey
- Jane Green as Mrs. Lynne
- Morris Ankrum as Dr. Wilson
- Arthur Space as Amos Spellman

== Reception ==
The film earned $619,000 in the U.S. and Canada and $227,000 in other markets, resulting in a whopping loss of $182,000.
