= One Dangerous Night =

1943 film by Michael Gordon

- Theatrical release poster
- Directed by: Michael Gordon
- Screenplay by: Donald Davis
- Story by: Max Nosseck; Arnold Lippschitz
- Based on: Lone Wolf by Louis Joseph Vance
- Produced by: David Chatkin
- Starring: Warren William; Eric Blore; Marguerite Chapman; Tala Birell; Margaret Hayes; Mona Barrie; Ann Savage; Warren Ashe
- Cinematography: L. William O'Connell
- Edited by: Viola Lawrence
- Production company: Columbia Pictures
- Release date: January 22, 1943
- Running time: 77 minutes
- Country: United States
- Language: English

One Dangerous Night (1943) (also known as The Lone Wolf Goes to a Party) is the tenth Lone Wolf film produced by Columbia Pictures. It features Warren William in his seventh and second-to-last performance as the protagonist jewel thief turned detective the Lone Wolf, and Warren Ashe as Sidney Shaw, the film's antagonist. The film was directed by Michael Gordon and written by Arnold Lippschitz, Max Nosseck, and Donald Davis.

One Dangerous Night centres on former jewel thief Michael Lanyard, also known by his alias "Lone Wolf", aiming to clear his name after he is accused of murdering a jewel smuggler. Filming took place in September 1942. One Dangerous Night was theatrically released in the United States on January 22, 1943. The film was followed by Passport to Suez, released later the same year.

== Plot ==
Former jewel thief and reformed detective Michael Lanyard, or the Lone Wolf, is driving to a party with his butler Jamison. Halfway through the journey, they come across Eve Andrews, who requests that they take her to Harry Cooper's residence. Meanwhile, Cooper, an unprofessed criminal, is carrying out a scheme to loot the jewelry of select wealthy persons — namely, Jane Merrick, Sonia Budenny and Andrews. Cooper is killed before he can finish his plans by an unknown assailant. Lanyard, who happens to be at the scene, is pinpointed by the suspicious police as the perpetrator. He escapes but is found by magazine writer Sidney Shaw, who agrees not to rat Lanyard out in exchange for a scoop.

The Lone Wolf interrogates the women at the murder scene but is unable to find a lead. He is then captured by two criminals working under Arthur, Cooper's right-hand man. Lanyard breaks free and flees, reuniting with Jamison and Shaw. The trio sneak into Cooper's house and decide to tail Arthur, who is leaving for the airport. The criminal turns out to be meeting a teenager named Patricia Blake. Unaware of Cooper's death, she becomes distressed when the news is broken to her.

Arthur and Blake later leave for a hotel. In the middle of his confidence trick on Blake, Arthur is halted by Lanyard, Jamison, and Shaw, who rush into the hotel room. A heated fight ensues, with Arthur managing to escape. Blake injures herself and is quickly attended to by Shaw. When she admits her love for Cooper, Shaw is infuriated. Lanyard realizes that Blake is Shaw's spouse and by piecing two and two together, he concludes that Shaw was Cooper's killer. The police arrive in time to arrest the jealous lover, and the Lone Wolf is exonerated.

== Cast ==
- Warren William as Michael Lanyard, The Lone Wolf
- Marguerite Chapman as Eve Andrews
- Eric Blore as Jamison
- Mona Barrie as Jane Merrick
- Tala Birell as Sonia Beaudine
- Margaret Hayes as Patricia Blake Shannon (listed also as Shaw)
- Ann Savage as Vivian
- Thurston Hall as Inspector Crane
- Warren Ashe as Sidney Shannon (listed also as Shaw)
- Fred Kelsey as Dickens
- Frank Sully as Hertzog
- Eddie Marr as Mac
- Louis Jean Heydt as Arthur
- Gerald Mohr as Harry Cooper

== Production ==
While still a work-in-progress, the film was referred to as The Lone Wolf Goes to a Party. The film marked American actor Warren William's seventh and second-to-last portrayal of the Lone Wolf. It was the film debut of Ann Savage, who played Vivian, an acquaintance of the Lone Wolf's. One Dangerous Night was directed by Michael Gordon. The script was written by Donald Davis, based on Arnold Lippschitz' and Max Nosseck's story. L. W. O'Connell was signed on as cinematographer, while David Chatkin was in charge of producing for Columbia Pictures. Viola Lawrence was editor and M. W. Stoloff directed the film's music. The interior decorator was George Montgomery and the art directors were Lionel Banks and Robert Peterson. Principal photography officially commenced on September 10, 1942, and ended on September 29, 1942.

== Release ==
The film was released in the United States on January 22, 1943. The Blockbuster Guide to Movies and Videos (1995) described the film as "modest". In their 2010 book Savage Detours: The Life and Work of Ann Savage, Lisa Morton and Kent Adamson wrote that One Dangerous Night is largely "unremarkable" but "nonetheless entertaining", comparing it with After Midnight with Boston Blackie (1943).
