= Practically Yours =

1944 film by Mitchell Leisen

- Theatrical release poster
- Directed by: Mitchell Leisen
- Written by: Norman Krasna
- Produced by: Mitchell Leisen; Harry Tugend
- Starring: Claudette Colbert; Fred MacMurray; Cecil Kellaway
- Cinematography: Charles Lang
- Edited by: Doane Harrison
- Music by: Sam Coslow; Victor Young
- Production company: Paramount Pictures
- Distributed by: Paramount Pictures
- Release date: December 20, 1944
- Running time: 90 minutes
- Country: United States
- Language: English
- Budget: $1.2 million

Practically Yours is a 1944 American romantic comedy film directed by Mitchell Leisen and starring Claudette Colbert and Fred MacMurray and Cecil Kellaway. Written by Norman Krasna, it was produced and distributed by Paramount Pictures.

== Plot ==
When a young pilot, Daniel Bellamy, is presumed dead after crash-bombing an enemy aircraft carrier, the footage of the crash and his presumably final reminiscence of walking in the park with 'Piggy' and kissing her on the nose is sent back home. A typographical error in transcribing his words becomes a tribute to heroism, while a girl who worked in his office, Peggy, is thought to be the object of his secret love. However, Dan returns home and in order to save embarrassment for both the girl and himself, he tries to maintain the pretense. Dan reveals that he was not speaking of a girl but of his dog. A series of comical mishaps ensue, leading to a resolution of the misunderstanding.

== Cast ==
- Claudette Colbert as Peggy Martin
- Fred MacMurray as Daniel Bellamy
- Gil Lamb as Albert W. Beagell
- Cecil Kellaway as Marvin P. Meglin
- Robert Benchley as Judge Robert Simpson
- Tom Powers as Commander Harry Harpe
- Jane Frazee as Musical comedy star
- Rosemary DeCamp as Ellen Macy
- Isabel Randolph as Mrs. Meglin
- Mikhail Rasumny as LaCrosse
- Isabel Withers as Grace Mahoney
- George Carleton as Hardy
- Arthur Loft as Uncle Ben Bellamy
- Will Wright as Senator Cowling
- Donald MacBride as Sam
- Charles Quigley as George Macy
- Stanley Andrews as Shipyard Official
- Hugh Beaumont as Film-Cutter
- Hillary Brooke as Stenographer
- Kitty Kelly as Wife
- Louise LaPlanche as Attractive Girl
- Yvonne De Carlo as Office Clerk

== Production ==
The film was based on an original story by Norman Krasna. He had written a film called Bachelor Party that was produced by Buddy DeSylva, who had since become head of production at Paramount. In September 1943, Paramount bought Practically Yours from Krasna. He had written the story in his spare time while on duty for the armed services in Los Angeles.

In December 1943, Paramount announced the stars as Fred MacMurray and Paulette Goddard with George Marshall as director and Harry Tugend as producer. In January 1944, Goddard left for an army camp tour and her role was taken by Claudette Colbert. Mitchell Leisen replaced Marshall as director. Filming started in January 1944.

== Reception ==
The Los Angeles Times said the film "maybe ... isn't quite big time, but it has the look."

In a contemporary review for The New York Times, critic Bosley Crowther called the film "a curiously thick-skinned little comedy" but with "the ugly contours of a most callous and inhuman jest." Crowther was uneasy with the film's premise given the state of the warring world at the time, writing: "[T]he crocodile-tearful provocation which Norman Krasna used for the yarn is decidedly tasteless and unworthy. This is no time to joke about grief."

== Radio adaptation ==
Practically Yours was presented on Broadway Playhouse December 3, 1952. The 30-minute adaptation starred Gloria DeHaven.

== Bibliography ==
- Dick, Bernard F. Claudette Colbert: She Walked in Beauty. University Press of Mississippi, 2008.
- Milberg, Doris. The Art of the Screwball Comedy: Madcap Entertainment from the 1930s to Today. McFarland, 2013.
