= All the Fine Young Cannibals =

1960 film

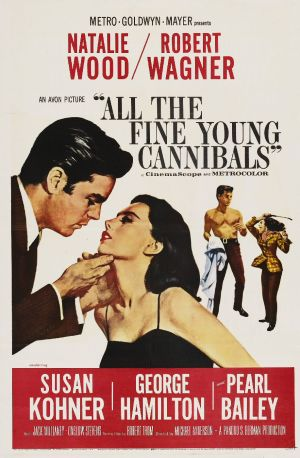
- Original movie poster by Reynold Brown
- Directed by: Michael Anderson
- Written by: Robert Thom
- Based on: novel The Bixby Girls by Rosamond Marshall
- Produced by: Pandro S. Berman
- Starring: Robert Wagner; Natalie Wood; Pearl Bailey; Susan Kohner; George Hamilton
- Cinematography: William H. Daniels
- Edited by: John McSweeney, Jr.
- Music by: Jeff Alexander
- Production company: Metro-Goldwyn-Mayer
- Distributed by: Loew's Inc.
- Release date: September 15, 1960
- Running time: 112 min.
- Country: United States
- Language: English
- Budget: $1,638,000
- Box office: $1,810,000

All the Fine Young Cannibals is a 1960 American drama film directed by Michael Anderson, starring Robert Wagner, Natalie Wood, Susan Kohner, George Hamilton, and Pearl Bailey. Hamilton said that the film "combined Southern Gothic with a biopic of jazzman Chet Baker." It was loosely based on The Bixby Girls, a 1957 novel by Rosamond Marshall that was set in the World War I era.

== Plot ==
Two young people in love, musician Chad Bixby and Sarah "Salome" Davis, are forced apart despite the latter's pregnancy. They marry others, but are brought back together by chance. A downtrodden blues singer mothers Bixby while guiding his career.

== Cast ==
- Robert Wagner as Chad Bixby
- Natalie Wood as Sarah "Salome" Davis
- Susan Kohner as Catherine McDowall
- George Hamilton as Tony McDowall
- Pearl Bailey as Ruby
- Jack Mullaney as Putney Tinker
- Onslow Stevens as Joshua Davis
- Anne Seymour as Mrs. Bixby
- Virginia Gregg as Ada Davis
- Mabel Albertson as Mrs. McDowall
- Louise Beavers as Rose

== Production ==
All the Fine Young Cannibals was the first film that Robert Wagner and Natalie Wood made together. George Hamilton says that director Vincente Minnelli shot some scenes when Michael Anderson was unavailable, including an ending for the film that was not used.

Wagner's character is loosely based on the jazz trumpeter Chet Baker.

== Reception ==
=== Box office ===
According to MGM records, the film earned $950,000 in the U.S. and Canada, and $860,000 elsewhere, resulting in a loss of $1,108,000.

=== Critical ===
Filmink argued "it’s not a very good movie – director Michael Anderson seems ill at ease with the material, which needed a Douglas Sirk, and the talented cast are allowed to over act. "

== Influence ==
The film's title was later taken by the English band Fine Young Cannibals.

== See also ==
- List of American films of 1960
