= The Luck of the Irish (1948 film) =

1948 film by Henry Koster

- Theatrical poster
- Directed by: Henry Koster
- Written by: Philip Dunne
- Produced by: Fred Kohlmar
- Starring: Tyrone Power; Anne Baxter; Cecil Kellaway; Lee J. Cobb
- Cinematography: Joseph LaShelle
- Edited by: J. Watson Webb Jr.
- Music by: Cyril Mockridge
- Production company: 20th Century Fox
- Distributed by: 20th Century Fox
- Release date: September 15, 1948
- Running time: 99 minutes
- Country: United States
- Language: English

The Luck of the Irish is a 1948 American comedy film directed by Henry Koster, and starring Tyrone Power and Anne Baxter. The film was based on the 1948 novel There Was a Little Man by Guy Pearce Jones and Constance Bridges Jones.

== Plot ==
Stephen Fitzgerald, a newspaper reporter from New York, meets a leprechaun and beautiful young Nora, while traveling in Ireland. When he returns to his fiancée, Frances, and her wealthy father, David C. Augur, in the midst of a political campaign in New York, he finds that the leprechaun and the young woman are now in the big city as well. Stephen is torn between the wealth he might enjoy in New York and returning to his roots in Ireland.

== Cast ==
- Tyrone Power as Stephen Fitzgerald
- Anne Baxter as Nora
- Cecil Kellaway as Horace
- Lee J. Cobb as David C. Augur
- Jayne Meadows as Frances Augur
- James Todd as Bill Clark
- J. M. Kerrigan as Tatie the innkeeper
- Phil Brown as Tom Higginbotham
- John Davidson as Reporter (uncredited)
- George Melford as Doorman (uncredited)

== Awards and nominations ==
- Best Supporting Actor (nomination) - Cecil Kellaway

== Radio adaptation ==
The Luck of the Irish was presented on Lux Radio Theatre on CBS December 27, 1948. The adaptation starred Dana Andrews, Baxter, Kellaway, and Stanley Holloway.
