= The Lone Wolf and His Lady =

1949 film by John Hoffman

- Theatrical release poster
- Directed by: John Hoffman
- Screenplay by: Michael Stuart Boylan
- Story by: Edward Dein
- Based on: Lone Wolf by Louis Joseph Vance
- Produced by: Rudolph C. Flothow
- Starring: Ron Randell; June Vincent; Alan Mowbray; William Frawley
- Cinematography: Philip Tannura
- Edited by: James Sweeney
- Music by: Mischa Bakaleinikoff
- Production company: Columbia Pictures
- Distributed by: Columbia Pictures
- Release date: March 1949
- Running time: 60 minutes
- Country: United States
- Language: English

The Lone Wolf and His Lady is a 1949 American mystery film directed by John Hoffman and starring Ron Randell, June Vincent and Alan Mowbray. It is the 15th and final Lone Wolf film produced by Columbia Pictures, and was written by Edward Dein and Michael Stuart Boylan.

The Lone Wolf and His Lady features Ron Randell in his first and only appearance as the former jewel thief turned private detective, the Lone Wolf. (He had played Bulldog Drummond twice.)

== Plot ==
The much-valued Tahara diamond is looted during its opening showcase. A suspicious Inspector Crane suspects reformed jewel thief and current private detective Michael Lanyard, alias the "Lone Wolf," to be the perpetrator and promptly arrests him. In actuality, the true masterminds are Steve Taylor and Joe Brewster.

An eagle-eyed Jamison, Lanyard's butler, spots the two criminals' hideout. It is revealed that they are involved with precious stone cutter Myriber Van Groot. Nearby news anchor Grace Duffy decides to join Jamison and the Lone Wolf, who has evaded capture, in storming the jewel thieves' hiding spot. Taylor and Brewster are handcuffed but in the middle of the scuffle, the Tahara is accidentally flung out of the window. Upon retrieval by Duffy, the jewel is found to be a fake. Lanyard deduces that Van Groot took away the real diamond and has the police capture him.

== Cast ==
- Ron Randell as Michael Lanyard / The Lone Wolf
- June Vincent as Grace Duffy
- Alan Mowbray as Jamison, Lanyard's Valet
- William Frawley as Inspector J.D. Crane
- Collette Lyons as Marta Frisbie
- Douglass Dumbrille as John J. Murdock
- James Todd as Tanner
- Steven Geray as Mynher Van Groot
- Robert Barrat as Steve Taylor (credited as Robert H. Barrat)

== Production ==
After Gerald Mohr stopped portraying the title character Lone Wolf, also known as Michael Lanyard, the production company and distributor Columbia Pictures selected Australian actor Ron Randell as his replacement. In addition, Alan Mowbray replaced Eric Blore as Lanyard's butler Jamison.

Randell's casting was announced in July 1948. Columbia said they hoped to star Randell in "three or four" of these movies "if they click". Lois Maxwell was announced as his co star.

John Hoffman served as director of the film. Rudolph C. Flothow was in charge of production for Columbia Pictures, while Michael Stuart Boylan wrote the screenplay based on a story by Richard Dein. Philip Tannura signed on as cinematographer. The set decorator was James Crowe. Mischa Bakaleinikoff headed the musical direction, and James Sweeney edited the film. Principal photography officially began on August 9, 1948, and ended on August 20, 1948.

== Reception ==
The Los Angeles Times said the film "fills out the prescribed running time".

Variety said "it answers all demands for the supporting market."

Film historian Leonard Maltin described the film as, "The Wolf turns newshound to cover the exhibition of a famous gem, and of course it's stolen, and of course he's suspected. Randell previously helped kill the Bulldog Drummond series, and does the same here in this final entry. Mowbray inherits Eric Blore's role as Jamison the valet." As a "relaunch" of the series, The Lone Wolf and His Lady was not considered successful, and Columbia ended the film series.
