= South of Suez =

1940 film

- Directed by: Lewis Seiler
- Written by: Sheridan Gibney; Michael Hogan
- Screenplay by: Barry Trivers
- Produced by: Bryan Foy
- Starring: George Brent; Brenda Marshall; George Tobias; James Stephenson
- Cinematography: Arthur L. Todd
- Edited by: Clarence Kolster
- Music by: Friedrich Hollaender
- Production company: Warner Bros. Pictures
- Distributed by: Warner Bros. Pictures
- Release date: November 16, 1940
- Running time: 86 minutes
- Country: United States
- Language: English

South of Suez is a 1940 American drama film directed by Lewis Seiler and starring George Brent, Brenda Marshall and George Tobias. An alleged murder in an African diamond mine haunts a man many years later after he has returned to Britain. The film was made as a programmer by Warner Bros. Pictures. It was part of a cycle of British-themed films made by Hollywood studios during the era.

== Plot ==
In 1930s East Africa, mining engineer John Gamble (George Brent) is falsely accused of killing his partner, Roger Smythe (Miles Mander). Actually, the real culprit is a rival prospector, Eli Snedeker (George Tobias), a man obsessed with diamonds. Snedeker shot Smythe while unsuccessfully searching for the latter's $50,000 gem, dubbed the Star of Africa. Later, Snedeker convinced other miners of Gamble's guilt. Having been framed, Gamble now has no choice but to flee Africa. So he stows away on a ship bound for England. Upon arriving, Gamble changes his name to "John Bradley" and dabbles in investment banking. Years later, after achieving wealth, he meets and falls in love with a rich heiress, Kit Sheffield (Brenda Marshall), who turns out to be the daughter of Smythe, Gamble's dead partner. She tells Gamble/Bradley that her one overriding ambition in life is to see John Gamble dead.

One rainy evening, Fate offers Gamble the opportunity to rid himself of his old identity. He secretly plants his credentials on the body of a dead, unknown itinerant beneath a London bridge. The subsequent discovery of the corpse convinces authorities that John Gamble is indeed dead. This clears the way for he and Kit to marry. But a fateful intervention results in a courtroom trial involving Snedeker, who has moved to London as a semi-retired diamond cutter. Gamble/Bradley reluctantly testifies and confirms Snedeker's accusation that he is the real John Gamble, the suspected murderer of Kit's father. However, Snedeker's wife (Lee Patrick) volunteers further testimony. She is sworn in and reveals that she had observed Snedeker killing Smythe. To the astonishment of the court, Snedeker pulls out a pistol and shoots his wife. But her input is enough to convince the court that Gamble is innocent of Smythe's murder. He and Kit can now, finally, marry.

== Cast ==
- George Brent as John Gamble a.k.a. John Bradley
- Brenda Marshall as Katharine 'Kit' Sheffield
- George Tobias as Eli Snedeker
- James Stephenson as Inspector Thornton
- Lee Patrick as Delia Snedeker
- Eric Blore as Harold 'Limey' Wemsley
- Miles Mander as Roger Smythe
- Cecil Kellaway as Henry Putnam
- Mary Forbes as Mrs. Putnam
- Gilbert Emery as Manders
- Stanley Logan as Prosecutor
- Frederick Worlock as Defense Counsel
- Edward Fielding as Judge
- Leonard Mudie as Registrar
- Crauford Kent as Sedley
- Holmes Herbert as Simpson
- Prince Modupe as Lano
- Ernie Stanton as Private Detective (uncredited)

== Production ==
The lead role was meant to be played by George Raft but he turned it down, so George Brent played it.

== Bibliography ==
- Glancy, H. Mark. When Hollywood Loved Britain: The Hollywood 'British' Film 1939-1945. Manchester University Press, 1999.
