= Down to the Sea in Ships (1949 film) =

1949 film by Henry Hathaway

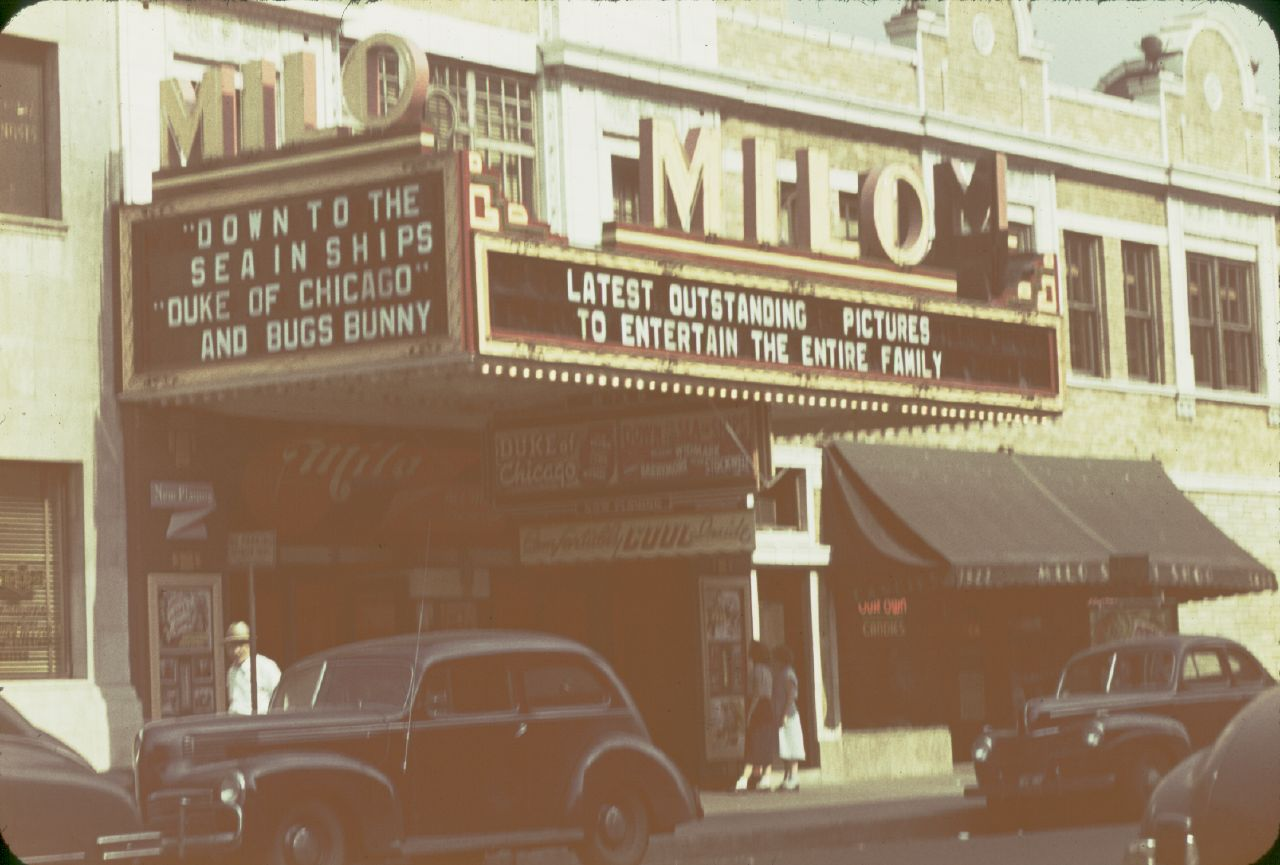
- Chicago theater showing the film
- Directed by: Henry Hathaway
- Screenplay by: John Lee Mahin; Sy Bartlett
- Story by: Sy Bartlett
- Produced by: Louis D. Lighton
- Starring: Richard Widmark; Lionel Barrymore; Dean Stockwell; Cecil Kellaway; Gene Lockhart; Berry Kroeger; John McIntire; Harry Morgan; Harry Davenport; Paul Harvey; Jay C. Flippen
- Cinematography: Joseph MacDonald
- Edited by: Dorothy Spencer
- Music by: Alfred Newman
- Production company: 20th Century Fox
- Distributed by: 20th Century Fox
- Release date: February 22, 1949
- Running time: 120 min.
- Country: United States
- Language: English
- Box office: $1,650,000

Down to the Sea in Ships is a 1949 American seafaring drama film directed by Henry Hathaway, starring Richard Widmark and Lionel Barrymore. The supporting cast includes Dean Stockwell, Cecil Kellaway, Gene Lockhart, and John McIntire. There is no connection between this picture and the silent film by the same name; the only thing they have in common is the title and the setting.

== Plot ==
Elderly whaling ship Captain Bering Joy (Lionel Barrymore) walks on crutches and is at the end of his career, based in New Bedford. His cousin Captain Jason Briggs visits and they debate Captain Joy's next voyage.

Captain Joy takes his grandson Jed (Dean Stockwell) to the large but empty family house and gives him some education in preparation for a test. After their bedtime prayer grandpa says the outcome of the test is not so important. The next day he goes with Jed to meet with Andrew Bush, the school principal, who had once served under Captain Joy. Jed sits for the one hour written exam to determine whether he can be allowed to continue his education at sea or will be compelled to stay ashore and attend formal schoolroom classes. Jed fails the test, but Principal Bush instructs the teacher who had administered the test to change the score from 32 to 70 so the boy can be allowed to again go to sea, where he will learn real-life manly virtues from his grandfather.

Once the boy's status is settled, Captain Joy goes to see Captain Jason Briggs who owns the ship (The Pride of New Bedford) and is introduced to Mr. Dan Lunceford who has been selected to serve as first mate on the ship's next whaling expedition. Mr. Lunceford has had a college education in marine biology specializing in the whale. Captain Joy is unimpressed by this but secretly recognizes Mr. Lunceford's potential as a tutor for Jeb.

Captain Joy is then commissioned by Captain Briggs to command another whaling expedition in The Pride of New Bedford with Mr. Lunceford as First mate and takes Jed along on the whaling expedition. Once at sea, Captain Joy instructs Mr. Lunceford to tutor Jeb in his schooling. Meanwhile, Captain Joy secretly consults books in the privacy of his cabin to keep abreast of Mr. Lunceford in the eyes of Jed, even though the captain values life experience over book-learning. And Captain Joy mocks Mr. Lunceford's newfangled ideas about numerous things.

Jed begins to idolize Mr. Lunceford. Jed is overjoyed when it is he who spots the first whale of the expedition. Mr. Lunceford goes out in command of a whaleboat crew to pursue the whale, with harpooner Britton in the bow of the boat. Captain Joy watches from the ship. The boat avoids being wrecked by the whale's tail, but the harpooner strikes, and the boat gets pulled along by the whale. Harpooner Britton gets his arm trapped and crushed in the confusion and Mr. Lunceford cuts the harpoon line with a hatchet to free him. Captain Joy subsequently congratulates Mr. Lunceford for making the correct decision (in freeing the harpooner) and acting quickly.

A separate boat is sent to snare the whale and succeeds. The crew strip the whale of its blubber and cut the blubber into chunks on deck to be rendered of whale oil on the ship's tryworks.

Next, Jed is allowed on the tiller of a whaleboat. Captain Joy watches with pride. But a fog bank approaches and the crew have to cease whaling. However the boat with Jed aboard is still out in the fog and has not returned. Mr. Lunceford tries to persuade Captain Joy to send a second search boat out, but the captain has a rule against sending out a second boat and resorts to prayer instead. Mr. Lunceford disobeys the captain's orders and lowers a second boat (with him in command) anyway. The boat with Jed aboard is found destroyed - probably in an encounter with a whale. Mr. Lunceford rescues the stranded crew including Jed, but is reprimanded by Captain joy and relieved of his duties for disobeying orders and, thereby, challenging the authority of the captain. Mr. Lunceford is to be put ashore at the next port of call - Valparaíso. Jed requests of his grandfather that he be put ashore along with Mr. Lunceford.

Captain Joy has to start manning a whaleboat himself after relieving Mr. Lunceford of duty. The captain snares a whale off Cape Horn. However, the captain becomes ill from the exertion and must pass command to Mr. Lunceford, even offering Lunceford the captain's cabin (which Mr. Lunceford declines). Mr. Lunceford wants to head for Montevideo but is encouraged to keep whaling. Captain Joy, as he lies in the captain's bed, explains he was born in the captain's cabin of The Pride of New Bedford in the Bering Sea; hence his name.

Mr. Lunceford explains to Jed that the captain always chooses what is best for the ship.

Encountering a thick fog in the Antarctic Ocean, the ship sideswipes an iceberg as the crew are echo sounding with both voice and a foghorn in an attempt to avoid a collision. The collision holes the ship below the waterline. Mr. Lunceford goes over the side on a rope to investigate. Even though holed below the water line, the ship is resting on a ridge of ice below the water line. Harpooner Britton comes down to assist Mr. Lunceford but is crushed between the ship and the ice. Mr. Lunceford tries to help Britton and Lunceford's arm is broken in the attempt. The crew get both men back on board, but Britton is dead. Captain Joy arrives from below deck to organize the jury-rig patching of the hole in the ship's hull.

Captain Joy relapses after supervising the hull patching operation. Thatch catches pneumonia and is also unlikely to survive. At the captain's bedside Jed (apologetically) withdraws his request to be put ashore, just before his grandfather dies of exposure exacerbated by old age.

An entry is placed in the log that Captain Bering Joy was buried at sea: born on this vessel, died on this vessel. At the conclusion of the movie Mr. Lunceford tells Jed that they will have a hard time trying to match Captain Joy's record in future whaling expeditions.

== Cast ==
- Richard Widmark as First Mate Dan Lunceford
- Lionel Barrymore as Captain Bering Joy
- Dean Stockwell as Jed Joy
- Cecil Kellaway as Slush Tubbs
- Gene Lockhart as Andrew Bush
- Berry Kroeger as Manchester
- John McIntire as Thatch
- Harry Morgan as Britton
- Harry Davenport as Benjamin Harris
- Paul Harvey as Captain Jason Briggs
- Jay C. Flippen as Sewell
- Arthur Hohl as Blair (uncredited)
- Dorothy Adams as Bush's secretary

== Reception ==
The New York Times February 23, 1949, review by “T. M. P.” praised the film, describing the action with relish and concluding: “Down to the Sea in Ships is a good adventure for man and boy, for it makes some points about character building which can do none of us any harm.”

On December 31, 1948, Variety staff observed that the “first half is becalmed“ in thorough character development, but “In the last hour, picture really shakes out its sails and goes wing-and-winging before the wind. The taking of a whale and the rendering of blubber to oil, the dangers of fog and the menace of a wreck on an iceberg is sturdy excitement that serves as a fitting climax to the story of an old whaler captain, his young grandson and of a young first mate.”

Leonard Maltin gives the film three out of four stars, calling it a “good atmospheric yarn”.

== See also ==
- Lionel Barrymore filmography
