= Cecil Kellaway =

South African actor (1890–1973)

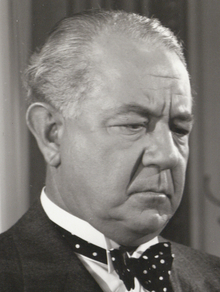
- Born: Cecil Lauriston Kellaway; 22 August 1890; Cape Town, Cape Colony (now South Africa)
- Died: 28 February 1973 (aged 82); Los Angeles, California, U.S.
- Occupation: Actor
- Years active: 1921−1972
- Spouse: Doreen Elizabeth Joubert (m. 1919)
- Children: 2
- Relatives: Alec Kellaway (brother); Edmund Gwenn (cousin); Arthur Chesney (cousin); Ann Dummett (cousin)

Cecil Lauriston Kellaway (22 August 1890 – 28 February 1973) was a South African-British character actor. He was nominated for the Academy Award for Best Supporting Actor twice, for The Luck of the Irish (1948) and Guess Who's Coming to Dinner (1967).

== Early life ==
Cecil Kellaway was born on 22 August 1890, in Cape Town, Cape Colony. (Note: Some sources, including the German Wikipedia page at de:Cecil Kellaway, claim he was born in 1893; the page acknowledges the confusion and claims a majority of sources refer to 1893 as his birth year. Kellaway's Petition for Naturalization as a United States Citizen (#175514), filed in 1951, cites 1890.) He was the son of English parents, Rebecca Annie (née Brebner) and Edwin John Kellaway, an architect and engineer. Edwin had immigrated to Cape Town to work on the Houses of Parliament there. He was a good friend of mining tycoon and nation-builder Cecil Rhodes, who became young Cecil's namesake and godfather. Cecil had two brothers, Alec Kellaway (1894–1973), who was also an actor, and Jan Kowsky, a ballet dancer.

Cecil was interested in acting from an early age. He was educated at the Normal College, Cape Town, and in England at Bradford Grammar School. He studied engineering and got work at an electrical engineering firm in Cape Town after returning to South Africa. However the lure of acting was too strong and he became a full-time actor, making his debut in Potash and Perlmutter. Early plays included The Prince of Pilsen.

He briefly served in the army in 1914 but was invalided out.

On 15 November 1919, he married 17-year-old Doreen Elizabeth Joubert in Johannesburg, with whom he would later have two sons.

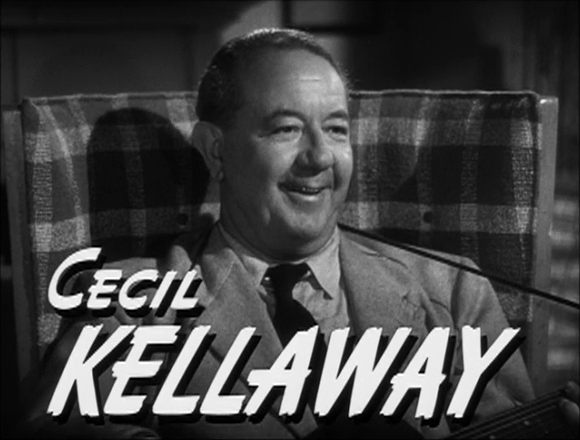
from the trailer for The Postman Always Rings Twice (1946)

He toured for three years through China, Japan, Siam, Borneo, Malaya, North and South Africa, and Europe, in plays such as Monsieur Beaucaire.

== Australia ==
=== Australian theatre ===
Kellaway arrived in Australia in 1921 under contract to J. C. Williamson Ltd. He had a notable success as the comic father of four daughters in A Night Out which he played through most of 1922; it kicked off a sixteen year association with Williamsons on the Australian stage, mostly in musical comedies. Kellaway would often return to the role in later years. Filmink wrote that over the next two decade Kellaway's "speciality was doing variations on" his performance in A Night Out - "the dad-next-door, confused, henpecked, dim, meddling, sometimes gruff, stressed, fond of a joke, loyal, prone to interfering in his daughter's love lives, decent down deep... it's an archetype familiar from countless TV sitcoms."

For Williamsons Kellaway was in Mary (1922–23) then returned to A Night Out before going on to The Cabaret Girl (1923–24), Kissing Time (1924), Whirled into Happiness (1924), Katja (1925), The Belle of New York (1925), Primrose (1925), A Night Out revival (1926), Frasquita (1927), Princess Charming (1928), Hold Everything (1929), Florodora (1931), A Warm Corner (1931), A Night Out again, Sons o' Guns (1931), Blue Roses (1932), Hold my Hand (1932), The Gipsy Princess (1933), and Waltzes from Vienna (1936).

=== Australian films ===
By the early 1930s Kellaway was one of the biggest stars in Australian theatre. He made his film debut in the lead of The Hayseeds (1933), a popular local comedy, directed by Beaumont Smith. Filmink argued "he feels a little miscast doing an imitation of Bert Bailey here – Kellaway always gave off a kindly, gentle vibe, and the big "battler" speech he gives badly lacks Bailey's fire."

Kellaway's main focus was still the stage: The Dubarry (1934), Music in the Air (1934), Roberta (1935), High Jinks (1935), Ball at the Savoy (1935), A Southern Maid (1936) and White Horse Inn (1936).

He returned to films with the Australian Cinesound production It Isn't Done (1937), for which he also provided the original story. Directed by Ken G. Hall it was a popular success, and led to Kellaway being screen-tested and put under contract by RKO Pictures.

He appeared in A Southern Maid on stage in 1937.

== Hollywood ==
=== RKO ===
RKO initially put Kellaway into small roles: Everybody's Doing It (1938), Double Danger (1938), Night Spot (1938), Maid's Night Out (1938), This Marriage Business (1938), and Law of the Underworld (1938). Kellaway was first given a sizeable role, billed third for Blond Cheat (1938), with Joan Fontaine. However his parts generally remained small: Smashing the Rackets (1938), Tarnished Angel (1938), Annabel Takes a Tour (1938), and Gunga Din (1939).

Kellaway returned to Australia for a second Cinesound film, Mr. Chedworth Steps Out (1939), which featured a young Peter Finch. It was shot in October–November 1938. His performance in the film has been described as "perfect... with his little man energy, sexless marriage, well-meaning blundering, and touching warmth."

Back in Hollywood the scope and quality of Kellaway's roles improved, with Wuthering Heights (1939), for William Wyler, as Cathy's father. He was in The Sun Never Sets (1939), Man About Town (1939) at Paramount, and The Under-Pup (1939). He turned down The Private Lives of Elizabeth and Essex (1939) to do Intermezzo (1939) for David O. Selznick. He later made We Are Not Alone (1939).

Kellaway was in Mexican Spitfire (1940) at RKO, The Invisible Man Returns (1940) and The House of the Seven Gables (1940) at Universal, Adventure in Diamonds (1940), Phantom Raiders (1940), Brother Orchid (1940), Pop Always Pays (1940), The Mummy's Hand (1940), Diamond Frontier (1940), and Mexican Spitfire Out West (1940) at RKO. He turned down Balalaika to do The Letter (1940) for Wyler.

Kellaway was in South of Suez (1940) at Warners, and Lady with Red Hair (1940). He received billing in The Letter, but is only glimpsed briefly in a party scene, his role having been cut.

=== Paramount ===
Kellaway made West Point Widow (1941) at Paramount and signed a contract with that studio. He did A Very Young Lady (1941) at Fox, Burma Convoy (1941), New York Town (1941), Birth of the Blues (1941), and Appointment for Love (1941) at Universal.

At Paramount, he was in The Night of January 16th (1941), Bahama Passage (1941), The Lady Has Plans (1941), and Take a Letter, Darling (1941). Fox borrowed him for Small Town Deb (1941), then he returned to Paramount for Are Husbands Necessary? (1942), and Night in New Orleans (1942).

Kellaway had a strong part in I Married a Witch (1942) as Veronica Lake's character's father. He followed it with My Heart Belongs to Daddy (1942).

He had cameos in Star Spangled Rhythm (1943) and Forever and a Day (1943), and was in The Crystal Ball (1943), and It Ain't Hay (1943).

Paramount gave him the starring role in The Good Fellows (1943). He returned to supporting parts for Frenchman's Creek (1944). He was going to do Out of This World on Broadway when he was offered the role of Edward VII in Mrs. Parkington (1944) at Metro-Goldwyn-Mayer.

Back at Paramount, he was in And Now Tomorrow (1944), Practically Yours (1944), and Love Letters (1945), the latter also starring Kellaway's one-time Australian co-star Ann Richards.

In Kitty (1945), he was as painter Thomas Gainsborough. MGM borrowed him to play the ill-fated husband of Lana Turner's character in The Postman Always Rings Twice (1946), a supporting role in Easy to Wed (1946) and the villain in The Cockeyed Miracle (1946).

In early 1946, he was earning $1,500 a week but said he was considering returning to Australia to run a film studio because he was sick of playing small roles.

Back at Paramount he was in Monsieur Beaucaire (1946), Variety Girl (1947), and Unconquered (1947).

Kellaway was borrowed by Warners for Always Together (1947) then he went to 20th Century Fox for The Luck of the Irish (1948), which earned him an Oscar nomination.

Kellaway went to RKO for Joan of Arc (1948).

Kellaway was in The Decision of Christopher Blake (1948), Portrait of Jennie (1948), Down to the Sea in Ships (1949), The Reformer and the Redhead (1950), back at MGM.

In 1950, it was announced James Hilton was writing a script as a vehicle for Kellaway, Roof of the World, based on the actor's time in India. It was not made.

He was in Harvey (1950), Kim (1950), Katie Did It (1951), Francis Goes to the Races (1951), Half Angel (1951), and The Highwayman (1951).

He returned to Paramount for Thunder in the East (1952) and was in Just Across the Street (1952), My Wife's Best Friend (1952), Young Bess (1953), The Beast from 20,000 Fathoms (1953), Cruisin' Down the River (1953), and Paris Model (1953).

In 1954, he became an American citizen (his nationality had been South African).

At MGM he was in The Prodigal (1955) and Interrupted Melody (1955), playing an Australian in the latter (the father of Marjorie Lawrence). He did two with Jeff Chandler, Female on the Beach (1955) and The Toy Tiger (1956), and was billed second (to Ethel Barrymore) in Johnny Trouble (1957).

He worked regularly on television in shows like Lux Video Theatre, The Ford Television Theatre, Schlitz Playhouse, Cavalcade of America, Schlitz Playhouse, Playhouse 90, Studio One in Hollywood, Matinee Theatre, and Crossroads.

Kellaway was in The Proud Rebel (1958), The Shaggy Dog (1959), and The Private Lives of Adam and Eve (1960).

He appeared on Broadway in Greenwillow (1960) which had a short run.

=== Television ===
On American television, he made a guest appearance in 1959 on Perry Mason as chemist Darrell Metcalf in "The Case of the Glittering Goldfish", and he received a billing credit in that episode equal to Raymond Burr's.

Kellaway then guest-starred two years later on CBS's Western series Rawhide, portraying the character MacKay in the episode "Incident in the Middle of Nowhere".

In 1954 he guest starred as "old codger" Kirby in Episode 24 on the second season of the television show Make Room for Daddy, later renamed The Danny Thomas Show.

He also made appearances in the television series Whirlybirds, The Millionaire, The Ann Sothern Show, Harrigan and Son, Hennesey, Johnny Ringo, The Twilight Zone, The New Breed, Adventures in Paradise, Mr. Smith Goes to Washington, Follow the Sun and Ben Casey, as well as the television movie Destination Space.

Kellaway was in Francis of Assisi (1961), Tammy Tell Me True (1961), Zotz! (1962), The Cardinal (1963), Hush... Hush, Sweet Charlotte (1964), and Quick, Let's Get Married (1964).

In 1963 he guest starred as museum curator Wilbur Canfield in Episode 19 on the first season of the television show My Favorite Martian. In 1964 he played Santa Claus in the "Visions of Sugarplums" episode of Bewitched. In 1968, Kellaway played the part of a lonely, ultra-wealthy much older suitor of Ann Marie (played by Marlo Thomas) in the season 2, episode 30 of That Girl. Other TV appearances included Valentine's Day, Burke's Law, The F.B.I., and The Greatest Show on Earth.

=== Later work ===
Kellaway's last films included Spinout (1966), The Adventures of Bullwhip Griffin (1967) and Guess Who's Coming to Dinner (1967), which earned him another Oscar nomination.

He appeared in episodes of The Ghost & Mrs. Muir and Nanny and the Professor and the TV version of Kismet (1967).

His final performances included Fitzwilly (1969), Getting Straight (1970), The Wacky Zoo of Morgan City (1971) and a pilot for a TV series, Call Holme (1971).

== Filmography ==
- Bond and Word (1918)
- The Hayseeds (1933) as Dad Hayseed
- It Isn't Done (1937) as Hubert Blaydon; also based on Kellaway's original story
- Wise Girl (1937) as Fletcher's Butler (unconfirmed)
- Everybody's Doing It (1938) as Mr. Beyers
- Double Danger (1938) as Fetrisss / Gilhooley
- Night Spot (1938) as Willard Lorryweather
- Maid's Night Out (1938) as Geoffrey
- This Marriage Business (1938) as Police Chief Hardy
- Law of the Underworld (1938) as Phillips – Gene's Butler (uncredited)
- Blond Cheat (1938) as Rufus Trent
- Smashing the Rackets (1938) as Barrett (uncredited)
- Tarnished Angel (1938) as Reginald 'Reggie' Roland
- Annabel Takes a Tour (1938) as Strothers, River-Clyde's Publisher (uncredited)
- Gunga Din (1939) as Mr. Stebbins (uncredited)
- Wuthering Heights (1939) as Earnshaw
- Mr. Chedworth Steps Out (1939) as George Chedworth
- The Sun Never Sets (1939) as Colonial Official
- Man About Town (1939) as Headwaiter (uncredited)
- The Under-Pup (1939) as Mr. Wendelhares (uncredited)
- Intermezzo (1939) as Charles Moler
- We Are Not Alone (1939) as Judge
- Mexican Spitfire (1940) as Mr. Chumley
- The Invisible Man Returns (1940) as Inspector Sampson
- The House of the Seven Gables (1940) as Philip Barton
- Adventure in Diamonds (1940) as Emerson
- Phantom Raiders (1940) as Franklin Morris
- Brother Orchid (1940) as Brother Goodwin
- Pop Always Pays (1940) (scenes cut)
- The Mummy's Hand (1940) as The Great Solvani
- Diamond Frontier (1940) as Noah
- Mexican Spitfire Out West (1940) as Mr. Chumley
- The Letter (1940) as Prescott
- South of Suez (1940) as Henry Putnam
- Lady with Red Hair (1940) as Mr. Chapman
- West Point Widow (1941) as Dr. Spencer
- A Very Young Lady (1941) as Professor Starkweather
- Burma Convoy (1941) as Angus McBragel
- New York Town (1941) as Shipboard Host
- Birth of the Blues (1941) as Granet
- Appointment for Love (1941) as O'Leary
- The Night of January 16th (1941) as Oscar
- Bahama Passage (1941) as Captain Jack Risingwell
- The Lady Has Plans (1942) as Peter Miles
- Take a Letter, Darling (1942) as Uncle George
- Small Town Deb (1941) as Henry Randall
- Are Husbands Necessary? (1942) as Dr. Buell
- Night in New Orleans (1942) as Dan Odell
- I Married a Witch (1942) as Daniel
- My Heart Belongs to Daddy (1942) as Alfred Fortescue
- Star Spangled Rhythm (1942) as Cecil Kellaway (uncredited)
- Freedom Comes High (1943, Short) as Ellen's Father
- Forever and a Day (1943) as Dinner Guest
- The Crystal Ball (1943) as Pop Tibbets
- It Ain't Hay (1943) as King O'Hara
- The Good Fellows (1943) as Jim Hilton
- Showboat Serenade (1944, Short) as Colonel Jordan
- Frenchman's Creek (1944) as William
- Mrs Parkington (1944) as Edward, Prince of Wales
- And Now Tomorrow (1944) as Dr. Weeks
- Practically Yours (1944) as Marvin P. Meglin
- Love Letters (1945) as Mac
- Kitty (1945) as Thomas Gainsborough
- The Postman Always Rings Twice (1946) as Nick Smith
- Easy to Wed (1946) as J. B. Allenbury
- Monsieur Beaucaire (1946) as Count D'Armand
- The Cockeyed Miracle (1946) as Tony Carter
- Variety Girl (1947) as Cecil Kellaway
- Unconquered (1947) as Jeremy Love
- Always Together (1947) as Jonathan Turner
- The Luck of the Irish (1948) as Horace
- Joan of Arc (1948) as Jean Le Maistre – Inquisitor of Rouen
- The Decision of Christopher Blake (1948) as Judge Alexander Adamson
- Portrait of Jennie (1948) as Matthews
- Down to the Sea in Ships (1949) as Slush Tubbs
- The Reformer and the Redhead (1950) as Doctor Kevin G. Maguire
- Harvey (1950) as Dr. Chumley
- Kim (1950) as Hurree Chunder
- Katie Did It (1951) as Nathaniel B. Wakeley VI
- Francis Goes to the Races (1951) as Colonel Travers
- Half Angel (1951) as Harry Gilpin
- The Highwayman (1951) as Lord Herbert
- Thunder in the East (1952) as Dr. Willoughby
- Just Across the Street (1952) as Pop Smith
- My Wife's Best Friend (1952) as Rev. Thomas Chamberlain
- Young Bess (1953) as Mr. Parry
- The Beast from 20,000 Fathoms (1953) as Dr. Thurgood Elson
- Cruisin' Down the River (1953) as Thadeus Jackson
- Paris Model (1953) as Patrick J. "P. J." Sullivan
- The Prodigal (1955) as Governor
- Interrupted Melody (1955) as Bill Lawrence
- Female on the Beach (1955) as Osbert Sorenson
- The Toy Tiger (1956) as James Fusenot
- Johnny Trouble (1957) as Tom McKay
- The Proud Rebel (1958) as Doctor Enos Davis
- Destination Space (1959 TV movie) as Dr. A. A. Andrews
- The Shaggy Dog (1959) as Professor Plumcutt
- The Private Lives of Adam and Eve (1960) as Doc Bayles
- Francis of Assisi (1961) as Cardinal Hugolino
- Tammy Tell Me True (1961) as Captain Joe
- Zotz! (1962) as Dean Joshua Updike
- The Cardinal (1963) as Monsignor Monaghan
- Hush...Hush, Sweet Charlotte (1964) as Harry Willis
- Quick, Let's Get Married (1964) as The Bishop
- Spinout (1966) as Bernard Ranley
- The Adventures of Bullwhip Griffin (1967) as Mr. Pemberton
- Kismet (1967 TV movie)
- Guess Who's Coming to Dinner (1967) as Monsignor Mike Ryan
- Fitzwilly (1967) as Buckmaster
- Getting Straight (1970) as Doctor Kasper
- The Wacky Zoo of Morgan City (1970) as Old Al Casey
- Call Holme (1972 TV movie) as Lord Basil Hyde-Smith

== Television ==
Year	Title	Role	Notes
1950	Magnavox Theatre	Jonathan Hintooon Smith	S1:E7, "The Hurricane at Pilgrim Hill"
1957	Lux Video Theatre	Pop Smith	S7:E16, "Just Across the Street"
1959	Perry Mason	Darrell Metcalf	S2:E14, "The Case of The Glittering Goldfish"
1960	The Twilight Zone	Elmer Wickwire	S1E20, Elegy
1961	Rawhide	MacKay	S3:E22, "Incident in the Middle of Nowhere"
1963	The Twilight Zone	Ian Burgess	S4:E17, "Passage on the Lady Anne"
1964	Bewitched	Santa Claus	S1:E15, "A Vision of Sugar Plums"
1966	The F.B.I.	Uncle Walter	S1:E16, "The Hijackers"

== Select theatre credits ==
- Potash and Perlmutter – South Africa
- The Prince of Pilsen – South Africa
- The Little Whopper (1921)
- Monseuir Beaucaire (1917) – toured India and Africa
- A Night Out (Jan-Sept 1922) – Melbourne, Sydney, Adelaide
- Mary (Oct 1922 – April 1923) – Melbourne, Brisbane, Sydney
- A Night Out (April 1923) – Sydney
- The Cabaret Girl (Aug 1923 – March 1924)
- Kissing Time (May 1924) – Melbourne
- Whirled into Happiness (June–July 1924) – Melbourne
- Katja (December 1925) – Sydney
- The Belle of New York
- Primrose (August 1925) – Sydney
- Frasquita (April 1927) – Sydney
- Princess Charming (July 1928) – Brisbane
- Hold Everything (July 1929)
- Florodora (1931)
- A Warm Corner (Sept 1931)
- Sons o' Guns (1931)
- Blue Roses (April–August 1932) – Melbourne, Sydney, Brisbane, Adelaide, Wellington, Auckland
- Hold my Hand (October 1932) – Her Majesty's Theatre, Sydney
- The Gipsy Princess
- The Dubarry (July 1934) – Theatre Royal, Adelaide
- Music in the Air (July 1934) – Theatre Royal, Adelaide
- Roberta (Marc 1935) – Theatre Royal, Sydney
- High Jinks (May 1935) – Theatre Royal, Sydney
- Ball at the Savoy (July 1935) – Adelaide
- A Southern Maid (1937)
- The Merry Widow – with Gladys Moncrieff
