= Heather Wilde =

British actress (fl. 1938–1950)

Heather Wilde is an English actress who was active in stage and screen productions in both England and the United States between the late 1930s and 1950s. In films she was often cast in small uncredited roles. Wilde is perhaps best known today for her performances as a supporting character in two popular, critically acclaimed American comedies: as the primping little actress Miss Plupp in The Bank Dick (1940) starring W. C. Fields and as the anxious housemaid Annie in Life with Father (1947) starring William Powell and Irene Dunne.

== Stage and film ==
In its December 8, 1940 issue, The Philadelphia Inquirer carries a news item that provides some background information on Wilde:

Heather Wilde, English actress, is making her American screen debut in "The Bank Dick" now at the Earle [Theatre]. She has been but a short time in America. Previously she had four years experience on the English stage and screen. To the fact she stands but 4 feet, 11 inches in her stocking feet Miss Wilde owes her first American studio engagement. She was chosen for the current role because the character was supposed to be very diminutive. In the sequences in "The Bank Dick" of a motion picture within the picture, Miss Wilde is seen as an actress playing opposite 6-foot, 2-inch Reed Hadley. The sequence is played for comedy, with W. C. Fields as a film director.

== Selected filmography ==
- The Divorce of Lady X (1938): Maid (uncredited)
- The Bank Dick (1940): Miss Plupp
- Confirm or Deny (1941): Telephone operator (uncredited)
- Eagle Squadron (1942): WAAF member (uncredited)
- Counter-Espionage (1942): Gertie Barrow (uncredited)
- The Undying Monster (1942): Millie (uncredited)
- Sherlock Holmes Faces Death (1943): Jenny (uncredited)
- The Lodger (1944): Mary Bowles (uncredited)
- Kitty (1945): Lil
- The Imperfect Lady (1947): maid (uncredited)
- Life with Father (1947): Annie
- The Ghost and Mrs. Muir (1947): maid (uncredited)
- The Lone Wolf in London (1947): maid (uncredited)
- Fighter Squadron (1948): Corine (uncredited)
- The Fighting O'Flynn (1949): barmaid (uncredited)
- Last Holiday (1950): Maggie
