= The Bank Dick =

1940 American comedy film starring W. C. Fields

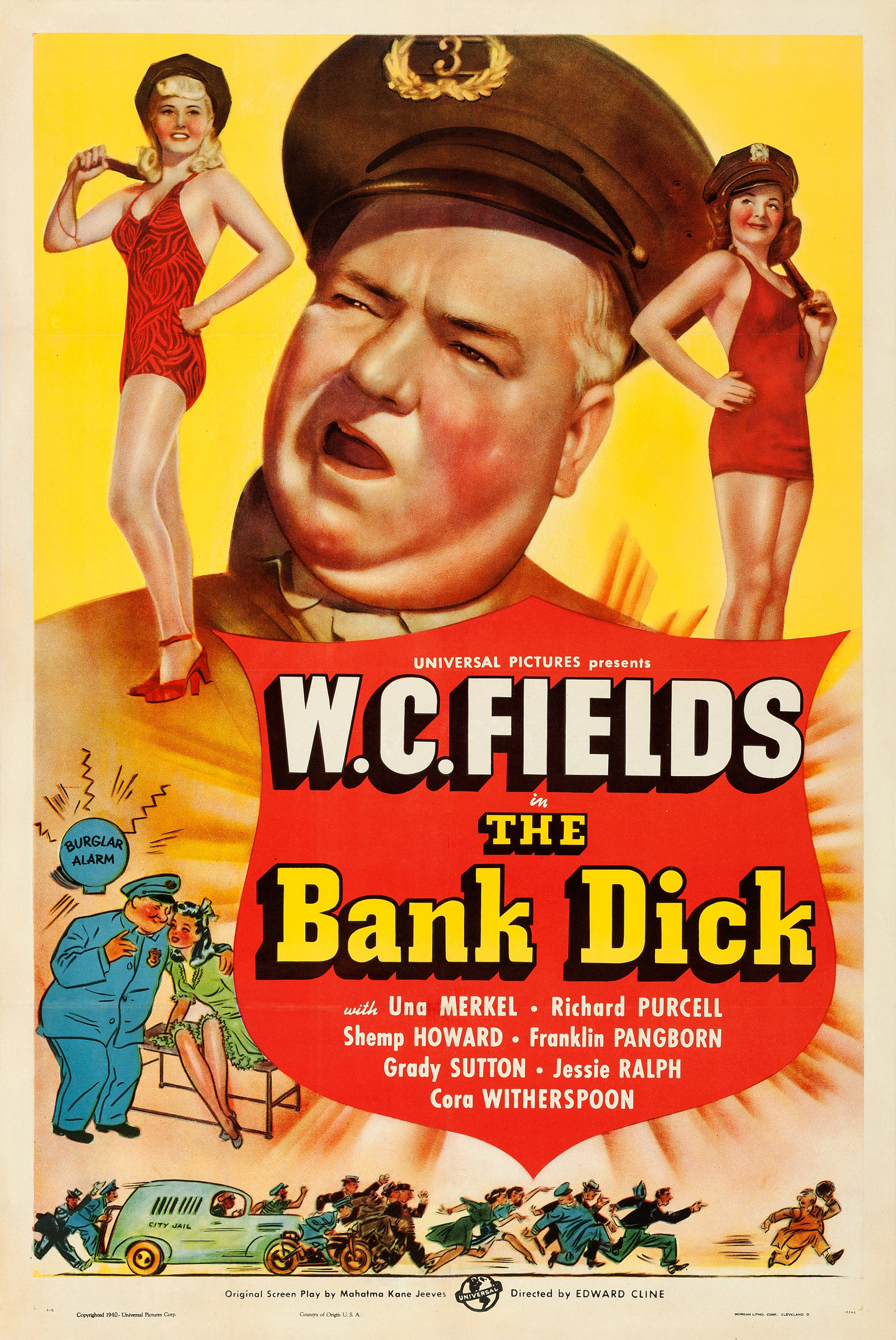
- Theatrical release poster, Style C
- Directed by: Edward F. Cline; Ralph Ceder (collaborating dir.)
- Screenplay by: W. C. Fields (Note: credited as "Mahatma Kane Jeeves"); Richard A. Carroll (dialogue)
- Starring: W. C. Fields; Shemp Howard
- Cinematography: Milton R. Krasner
- Edited by: Arthur Hilton
- Music by: Charles Previn
- Production company: Universal Pictures
- Distributed by: Universal Pictures
- Release date: November 29, 1940 (US)
- Running time: 73–74 minutes
- Country: United States
- Language: English

The Bank Dick, released as The Bank Detective in the United Kingdom, is a 1940 American comedy film starring W. C. Fields. Set in Lompoc, California, (Note: Residents of Lompoc were upset at the presentation of their town in the film, and by Fields' pronunciation of it as "Lom-pock" instead of the proper "Lom-poke".) Fields plays Egbert Sousé, a drunk who accidentally thwarts a bank robbery and ends up a bank security guard as a result.

The film was written by Fields, using the alias Mahatma Kane Jeeves (derived from the Broadway drawing-room comedy cliché "My hat, my cane, Jeeves!"), and directed by Edward F. Cline. The film also stars Una Merkel, Richard Purcell, Shemp Howard, Franklin Pangborn, Grady Sutton, Jessie Ralph and Cora Witherspoon.

In 1992, The Bank Dick was selected for preservation in the United States National Film Registry by the Library of Congress as being "culturally, historically, or aesthetically significant."

== Plot ==
In a somewhat frowsy home in Lompoc, Egbert Sousé (soused), a hard-drinking, henpecked family man, has strained relations with his slattern wife and waspish mother-in-law over his drinking, smoking and habit of taking money from the piggy bank of his youngest daughter, Elsie Mae and replacing it with IOUs. Sousé prefers to spend his days reading detective stories and patronizing his favorite saloon, the Black Pussy Cat Café and Snack Bar, run by Joe Guelpe. Sousé is on his way to the saloon when Elsie Mae bounces a ketchup bottle off of his head; Sousé attempts to hit her with a potted palm tree but is interrupted when Myrtle, his eldest daughter arrives and introduces him to her fiancé, Og Oggilby, who is employed as a bank teller.

At the Black Pussy Cat Café and Snack Bar, film producer Mackley Q Greene is vexed when A. Pismo Clam (Pismo clam), the director of a movie being filmed in town, goes on a bender. When Sousé brags about having directed great silent film comedians, Greene offers him the directing job. Later, the Lompoc Bank where Og works, is robbed and Sousé is mistakenly credited with catching Loudmouth McNasty, one of the two robbers. Mr. Skinner, the president of the bank, rewards Sousé by giving him a job as the bank's "special officer," a bank detective ("dick").

Back at the Black Pussy Cat Café and Snack Bar, a swindler named J. Frothingham Waterbury cons Sousé into investing in a questionable mining operation. Sousé convinces Og to borrow (steal) $500 from the bank to buy the stock; expecting to receive his annual bonus in four days, Og intends to return the borrowed money, but bank examiner J. Pinkerton Snoopington arrives unexpectedly to immediately audit the books. In an attempt to prevent the audit, Sousé invites Snoopington to the Black Pussy Cat Café and Snack Bar, where he has Joe slip him a mickey. Immediately, Snoopington becomes deathly ill and Sousé helps the inebriated bank examiner back to his hotel room where he telephones Dr. Stall, a quack, who examines Snoopington and advises three days of bed rest. Still feeling extremely ill the following day, Snoopington is determined to do his duty and he returns to the bank to proceed with the audit. Og faints when he sees the examiner and Sousé again tries to delay the audit by breaking Snoopington's eyeglasses.

Waterbury the swindler reads in the newspaper that Og's mine has struck it rich. He returns to the bank and offers to buy back the "worthless" stock from Og; but Sousé also reads the same news story and slugs Waterbury, knocking him through a window. Og, suddenly wealthy, is no longer worried about the audit and he agrees to split the money with Sousé; however, the escaped bank robber, Repulsive Rogan returns to rob the bank a second time, taking Sousé hostage and escaping with the bank's money and Og's mining-company stock. Rogan forces Sousé to drive the getaway car and they are followed in another car by the police, the bank president, Og and Greene. A frantic chase ensues as the getaway car, with Sousé at the wheel, narrowly avoids several accidents and continually falls apart. Rogan attempts to jump from the disintegrating car but is knocked unconscious by a low-hanging tree branch. Sousé once again receives the credit for catching the crook and receives a $5,000 reward for the capture of Rogan, $10,000 from producer Mackley Q. Greene for his screen story and a contract to direct a film based on it.

Now an affluent man, Sousé lives in a mansion with his family, all of whom now dress and speak with refinement and treat him with respect, believing he has changed; but each morning at nine o'clock, Sousé continues to leave the house and follows Joe Guelpe to spend the day at the "office" - the Black Pussy Cat Café and Snack Bar.

== Cast ==
- W.C. Fields as Egbert Sousé
- Cora Witherspoon as Agatha Sousé
- Una Merkel as Myrtle Sousé
- Evelyn Del Rio as Elsie Mae Adele Brunch Sousé
- Jessie Ralph as Mrs. Hermisillo Brunch
- Grady Sutton as Og Oggilby
- Franklin Pangborn as J. Pinkerton Snoopington
- Shemp Howard as Joe Guelpe
- Dick Purcell as Mackley Q. Greene
- Russell Hicks as J. Frothingham Waterbury
- Pierre Watkin as Mr. Skinner
- Jack Norton as A. Pismo Clam
- Al Hill as Repulsive Rogan a.k.a. Filthy McNasty
- George Moran as Cozy Cochran a.k.a. Loudmouth McNasty
- Bill Wolfe as Otis
- Pat West as Assistant Director
- Reed Hadley as Francois
- Heather Wilde as Miss Plupp
- Harlan Briggs as Doctor Stall
- Bill Alston as Mr. Cheek

== Production ==
Alternative titles for the film were The Bank Detective and The Great Man. With the success of his two previous films, You Can't Cheat an Honest Man and My Little Chickadee, Fields was able to demand complete creative control. He wrote the script under the pseudonym of Mahatma Kane Jeeves. Principal photography began at Universal Studios in early September 1940. Parts of the film were shot on location in Lompoc, California.

== Reception ==
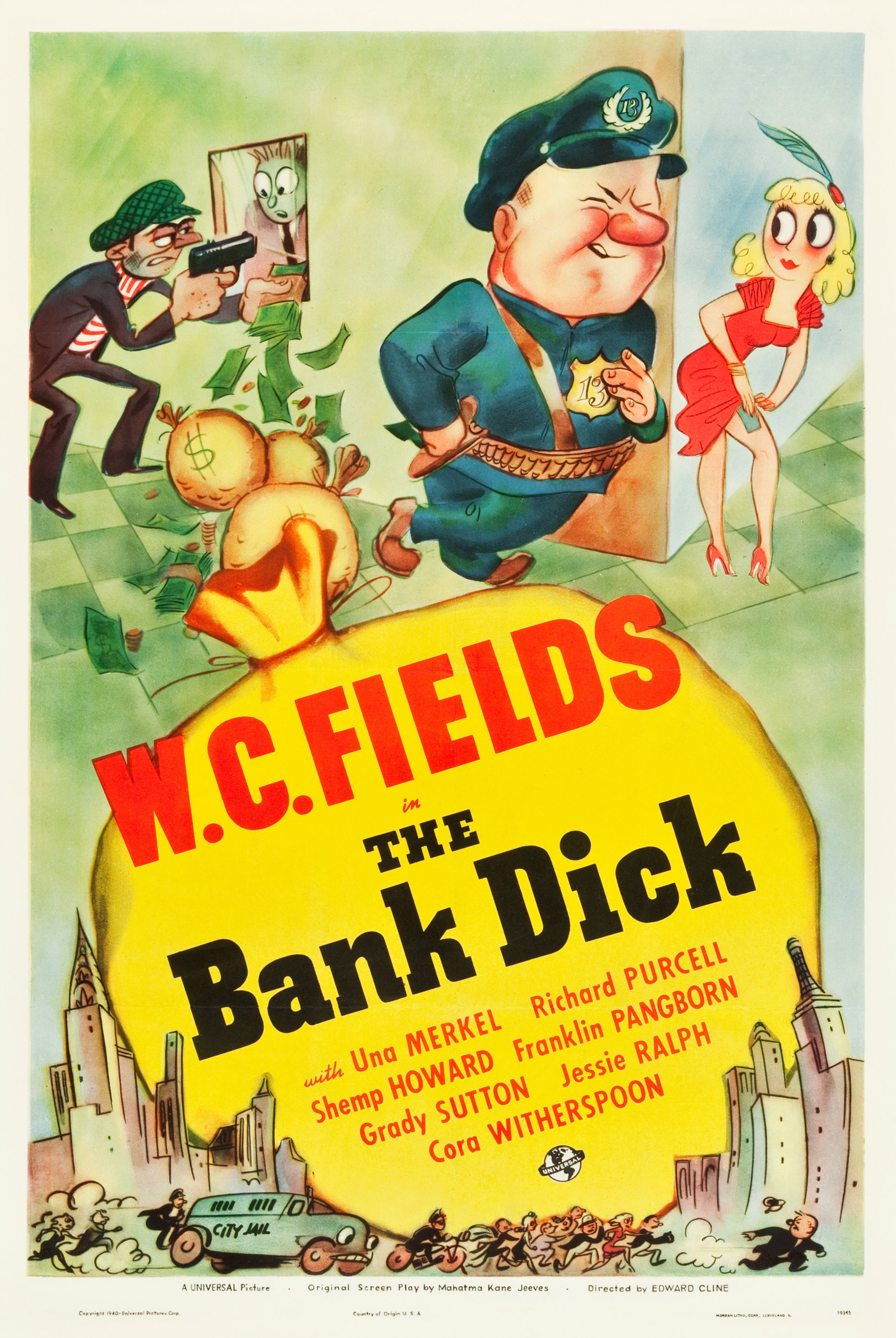
Theatrical release poster, Style D

The Bank Dick received many favorable reviews. Bosley Crowther of the New York Times wrote that "for anyone who simply likes to laugh at the reckless inanities of an inspired buffoon, we recommend The Bank Dick. It's great fun." A reviewer for Variety wrote: "It's a crazy-quilt pattern aiming for laughs, and achieves the purpose adequately. Several times, Fields reaches into satirical pantomime reminiscent of Charlie Chaplin's best effort in that line during Mutual and Essanay days." James Agee lauded the film: "The talkies brought one great comedian, the late, majestically lethargic W. C. Fields, who could not possibly have worked as well in silence; he was the toughest and most warmly human of all screen comedians, and It's a Gift and The Bank Dick, fiendishly funny and incisive white-collar comedies, rank high among the best comedies (and best movies) ever made."

Harrison's Reports called the film "[a] good program comedy. W.C. Fields is at his best and for that reason the picture should go over very well with his fans." John Mosher of The New Yorker wrote that "there is often an incident or gesture reminiscent of the Mack Sennett comedies. At times, the movie even smacks of those old days so exactly that you almost believe it must be a revival of some classic. There's nothing antiquated about it, however, no stale, museum starchiness, and the scandalous Mr. Fields has to be forgiven his outrageous behavior, since he is so simply and honestly funny." Film critic Leslie Halliwell deemed the film "[i]mperfect, but probably the best Fields vehicle there is" and W.C. Fields biographer Robert Lewis Taylor called it "[o]ne of the great classics of American comedy."

However, Otis Ferguson, a reviewer for the New Republic, wrote: "When [Fields] is funny he is terrific...but the story is makeshift, the other characters are stock types, the only pace discernible is the distance between drinks or the rhythm of the fleeting seconds it takes Fields to size up trouble and duck the hell out."

The film has a rating of 100% on Rotten Tomatoes based on 21 reviews. In a list submitted to Cinema magazine in 1963, noted director Stanley Kubrick named it his eighth-favorite film.

One scene from the film, where Fields asks a bartender: "Was I in here last night and did I spend a twenty-dollar bill?" ($467.82 in 2025) and expressing relief that he did, because: "Oh, what a load that is off my mind. I thought I LOST it.", has become classic. The line is often quoted in context of the film.

== Releases ==
The film was released on DVD by The Criterion Collection but has since been out of print.

The film was released on Blu-ray by Kino Lorber.
