= Phantom Raiders =

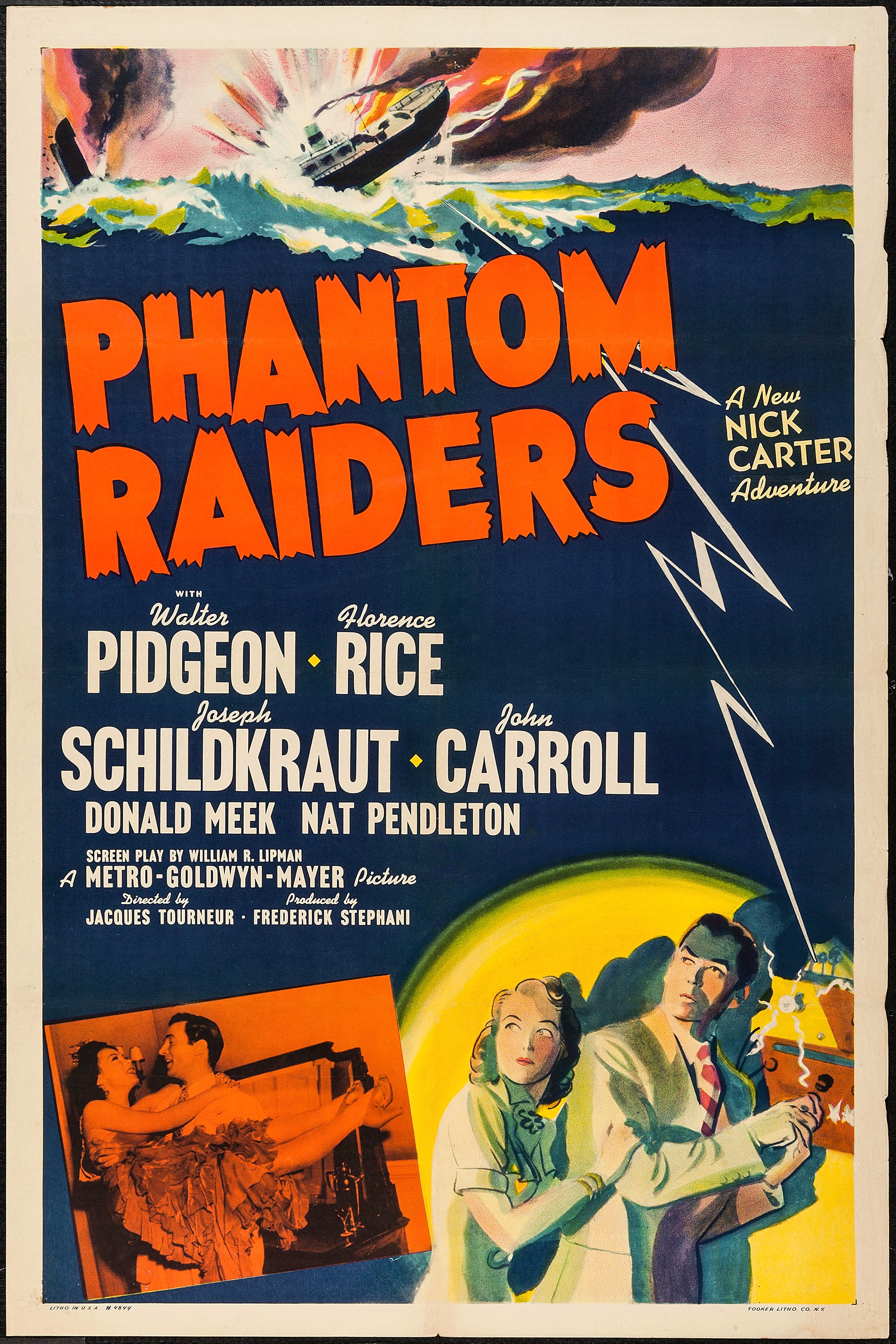
- Film poster
- Directed by: Jacques Tourneur
- Written by: William R. Lipman (screenplay); Jonathan Latimer (story); Joseph Fields
- Based on: Nick Carter (literary character)
- Produced by: Frederick Stephani
- Starring: Walter Pidgeon
- Cinematography: Clyde De Vinna
- Edited by: Conrad A. Nervig
- Music by: David Snell
- Production company: Metro-Goldwyn-Mayer
- Distributed by: Loew's Inc.
- Release date: June 7, 1940 (USA)
- Running time: 70 minutes
- Country: United States
- Language: English
- Budget: $217,000
- Box office: $457,000

Phantom Raiders is a 1940 film, the second in the series starring Walter Pidgeon as detective Nick Carter. The film was part of a movie trilogy based on original stories featuring the character from the long-running Nick Carter, Detective literary series. In the heightened tensions prior to World War II, Hollywood produced many films in the spy film genre such as Phantom Raiders.

Phantom Raiders followed the first film in the series, Nick Carter, Master Detective (1939) and led to Sky Murder (1941), the last of the Nick Carter films. (Note: After appearing on Broadway, Walter Pidgeon returned to Hollywood, but was relegated to playing secondary roles in films like Saratoga (1937) and The Girl of the Golden West (1938). Taking a leading man role in the Nick Carter series was an opportunity to build his profile with MGM.)

== Plot ==
While on vacation in Panama, international insurance firm, Llewelyn's of London approaches detective Nick Carter (Walter Pidgeon) and sidekick "Beeswax" Bartholemew (Donald Meek) for a special assignment. After a Scotland Yard agent (John Burton) is killed investigating sabotage of merchant ships in the Panama Canal, the insurance company become alarmed.

Carter is, at first, apprehensive and turns down the contract. Once he discovers that lovely Cora Barnes (Florence Rice) works as a dispatcher for the Morris Shipping Company, one of the companies that is being attacked, his attitude changes.

Assisted by Bartholomew, Nick soon learns who is behind the mysterious sinkings. Al Taurez (Joseph Schildkraut), an American gangster who has moved his operations to Panama, is running a marine insurance racket. When a ship is declared missing, Taurez collects the insurance on the ship's falsified cargo.

After Nick learns that Cora is engaged to John Ramsell Jr. (John Carroll), the rich son of a shipping company owner, he decides to quit but then changes his mind, when he receives an anonymous threat instructing him to leave Panama at once or face certain death.

Later, when Nick confronts Eddie Anders (Dwight Frye), one of Taurez' gang, forcing him to reveal Taurez is behind the murder plot. Nick learns that Cora is supplying information to Taurez on ships passing through the Panama Canal, and that Ramsell Sr. has also been coerced into signing indemnity claims for Taurez whenever one of his father's ships is sunk.

With the help of Bartholomew posing as a maddened gunman, Taurez is held hostage and Nick searches the gangster's office to find a remote control detonator used to send high frequency radio signals that explode bombs hidden on ships. When Nick activates the device, the building next door, the explosives lab, blows up.

Taurez and his partner, Dr. Grisson (Thomas W. Ross), who have taken over the Morris Company, attempt to force company owner, Franklin Morris (Cecil Kellaway) to order Ramsell Jr., to send the next ship through the canal, Morris refuses, then is stabbed by a someone hidden in the shadows.

Ramsell Jr., is arrested for the murder, but Nick soon unravels the racket making Taurez go aboard a ship as it is about to be blown up. With only moments to spare before Grisson will act, Taurez confesses to Nick, and, along with Grisson, is arrested.

== Cast ==
- Walter Pidgeon as Nick Carter
- Donald Meek as Bartholomew
- Joseph Schildkraut as Al Taurez
- Florence Rice as Cora Barnes
- Nat Pendleton as "Gunboat" Jacklin
- John Carroll as John Ramsell Jr
- Steffi Duna as Dolores
- Cecil Kellaway as Franklin Morris
- Matthew Boulton as John Ramsell Sr
- Alec Craig as Andy MacMillan
- Thomas W. Ross as Dr. Grisson
- Dwight Frye as Eddie Anders
- John Burton as Steve Donnigan
- Holmes Herbert as Sir Edward
- Harry Tyler as Waiter
- Hugh Beaumont as Seaman
- Nestor Paiva as Inspector
- John Burton as Scotland Yard agent

== Production ==
Principal photography on Phantom Raiders began early April 1940. Scenes of Panama and the Panama Canal are incorporated into the final production.

== Reception ==
According to MGM records, Phantom Raiders cost £217,000 and earned $285,000 in the US and Canada and $172,000 elsewhere, thereby making a profit.

Film historian and reviewer Leonard Maltin called Phantom Raiders "(a) slick, fast-paced Nick Carter detective entry".

Film historian John Douglas Eames in The MGM Story: The Complete History Of Fifty Roaring Years (1975) described Pigeon's recurring role as sleuth Nick Carter in Phantom Raiders, "a "melo" about sabotage at sea ..." Reviewer Dennis Schwartz in Dennis Swartz' Movie Reviews, considered Phantom Raiders as the best in the series. He also noted that "taut and fast-paced enjoyable programmer", where "(Donald) Meek steals the delightful pic as the comical bee keeper who always pops up when his boss is in danger".
