= Evelyn Del Rio =

American actress

- Born: Evelyn Bernadette Janer; September 22, 1931; Cataño, Puerto Rico
- Died: November 26, 1998 (aged 67); Burbank, California
- Occupation: Actress
- Years active: 1935 - 1950s
- Spouse: Arthur L. Anderson (her death)

Evelyn Del Rio (born Evelyn Bernadette Janer; September 22, 1931 – November 26, 1998) was an American stage and screen actress, best known for her role as Elsie Mae Sousé in The Bank Dick.

She began her professional career at the age of 4 as a dancer billed as the "Latin Shirley Temple.” Until the age of 13 she was a headline dancer at the Cotton Club and the Apollo Theater, whereupon she toured with Carmen Miranda. During World War II she entertained troops for the USO. After the war she appeared uncredited as a young girl in Thrill of a Romance, her final film role. In the early 1950s she retired from entertainment in order to focus on her family. She died in Burbank, California, on November 26, 1998, from complications related to diabetes and a stroke.
