= Kitty (1945 film) =

1945 film by Mitchell Leisen

- Theatrical poster to Kitty (1945)
- Directed by: Mitchell Leisen
- Written by: Karl Tunberg; Darrell Ware
- Based on: novel by Rosamond Marshall
- Produced by: Mitchell Leisen
- Starring: Paulette Goddard; Ray Milland
- Cinematography: Daniel L. Fapp
- Edited by: Alma Macrorie
- Music by: Victor Young
- Distributed by: Paramount Pictures
- Release date: March 31, 1945
- Running time: 103 minutes
- Country: United States
- Language: English
- Budget: $2 million
- Box office: $3.5 million (US rentals)

Kitty is a 1945 film, a costume drama set in London during the 1780s, directed by Mitchell Leisen, based on the novel of the same name by Rosamond Marshall (published in 1943). The screenplay is by Karl Tunberg.

It stars Paulette Goddard, Ray Milland, Constance Collier, Patric Knowles, Reginald Owen, and Cecil Kellaway as the English painter Thomas Gainsborough.

In a broad interpretation of George Bernard Shaw's Pygmalion, the film tells the rags-to-riches story of a beautiful young cockney guttersnipe who is given a complete makeover by an impoverished aristocrat (Milland) and his aunt (Collier). They hope to arrange her marriage to a peer, thereby repairing their fortunes and their social status.

== Plot ==
In 1783 London, a poor thief, Kitty, is caught picking the pocket of painter Thomas Gainsborough. Amused, he pays her to sit for a portrait. While posing, she attracts the attention of Sir Hugh Marcy, who offers her a job as a scullery maid and (later) his aunt's ward. Kitty learns that he is impoverished, having lost his post in the Foreign Office.

All the while, Gainsborough's portrait of Kitty, The Anonymous Lady, creates a stir, as people try to guess the subject's identity. The Duke of Malmunster, who buys the painting, asks Gainsborough about the model. Sir Hugh interjects that she is his aunt's ward. So in exchange for an introduction to Kitty, the Duke offers to have Hugh reinstated in the Foreign Office. But the relationship goes no further than the promised introduction. Meanwhile, Kitty develops an attraction for Hugh—so much so, that when he is sent to debtors' prison, Kitty charms wealthy industrialist Jonathan Selby into marriage, using her dowry to free Hugh. But he and his aunt once again go broke. Kitty breaks into her husband's strongbox to bail them out of trouble, but Selby beats her. He dies at the hands of Kitty's loyal maid.

As a result, Kitty inherits a large fortune. She desires happiness with Hugh, but he is determined that she marry the Duke of Malmunster so that Hugh can reclaim his career. Kitty gives in. After the honeymoon, the duke announces that Kitty is pregnant (though the father was the late Selby). After the birth of the boy, the old duke dies, leaving Kitty extremely wealthy.

After she has a respectable mourning period, Hugh attempts to arrange a third marriage for Kitty, this time to the Prince of Wales. But Kitty says that she has already married twice out of love for him. Unimpressed, Hugh replies that he considers their relationship a business arrangement, nothing more.

Meanwhile, Kitty becomes engaged to Hugh's close friend, the Earl of Carstairs. Seeing them together, Hugh realizes he actually is in love with Kitty. The Earl, ever the gentleman, chooses not to stand in the way of Hugh's happiness. So in the end, Hugh and Kitty are free to affirm their mutual devotion.

== Cast ==
- Paulette Goddard as Kitty. To acquire a Cockney accent, Goddard shared a room for a time with the mother of actress Ida Lupino, who had a very pronounced one. She learned upper-class diction from Constance Collier. Upon seeing this film, the director Jean Renoir decided to cast Goddard in his film The Diary of a Chambermaid.
- Ray Milland as Sir Hugh Marcy
- Patric Knowles as Brett, Earl of Carstairs
- Reginald Owen as Duke of Malmunster
- Cecil Kellaway as Thomas Gainsborough
- Constance Collier as Lady Susan Dowitt, Sir Hugh's aunt
- Dennis Hoey as Jonathan Selby
- Sara Allgood as Old Meg, the head of the thieving band to which Kitty belongs at the beginning
- Eric Blore as Dobson, Sir Hugh's servant
- Gordon Richards as Sir Joshua Reynolds
- Michael Dyne as H. R. H. The Prince of Wales
- Edgar Norton as Earl of Campton
- Patricia Cameron as Elaine Carlisle
- Percival Vivian as Dr. Holt
- Mary Gordon as Nanny
- Anita Sharp-Bolster as Mullens (credited as Anita Bolster)
- Heather Wilde as Lil
- Charles Coleman as Majordomo
- Mae Clarke as Molly
- Al Ferguson as Footman (uncredited)
- Gibson Gowland as Prison Guard (uncredited)
- Douglas Walton as Philip (uncredited)

== Production ==
The film was based on the 1943 novel Kitty by American Rosamond Marshall. Film rights were bought by Paramount prior to the novel's publication for a reported $50,000.

In October 1943, Paramount announced they would make the film with Paulette Goddard and Ray Milland, with Karl Turnberg and Darrell Ware to write and produce. The novel was published that month.

The New York Times described the released film as being "robust entertainment". By January 1946, the book had sold almost 900,000 copies.

In the original novel, Kitty was a prostitute. The Breen Office, who handled censorship at the time, ruled if this was to be kept in the film version, Kitty would have to die at the end for punishment. The story was changed so Kitty was a pickpocket.

In March 1944, Mitchell Leisen was announced as the director and Cecil Kellaway was cast as Gainsborough.

Director Leisen worked very hard with the set and costume designers to create a historically correct picture of 18th-century England. The California portrait painter Theodore Lukits served as technical adviser for the film's artistic scenes and painted the portrait of Kitty that is seen in the film. Lukits knew Ray Milland because he had painted his wife's portrait in 1942.

Goddard was coached in her cockney accent by Connie Lupino, mother of Ida Lupino.

In May 1944, before filming began, Goddard signed a new contract with Paramount to make two films a year over seven years.

Filming started in May 1944. Leisen reportedly spent over $25,000 on recreations of Gainsborough portraits. Goddard made the film after returning from entertaining the troops in India and Burma. Milland made it immediately prior to The Lost Weekend.

The ending of the film was re-shot in December 1944.

== Reception ==
=== Box office ===
The film earned over $3 million at the North American box office.

=== Awards ===
The film was nominated for one Oscar for Best Art Direction-Interior Decoration, Black-and-White (Hans Dreier, Walter H. Tyler, Samuel M. Comer, Ray Moyer).

== Radio adaptation ==
Kitty was presented on Hollywood Players on CBS November 5, 1946. The adaptation starred Paulette Goddard.
