= The Notorious Lone Wolf =

1946 film by D. Ross Lederman

- Theatrical release poster
- Directed by: D. Ross Lederman
- Screenplay by: Martin Berkeley; Edward Dein
- Story by: William J. Bowers
- Based on: Lone Wolf by Louis Joseph Vance
- Produced by: Ted Richmond
- Starring: Gerald Mohr; Janis Carter; Eric Blore
- Cinematography: Burnett Guffey
- Edited by: Richard Fantl
- Music by: Mischa Bakaleinikoff
- Production company: Columbia Pictures
- Distributed by: Columbia Pictures
- Release date: February 1946
- Running time: 64 minutes
- Country: United States
- Language: English

The Notorious Lone Wolf is a 1946 American mystery film directed by D. Ross Lederman and starring Gerald Mohr, Janis Carter and Eric Blore. It is the twelfth Lone Wolf film produced by Columbia Pictures. The picture features Mohr in his inaugural performance as the protagonist detective Lone Wolf alongside Janis Carter and Ian Wolfe as Adam Wainwright, the film's antagonist. The screenplay was written by Martin Berkeley, Edward Dein, and William J. Bowers.

The film centres on former jewel looter Michael Lanyard, also known by his alias "Lone Wolf", aiming to clear his name after he is accused of murdering a bar dancer. At the same time, he races to retrieve a stolen piece of jewellery. Filming took place in October and November 1945. The Notorious Lone Wolf was theatrically released in the United States in February 1946. It was followed by The Lone Wolf in Mexico, in 1947.

== Plot ==
Having left the Army, reformed jewel thief and current detective Michael Lanyard, or the Lone Wolf, returns to New York from England to find his lover Carla Winter. On the way, he is tipped off by Inspector Crane of the theft of the Shalimar, a diamond co-owned by the Prince of Rapur and Lal Bara. It is revealed that the jewel thief is Stonely, owner of a bar.

Meanwhile, Winter's sister Rita requests Lanyard's help. Her husband, Dick Hale, has been cheating on his wife and is having an affair with Lilli, a performer at Stonely's bar. The Lone Wolf and Hale go to the bar together, only to find Lilli murdered. Lanyard is pinpointed by the suspicious police as the perpetrator. He manages to escape and sets out to find the mastermind. Disguised as the Rapurian prince, Lanyard meets jeweller Adam Wainwright, who promises to retrieve the stolen Shalimar in exchange for a promised reward.

Lanyard quickly receives news from Wainwright that he has found the looted piece of jewellery. However, it is swiped by Stonely when Lanyard meets Wainwright at the latter's shop. The Lone Wolf alerts the police; both Stonely and Wainwright are caught, with the jeweller being found guilty of murdering Lilli. Lanyard returns home to Winter but their residence catches fire halfway into their lovemaking so as to end the intimacy in accordance with the prevailing censorship rules of the time.

== Cast ==
- Gerald Mohr as Michael Lanyard / The Lone Wolf
- Janis Carter as Carla Winter
- Eric Blore as Jameson
- John Abbott as Lal Bara
- William B. Davidson as Inspector Crane
- Don Beddoe as Stonley
- Adele Roberts as Rita Hale
- Mark Roberts as Dick Hale
- Peter Whitney as Harvey Beaumont
- Ian Wolfe as Adam Wheelright
- Edith Evanson as Olga, Carla's Maid
- Olaf Hytten as Prince of Rapur
- Virginia Hunter as Lili, Nightclub Dancer
- John Tyrrell as Pierre, the Chauffeur
- Eddie Acuff as Detective Jones
- Eddy Chandler as House Detective

== Production ==
After a sickly Warren William decided to stop playing the title character, Gerald Mohr was brought in by Columbia Pictures, the production company and the distributor, to replace William. Mohr had previously acted as a minor figure in One Dangerous Night (1943), the ninth Lone Wolf film. Eric Blore continued playing Lanyard's butler Jamison, his ninth time doing so, while Janis Carter acted as Lanyard's lover. A kissing scene between Carter's character and Mohr's one was described as "daring" for the time period.

While still a work-in-progress, the film was referred to as The Lone Wolf on Broadway. D. Ross Lederman served as director of the film. Ted Richmond was in charge of production for Columbia Pictures, while Martin Berkeley and Edward Dein wrote the screenplay based on a story by William J. Bowers. Burnett Guffey signed on as cinematographer. The set decorator was Frank Kramer. Mischa Bakaleinikoff headed the musical direction, and Richard Fantl edited the film. Principal photography officially began on October 22, 1945, and ended on November 5, 1945.

== Release ==
The Notorious Lone Wolf opened in American cinemas in February 1946. A reviewer for the magazine Variety lauded the "high-polished routine material" by the "able cast". In evaluating the film in his 2012 book Columbia Pictures Movie Series, 1926—1955: The Harry Cohn Years, Gene Blottner expressed disappointment at most of the cast's acting skills. He wrote that the comedy in the film was "clumsy and forced" and it was only a "so-so effort in the renewal of the Lone Wolf series."

== Bibliography ==
- Gene Blottner (2012). Columbia Pictures Movie Series, 1926—1955: The Harry Cohn Years. McFarland. ISBN 978-0-7864-3353-7.
- Geoff Mayer (2012). Historical Dictionary of Crime Films. Scarecrow Press. ISBN 978-0-8108-6769-7.
- Phil Hardy (1997). The BFI Companion to Crime. Continuum. ISBN 978-0-304-33215-1.
