= Eric Blore =

English actor (1887–1959)

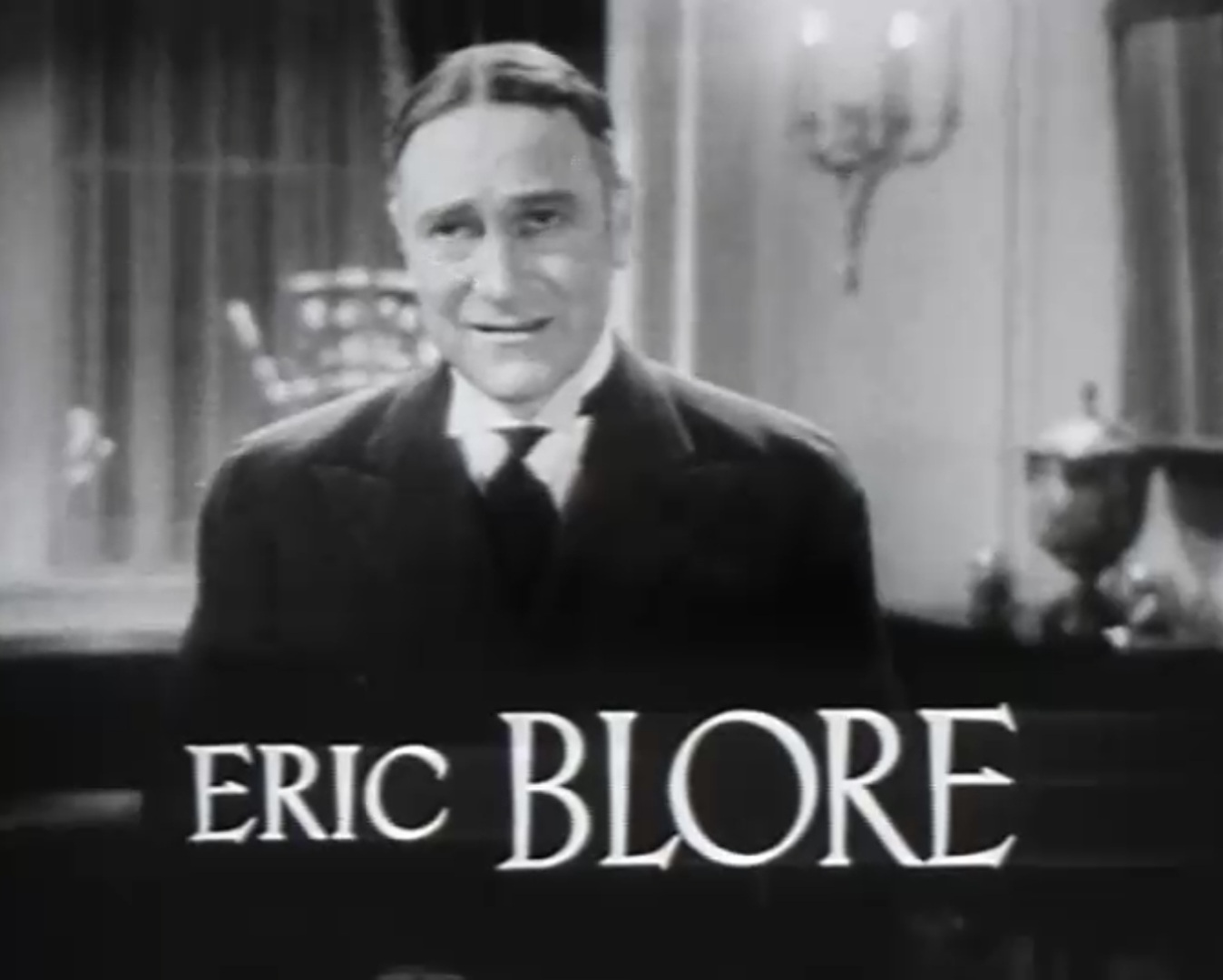
- Blore in the trailer for It's Love I'm After (1937)
- Born: 23 December 1887; Finchley, Middlesex, England
- Died: 2 March 1959 (aged 71); Hollywood, California, U.S.
- Occupation: Actor
- Years active: 1920–1955
- Spouses: Violet Winter (m. 1917; died 1919) Clara Blore (m. 1926)

Eric Blore Sr. (23 December 1887 – 2 March 1959) was an English actor and writer. His early stage career, mostly in the West End, centred on revue and musical comedy, but also included straight plays. He wrote sketches for and appeared in variety.

In the 1930s Blore acted mostly in Broadway productions. He made his last London appearance in 1933 in the Fred Astaire hit Gay Divorce.

Between 1930 and 1955 he made more than 60 Hollywood films, becoming particularly well known for playing butlers and other superior domestic servants. He co-starred with Fred Astaire in six movies, Flying Down to Rio (1933), The Gay Divorcee (1934), Top Hat (1935), Swing Time (1936), Shall We Dance (1937), The Sky's the Limit (1943).

He retired in 1956 for health reasons, and died in Hollywood in 1959 at the age of 71.

== Life and career ==
=== Early years ===
Blore was born in Finchley, a north London suburb, on 23 December 1887, to Henry Blore and his wife Mary, née Newton. He was educated at Mills School, Finchley, and after leaving school he worked for an insurance company.

He was drawn to a theatrical career, and in 1908 he made his debut on the stage at the Spa Theatre, Bridlington in the musical comedy The Girl from Kays. In the same year he went to Australia, where he appeared with a concert party, "The Merrymakers". In the English provinces he appeared in the musical comedy The Arcadians (1910), the pierrot show The March Hares (1911) and Barry Jackson and Basil Dean's Fifinella (1912). In April 1913 Blore made his first appearance in London, at the Empire, Leicester Square in C.H. Bovill's revue All the Winners, in which he was praised by The Observer. He also appeared at the Empire in Bovill's and P.G. Wodehouse's revue Nuts and Wine (1914).

During the First World War, Blore enlisted and served in the South Wales Borderers and later joined the Royal Flying Corps, before being assigned to run the 38th Divisional Concert Party in France ("The Welsh Wails") (1917–1919).

Blore wrote several sketches for revue and variety, including "Violet and Pink" (1913); "A Burlington Arcadian" (1914); "The Admirable Fleming" (1917); "Yes, Papa" (1921); "French Beans" (1921) and his most enduring sketch, "The Disorderly Room", written while he was in the Army, and first given in London by Stanley Holloway, Tom Walls, Leslie Henson, Jack Buchanan and the author. It was taken up by Tommy Handley, who starred in it in music halls around the country and on BBC radio in the 1920s and '30s.

=== West End and Broadway ===
In the early 1920s Blore toured in variety and appeared in the West End in Angel Face (1922), a "musical farce" with music by Victor Herbert, heading a cast that included Sylvia Cecil and the young Miles Malleson, and The Cabaret Girl, joining the cast in mid-run.

In August 1923 Blore appeared for the first time on Broadway, playing the Hon. Bertie Bird in Little Miss Bluebeard, and on his return to London he appeared in the same part at Wyndham's Theatre. After the death of his first wife, Violet (née Winter), Blore married Clara Macklin in 1926. In the same year he returned to New York, playing Teddie Deakin in The Ghost Train. The play, which ran in London for 655 performances did less well on Broadway, and closed after 61 performances. Blore remained in the US for the next seven years; his Broadway roles were Reggie Ervine in Mixed Doubles, Sir Calverton Shipley in Just Fancy, Sir Basil Carraway in Here's Howe, the King of Arcadia in Angela, Captain Robert Holt in Meet the Prince, Lieutenant Cooper in Roar China, Bertie Capp in Give Me Yesterday and Roddy Trotwood in Here Goes the Bride. In 1932 he toured as Cosmo Perry in The Devil Passes, before returning to Broadway to play the waiter in Cole Porter's Gay Divorce, which starred Fred Astaire and Claire Luce.

Gay Divorce ran for 248 performances, closing in July 1933, to allow Astaire and Luce to go to London to play in the piece at the Palace Theatre. Blore and Erik Rhodes from the Broadway cast also appeared in the London production, which ran for five months. This was Blore's last London stage show. As The Times put it, he joined "the select company of English actors who were persuaded to journey to California" to appear in Hollywood films, along with the likes of C. Aubrey Smith and Ronald Colman.

=== Hollywood ===
Blore made more than 60 films between 1930 and 1955. He was particularly known for playing condescending butlers, valets and gentlemen's gentlemen. The Times commented that he and another English actor, Arthur Treacher, "made a virtual corner in butler parts … no study of an upper class English or American household was complete without one or other of them". Treacher was tall and thin with a haughty and austere manner; Blore was "shorter and slightly tubby … a trifle more eccentric in manner but equally capable of registering eloquent but unspoken disapproval". His less lofty air enabled him to deliver the line, "If I were not a gentleman's gentleman I could be such a cad's cad."

In 1943 Blore returned to Broadway, replacing Treacher during the run of Ziegfeld Follies, and made his final stage appearance at Los Angeles in September 1945, playing Charles Mannering in the unsuccessful Tchaikovsky-based musical Song Without Words.

Blore retired after suffering a stroke in 1956. Taken ill in February 1959 he was moved from his Hollywood home to the Motion Picture Country Hospital, where he died of a heart attack on 1 March, aged 71. He was survived by his widow, Clara, a son, Eric Jr., and one grandchild.

== Filmography ==
Source: British Film Institute.

Film	Role
Laughter (1930)	angel in party scene
Tarnished Lady (1931)	jewellery counter clerk
Flying Down to Rio (1933)	Butterbass, Hammerstein's assistant
The Gay Divorcee (1934)	waiter
Behold My Wife! (1934)	Benson
Limehouse Blues (1934)	slummer
Folies Bergère de Paris (1935)	François
The Good Fairy (1935)	Dr. Metz
Old Man Rhythm (1935)	Phillips
Top Hat (1935)	Bates, Hardwick's valet
Diamond Jim (1935)	Sampson Fox
I Dream Too Much (1935)	Roger Briggs
Seven Keys to Baldpate (1935)	Prof. Harrison Boulton
The Ex-Mrs. Bradford (1936)	Stokes
Sons o' Guns (1936)	Hobson
Piccadilly Jim (1936)	Bayliss
Swing Time (1936)	Gordon
Smartest Girl in Town (1936)	Lucius Philbean, Dick's valet
Quality Street (1937)	recruiting sergeant
The Soldier and the Lady (1937)	Blount
Shall We Dance (1937)	Cecil Flintridge
It's Love I'm After (1937)	Digges
Breakfast for Two (1937)	Butch, blair's valet
Hitting a New High (1937)	Cedric Cosmo, aka Captain Braceridge Hemingway
Joy of Living (1938)	Potter, the butler
Swiss Miss (1938)	Edward Morton
A Gentleman's Gentleman (1939)	Heppelwhite
Island of Lost Men (1939)	Herbert
The Lone Wolf Strikes (1940)	Jamison
South of Suez	Harold 'Limey' Wemsley
'Til We Meet Again (1940)	Sir Harold Pinchard
The Lone Wolf Meets a Lady (1940)	Jamison
The Boys from Syracuse (1940)	Pinch
Earl of Puddlestone (1940)	Horatio Bottomley
The Lady Eve (1941)	Sir Alfred Mcglennan Keith
The Lone Wolf Takes a Chance (1941)	Jamison
Road to Zanzibar (1941)	Charles Kimble
Redhead (1941)	Digby
Lady Scarface (1941)	Mr. Hartford
Confirm or Deny (1941)	Mr. Hobbs
Sullivan's Travels (1941)	Sullivan's valet
The Shanghai Gesture (1941)	Caesar Hawkins, the bookkeeper
Counter-Espionage (1942)	Jamison
The Moon and Sixpence (1942)	Captain Nichols
Happy Go Lucky (1943)	Betsman
One Dangerous Night (1943)	jamison
Forever and a Day (1943)	Sir Anthony's butler
Heavenly Music (1943 short)	Mr. Frisbie
The Sky's the Limit (1943)	Jackson, the butler
Passport to Suez (1943, part of the Lone Wolf series)	Llewellyn Jameson
Holy Matrimony (1943)	Henry Leek
Submarine Base (1943)	Spike
San Diego, I Love You (1944)	Nelson, butler
Easy to Look At (1945)	Billings
Men in Her Diary (1945)	florist
Kitty (1945)	Dobson
I Was a Criminal (1945)	Obermüller, the mayor
The Notorious Lone Wolf (1946)	Jameson
Winter Wonderland (1946)	Luddington
Abie's Irish Rose (1946)	Stubbins
The Lone Wolf in Mexico (1947)	Jamison
The Lone Wolf in London (1947)	Jamison
Romance on the High Seas (1948)	ship's doctor
The Adventures of Ichabod and Mr. Toad (1949 short)	J. Thaddeus Toad (voice)
Love Happy (1949)	Mackinaw
Fancy Pants (1950)	Sir Wimbley
Babes in Bagdad	cast member
Bowery to Bagdad (1955)	genie of the lamp
Once Upon a Studio (2023 short)	J. Thaddeus Toad (voice, archival recordings)

== See also ==
- List of British actors

== Notes and references ==
=== Sources ===
- Herbert, Ian, ed. (1978). Whos Was Who in the Theatre. London and Detroit: Pitman Publishing and Gale Research. OCLC 297602028.
- Holloway, Stanley; Richards, Dick (1967). Wiv a Little Bit o' Luck: The Life Story of Stanley Holloway. London: Frewin. OCLC 3647363.
- Parker, John, ed. (1922). Who's Who in the Theatre (fourth ed.). London: Sir Isaac Pitman and Sons. OCLC 473894893.
