= Gerald Mohr =

American actor (1914–1968)

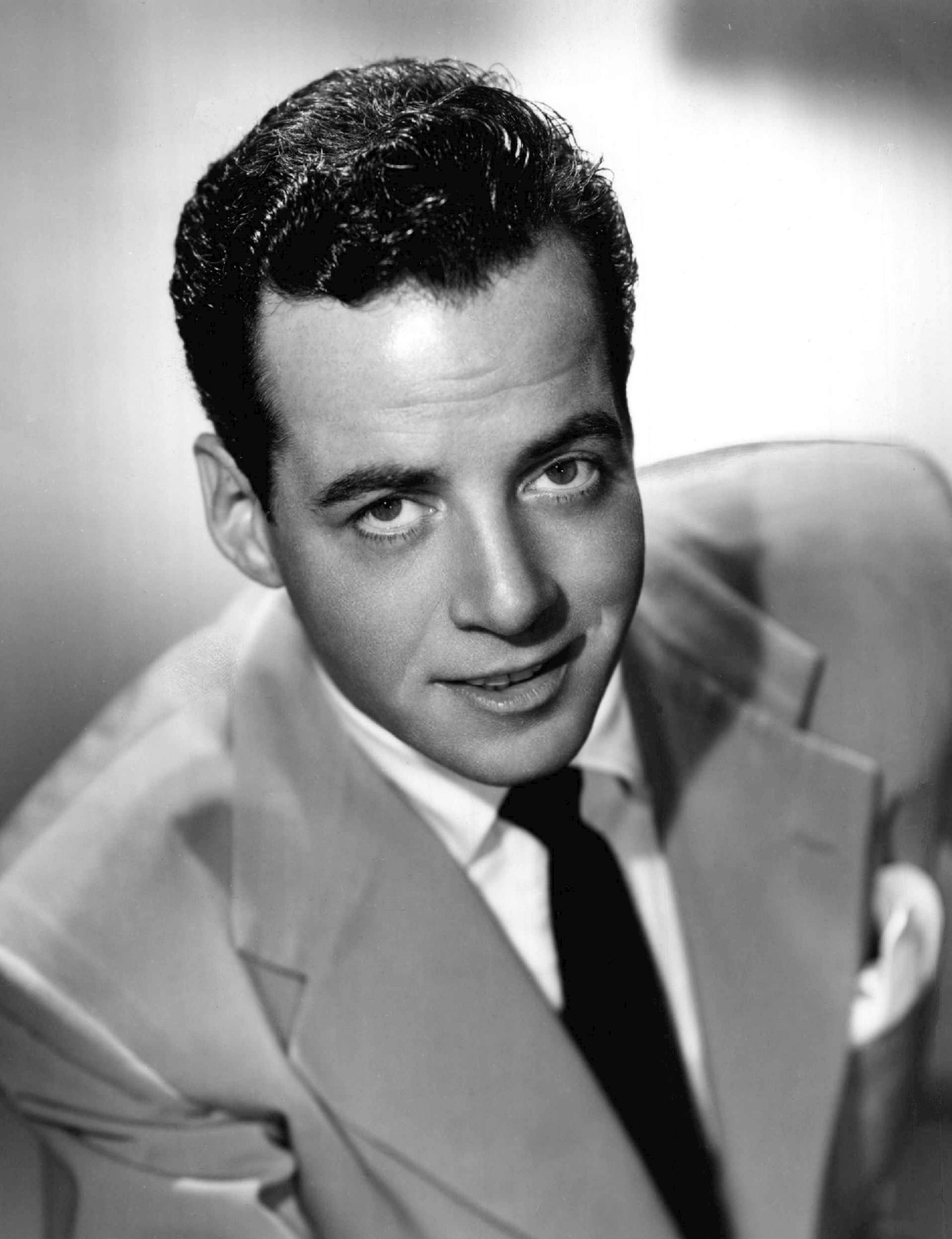
- Mohr in the CBS Radio series The Adventures of Philip Marlowe (1948–1951)
- Born: June 11, 1914; New York City, U.S.
- Died: November 9, 1968 (aged 54); Stockholm, Sweden
- Resting place: Columbarium of Lidingö Cemetery, Sweden
- Occupation: Actor
- Years active: 1935–1968
- Spouses: Rita Deneau (m. 1938; div. 1957) Mai Dietrich (m. 1958)

Gerald "Gerry" Mohr (June 11, 1914 – November 9, 1968) was an American radio, film, and television character actor and frequent leading man, who appeared in more than 500 radio plays, 73 films, and over 100 television shows.

== Early years ==
Mohr was born in Manhattan to Henrietta (née Neustadt), a singer, and Sigmond Mohr. He was educated in Dwight Preparatory School in Manhattan, where he learned to speak French and German and also learned to ride horses and play the piano.

At Columbia University, where he was on a course to become a doctor, Mohr was struck with appendicitis and was recovering in a hospital when another patient, a radio broadcaster, realised Mohr's pleasant baritone voice would be ideal for radio. Mohr was hired by the radio station and became a junior reporter.

== Radio ==
One of Mohr's early starring roles on radio was as a replacement for Matt Crowley for a brief interval in Jungle Jim in 1938. He starred as Raymond Chandler's hardboiled detective, Philip Marlowe, 1948–1951, in 119 half-hour radio plays. He also starred in The Adventures of Bill Lance, and as Michael Lanyard in The Lone Wolf.

He was one of the actors who portrayed Archie Goodwin in The New Adventures of Nero Wolfe, frequently starred in The Whistler, and acted in different roles in multiple episodes of Damon Runyon Theater and Frontier Town. He played multiple roles in the anthology series Crime Is My Pastime and was the narrator for the serial Woman from Nowhere.

Mohr was so ubiquitous that in 1949, "Radio and Television Life" magazine named him as the Best Male Actor on Radio.

Other radio appearances include The Jack Benny Program, Our Miss Brooks, The Shadow of Fu Manchu, Box 13, Escape, Suspense, and Lux Radio Theatre.

In the early 1950s, Mohr made a series of recordings for the Voice of America. Unlike most material for the VOA, these were intended for broadcast by radio stations in the United States, with the goal of debunking propaganda broadcast from behind the Iron Curtain.

== Film ==
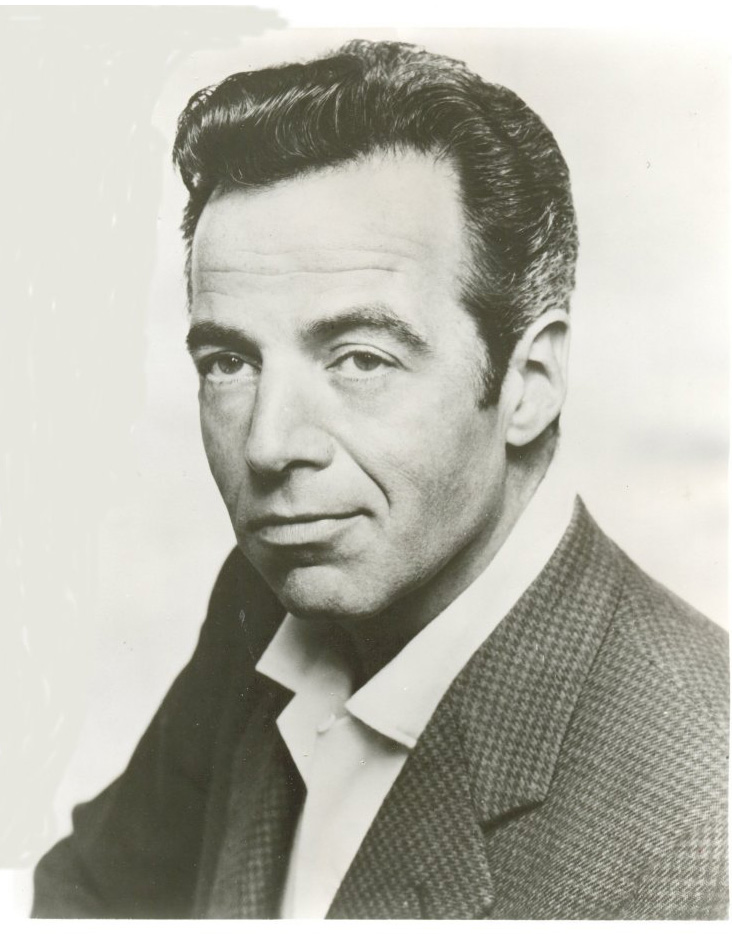
Portrait photograph of Mohr

Mohr began appearing in films in the late 1930s, playing his first villain role in the 15-part cliffhanger serial Jungle Girl (1941). After three years' service in the US Army Air Forces during World War II, he returned to Hollywood, starring as Michael Lanyard in three movies of The Lone Wolf series in 1946–47. He had supporting roles in the film classics Gilda (1946) and Detective Story (1951), and co-starred in The Magnificent Rogue (1946) and The Sniper (1952)

In 1964 Mohr, together with his second wife Mai, planned the formation of an international film company, headquartered in Stockholm, with Swedish and American writers. The company was to have featured comedy, adventure, crime, and drama shows for worldwide distribution. By then fluent in Swedish, he also planned to star in a film for TV in which his character, a newspaperman, would speak only Swedish. In 1964, he made a comedy Western, filmed in Stockholm and on location in Yugoslavia, called Wild West Story in which the good guys spoke Swedish and the bad guys (Mohr, inter alia) spoke in English.

In 1968, he appeared in his last film role as Tom Branca in William Wyler's Funny Girl.

== Television ==
From the 1950s on, he appeared as a guest star in more than 100 television series, including such Westerns as The Californians, Maverick, Johnny Ringo, The Alaskans, Lawman, Cheyenne (as Pat Keogh in episode "Rendezvous at Red Rock"/as Elmer Bostrum in episode "Incident at Dawson Flats"), Bronco, Overland Trail (as James Addison Reavis, "the Baron of Arizona", in the episode "The Baron Comes Back"), Sugarfoot, Bonanza (as Phil Reed in the episode "The Abduction", as Collins in the episode "Found Child", as Cato Troxell in the episode "A Girl Named George"), The Rifleman, Wanted: Dead or Alive (episode "Till Death do us Part"), Death Valley Days (as Andrés Pico in "The Firebrand"), The Texan (in the 1959 episode “The Duchess of Denver”) and Rawhide.

In 1949, he was co-announcer, along with Fred Foy, and narrator of 16 of the shows of the first season of The Lone Ranger, speaking the well-known introduction as well as story details. The narration was dropped after sixteen episodes.

Mohr guest-starred seven times in the 1957–62 television series Maverick, twice playing Western gambler Doc Holliday in "The Quick and the Dead" and briefly at the conclusion of "Seed of Deception", a role he reprised again in "Doc Holliday in Durango", a 30-minute 1958 episode of Tombstone Territory. In another Maverick episode, he portrayed Steve Corbett, a character based on that played by Humphrey Bogart in Casablanca. That episode, "Escape to Tampico", used parts of the set from the original film, this time as a Mexican saloon. He also appeared in the Maverick episodes "You Can't Beat the Percentage", "The Burning Sky", "Mano Nera" and "The Deadly Image".

Mohr guest-starred on Crossroads, The DuPont Show with June Allyson, Harrigan and Son, The Barbara Stanwyck Show, It's Always Jan, Perry Mason, 77 Sunset Strip, Hawaiian Eye, Lost in Space, Ripcord, and many other television series of the era, especially those being produced by Warner Bros. Studios and Dick Powell's Four Star Productions.

He sang in the 1956 Cheyenne episode "Rendezvous at Red Rock". He also essayed Captain Vadim, an Iron Curtain submarine commander, in the Voyage to the Bottom of the Sea episode "The Lost Bomb". In the series' fourth and final season (1968-69), Mohr guest-starred in the episode "Flight From San Miguel" on The Big Valley with Barbara Stanwyck. This episode was broadcast posthumously in April 1969.

Mohr made guest appearances on such network television comedy shows as The George Burns and Gracie Allen Show (1951), How to Marry a Millionaire (1958), The Jack Benny Program (1961 & 1962), The Smothers Brothers Show (1965), and The Lucy Show (1968). He had the recurring role of newsman Brad Jackson in My Friend Irma (1952). He played "Ricky's friend", psychiatrist "Dr. Henry Molin" (real life name of the assistant film editor on the show), in the February 2, 1953 episode of I Love Lucy, "The Inferiority Complex". His repeated line was, "Treatment, Ricky. Treatment".

In 1954–55, he starred as Christopher Storm in 41 episodes of the third season of Foreign Intrigue, produced in Stockholm for American distribution. During several episodes of Foreign Intrigue, but most noticeably in "The Confidence Game" and "The Playful Prince", he can be heard playing on the piano his own musical composition, "The Frontier Theme", so called because Christopher Storm was the owner of the Hotel Frontier in Vienna. Foreign Intrigue was nominated for an Emmy Award in 1954 under the category "Best Mystery, Action or Adventure Program" and again in 1955 under the category "Best Mystery or Intrigue Series".

Mohr made four guest appearances on Perry Mason (1961–66). In his first appearance, he played Joe Medici in "The Case of the Unwelcome Bride". In 1963, he played murder victim Austin Lloyd in "The Case of the Elusive Element". In 1964, he played Alan Durfee, in "The Case of a Place Called Midnight". In 1966, he played agent Andy Rubin in the series' final episode, "The Case of the Final Fadeout". Also in 1966, Mohr played a seemingly diabolical character named Morbus in the Lost in Space episode "A Visit to Hades".

He continued to market his powerful voice, playing Reed Richards (Mister Fantastic) in the Fantastic Four cartoon series during 1967 and Green Lantern in the 1968 animated series Aquaman.

== Death ==
Mohr flew to Stockholm in September 1968, to star in the pilot of a proposed television series, Private Entrance, featuring Swedish actress Christina Schollin.

Shortly after the completion of filming, Mohr died of a heart attack in the evening of November 9, 1968, in Södermalm, Stockholm, aged 54. Mohr is interred in the columbarium of Lidingö Cemetery on the island of Lidingö, Sweden.

== Family ==
Mohr's son, Anthony Jeffrey Mohr, was born in 1947 and later became a Los Angeles Superior Court judge.

== Select filmography ==
- Society Smugglers (1939) as Footman (uncredited)
- Love Affair (1939) as Man (uncredited)
- Panama Patrol (1939) as Pilot
- Charlie Chan at Treasure Island (1939) as Dr. Zodiac (uncredited)
- The Housekeeper's Daughter (1939) as Gangster (uncredited)
- The Sea Hawk (1940) as Spanish Messenger (uncredited)
- The Reluctant Dragon (1941) as Studio Guard / Narrator (segment "Baby Weems") (voice, uncredited)
- The Monster and the Girl (1941) as Munn
- Jungle Girl (1941, Serial) as Slick Latimer
- We Go Fast (1941) as Nabob of Borria
- The Lady Has Plans (1942) as Joe Scalsi
- Woman of the Year (1942) as Radio Emcee (voice, uncredited)
- Dr. Broadway (1942) as Red
- One Dangerous Night (1943) as Harry Cooper
- Murder in Times Square (1943) as O'Dell Gissing
- King of the Cowboys (1943) as Maurice – the Mental Marvel
- Lady of Burlesque (1943) as Louie Grindero
- Redhead from Manhattan (1943) as Chick Andrews
- The Desert Song (1943) as Hassan (uncredited)
- A Guy Could Change (1946) as Eddy Raymond
- The Notorious Lone Wolf (1946) as Michael Lanyard / The Lone Wolf
- Young Widow (1946) as Walter, the Wolf (uncredited)
- Gilda (1946) as Capt. Delgado
- The Truth About Murder (1946) as Johnny Lacka
- Passkey to Danger (1946) as Malcolm Tauber
- Dangerous Business (1946) as Duke
- The Invisible Informer (1946) as Eric Baylor
- The Magnificent Rogue (1946) as Mark Townley
- The Lone Wolf in Mexico (1947) as Michael Lanyard
- Heaven Only Knows (1947) as Treason
- The Lone Wolf in London (1947) as Michael Lanyard
- Two Guys from Texas (1948) as Link Jessup
- Bad Men of Tombstone (1949) as Narrator (uncredited)
- Slightly French (1949) as J. B. (voice, uncredited)
- The Blonde Bandit (1950) as Joe Sapelli
- Wyoming Mail (1950) as Opening Narrator (voice, uncredited)
- Undercover Girl (1950) as Reed Menig
- Southside 1-1000 (1950) as Narrator (voice, uncredited)
- Hunt the Man Down (1950) as Walter Long
- Bullfighter and the Lady (1951) as Trailer Narrator (voice, uncredited)
- Sirocco (1951) as Major Jean Leon
- Detective Story (1951) as Tami Giacoppetti
- Ten Tall Men (1951) as Kayeed Hussein
- Smoky Canyon (1952) as Narrator (voice, uncredited)
- The Sniper (1952) as Police Sgt. Joe Ferris
- Montana Territory (1952) as Mid-Film Narrator (voice, uncredited)
- The Duel at Silver Creek (1952) as Rod Lacy
- Son of Ali Baba (1952) as Capt. Youssef
- It Grows on Trees (1952) as Character in TV Western (voice, uncredited)
- The Ring (1952) as Pete Ganusa
- Invasion USA (1952) as Vince Potter
- The Legend of the Lone Ranger (1952) as Narrator (voice, uncredited)
- The 49th Man (1953) as Narrator (voice, uncredited)
- Raiders of the Seven Seas (1953) as Captain Jose Salcedo
- The Eddie Cantor Story (1953) as Rocky Kramer
- Money from Home (1953) as Marshall Preston
- Dragonfly Squadron (1954) as Capt. MacIntyre

•Dick Powell's Zane Grey Theatre, S1.E8 ∙ A Quiet Sunday in San Ardo (1956)

- The Night the World Exploded (1957) as Narrator (uncredited)
- The Buckskin Lady (1957) as Slinger
- Raiders of Old California (1957) as Narrator (uncredited)
- Terror in the Haunted House (1958, aka My World Dies Screaming) as Philip Tierney
- Guns, Girls, and Gangsters (1958) as Charles (Chuck) Wheeler
- A Date with Death (1959) as Mike Mason / Louis Deverman
- The Angry Red Planet (1959) as Col. Thomas O'Bannion
- This Rebel Breed (1960) as Lt. Robert Brooks
- Bat Masterson (1961) as villain Crimp Ward
- Wild West Story (1964) as Enrico Gonzales
- Fantastic Four (1967–68) as Mister Fantastic/Reed Richards (voice)
- Funny Girl (1968) as Branca
