= Rosamond Marshall =

American novelist

- Born: Rosamond Van Der Zee Botsford; October 17, 1893
- Died: November 13, 1957 (aged 64)
- Occupation: Novelist
- Spouse: Albert Earl Marshall
- Writing career
- Notable works: Kitty (1943), The Bixby Girls (1957)

Rosamond Marshall (born Rosamond van der Zee Botsford, October 17, 1893 – November 13, 1957) was an American novelist. She wrote chiefly historical romances for adult and youth readers during the 1940s and 1950s. Two of her novels, Kitty (1943) and The Bixby Girls (1957), were adapted as motion pictures.

== Early life ==
Marshall was born Rosamond van der Zee Botsford on October 17, 1893, New York City, New York. She was the daughter of Charles and Florence (née Topping) Botsford. She attended local schools.

As a young woman, she traveled and studied in Europe, including Italy. She married an Italian man but they divorced.

She had returned to the US by the 1930s, and met and married Albert Earl Marshall in New York City. She later published books under her married name as Rosamond Marshall.

== Career ==
She began writing and published her first seven books in French, for young readers.

Her first novel published in English, None But the Brave, A Story of Holland (1942), a work for young people, won the New York Herald Tribune Spring Book Award.

But Rosamond Marshall's novels for young people were overshadowed by the success of her historical romance novels for adults. The first of these, Kitty (1943), set the pattern for high sales. It was set in England in the late 18th century, and seemed to borrow from George Bernard Shaw's play Pygmalion (1913).

A number of her historical romances were translated into European languages, including Danish, French, Italian, and German.

Two of Marshall's novels were made into motion pictures. The film, Kitty (1945), starred Ray Milland and Paulette Goddard in an 18th-century English setting..

All the Fine Young Cannibals (1960) was based on her book The Bixby Girls (1957). The book explores the lives of two sisters in the World War I era, and also takes in their brother, a musician whose character seems loosely inspired by the life of Chet Baker. This book was set in the 20th century, rather than the more distant past. The film starred Robert Wagner, Natalie Wood, and George Hamilton.

== Personal life ==
While in Turin, Italy she had met and married an Italian man, Pierro Antonio Gariazzo, on December 26, 1914. They lived for a time in Rome. After divorcing Gariazzo, she married Albert Earl Marshall of New York City, on August 10, 1936.

They later lived in California and also had a farm on Vancouver Island, British Columbia, Canada.

== Death ==
In later life, Marshall divided her time between Southern California and her farm on Vancouver Island, Canada. She died on November 13, 1957.

== Bibliography ==
Published works by Rosamond Marshall:

- Marshall, Rosamond (1942). None But the Brave, A Story of Holland. Boston, Houghton Mifflin.
- Marshall, Rosamond (1943). Kitty. New York, Duell, Sloan & Pearce. ISBN 0-87529-516-9.
- Marshall, Rosamond (1946). The Treasure of Shafto. New York, J. Messner, Inc.
- Marshall, Rosamond (1946). Kitty. Cleveland : World Publishing Co. ISBN 0-87529-516-9.
- Marshall, Rosamond (1946). Duchess Hotspur (La duchesse de feu). New York, Prentice-Hall.
- Marshall, Rosamond (1947). Duchess Hotspur (La duchesse de feu). Paris, P. Dupont.
- Marshall, Rosamond (1947). Hertuginden. København, Jespersen og Pio.
- Marshall, Rosamond (1948). Kitty, Romanzo. [Traduzione di Ada Valori Piperno. Milano, J. Sapi.
- Marshall, Rosamond (1949). Celeste. New York, Prentice-Hall.
- Marshall, Rosamond (1951). Laird's Choice, A Novel. New York, Prentice-Hall.
- Marshall, Rosamond (1951). Celeste: Roman. Berlin-Schöneberg, Delta-Verlag.
- Marshall, Rosamond (1952). Bond of the Flesh, A Novel. Garden City, N.Y., Doubleday.
- Marshall, Rosamond (1952). Jane Hadden. New York, Prentice-Hall.
- Marshall, Rosamond (1953). The General's Wench. New York, Prentice-Hall.
- Marshall, Rosamond (1954). The Dollmaster. New York, Prentice-Hall. ISBN 0-450-00295-0. (NB this has also been referred to as The Doll Master)
- Marshall, Rosamond (1954). The Loving Meddler. Garden City, N.Y., Doubleday.
- Marshall, Rosamond (1955). Rogue Cavalier. Garden City, N.Y., Doubleday.
- Marshall, Rosamond (1956). The Rib of the Hawk. New York, Appleton-Century-Crofts.
- Marshall, Rosamond (1957). Captain Ironhand. New York, Appleton-Century-Crofts. ISBN 0-553-11724-6.
- Marshall, Rosamond (1957). The Bixby Girls. Garden City, N.Y., Doubleday.

== Sources ==
- The New York Times p30 N 26’57 (Obituary)
- Current Biography, 1942, page 575: It lists the following (New York Herald Tribune Books, p8 My 10'42 pors Pub W 141:1768-9 My 9 '42 por)
- Current Biography, 1957, page 273
- Twentieth Century Authors, First supplement, Edited by Stanley J. Kunitz, Assistant editor Vineta Colby, 1955, pages 645-646
